= Bunker Hill Gazette-News =

- Type: Weekly newspaper
- Format: Broadsheet
- Owner(s): Bunker Hill Publications
- Founded: 1866
- Headquarters: Hillsboro, Illinois
- Circulation: 1650
- OCLC number: 23283890

The Bunker Hill Gazette-News is a weekly newspaper that is part of the Bunker Hill Publications group. John Galer is the publisher and Courtney Wood the editor. The Gazette has served the Bunker Hill community since 1866.

The Gazette has a circulation of 1650, covering the communities of Bunker Hill, Shipman, Dorsey, Prairietown, Moro, Dorchester, Woodburn, and Royal Lakes. The paper is published every Thursday with a deadline of Monday by 5:00 pm CST.

Bunker Hill Publications, headquartered in Hillsboro, Illinois, publishes four weekly subscription papers and a free circulation paper. The subscription papers are the Bunker Hill Gazette-News, The Southwestern Journal, the Madison County Chronicle, and the Mount Olive Herald. The free circulation paper is the Southwestern Advertiser with a circulation of 8600. Bunker Hill Publications offices are located in Bunker Hill, Brighton, and Worden. It has a circulation of 1,650.

== Sources ==
- Illinois Press Association, Illinois Newspaper Directory
