= Saint Jacob =

Saint Jacob, St. Jacob, St. Jacobs or St. Jakob may refer to:

== People ==
- Saint Jacob the Apostle, son of Zebedee, or Saint James the Great. James is used as a translation of the Hebrew name Jacob (Ya'akov).
- Saint James (disambiguation)
- Saint Jacob of Alaska, missionary of the Orthodox Church
- Saint Jacob of Nisibis (died c. 338 or 350), also known as Saint James of Nisibis, or Saint Jacob of Mygdonia

== Places ==
- St. Jacob, Illinois, U.S.
- St. Jacob Township, Madison County, Illinois, U.S.
- St. Jacobs, Ontario, Canada
- Sankt Jakob in Haus, Austria
- Sankt Jakob im Rosental, Austria
- Sankt Jakob im Walde, Austria
- St. Jakob Arena in Basel, Switzerland, noted for ice hockey
- St. Jakob Stadium in Basel (1954–1998)
- St. Jakob-Park in Basel, Switzerland

== Churches ==
- Šibenik Cathedral, Croatia, often known as St. Jacob's
- St. James's Cathedral, Riga, Latvia, often known as St. Jacob's
- St. James's Parish Church (Ljubljana), Slovenia, often known as St. Jacob's

== Ships ==
- ST Jacobs, an Indonesian steam tug in service 1949–59

== See also ==
- Jacob (disambiguation)
- Jakob (disambiguation)
- Saint Jakov
