= Holiday Shores, Illinois =

- Census-designated place
- Location within Illinois Location within the United States
- Coordinates: 38°55′19″N 89°56′26″W
- Country: United States
- State: Illinois
- County: Madison
- Townships: Fort Russell, Moro, Omphghent

Area
  - Total: 2.05 sq mi (5.30 km^{2})
  - Land: 1.58 sq mi (4.10 km^{2})
  - Water: 0.46 sq mi (1.20 km^{2})
- Elevation: 518 ft (158 m)

Population (2020)
  - Total: 2,840
  - Density: 1,794.8/sq mi (692.99/km^{2})
- Time zone: UTC-6 (Central (CST))
  - Summer (DST): UTC-5 (CDT)
- ZIP Codes: 62025 (Edwardsville); 62097 (Worden)
- Area code: 618
- GNIS feature ID: 410387
- FIPS code: 17-35541

Holiday Shores is an unincorporated community and census-designated place (CDP) in Madison County, Illinois, United States. Its population was 2,840 as of the 2020 census.

== History ==
Development of Holiday Shores began in 1965 around the man-made Holiday Lake, which covers approximately 430 acres. Madison County's growth-management plan describes the unincorporated community as established in 1967.

The county plan identifies Holishor Association as the community's private membership association. In 2016, the association's membership voted to explore incorporating Holiday Shores as a municipality.

== Geography ==
Holiday Shores is in northern Madison County and consists of housing surrounding Holiday Lake, a reservoir on Joulters Creek. The lake outlet is a quarter mile north of Paddock Creek, a south-flowing tributary of Cahokia Creek, which continues southwest to the Mississippi River near Hartford.

The community is 15 miles (24 km) east of Alton, 10 miles (16 km) north of Edwardsville, the Madison county seat, and 30 miles (48 km) northeast of St. Louis.

== Demographics ==
Historical population
Census	Pop.	Note	%±
2010	2,882		—
2020	2,840		−1.5%
U.S. Decennial Census

=== 2020 census ===
As of the 2020 census, Holiday Shores had a population of 2,840. The median age was 46.4 years. 21.1% of residents were under the age of 18 and 20.9% of residents were 65 years of age or older. For every 100 females there were 96.8 males, and for every 100 females age 18 and over there were 95.1 males age 18 and over.

0.0% of residents lived in urban areas, while 100.0% lived in rural areas.

There were 1,110 households in Holiday Shores, of which 27.0% had children under the age of 18 living in them. Of all households, 63.6% were married-couple households, 14.1% were households with a male householder and no spouse or partner present, and 16.0% were households with a female householder and no spouse or partner present. About 19.3% of all households were made up of individuals and 10.4% had someone living alone who was 65 years of age or older.

There were 1,167 housing units, of which 4.9% were vacant. The homeowner vacancy rate was 0.5% and the rental vacancy rate was 5.2%.

Racial composition as of the 2020 census
Race	Number	Percent
White	2,601	91.6%
Black or African American	27	1.0%
American Indian and Alaska Native	1	0.0%
Asian	8	0.3%
Native Hawaiian and Other Pacific Islander	0	0.0%
Some other race	11	0.4%
Two or more races	192	6.8%
Hispanic or Latino (of any race)	81	2.9%

== Education ==
The community is in the Edwardsville Community Unit School District 7.
