= Midway, Madison County, Illinois =

Midway, Illinois
- Unincorporated community
- Location within Illinois Location within the United States
- Coordinates: 38°55′43″N 89°58′19″W
- Country: United States
- State: Illinois
- County: Madison
- Township: Moro
- Elevation: 551 ft (168 m)
- Time zone: UTC-6 (Central (CST))
  - Summer (DST): UTC-5 (CDT)
- Area code: 618
- GNIS feature ID: 422979

Midway is an unincorporated community in Moro Township, Madison County, Illinois, United States. Midway is located on Illinois Route 159, 3.9 miles (6.3 km) east-northeast of Bethalto.
