= Herrin =

Herrin may refer to:

- Herrin (surname)
- Herrin, Illinois, a city in the United States
- Herrin, Nord, a commune of the département of Nord, France
- Herrin massacre, a mining labor dispute in Herrin, Illinois
