= Prairietown, Illinois =

- Census-designated place
- Location within Illinois Location within the United States
- Coordinates: 38°57′59″N 89°55′24″W
- Country: United States
- State: Illinois
- County: Madison
- Township: Omphghent

Area
  - Total: 0.19 sq mi (0.49 km^{2})
  - Land: 0.19 sq mi (0.49 km^{2})
  - Water: 0 sq mi (0.00 km^{2})
- Elevation: 581 ft (177 m)

Population (2020)
  - Total: 153
  - Density: 814.5/sq mi (314.48/km^{2})
- Time zone: UTC-6 (Central (CST))
  - Summer (DST): UTC-5 (CDT)
- ZIP Codes: 62097 (Worden); 62021 (Dorsey)
- Area code: 618
- GNIS feature ID: 2804654

Prairietown is an unincorporated community and census-designated place (CDP) in Madison County, Illinois, United States. As of the 2020 census, it had a population of 153. It is part of the Metro East region of Greater St. Louis.

== Geography ==
Prairietown is in northern Madison County, 8 miles (13 km) southwest of Staunton, 17 miles (27 km) east-northeast of Alton, and 33 miles (53 km) northeast of St. Louis.

According to the U.S. Census Bureau, Prairietown has an area of 0.19 square miles (0.49 km^{2}), all land. It drains to the west toward Joulters Creek and to the east toward Sherry Creek, both south-flowing tributaries of Cahokia Creek, which runs southwest to the Mississippi River.

== Demographics ==
Historical population
Census	Pop.	Note	%±
2020	153		—
U.S. Decennial Census

Prairietown first appeared as a census designated place in the 2020 U.S. census.

== Education ==
It is in the Edwardsville Community Unit School District 7.
