= Edwardsville, Illinois =

- City
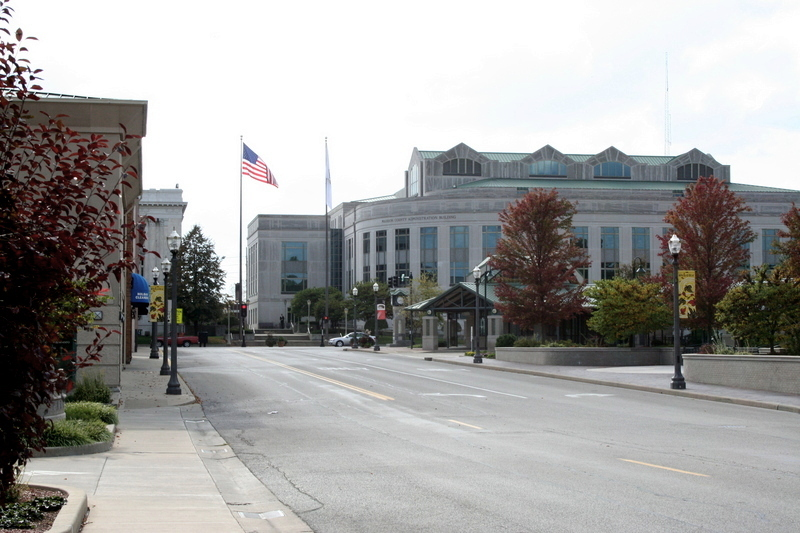
- Downtown Edwardsville with the Madison County Administration Building in the background
- Interactive map of Edwardsville, Illinois
- Location within Illinois Location within the United States
- Coordinates: 38°47′16″N 90°01′16″W
- Country: United States
- State: Illinois
- County: Madison

Area
  - Total: 20.50 sq mi (53.10 km^{2})
  - Land: 19.90 sq mi (51.53 km^{2})
  - Water: 0.61 sq mi (1.58 km^{2})
- Elevation: 568 ft (173 m)

Population (2020)
  - Total: 26,808
  - Density: 1,347.5/sq mi (520.28/km^{2})
- Time zone: UTC−6 (CST)
  - Summer (DST): UTC−5 (CDT)
- ZIP Codes: 62025, 62026
- Area code: 618
- FIPS code: 17-22697
- GNIS feature ID: 2394626
- Website: cityofedwardsville.com

Edwardsville is a city in Madison County, Illinois, United States, and its county seat. The population was 26,808 as of the 2020 census. The city was named in honor of Ninian Edwards, former governor of the Illinois Territory. Edwardsville is a part of Southern Illinois and the Metro East region within Greater St. Louis, located 18 miles (29 km) northeast of downtown St. Louis.

Southern Illinois University Edwardsville, the Edwardsville Arts Center, the Edwardsville Journal, the Madison County Record, and the Edwardsville Intelligencer are based in Edwardsville. Edwardsville High School and Metro-East Lutheran High School serve students in the area. Edwardsville also serves as the headquarters for Prairie Farms Dairy, one of the largest dairy cooperatives in the United States and ranked in the top 10 of the largest privately held companies in the St. Louis region. The city is part of the Edwardsville School District, which also includes the villages of Glen Carbon, Hamel and Moro, as well as the township areas around them.

== History ==
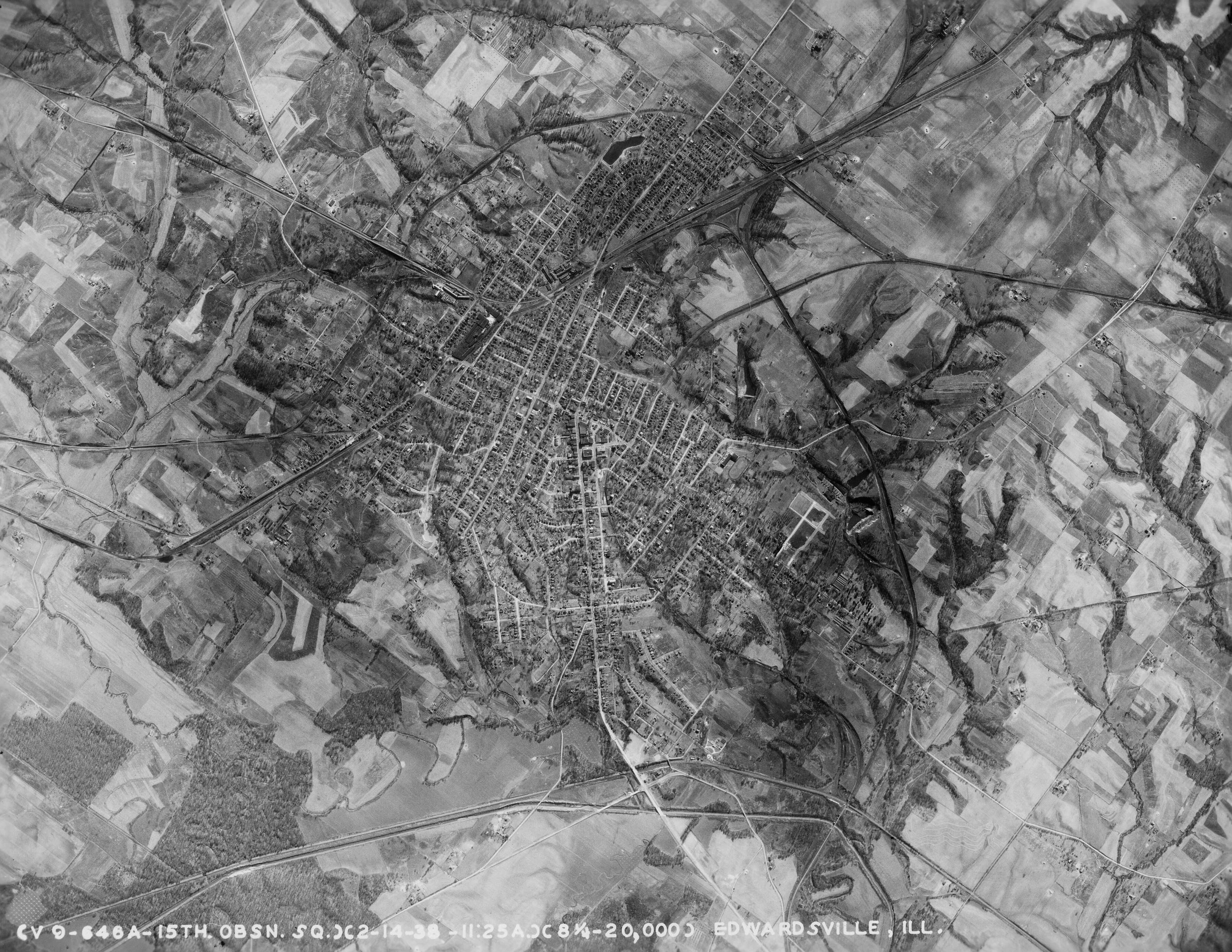
View of Edwardsville, 1938

Edwardsville was incorporated in 1818. The first European-American settler was Thomas Kirkpatrick, who came in 1805, laid out a community, and served as the Justice of the Peace. He named the community after his friend Ninian Edwards, then territorial governor of Illinois. (Illinois did not become a state until 1818.) The Edwards Trace, a key trail in the settlement of Central Illinois, used Edwardsville as a northward launching point.

In 1868 The Bank of Edwardsville was founded. It was purchased by Champaign, Illinois-based Busey Bank in 2019.

In 1890, St. Louis industrialist N. O. Nelson chose a tract of land just south of Edwardsville to build plumbing factories. He also built a model workers' cooperative village called Leclaire. He offered workers fair wages with reasonable working hours and a share of the profits. He named the village in honor of the French economist Edme-Jean Leclaire. The village also provided educational and recreational opportunities and made it financially possible for anyone to own a home. Unlike company towns such as Pullman near Chicago, the welfare and quality of life for the workers and their families was a major concern.

In 1934, the Village of Leclaire was incorporated into the City of Edwardsville. The area has a lake and park, baseball field, and the Edwardsville Children's Museum in the former N. O. Nelson memorial Leclaire schoolhouse. Several Nelson factory buildings were renovated and adapted for use as the historic N. O. Nelson Campus of Lewis and Clark Community College. The recognized Historic District has been listed on the National Register of Historic Places.

Each year on the third Sunday in October, the Friends of Leclaire host the annual Leclaire Parkfest with food, live heritage music, historic displays & tours, artisans, children's activities, a book sale, and more.

In 1983, Edwardsville's historic Saint Louis Street was also listed on the National Register of Historic Places. Dating back to 1809, this Historic District has a mile-long visual landscape. More than 50 historic homes date from the middle 19th century to early 20th century. The protection and preservation of Saint Louis Street is overseen by the Historic Saint Louis Street Association.

Five Illinois governors came from Edwardsville: namesake Ninian Edwards, who became a territorial governor in 1809 and later served as governor from 1826 to 1830; Edward Coles, elected in 1822 and a strong opponent of slavery; John Reynolds, governor from 1830 to 1834; Thomas Ford, governor from 1842 to 1846; and Charles Deneen, governor from 1909 to 1913.

Former president Abraham Lincoln was in Edwardsville twice, as an attorney in the 1814 courthouse and a speaker outside the 1857 courthouse on September 11, 1858. The present county courthouse, a square, four-story neoclassical structure of white marble that rises to six stories at the back section, was constructed from 1913 to 1915.

A 2010 issue of Family Circle magazine named Edwardsville third of their "Top 10 Best Towns for Families".

Edwardsville was heavily affected by the tornado outbreak of December 10–11, 2021. An Amazon warehouse collapsed after being hit by an EF3 tornado and six workers were killed and many others injured.

== Geography ==
Edwardsville, Illinois

Climate chart (precipitation, max. and min. temperature)
| J | F | M | A | M | J | J | A | S | O | N | D |
| 2 36 19 | 2.3 42 24 | 3.5 52 34 | 4.2 64 45 | 4.2 75 55 | 3.2 84 64 | 3.5 90 70 | 3.2 86 66 | 3.1 79 58 | 2.7 68 46 | 3.8 53 35 | 2.9 41 25 |
- █ Average max. and min. temperatures in °F
- █ Precipitation totals in inches
- Source: The Weather Channel
Metric conversion
| J | F | M | A | M | J | J | A | S | O | N | D |
| 51 2 −7 | 58 6 −4 | 88 11 1 | 106 18 7 | 108 24 13 | 82 29 18 | 89 32 21 | 81 30 19 | 80 26 14 | 69 20 8 | 95 12 2 | 74 5 −4 |
- █ Average max. and min. temperatures in °C
- █ Precipitation totals in mm

According to the 2021 census gazetteer files, Edwardsville has a total area of 20.42 square miles (52.89 km^{2}), of which 19.81 square miles (51.31 km^{2}) (or 97.02%) is land and 0.61 square miles (1.58 km^{2}) (or 2.98%) is water.

=== Climate ===
In recent years, average temperatures in the county seat of Edwardsville have ranged from a low of 19 °F (−7 °C) in January to a high of 90 °F (32 °C) in July, although a record low of −27 °F (−33 °C) was recorded in January 1977 and a record high of 114 °F (46 °C) was recorded in July 2012. Average monthly precipitation ranged from 1.99 inches (51 mm) in January to 4.24 inches (108 mm) in May. Climate Zone 4A per the International Energy Conservation Code.

== Demographics ==
Historical population
| Census | Pop. | Note | %± |
|---|---|---|---|
| 1850 | 677 | | — |
| 1870 | 2,193 | | — |
| 1880 | 2,887 | | 31.6% |
| 1890 | 3,561 | | 23.3% |
| 1900 | 4,157 | | 16.7% |
| 1910 | 5,014 | | 20.6% |
| 1920 | 5,336 | | 6.4% |
| 1930 | 6,235 | | 16.8% |
| 1940 | 8,008 | | 28.4% |
| 1950 | 8,776 | | 9.6% |
| 1960 | 9,996 | | 13.9% |
| 1970 | 11,070 | | 10.7% |
| 1980 | 12,480 | | 12.7% |
| 1990 | 14,579 | | 16.8% |
| 2000 | 21,491 | | 47.4% |
| 2010 | 24,293 | | 13.0% |
| 2020 | 26,808 | | 10.4% |
U.S. Decennial Census

As of the 2020 census, Edwardsville had a population of 26,808. The median age was 30.1 years. 18.4% of residents were under the age of 18 and 13.3% of residents were 65 years of age or older. For every 100 females there were 93.9 males, and for every 100 females age 18 and over there were 92.6 males age 18 and over.

99.4% of residents lived in urban areas, while 0.6% lived in rural areas.

There were 9,478 households in Edwardsville, of which 28.6% had children under the age of 18 living in them. Of all households, 47.0% were married-couple households, 19.0% were households with a male householder and no spouse or partner present, and 27.9% were households with a female householder and no spouse or partner present. About 28.5% of all households were made up of individuals and 10.7% had someone living alone who was 65 years of age or older.

There were 10,456 housing units, of which 9.4% were vacant. The homeowner vacancy rate was 1.8% and the rental vacancy rate was 14.2%.

Racial composition as of the 2020 census
| Race | Number | Percent |
|---|---|---|
| White | 21,295 | 79.4% |
| Black or African American | 2,736 | 10.2% |
| American Indian and Alaska Native | 54 | 0.2% |
| Asian | 822 | 3.1% |
| Native Hawaiian and Other Pacific Islander | 28 | 0.1% |
| Some other race | 308 | 1.1% |
| Two or more races | 1,565 | 5.8% |
| Hispanic or Latino (of any race) | 982 | 3.7% |

== Media ==
=== Print ===
- Daily newspaper: The Edwardsville Intelligencer (daily and Saturday only)

=== Radio ===
- WSIE-FM 88.7, radio station of Southern Illinois University Edwardsville.
- WRYT-AM 1080, religious programming (Covenant Network—Roman Catholic).
- Edwardsville is also served by most St. Louis, Missouri, radio stations.

=== Television ===
- ECTV Channel 10, local channel available on Charter Cable in Glen Carbon and Edwardsville.

=== Pop culture ===
Scenes for the movie The Lucky Ones, starring Tim Robbins and Rachel McAdams, were filmed in downtown Edwardsville in June 2007. However, the scene filmed was set in Denver, Colorado, and banners were hung on Edwardsville's Main Street that read, "Welcome to Denver."

Singer-songwriter Jackson Browne recorded "Cocaine" and "Shaky Town" in Edwardsville's Holiday Inn Room 124 for his album Running on Empty. The Holiday Inn at 3080 S. Route 157 was torn down and rebuilt as a Comfort Suites.

A collection of poetry by Nigerian writer Kọ́lá Túbọ̀sún, Edwardsville by Heart (Wisdom's Bottom Press, November 2018), was based on the time the author spent in Edwardsville for three years as a Fulbright Scholar and student. The book was described by Howard Rambsy II of Southern Illinois University Edwardsville as "an artistic map disguised as a volume of poetry", and by Ainehi Edoro, writing in Brittle Paper, as "a magical meeting place of travelogue, memoir, and poetry."

An episode of the TV series House Hunters was filmed in Edwardsville and aired in January 2018. The episode featured a local couple, Zach and Hannah, who grew up and went to school in Edwardsville.

== Education ==
The vast majority of Edwardsville is in the Edwardsville Community Unit School District 7. Small pieces are in the Granite City Community Unit School District 9. Another small piece is in the Wood River-Hartford Elementary School District 15 and the East Alton-Wood River Community High School District 14.

== Notable people ==
- John Hicks Adams, gunslinger and Wild West lawman
- William H. Berry, Treasurer of Pennsylvania
- John Bischoff, Major League Baseball player
- Max L. Bowler, Illinois state representative
- Evelyn M. Bowles, Illinois state senator
- Jason Boyd, Major League Baseball pitcher
- Hedy Burress, actress
- Edward Coles, businessman and the second governor of Illinois
- Charles S. Deneen, US senator and the 23rd governor of Illinois
- Ninian Edwards, US senator and governor of Illinois
- A. J. Epenesa, Professional Football player for the NFL.
- Thomas Ford, Illinois Supreme Court judge and governor of Illinois
- Pamela L. Gay, astrophysicist
- Earl E. Herrin, Illinois state representative
- Jason Isringhausen, pitcher with five MLB teams; lived in Edwardsville
- Mannie Jackson, chairman and CEO of the Harlem Globetrotters
- Thomas Judy, Illinois legislator
- Gary W. Kronk, amateur astronomer and writer
- Charles E. Lippincott, California State Senator and Illinois Auditor
- Mark Little, outfielder with Major League Baseball teams
- Kate Martin, Guard WNBA, played basketball for Edwardsville High School
- José Martínez, first baseman/outfielder for the New York Mets
- Laurie Metcalf, actress (Jackie Harris on Roseanne)
- Joseph P. Newsham, lawyer and US congressman from Louisiana
- Billie Poole, jazz singer
- John Reynolds, US congressman, Illinois Supreme Court justice, and governor of Illinois
- AJ Schnack, director of Kurt Cobain: About a Son
- Jesse L. Simpson, Chief Justice of the Illinois Supreme Court
- James W. Stephenson, American militia officer and politician from the state of Illinois.
- Sam M. Vadalabene, Illinois state legislator
- Lee Wheat, pitcher for the Philadelphia Athletics and Kansas City Athletics
- Rudolph G. Wilson, first black school board member/president in the city's history

== See also ==
- Benjamin Stephenson House
- AE Harmon
