= Fort Russell =

Fort Russell may refer to:

- Fort Russell Township, Madison County, Illinois
- Fort D.A. Russell (Wyoming)
- Fort D. A. Russell (Texas)
