= Alhambra, Illinois =

- Village
- Interactive map of Alhambra, Illinois
- Coordinates: 38°53′16″N 89°44′10″W
- Country: United States
- State: Illinois
- County: Madison
- Township: Alhambra

Area
  - Total: 0.76 sq mi (1.98 km^{2})
  - Land: 0.76 sq mi (1.96 km^{2})
  - Water: 0.0077 sq mi (0.02 km^{2})
- Elevation: 558 ft (170 m)

Population (2020)
  - Total: 622
  - Density: 823.3/sq mi (317.86/km^{2})
- Time zone: UTC-6 (CST)
  - Summer (DST): UTC-5 (CDT)
- ZIP code: 62001
- Area code: 618
- FIPS code: 17-00737
- GNIS feature ID: 2397932
- Website: villageofalhambra.com

Alhambra is a village in Madison County, Illinois, United States. The population was 622 at the 2020 census.

Alhambra is part of the Metro-East region of the St. Louis, MO-IL Metropolitan Statistical Area.

== History ==
Alhambra was laid out in 1849. The name was inspired by Tales of the Alhambra by Washington Irving.

The first cooperative soybean processing unit in Illinois, the Alhambra Grain & Feed Co., was located in the village. It began full production on March 1, 1945.

== Geography ==
Alhambra is located in northeastern Madison County. Illinois Route 140 passes through the village as Main Street, leading west 6 miles (10 km) to Hamel and east 17 miles (27 km) to Greenville. St. Louis, Missouri, is 36 miles (58 km) to the southwest.

According to the 2021 census gazetteer files, Alhambra has a total area of 0.76 square miles (1.97 km^{2}), of which 0.76 square miles (1.97 km^{2}) (or 98.95%) is land and 0.01 square miles (0.03 km^{2}) (or 1.05%) is water. The village drains southwest to Silver Creek, a south-flowing tributary of the Kaskaskia River.

== Demographics ==
Historical population
Census	Pop.	Note	%±
1870	101		—
1880	168		66.3%
1900	368		—
1910	433		17.7%
1920	354		−18.2%
1930	355		0.3%
1940	375		5.6%
1950	476		26.9%
1960	537		12.8%
1970	594		10.6%
1980	643		8.2%
1990	709		10.3%
2000	630		−11.1%
2010	681		8.1%
2020	622		−8.7%
U.S. Decennial Census

As of the 2020 census there were 622 people, 284 households, and 155 families residing in the village. The population density was 814.14 inhabitants per square mile (314.34/km^{2}). There were 258 housing units at an average density of 337.70 per square mile (130.39/km^{2}). The racial makeup of the village was 88.59% White, 1.13% African American, 0.16% Native American, 0.00% Asian, 0.00% Pacific Islander, 0.16% from other races, and 9.97% from two or more races. Hispanic or Latino of any race were 8.68% of the population.

There were 284 households, out of which 37.0% had children under the age of 18 living with them, 40.85% were married couples living together, 10.56% had a female householder with no husband present, and 45.42% were non-families. 33.45% of all households were made up of individuals, and 13.73% had someone living alone who was 65 years of age or older. The average household size was 2.60 and the average family size was 2.02.

The village's age distribution consisted of 19.2% under the age of 18, 4.3% from 18 to 24, 26.4% from 25 to 44, 25.1% from 45 to 64, and 25.1% who were 65 years of age or older. The median age was 45.3 years. For every 100 females, there were 93.7 males. For every 100 females age 18 and over, there were 95.0 males.

The median income for a household in the village was $50,714, and the median income for a family was $80,972. Males had a median income of $51,875 versus $40,469 for females. The per capita income for the village was $25,055. About 3.9% of families and 7.3% of the population were below the poverty line, including 3.4% of those under age 18 and 0.0% of those age 65 or over.

== Education ==
Alhambra is served by Highland Community Unit School District 5, which operates Alhambra Primary School in the village.
