= Woodburn, Illinois =

- Unincorporated community
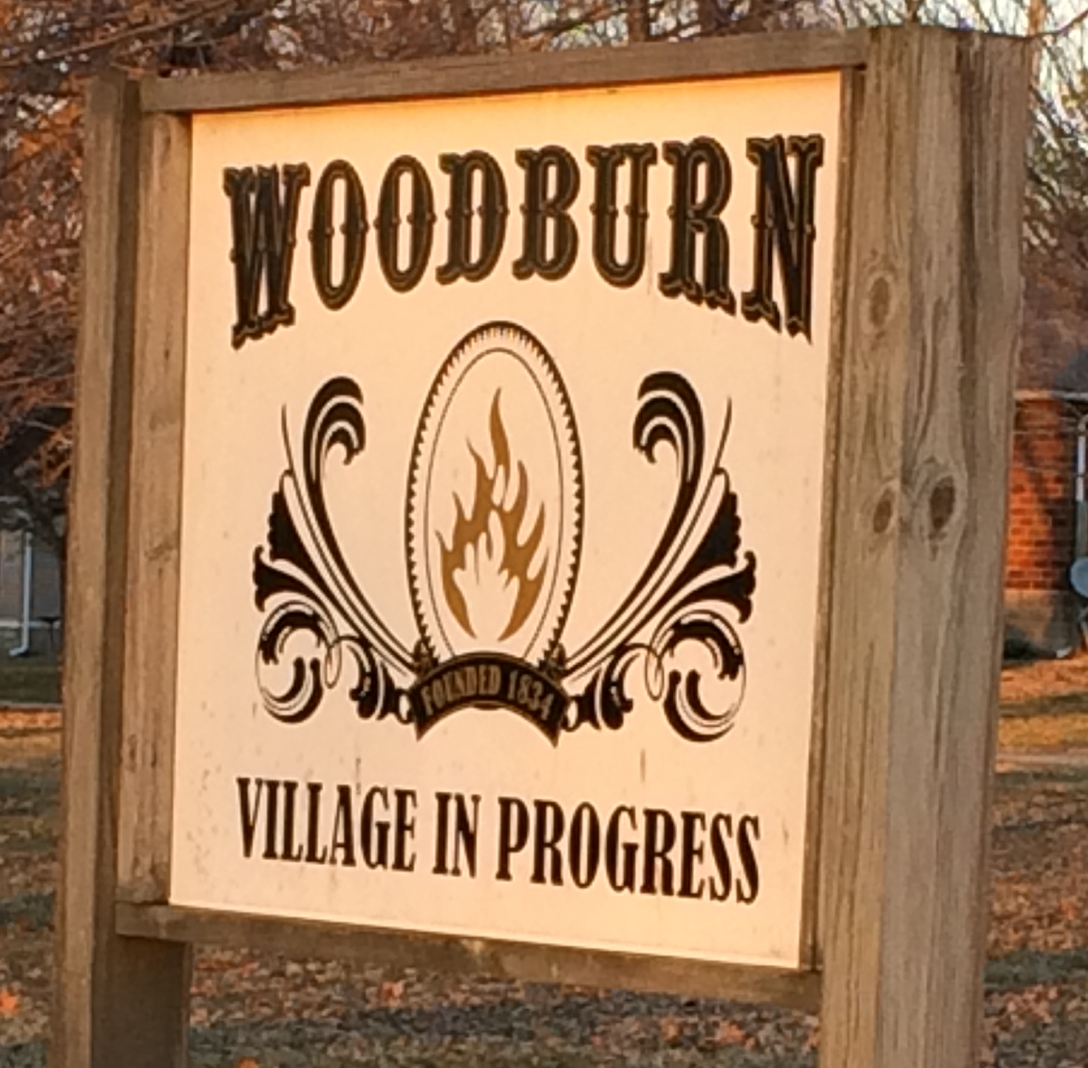
- Sign in the public square of Woodburn, Illinois.

- Location within Illinois Location within the United States
- Coordinates: 39°02′51″N 90°00′43″W
- Country: United States
- State: Illinois
- County: Macoupin
- Established: 1834
- Elevation: 640 ft (195 m)

Population (1911)
  - Total: 175
- Time zone: UTC-6 (Central (CST))
  - Summer (DST): UTC-5 (CDT)
- ZIP code: 62014
- Area code: 618
- GNIS feature ID: 421419

Woodburn is an unincorporated community in Bunker Hill Township, Macoupin County, Illinois, United States.

== Location ==
The village of Woodburn is situated at the crossroads of the Brighton-Bunker Hill Road and the old Alton-Springfield stagecoach road (currently known as Woodburn Road south of town and Shaw Road north of town).

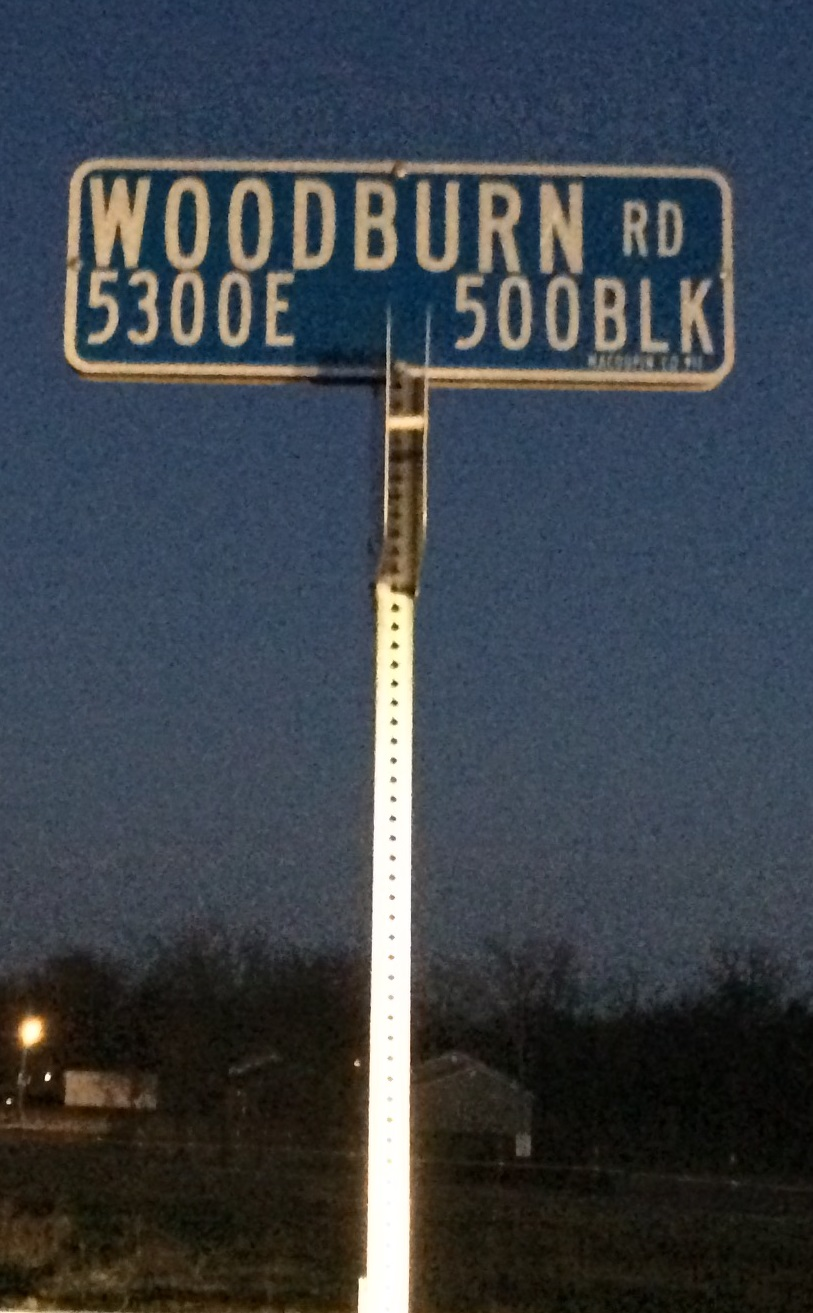

Surrounding communities include Bunker Hill 3.4 miles (5.5 km) east, Brighton 7 miles (11 km) west, Shipman 5.1 miles (8.2 km) northwest, Royal Lakes 5.3 miles (8.5 km) northeast, Fosterburg 6.8 miles (10.9 km) southwest, and Dorsey 6.9 miles (11.1 km) south.

== History ==
The village of Woodburn was one of the most important communities in the area during its first 50 years.

=== Origins ===
The last Indian encampment in the Woodburn area was abandoned in 1826. A few Native Americans were seen hunting as late as 1830, but European settlement and a bad snowstorm that killed many deer drove them west. One Indian trail ran from what is now Alton through the Woodburn area towards what is now Carlinville.

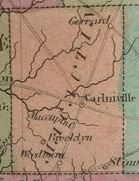
Pre-1837 Illinois county map showing Woodburn, but not its currently much larger neighbor, Bunker Hill

That trail led others to the area, including the Wood brothers from Kentucky. After the War of 1812, Illinois in general became known for its rich soil, and many families moved there. Around 1816 the Woods camped in the vicinity while looking for home sites. The name of the eventual town that would spring up in that area is said to have come from someone watching the Wood brothers' camp fire burning. They called the area "Wood Burn", which eventually was combined into one word.

In 1833, the survey of a state road from Alton to Springfield (passing through the Woodburn area along the old Indian trail) was completed.

It wasn't until 1834 that the town was formally laid out by Dr. B.F. Edwards. He originally planned just nine blocks, one of which was to be for a public park.

=== Growth ===
The first part of the town's history, as with any new community, was characterized by rapid growth. As the town grew more prominent, this growth resulted in the establishment of a number of new businesses, industries, schools, churches, and cemeteries.

==== Prominence ====
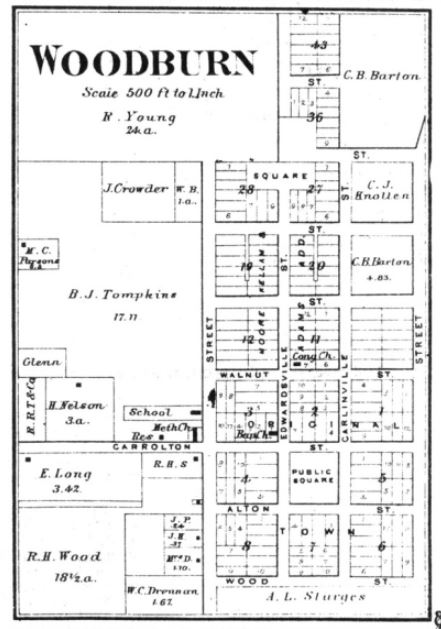
Woodburn street map from 1875 atlas of Macoupin County townships

Woodburn became the township "capital" (and would continue to be until at least 1876).

In 1836, several lots in town were used to create a town square in case Woodburn needed to serve not just as township capital, but perhaps as the county seat as well, which would require space for a courthouse. They didn't want the state to choose Bunker Hill or another smaller town in the vicinity just because there was no space in Woodburn. It never became the county seat, but the town did become an important stop along the stage route from Alton to Springfield where horse teams would be exchanged for fresh teams.

A post office was established at Woodburn in 1837. The name of the postmaster was Mr. Corey, and the mail was carried by George Gordon from Alton to Carlinville.

In 1839, the Whig political campaign celebrated Independence Day in Woodburn, and Abraham Lincoln was among the speakers.

==== Businesses ====
The first building was a store built by E.J. Miner in 1835. The first house was built that same year by Elijay Dodson. Others such as Daniel Luttrell, Enos Grandy, and James and R.R. Tompkins followed suit. Also that year, Dr. Edwards built a large inn for travelers.

Dr. Edwards and John Adams began and Mr. Mudge finished the first steam sawmill in the county in 1836. Later (sometime before 1840), Mr. Luttrell would build an animal-powered mill to grind corn, and it would be used by a large percentage of farmers in the area. Eventually (1841), T.J. VanDorn would buy the steam sawmill and convert it to a flour mill, setting Woodburn ahead of the rest of the county when it came to modern conveniences. The VanDorn mill burned in 1846, so in 1848 the Tompkins brothers built a mill, at first as a sawmill and a grist mill, but then later (1852) they converted it to a flour mill.

William West established the first "grocery" (what is currently known as a tavern or bar - a drinking establishment) in 1837. The town was known for its "stern virtues", however, and he was not successful at this business. (Eventually, those virtues must have relaxed because in 1850 there were three "groceries" in the town.) West, however, had better success with his brick kiln business started in that same year. Also, in that year, the first blacksmith shop was opened by the Perry brothers (though some claim that Alfred Davis was first).

Woodburn even had a tree nursery (established in 1845 by Jonathan Huggins). In fact, at some point in the past Woodburn boasted doctors, a dentist, blacksmiths, a painter, wagon makers, a carriage maker, carpenters, butchers, brickmakers and bricklayers.

==== Industries ====
Farming, then as now, was the majority industry in the Woodburn area. The Wood family figured in many of the local farms. In the early 1830s, James Wood, J.L. Wood, J.T. Wood, and Richard Wood settled in the area and set up farms. Another prominent local farmer who arrived in that same time period was Reverend Robert Blake.

Richard Welch owned several orchards and established a local apple drying business which employed several people, including men to operate the dryers and women to prepare the apples.

Castor beans were processed in Woodburn to make castor oil. This was the main lubricant until petroleum was discovered in 1854. Castor oil cost about two dollars a gallon, while petroleum cost only pennies for the same amount.

There were two coal mines in the Woodburn area around 1935. One, just north of the Bunker Hill Road near the current subdivision of Wood Hills, was owned by Angelo Mancini. Unfortunately, after working the mine for six to eight months water started flooding the mine. He bought a pump to remove the water, but it was stolen, and he subsequently closed up operations.

The Hausman Mine was south of town, just north of Tichenal Road (AKA "Coal Mine Road"). According to the mineral rights, the Hausmans, the operators of the mine, paid the land owners a half cent for every bushel of coal they mined. Workers were paid twelve dollars a week. This mine was more successful and was sold to an out-of-town interest only three years later.

==== Schools ====
The Baptist Church housed a school until a brick building could be built. That building was finished in 1846. This first school in town, however, was not large enough, so overflow students were taught in the Congregational church in 1850 and 1851. Then a two story brick school was finished. That building lasted until 1913. Children could attend even past eighth grade if they wanted. Courses such as botany, advanced math, and music (employing a teacher from Shurtleff College) were available for a fee.

The Benner family donated land on Huette Road near what is now the Country Bible Church for a school. It was named the Liberty School, but it seems everyone called it the Benner School in honor of the donors. In 1907, the school had 36 students, its library had 64 books, and the teacher was paid forty dollars a month.

==== Churches ====
The first church group in Woodburn was organized in 1835. This Baptist group didn't build a dedicated house of worship until 1843.

The first church building in town was the Congregational Church. While the group wasn't organized until 1838, they built their first house of worship in that same year. The first pastor was Rev. Robert Blake who was paid a salary of $150 per year. The church started with 40 members. From 1840 to 1842 it served both Woodburn and Bunker Hill (until a separate church was built in the latter community). A new brick church building on Walnut Street went up in 1854; it served until 1960.

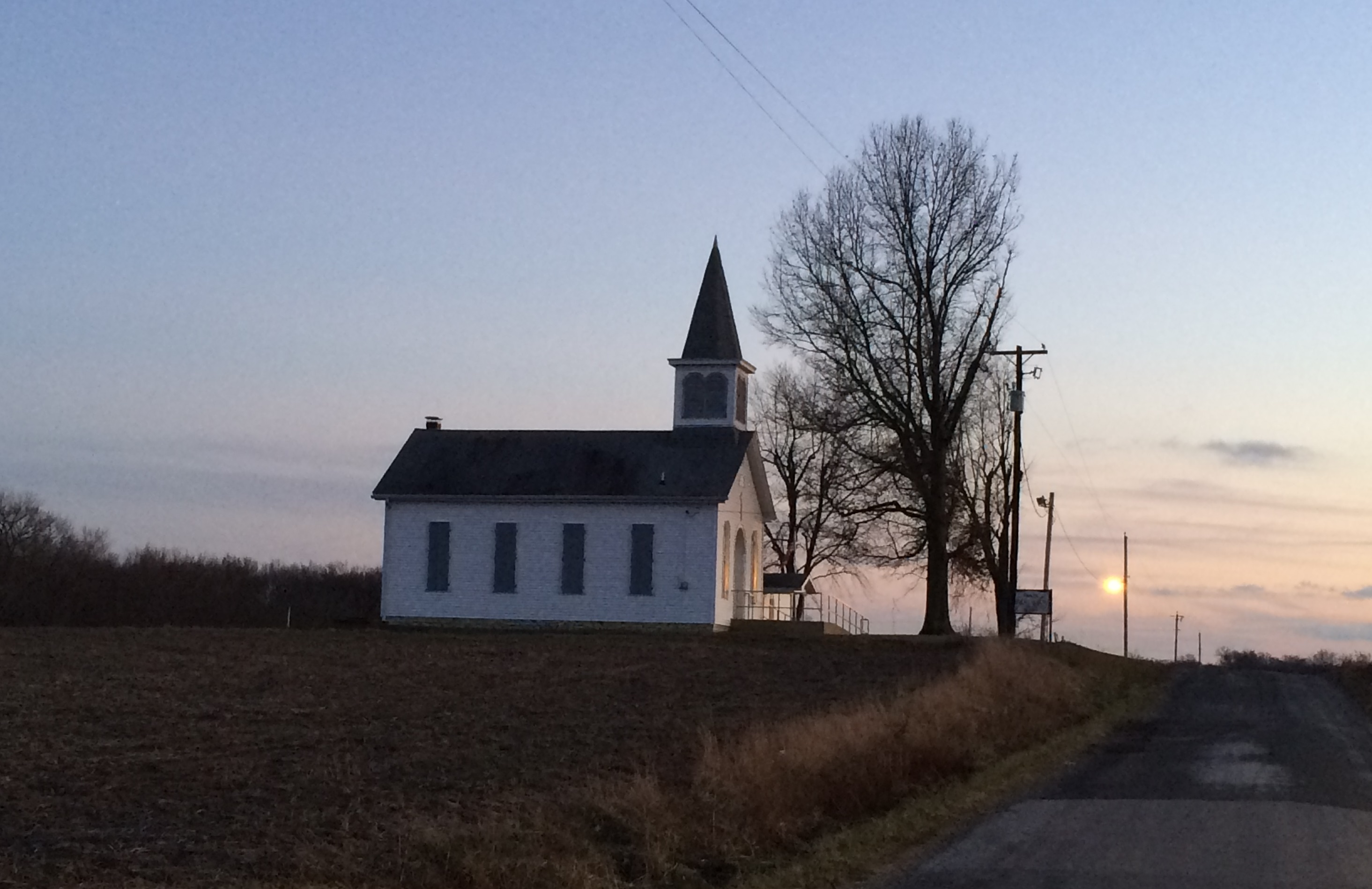
(former) Presbyterian Church

The Woodburn Presbyterian Church was organized in 1880, and their house of worship was built that same year. It came about because Fosterburg (where the next closest Presbyterian church was located) was too far to travel in a horse and buggy. The church building was constructed on land donated by the Benner family on Huette Road about 2 miles from town. It sits on a hill, and its bell tower can be seen for miles.

In addition to these churches, there were others that no longer exist. A Methodist church organized around 1838 built a house of worship in 1850 that included the first church bell in town. The Campbellites established a Christian church in 1858, but the members all moved away. The same building was used by the Seventh Day Adventists starting in 1869, but that church did not survive either.

Woodburn boasts its share of philanthropic citizens. For example, after the Great Chicago Fire of 1871, the Congregational Church donated $43.75 to the cause. One of its members, Rosa Bird, was a missionary to China. She was killed in the Boxer Rebellion of 1900.

==== Cemeteries ====
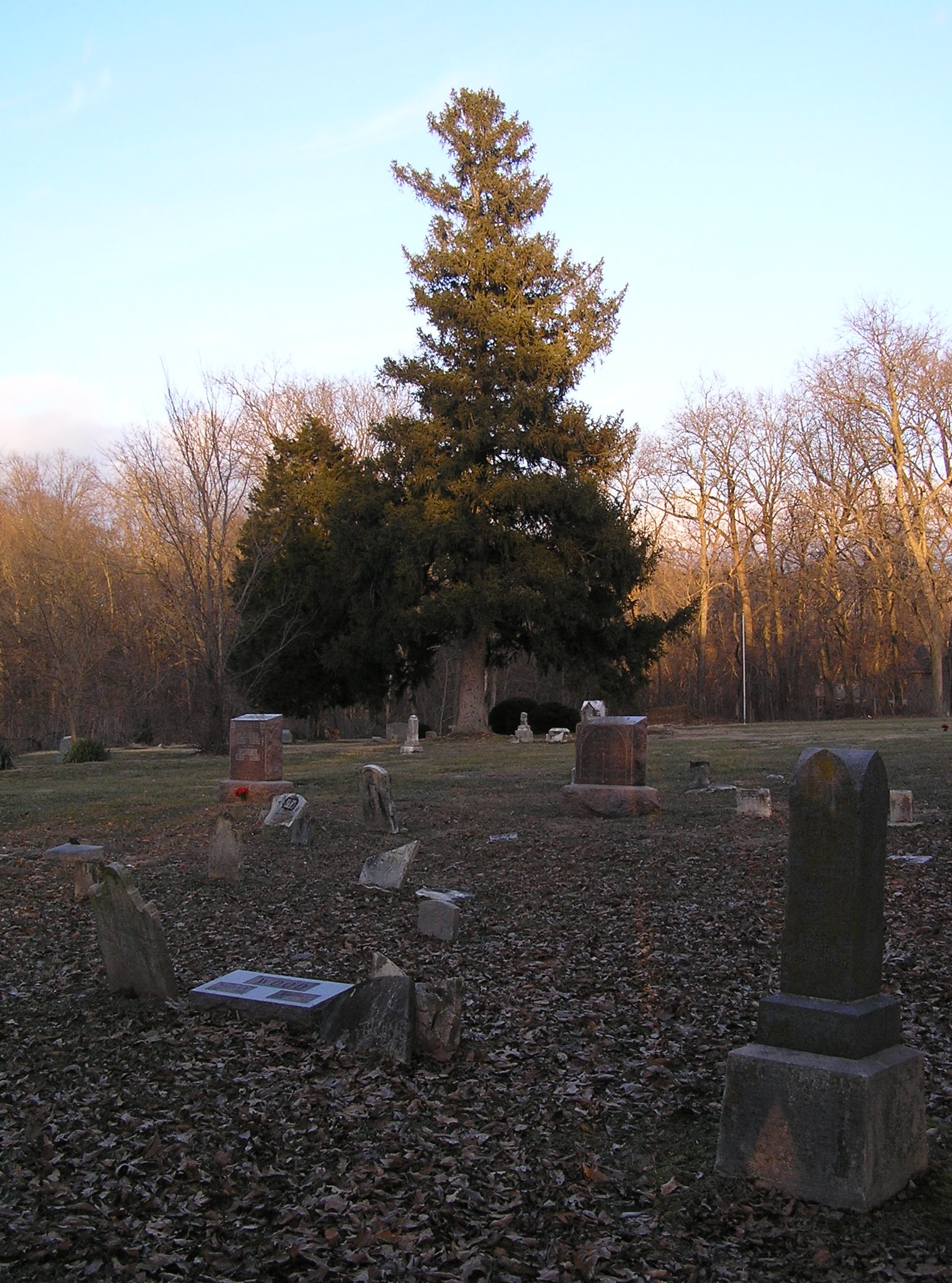
Wood Cemetery

Containing the graves of many of the founding citizens of Woodburn, the Wood Cemetery about two miles south of town goes back to at least 1823. While several of the founding families are represented here, of particular note are the graves of two of the seven Wood brothers - James and Abraham - and their wives. Also here are the graves of four of James' sons - John, Samuel, Thomas, and James - and their wives.

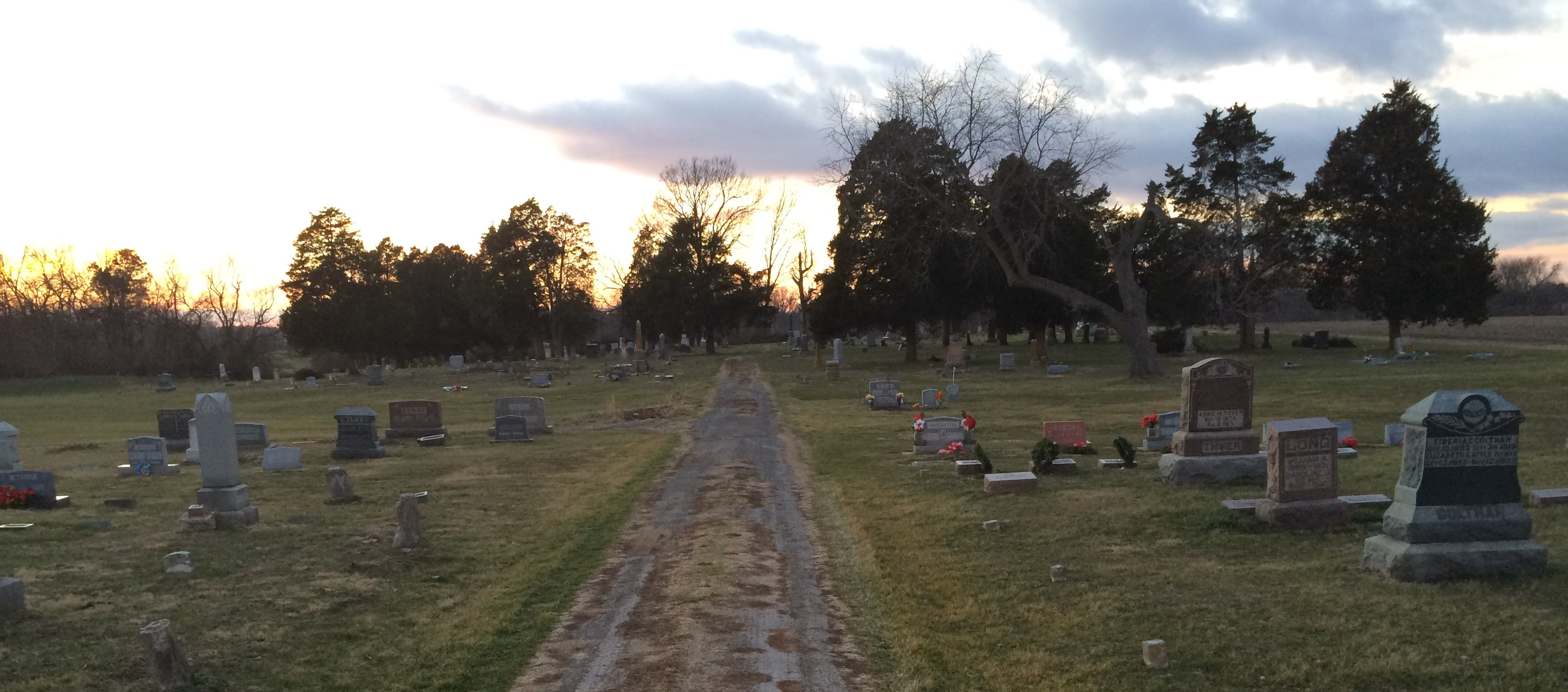
Woodburn Cemetery

Organized in 1866, the Woodburn Cemetery on the outskirts of the town includes the small burial ground originally used by the Rider family (now in the northwest corner of the cemetery). Half of the land for the cemetery was purchased by the village; the other half was donated by Mr. Huggins. The oldest grave dates to 1844. Many soldiers are buried here. One notable grave is that of Jonathan Lucas Wood, nephew of the Wood brothers who founded the town.

=== Decline ===
The Alton and Terre Haute railroad was originally planned to pass through Woodburn, but a decision was made that sent it through Bunker Hill instead. Rail travel was much preferred to stagecoach, so as a result of this decision, Bunker Hill began to grow and Woodburn began to fade.

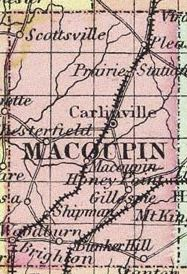
Macoupin County portion of an 1855 Illinois county map.

Woodburn was formally incorporated in 1867, but that was the peak of its growth. Already by 1891, its population was only 267 people. That had dropped to 175 by 1911.

The Woodburn post office closed in 1907.

In 1948, with the establishment of a Community Unit District, rural schools such as Benner School began to be closed in favor of transporting children to a centralized location. In 1952, the Woodburn school was the only school in the district besides Meissner School in Bunker Hill. Two teachers taught 59 students in three rooms.

Also in 1948, the same tornado that almost completely leveled Bunker Hill also destroyed several homes in Woodburn and killed four people.

The last in a progression of Woodburn general stores closed in 1975.

=== Today ===
Few features remain to indicate that Woodburn is more than a simple cluster of homes.

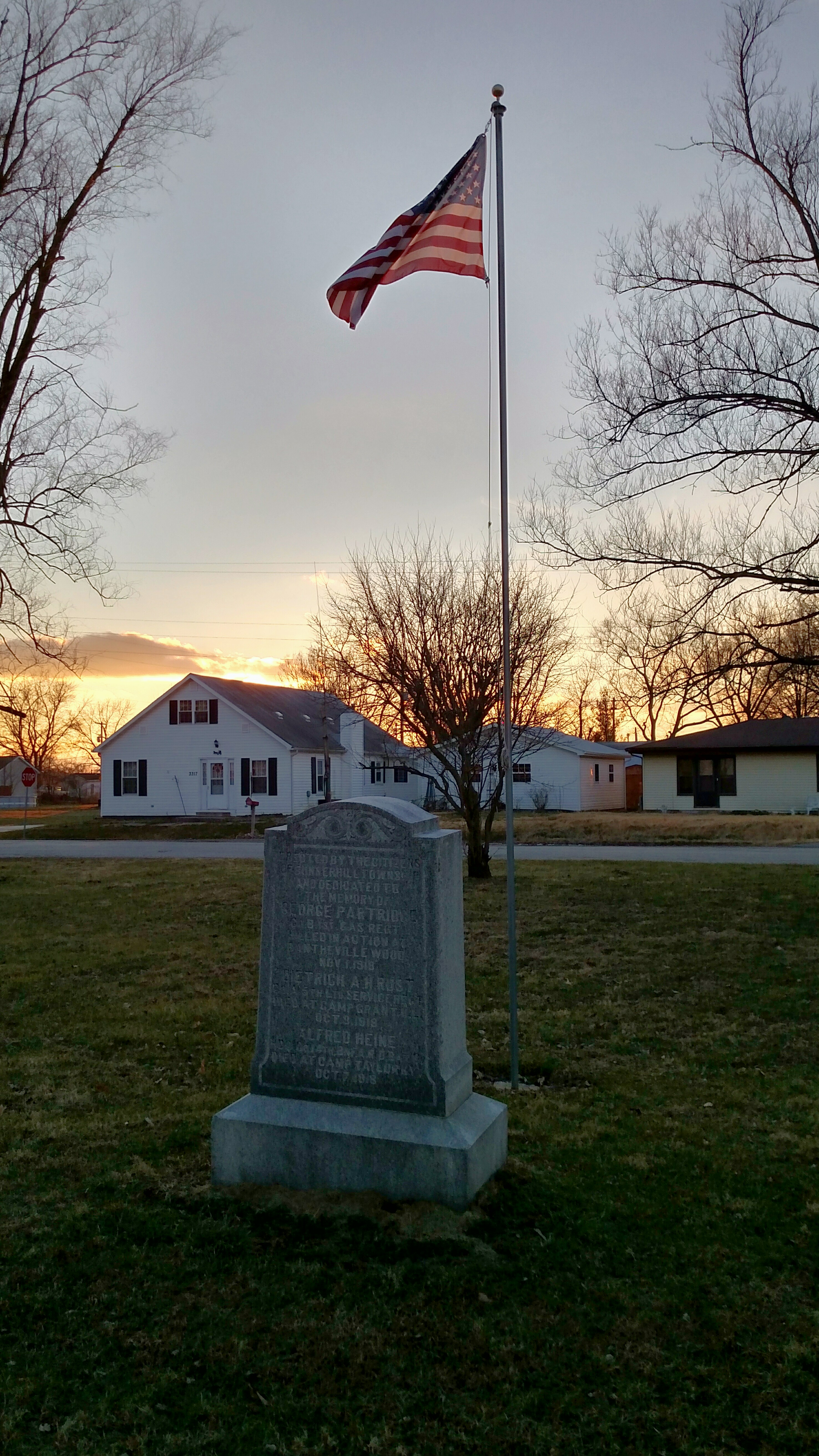
Memorial to three soldiers who died during World War I

A monument in the public square was erected by the citizens of the township to remember three residents who died in the army during World War I. Their names were George Partridge, Dietrich A.H. Rust, and Alfred Heine.

Many of the stones in both Wood Cemetery and Woodburn Cemetery are in bad shape and are nearly illegible. Some of them have been replaced with newer monuments, however.

The current Baptist Church (Calvary) has met in what was the old Woodburn School building on Chestnut Street since 1956. In 1962 the brick front was added, and several other improvements were made. Other changes include a parsonage in 1968, a baptistry in 1974, and a bell tower in 1990.

The Congregational Church had to be rebuilt, a two year project, because of extensive storm damage in 1960. It is currently named Woodburn Bible Church.

The former Presbyterian Church is currently named Country Bible Church.

Home-canned foods may be purchased at the Woodburn Country Store. The store distributes its products widely. This is currently the only business with a visible presence in the village.

A water tower bearing the village name stands on the northern edge of Woodburn.

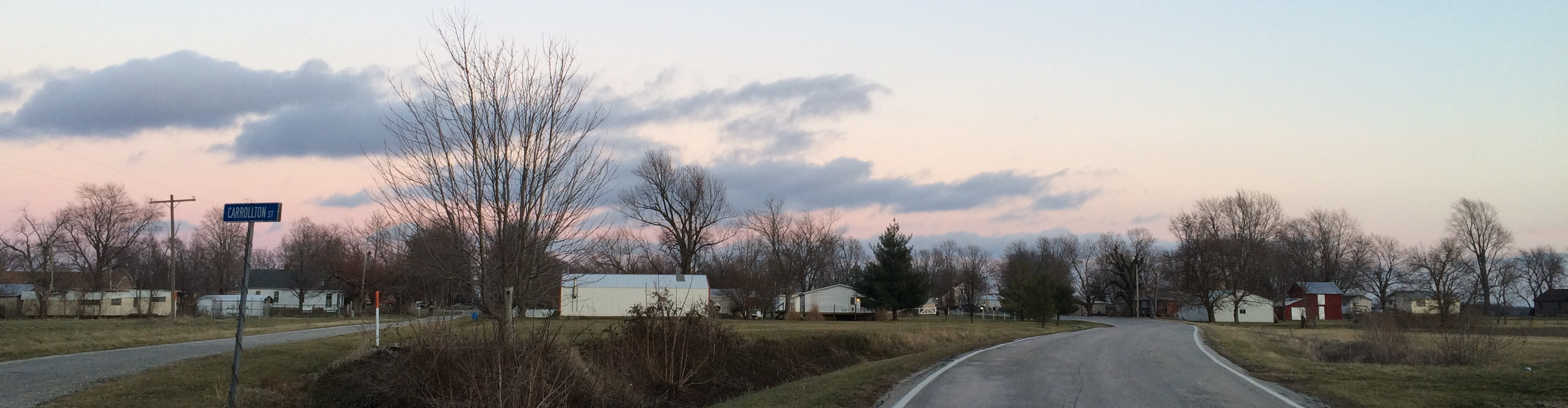
View of Woodburn approaching from the west
