= The Bank of Edwardsville =

- Industry: Financial services
- Founded: 1868; 158 years ago
- Defunct: 2019
- Fate: merged into Busey Bank
- Headquarters: 330 West Vandalia Street, Edwardsville, Illinois, United States
- Key people: Kevin Powers (CEO and President)
- Parent: Banc Ed Corp

The Bank of Edwardsville was a traditional American bank founded in 1868 and located in Edwardsville, Illinois. The bank provided retail banking services such as personal savings and checking accounts, money market accounts, Christmas Club accounts and consumer loans. Its clients' deposits were insured by the FDIC and they could use 19 bank branches located in Alton, Belleville, Bethalto, Collinsville, Glen Carbon, Granite City, Swansea, St. Louis, etc.

In early 2019, it was acquired by First Busey Corporation, the holding company of Busey Bank. Accounts were subsequently transferred to Busey Bank.

== History ==
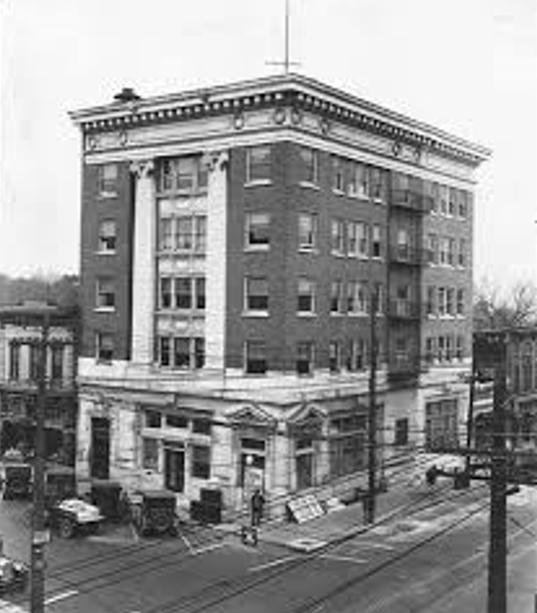
Bank of Edwardsville's main building around 1910

The Bank of Edwardsville established by local businessman Edward M. West and Civil War veteran Willian R. Prickett, the bank first opened on 1 January 1868. The site of the original bank is now the Madison County Administration Building, which acquired the building an held a grand opening ceremony attended by a crowd of 20,000 people on 18 October 1915. The bank endured America's history of economic hardship and upheavals, and survived both world wars and many recessions. Throughout the late 19th and early 20th centuries, robberies of banks were extremely common. According to the Madison County Historical Society, the bank kept a 19th century lever-action rifle to use as protection against bank robbers. It was owned by the first president of the Bank of Edwardsville, who continued to pass it down to every bank president until 2004.

In 2019, the bank was officially acquired by Busey Bank, ending the bank's independent ownership of over 151 years. A previous employee recounts, “The BANK was the best place I’ve ever worked. Hated to see it go away... I still think about [it] often.”
