= New Douglas, Illinois =

- Village
- Location in Madison County, Illinois
- Coordinates: 38°58′11″N 89°39′59″W
- Country: United States
- State: Illinois
- County: Madison
- Township: New Douglas

Area
  - Total: 1.05 sq mi (2.72 km^{2})
  - Land: 1.05 sq mi (2.71 km^{2})
  - Water: 0 sq mi (0.00 km^{2})
- Elevation: 620 ft (190 m)

Population (2020)
  - Total: 350
  - Density: 334.0/sq mi (128.97/km^{2})
- Time zone: UTC-6 (CST)
  - Summer (DST): UTC-5 (CDT)
- ZIP code: 62074
- Area codes: 217, 618
- FIPS code: 17-52415
- GNIS feature ID: 2399461

New Douglas is a village in Madison County, Illinois, United States. The population was 350 at the 2020 census.

== History ==
New Douglas was laid out by Alonzo Foster in 1860, the village got its namesake from the Illinois Senator Stephan A. Douglas . The community was centered on the local coal mines and farming into the early 1900s. When need for coal dropped in the 1950s the town fell back on its farming roots, mostly of corn and soybeans.

== Geography ==
New Douglas is located in the northeast corner of Madison County 5 miles (8 km) east of Livingston, 20 miles (32 km) northeast of Edwardsville, the county seat, and 42 miles (68 km) northeast of St. Louis.

According to the U.S. Census Bureau, New Douglas has a total area of 1.05 square miles (2.72 km^{2}), of which 0.002 square miles (0.01 km^{2}), or 0.19%, are water. The village drains west to Silver Creek and southeast to the Little Dry Fork of Shoal Creek. The entire town is within the Kaskaskia River watershed.

== Demographics ==
Historical population
Census	Pop.	Note	%±
1880	400		—
1890	555		38.8%
1900	469		−15.5%
1910	499		6.4%
1920	390		−21.8%
1930	335		−14.1%
1940	345		3.0%
1950	359		4.1%
1960	367		2.2%
1970	378		3.0%
1980	389		2.9%
1990	387		−0.5%
2000	369		−4.7%
2010	319		−13.6%
2020	350		9.7%
U.S. Decennial Census

As of the census of 2000, there were 369 people, 147 households, and 105 families residing in the village. The population density was 345.6 inhabitants per square mile (133.4/km^{2}). There were 178 housing units at an average density of 166.7 per square mile (64.4/km^{2}). The racial makeup of the village was 97.29% White, 0.81% Native American, 0.27% Asian, and 1.63% from two or more races. Hispanic or Latino of any race were 2.98% of the population.

There were 147 households, out of which 26.5% had children under the age of 18 living with them, 56.5% were married couples living together, 8.8% had a female householder with no husband present, and 27.9% were non-families. 24.5% of all households were made up of individuals, and 9.5% had someone living alone who was 65 years of age or older. The average household size was 2.51 and the average family size was 2.91.

In the village, the population was spread out, with 23.3% under the age of 18, 9.5% from 18 to 24, 25.2% from 25 to 44, 27.6% from 45 to 64, and 14.4% who were 65 years of age or older. The median age was 39 years. For every 100 females, there were 101.6 males. For every 100 females age 18 and over, there were 102.1 males.

The median income for a household in the village was $30,417, and the median income for a family was $40,833. Males had a median income of $28,750 versus $21,250 for females. The per capita income for the village was $14,617. About 5.5% of families and 9.7% of the population were below the poverty line, including 13.6% of those under age 18 and 8.2% of those age 65 or over.

== Education ==
New Douglas is served by Highland Community Unit School District 5.
