= Busey =

Busey may refer to:

- Gary Busey, American actor
- Jake Busey, American actor, son of Gary Busey
- Diablo Cody, pen name of Academy Award-winning screenwriter Brooke Busey-Hunt
- Busey Bank, US-based financial holding company
