= AE Harmon =

Archaeological site in Edwardsville, Illinois

AE Harmon is an archaeological site that was in use during the Archaic, Late Woodland, Emergent Mississippian, and Mississippian periods, according to the most recent archaeological evidence. This site is located near the American Bottom in modern-day Edwardsville, Illinois. There were a total of three recorded excavations; one took place during the 1990s by the Southern Illinois University Edwardsville (SIUE) Contract Archaeology Program (CAP) and the two others took place during the early 2000s. A number of features were excavated, uncovering various different artifacts, plant remains and providing evidence for during which the site was in use. With all the data gained, it was predicted that AE Harmon was a horticultural environment.

== Excavation History ==
In 1990, the SIUE CAP conducted a shovel-test on the site. They excavated a structure partially that was in the shape of a keyhole which was about 100 meters east of the excavation that took place in 2002, and it was dated to the Late Woodland Period. In 2000, about 10 meters south of AE Harmon was excavated by the Illinois Transportation Archaeological Research Program (ITARP). This site was dated to the Late Woodland, Emergent Mississippian and Mississippian Periods. In 2002, the students of SIUE archaeology field school took place at the AE Harmon site and about 0.2% of the site was excavated. During these most recent excavations in 2002, there was a total of eight features excavated. The students found new paleoethnobotanical evidence and data that proves the site's use and occupation during the Late Woodland and Emergent Mississippian Periods.

== Features and Artifacts ==
There were 8 features in total that were excavated during the 2002 excavations that were done by the archaeology field school of SIUE.

=== Feature 101 (F101) ===
Pit feature 101 was one of the features that was located on the western side of the site. It was the deepest pit (50 cm) on that block of the excavation area and was similar in characteristics to F102 and F106, in that they all had dark, organic and artifact-rich sediment. Late Woodland ceramics were discovered in this pit, which helped archaeologists understand the function of the pit. It was a storage pit that was, over time, converted into a trash receptacle.

=== Feature 102 (F102) ===
Pit feature 102 was located on the eastern side of the site. Similarly to F101, this pit was deep (75 cm) and was characterized by dark, organic, and artifact-rich sediment. Late Woodland and Late Woodland Sponemann (750-800 CE) phase ceramics were found in this pit. These periods were identified through a typology of notches that were on the exterior of the ceramic rims, such as Z-twist cord-markings. In this pit there were also several arrow points found dating to the Late Woodland-Emergent Mississippian period.

=== Feature 103 (F103) ===
Feature 103 was not a pit; F103 was a small structure located on the eastern side of the site that looked like a keyhole because it had an entry ramp and 25 post molds that resembled wall structures along the perimeter of the feature. This feature was revealed when F102 was being expanded. Various types of pottery were discovered towards the center of the structure consisting of vessels, jars and stump-ware. There was also a rim sherd found on the entry ramp that had Sponemann typology markings. This led archaeologists to believe this feature and related features, such as F102, dated to the Sponemann phase.

=== Feature 104 (F104) ===
Feature 104 was a rather shallow (10 cm) pit compared to the pits discussed above. It was located on the western side of the site. This pit was characterized by its pale sediment and fire-cracked rock (FCR) that was found in the pit. There were a few body sherds found in this pit, however, archaeologists believed this to be intrusive due to their scarcity. Due to the lack of artifacts found and the paleness of the sediment, this pit is dated to the Archaic period.

=== Feature 105 (F105) ===
Similarly to feature 104, this pit was shallow, had pale sediment, contained FCR and few (possibly) intrusive body sherds, and was the third pit on the western side of the site. This pit was also dated to the Archaic period.

=== Feature 106 (F106) ===
Feature 106 was the deepest (46 cm) pit out of all the three other pits located on the eastern side of the site. This feature was similar to F101 and F102, in that it was characterized by its dark, organic and artifact-rich sediment. In this pit, there were ceramics dating to the Late Woodland period, such as discussed in the previous features, and was used as a storage pit that slowly turned into a trash receptacle as new settlers came in contact with the feature. There was one rim that was different from the others found in this feature; this rim had Late Woodland Patrick phase (A.D. 650-900) style, however, after further analysis it was determined to be intrusive because there were no body sherds that matched this style. Bloated pottery suggests this feature was used for pottery-making during the Sponemann phase

=== Feature 107 (F107) ===
There were no artifacts found on this feature located on the eastern side of the site. It looked to be the aftermath of a shovel-test from an earlier excavation project.

=== Feature 108 (F108) ===
Feature 108 was a deeper (30 cm) pit that was located on the eastern side of the site. Similarly to F104 and F105, this feature was characterized by pale sediment and FCR found, however, it differed in that archaeologists found several cobble stones that were not present in F104 and F105. Archaeologists concluded that this feature also dated to the Archaic period because of the lack of ceramics and pale sediment.

=== Other Artifacts ===
Materials found in the plow zone such as arrow points suggest that the AE Harmon settlers were involved in hunting as well during the Late Woodland period, aside from their horticulture activities. Further artifacts such as hoe flakes were also recovered from the plow zone and they reinforce the horticulture environment created by settlers. There were also flake tools, manos and hammerstones that suggest stone tool manufacturing and food management as important activities during all time periods.

== Plant Remains ==
Although the 2002 excavation was relatively small, using flotation methods, archaeologists were able to collect various data of paleoethnobotanical evidence present at the site during excavation. Not all pit features contained plant remains, as they were all used for different functions.

=== Wood ===
The most abundant type of wood that was found on this site was oak. There were several different types of oaks found on the Sponemann phase F102, F103 and F106, including white oak, red oak, and indeterminate oak and they were all found in charcoal form. Red oak was the most common amongst all three features. There were other types of woods such as: elm and hackberry (F102F106), black walnut and butternut (F102F106), and sycamore and sassafras. The Edelhardt phase (A.D.1000-1050) features did not contain very much wood charcoal. There was a very small portion of red oak and a small portion of unidentifiable wood charcoal found on F103.

=== Nutshell ===
The most abundant type of nutshell found on the site was acorn. Archaeologists found it the most in F106, with up to 139 samples found in one stratum (stratum C). This nutshell was not a very common part of assemblages found in the American Bottom before the Late Woodland period, and archaeologists speculate that people may have preferred other nutshells as opposed to acorns since they required extra care. Other types of nutshell found on this site were: thick-shelled hickory and black walnut (F102F103F106).

=== Seeds ===
The most seeds were found in Sponemann phase features F102, F103 and F106, with seeds such as, erect knotweed and maygrass. These seeds are believed to be cultivated. Other types of seeds present were goosefoot, little barley, purslane, blackberry and raspberry, all of which were found in the Sponemann phase features listed above. There were a variety of seeds already discussed that were also found in the Edelhardt phase F103. These were seeds such as, goosefoot, maygrass, and knotweed, with goosefoot being the most common one (67 samples). New cultigens and edible seeds identified in the Edelhardt phase F103 were sunflower, several bean family specimens, panic grass, rush, prickly mallow and nightshade.

=== Cucurbits ===
Cucurbits or cucurbitaceae were found in both Sponemann and Edelhardt phase features, however, they were found in small rind fragments. It was unusual that there was evidence found on features for both of these sites because most of the squash were consumed and usually did not preserve well unless extra measures were taken so that it could preserve. It is also uncertain whether or not these were native to AE Harmon.

=== Maize ===
There was one maize kernel found in F106, a Sponemann phase feature, and one maize embryo and seven kernel fragments in F103, an Edelhardt phase feature. The maize kernel found in F106 is thought to be intrusive due to the bioturbation that occurred in the stratum in which the kernel was found. Although there was not very much maize evidence, maize holds a greater significance for the American Bottom, as the period shifted from family-owned food to communal food. Whenever there is evidence of maize found, it is usually associated with Sponemann groups indicating that Sponemann immigrants were likely the ones responsible for their introduction to the American Bottom. The adoption of maize was not uniform and evidence suggests those families with less resources were the first to risk its adoption.

== Significance ==
There were a significant amount of material and plant remains discovered on the small scale excavation that took place in 2002, making it evident that AE Harmon was in use from the Archaic through the Mississippian periods. The function of this site was never constant and the analysis of each of these data sets helped archaeologists know settlement and site function patterns. These excavations were very small-scale so their findings may be biased to one area of the site only.
