= Olive Township, Madison County, Illinois =

Olive Township
- Township

- Location of Illinois in the United States
- Coordinates: 38°57′35″N 89°45′40″W
- Country: United States
- State: Illinois
- County: Madison
- Settled: November 2, 1875

Area
  - Total: 31.52 sq mi (81.6 km^{2})
  - Land: 31.19 sq mi (80.8 km^{2})
  - Water: 0.33 sq mi (0.85 km^{2})
- Elevation: 587 ft (179 m)

Population (2010)
  - Estimate (2016): 1,734
  - Density: 57.2/sq mi (22.1/km^{2})
- Time zone: UTC-6 (CST)
  - Summer (DST): UTC-5 (CDT)
- FIPS code: 17-119-55834

Olive Township is located in Madison County, Illinois, in the United States. As of the 2010 census, its population was 1,785 and it contained 842 housing units. The township's administrative offices are located in the village of Livingston.

== History ==
Olive Township was organized in 1876. Abel Olive was an early settler.

== Geography ==
According to the 2010 census, the township has a total area of 31.52 square miles (81.6 km^{2}), of which 31.19 square miles (80.8 km^{2}) (or 98.95%) is land and 0.33 square miles (0.85 km^{2}) (or 1.05%) is water.

Interstate 55, Illinois Route 4 and the former U.S. Route 66 all pass through the township.

There are two villages located in the township: Livingston and Williamson.

== Demographics ==
Historical population
| Census | Pop. | Note | %± |
|---|---|---|---|
| 2016 (est.) | 1,734 |
U.S. Decennial Census
