= Donkville, Illinois =

- Unincorporated community
- Location within Illinois Location within the United States
- Coordinates: 38°41′50″N 89°58′46″W
- Country: United States
- State: Illinois
- County: Madison
- Elevation: 515 ft (157 m)
- Time zone: UTC-6 (Central (CST))
  - Summer (DST): UTC-5 (CDT)
- Area code: 618
- GNIS feature ID: 1736026

Donkville is an unincorporated community in Madison County, in the U.S. state of Illinois.

== History ==
A post office was established at Donkville in 1901, and remained in operation until 1907. The community's name honors Emile Donk, the owner of a local mine.
