= Williamson, Illinois =

- Village
- Location in Madison County, Illinois
- Coordinates: 38°59′08″N 89°45′47″W
- Country: United States
- State: Illinois
- County: Madison
- Township: Olive

Area
  - Total: 1.22 sq mi (3.16 km^{2})
  - Land: 1.17 sq mi (3.03 km^{2})
  - Water: 0.046 sq mi (0.12 km^{2})
- Elevation: 604 ft (184 m)

Population (2020)
  - Total: 183
  - Density: 156.2/sq mi (60.32/km^{2})
- Time zone: UTC-6 (CST)
  - Summer (DST): UTC-5 (CDT)
- ZIP code: 62088 (Staunton)
- Area code: 618
- FIPS code: 17-81815
- GNIS feature ID: 2399696

Williamson is a village in Madison County, Illinois, United States. The population was 183 at the 2020 census, down from 230 in 2010.

== History ==
Williamson had its start as a coal town. The village is named for the land's original owners, John and Matthew Williamson.

== Geography ==
Williamson is bordered to the south by the village of Livingston and to the north by Macoupin County. Interstate 55 passes just east of the village, with access from Exit 37 in Livingston. St. Louis is 40 miles (64 km) to the southwest, and Springfield is 58 miles (93 km) to the north.

According to the U.S. Census Bureau, Williamson has a total area of 1.2 square miles (3.1 km^{2}), of which 0.05 square miles (0.13 km^{2}), or 3.86%, are water. The village is drained to the southeast by tributaries of Silver Creek, a south-flowing tributary of the Kaskaskia River.

== Demographics ==
Historical population
Census	Pop.	Note	%±
1910	648		—
1920	805		24.2%
1930	518		−35.7%
1940	412		−20.5%
1950	319		−22.6%
1960	324		1.6%
1970	324		0.0%
1980	319		−1.5%
1990	278		−12.9%
2000	251		−9.7%
2010	230		−8.4%
2020	183		−20.4%
U.S. Decennial Census

As of the census of 2000, there were 251 people, 99 households, and 66 families residing in the village. The population density was 165.4 inhabitants per square mile (63.9/km^{2}). There were 112 housing units at an average density of 73.8 per square mile (28.5/km^{2}). The racial makeup of the village was 97.61% White and 2.39% Native American.

There were 99 households, out of which 33.3% had children under the age of 18 living with them, 51.5% were married couples living together, 15.2% had a female householder with no husband present, and 33.3% were non-families. 26.3% of all households were made up of individuals, and 18.2% had someone living alone who was 65 years of age or older. The average household size was 2.54 and the average family size was 3.08.

In the village, the population was spread out, with 26.7% under the age of 18, 7.6% from 18 to 24, 33.1% from 25 to 44, 18.3% from 45 to 64, and 14.3% who were 65 years of age or older. The median age was 37 years. For every 100 females, there were 109.2 males. For every 100 females age 18 and over, there were 97.8 males.

The median income for a household in the village was $23,750, and the median income for a family was $37,500. Males had a median income of $31,250 versus $20,000 for females. The per capita income for the village was $12,988. About 8.9% of families and 14.4% of the population were below the poverty line, including 14.5% of those under the age of eighteen and 6.3% of those 65 or over.

== Education ==
It is in the Staunton Community Unit School District 6.
