= Newport, Illinois =

- Community
- Location within Illinois Location within the United States
- Coordinates: 38°40′51″N 90°10′33″W
- Country: United States
- State: Illinois
- County: Madison
- Elevation: 413 ft (126 m)
- Time zone: UTC-6 (Central (CST))
  - Summer (DST): UTC-5 (CDT)
- Area code: 618
- GNIS feature ID: 423022

Newport is a community located within the city of Madison in Madison County, Illinois, United States.

== History ==
Newport was laid out in 1858.
