= Livingston, Illinois =

- Village
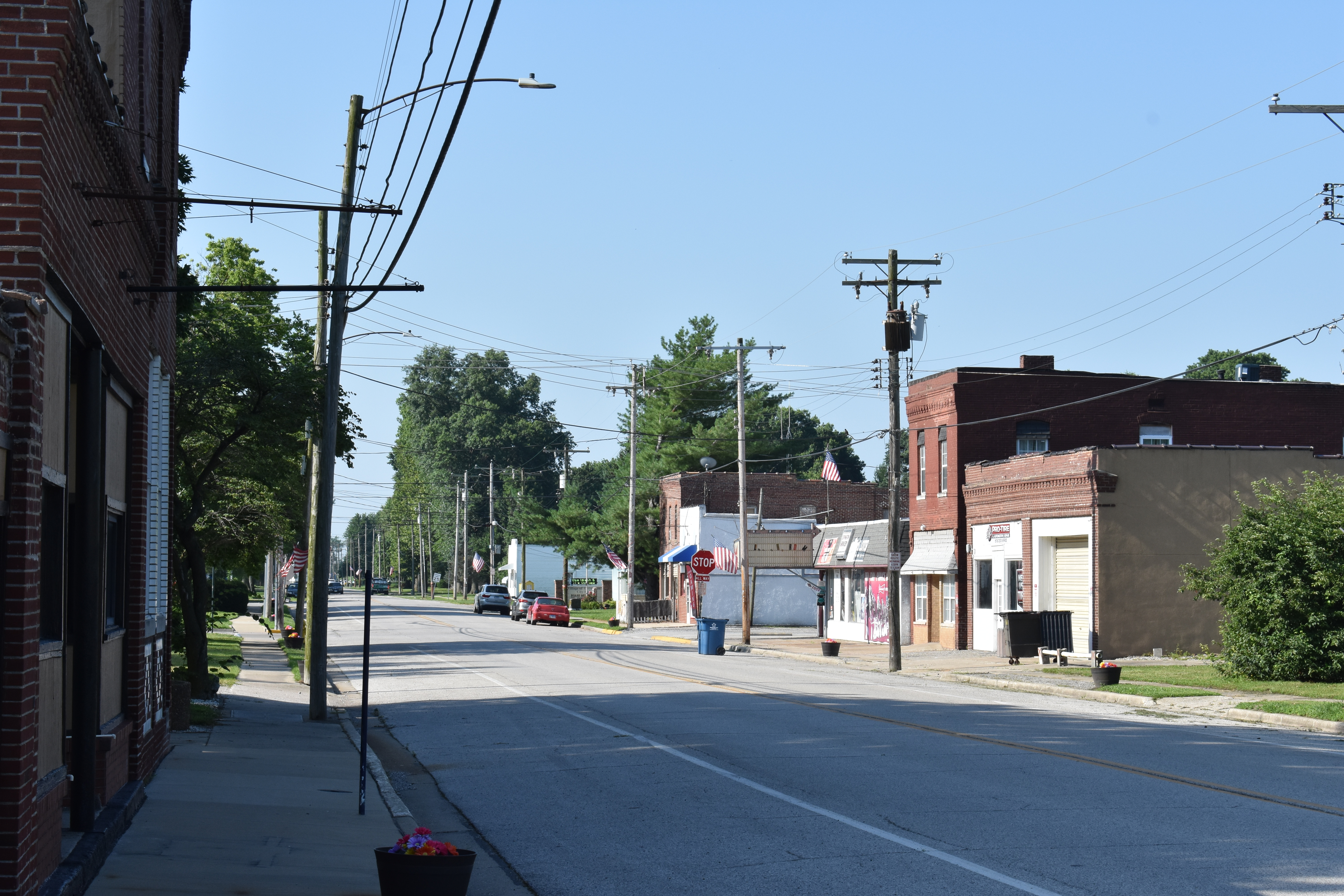
- Downtown Livingston

- Location in Madison County, Illinois
- Coordinates: 38°58′06″N 89°45′51″W
- Country: United States
- State: Illinois
- County: Madison
- Township: Olive

Area
  - Total: 1.05 sq mi (2.73 km^{2})
  - Land: 1.04 sq mi (2.69 km^{2})
  - Water: 0.012 sq mi (0.03 km^{2})
- Elevation: 591 ft (180 m)

Population (2020)
  - Total: 763
  - Density: 733.6/sq mi (283.25/km^{2})
- Time zone: UTC-6 (CST)
  - Summer (DST): UTC-5 (CDT)
- ZIP code: 62058
- Area code: 618
- FIPS code: 17-44160
- GNIS feature ID: 2398457
- Website: villageoflivingston.us

Livingston is a village in Madison County, Illinois, United States. The population was 763 at the 2020 census, down from 858 in 2010.

== History ==
Livingston had its start by the building of the railroad and the opening of a mine in the neighborhood. Livingston was laid out about 1904 by the heirs of John Livingston. The village was incorporated on November 15, 1905.

== Geography ==
Livingston is located in northeastern Madison County and is bordered to the north by the village of Williamson. Interstate 55 passes through the southeast corner of Livingston, with access from Exit 37 (New Douglas Road). I-55 leads southwest 37 miles (60 km) to St. Louis and north 58 miles (93 km) to Springfield, the Illinois capital.

According to the U.S. Census Bureau, Livingston has a total area of 1.05 square miles (2.72 km^{2}), of which 0.01 square miles (0.03 km^{2}), or 1.23%, are water. The village is drained to the south by tributaries of Silver Creek, a south-flowing tributary of the Kaskaskia River.

== Demographics ==
Historical population
Census	Pop.	Note	%±
1910	1,092		—
1920	1,365		25.0%
1930	1,447		6.0%
1940	1,115		−22.9%
1950	999		−10.4%
1960	964		−3.5%
1970	916		−5.0%
1980	949		3.6%
1990	928		−2.2%
2000	825		−11.1%
2010	858		4.0%
2020	763		−11.1%
U.S. Decennial Census

As of the census of 2000, there were 825 people, 367 households, and 237 families residing in the village. The population density was 777.5 inhabitants per square mile (300.2/km^{2}). There were 396 housing units at an average density of 373.2 per square mile (144.1/km^{2}). The racial makeup of the village was 98.91% White, 0.24% Asian, and 0.85% from two or more races. Hispanic or Latino of any race were 0.24% of the population.

There were 367 households, out of which 27.2% had children under the age of 18 living with them, 49.9% were married couples living together, 9.3% had a female householder with no husband present, and 35.4% were non-families. 31.9% of all households were made up of individuals, and 15.8% had someone living alone who was 65 years of age or older. The average household size was 2.25 and the average family size was 2.81.

In the village, the population was spread out, with 23.3% under the age of 18, 7.0% from 18 to 24, 30.5% from 25 to 44, 19.6% from 45 to 64, and 19.5% who were 65 years of age or older. The median age was 38 years. For every 100 females, there were 101.7 males. For every 100 females age 18 and over, there were 96.0 males.

The median income for a household in the village was $37,083, and the median income for a family was $41,563. Males had a median income of $34,444 versus $19,271 for females. The per capita income for the village was $16,291. About 7.8% of families and 9.1% of the population were below the poverty line, including 7.6% of those under age 18 and 6.8% of those age 65 or over.

== Education ==
It is in the Staunton Community Unit School District 6.
