= St. Morgan, Illinois =

- Unincorporated community
- Nickname: Toenniestown
- Motto: Hail Mayor Toennies
- Location within Illinois Location within the United States
- Coordinates: 38°39′44″N 89°41′15″W
- Country: United States
- State: Illinois
- County: Madison
- Elevation: 505 ft (154 m)
- Time zone: UTC-6 (Central (CST))
  - Summer (DST): UTC-5 (CDT)
- Area code: 618
- GNIS feature ID: 423148

St. Morgan is an unincorporated community in Madison County, Illinois, United States.

== History ==
St. Morgan was named for its founder and first postmaster, E. M. Morgan.
