= Herrin (surname) =

Herrin is a surname. Notable people with the surname include:

- Earl E. Herrin (1892–1964), American businessman and politician
- Jeremy Herrin, English theatre director
- Josh Herrin (born 1990), American motorcycle racer
- Judith Herrin (born 1942), English archaeologist and academic
- Kendra and Maliyah Herrin (born 2002), former conjoined twins
- Rich Herrin (born 1933), American basketball coach
- Tim Herrin (born 1996), American baseball player
- Tom Herrin (1929–1999), American baseball player
- William F. Herrin (1854–1927), American lawyer, businessman and banker
