= The Invincible Thieves =

The Invincible Thieves was the name given to a group of would-be extortionists who operated in Madison County, Illinois during January 1901. The case received newspaper coverage from Butte, Montana, to Syracuse, New York.

== First letters ==
On January 11, 1901 the first letters were delivered, demanding four farmers assemble $1,410.00 and deliver it to a designated spot on a local highway on the night of Saturday, January 19. Should they fail to do so, their homes would be dynamited. The four farmers were Leonard Hoehn, John Huebner, Fred Penning, and George Schillinger. Later a local banker, Herman Schriber, received a similar demand for the sum of $2,500 (half in gold, half in currency) to be paid the same night; in his case the dynamite was to be used on local businesses. The letters were signed "The Invincible Thieves". It was later reported that similar letters were delivered to other prominent residents of the area.

Initial response varied. A local newspaper called the affair a "snipe hunt" and canard. Local farmers set up a night patrol of the roads designated for the payments. Alton Deputy sheriff Dreisoerner and 75 men were out on the night of the 19th, to no avail.

== Second round; gunfire; letter to chief of police ==
The farmers received another round of notices that their homes would be destroyed and cattle poisoned. The case took a serious turn on Sunday, January 27, when a revolver was fired through a window of the George Schillinger home. The 38 caliber bullet missed Mr. Schillinger, grazed the arm of his hired man, and lodged in a wall. Sheriff Joseph Hotz investigated, and mentioned the possibility of a $1,000 reward. It was said that local farmers were offering a $500 reward. On Monday, January 28, the Alton Chief of Police, Ferd Volbracht, received a letter, "poorly written and spelled worse", threatening arson and murder if he did not cease his investigation into the "invincible thieves". Two detectives from St. Louis, Missouri, were added to the investigative forces.

== Arrests ==
On Wednesday, February 6, the Alton Evening Telegraph reported that "at least one arrest of the Invincible thieves was made last Monday and the leader of the gang... has been in jail since that time." The prisoner was one Nicholas Gregory, saloon keeper and former postmaster of Oldenburg. In a confession he expressed his belief that the four farmers were responsible for his forced resignation from the postmaster position. He thought if he frightened them enough, they would move away from Madison County and he would be able to regain his job. The confession was said to implicate several other men in the extortion and dynamiting plot.

Two more alleged plotters, Joseph Goudie and Joe Slumpstick were arrested. Goudie was later identified as a farm hand, formerly employed by George Schillinger, Slumpstick as a stranger. On Saturday, February 9, the case took a "sensational" turn when two prominent citizens of Alton were arrested. John Boals was a local businessman, Willis L. Fairman an attorney. Both protested their innocence vociferously, but were incarcerated anyway.

Boals and Fairman were identified by John Huebner, one of the original victims of the plot, as having presented themselves to him as money brokers asking if he had any money to lend. Robert Kelsey, another local farmer, alleged a loss of $1,000 "by similar methods" shortly before the "invincible thieves" letters were delivered. There was speculation whether a married couple formerly employed by Mr. Huebner, who had stolen $365 from him and were tried and convicted in 1898, were involved in the "invincible thieves" conspiracy.

== Indictments and trials ==
Gregory, Goudie and Slumpstick faded from the public view. Boals and Fairman were jailed until a hearing on Monday, February 18, when the state's attorney asked for a continuance. The case was postponed until February 28 and the two men were allowed to file bonds in the amount of $3,000 apiece and released. On April 25 the grand jury of the Madison County Circuit Court returned four indictments against Boals, Fairman and Gregory. Boals and Fairman again posted bond, this time in the amount of $4,000 each, and remained at liberty.

At the end of January, 1902, Boals and Fairman were again indicted by the grand jury, this time for "confidence game". A third bond, of $2,000 each, was required. Nicholas Gregory remained in the county jail, where he "continued to make alleged confessions".

The first trial was not held until March 20, 1902. The Judge "discharged J. L. Boals, the State having failed completely to make even a circumstantial case against him." Fairman and Gregory were not tried until June 24, 1902. The case against Fairman was dismissed; jury selection was begun for the case against Gregory. Witnesses included Charles Hunt and Harry Funk, of Thiel's detective agency in St. Louis. Sheriff Hotz "stated that at the time he knew Gregory was preparing to leave and nipped the plans by the arrest. Gregory has been in jail since February 4, 1901. "The letters introduced in evidence were wonderful things. Each letter, and many farmers received them contained about 3,000 words all printed with a pen after the fashion of child's writing." On Friday, June 27, 1902 Nicholas Gregory was found guilty of extortion. The jury also found Gregory to have been insane when the act was committed, but to have since recovered his reason. The judge discharged him, and the former prisoner regained his liberty after sixteen months in jail.
