= Wanda, Illinois =

- Unincorporated community
- Location within Illinois Location within the United States
- Coordinates: 38°50′04″N 90°02′19″W
- Country: United States
- State: Illinois
- County: Madison
- Elevation: 443 ft (135 m)
- Time zone: UTC-6 (Central (CST))
  - Summer (DST): UTC-5 (CDT)
- Area code: 618
- GNIS feature ID: 420506

Wanda is an unincorporated community in Madison County, Illinois, United States.
