= Earl E. Herrin =

American businessman and politician

Earl Edward Herrin (March 17, 1892–August 21, 1964) was an American businessman and politician.

Herrin was born in St. Jacob, Madison County, Illinois. In 1906, he moved with his family to Edwardsville, Illinois. He went to the Edwardsville public schools and to Shurtleff College. Herrin owned an automobile business in Edwardsville. He served on the Madison County Board and as Madison County Treasurer. Herrin was a Republican. Herrin served in the Illinois House of Representatives in 1925 and 1926. Herrin died at St. Joseph's Hospital in Highland, Illinois.
