= St. Jacob, Illinois =

- Village
- Location in Madison County, Illinois
- Coordinates: 38°43′12″N 89°46′04″W
- Country: United States
- State: Illinois
- County: Madison
- Township: St. Jacob

Area
  - Total: 0.85 sq mi (2.21 km^{2})
  - Land: 0.85 sq mi (2.19 km^{2})
  - Water: 0.0077 sq mi (0.02 km^{2})
- Elevation: 505 ft (154 m)

Population (2020)
  - Total: 1,358
  - Density: 1,604.1/sq mi (619.33/km^{2})
- Time zone: UTC-6 (CST)
  - Summer (DST): UTC-5 (CDT)
- ZIP code: 62281
- Area code: 618
- FIPS code: 17-66859
- GNIS feature ID: 2399164
- Website: www.stjacobil.com

St. Jacob or Saint Jacob is a village in Madison County, Illinois, United States. The population was 1,358 at the 2020 census, up from 1,098 in 2010.

== History ==
St. Jacob derives its name from Jacob Schutz, who operated a store, saloon and tavern called the St. Jacob House. Earl E. Herrin (1892–1964), Illinois state representative and businessman, was born in St. Jacob.

== Geography ==
St. Jacob is located in southeastern Madison County. U.S. Route 40 passes through the north side of the village, leading northeast 6 miles (10 km) to Highland and west the same distance to Troy. Downtown St. Louis is 26 miles (42 km) to the west.

According to the U.S. Census Bureau, St. Jacob has a total area of 0.85 square miles (2.20 km^{2}), of which 0.01 square miles (0.03 km^{2}), or 0.82%, are water. The village drains west to tributaries of Silver Creek, a south-flowing tributary of the Kaskaskia River.

== Demographics ==
Historical population
Census	Pop.	Note	%±
1880	461		—
1890	475		3.0%
1900	464		−2.3%
1910	534		15.1%
1920	485		−9.2%
1930	451		−7.0%
1940	439		−2.7%
1950	478		8.9%
1960	529		10.7%
1970	659		24.6%
1980	792		20.2%
1990	752		−5.1%
2000	801		6.5%
2010	1,098		37.1%
2020	1,358		23.7%
U.S. Decennial Census

=== 2020 census ===
As of the 2020 census, St. Jacob had a population of 1,358. The median age was 35.3 years. 27.0% of residents were under the age of 18 and 10.8% of residents were 65 years of age or older. For every 100 females there were 94.3 males, and for every 100 females age 18 and over there were 90.9 males age 18 and over.

0.0% of residents lived in urban areas, while 100.0% lived in rural areas.

There were 515 households in St. Jacob, of which 42.7% had children under the age of 18 living in them. Of all households, 56.7% were married-couple households, 15.0% were households with a male householder and no spouse or partner present, and 22.9% were households with a female householder and no spouse or partner present. About 23.5% of all households were made up of individuals and 7.6% had someone living alone who was 65 years of age or older.

There were 539 housing units, of which 4.5% were vacant. The homeowner vacancy rate was 0.7% and the rental vacancy rate was 6.2%.

Racial composition as of the 2020 census
Race	Number	Percent
White	1,244	91.6%
Black or African American	16	1.2%
American Indian and Alaska Native	0	0.0%
Asian	8	0.6%
Native Hawaiian and Other Pacific Islander	2	0.1%
Some other race	3	0.2%
Two or more races	85	6.3%
Hispanic or Latino (of any race)	46	3.4%

=== 2000 census ===
At the 2000 census there were 801 people, 301 households, and 232 families in the village. The population density was 1,433.1 inhabitants per square mile (553.3/km^{2}). There were 321 housing units at an average density of 574.3 per square mile (221.7/km^{2}). The racial makeup of the village was 98.25% White, 0.50% Native American, 0.37% Asian, 0.50% from other races, and 0.37% from two or more races. Hispanic or Latino of any race were 1.75%.

Of the 301 households 37.2% had children under the age of 18 living with them, 67.8% were married couples living together, 6.0% had a female householder with no husband present, and 22.9% were non-families. 19.6% of households were one person and 9.0% were one person aged 65 or older. The average household size was 2.66 and the average family size was 3.01.

The age distribution was 27.8% under the age of 18, 8.0% from 18 to 24, 30.3% from 25 to 44, 22.7% from 45 to 64, and 11.1% 65 or older. The median age was 34 years. For every 100 females, there were 99.8 males. For every 100 females age 18 and over, there were 95.9 males.

The median household income was $47,917 and the median family income was $55,417. Males had a median income of $36,000 versus $25,938 for females. The per capita income for the village was $20,340. About 3.3% of families and 9.7% of the population were below the poverty line, including 18.5% of those under age 18 and none of those age 65 or over.

== Education ==
St. Jacob is served by Triad Community Unit School District 2, which operates St. Jacob Elementary School in the village.

== See also ==
- St. Jacob Township, Madison County, Illinois
