= Fort Russell Township, Madison County, Illinois =

Fort Russell Township
- Township

- Location of Illinois in the United States
- Coordinates: 38°52′33″N 89°59′22″W
- Country: United States
- State: Illinois
- County: Madison
- Settled: November 2, 1875

Area
  - Total: 37.16 sq mi (96.2 km^{2})
  - Land: 36.69 sq mi (95.0 km^{2})
  - Water: 0.47 sq mi (1.2 km^{2})
- Elevation: 492 ft (150 m)

Population (2010)
  - Estimate (2016): 9,025
  - Density: 249.3/sq mi (96.3/km^{2})
- Time zone: UTC-6 (CST)
  - Summer (DST): UTC-5 (CDT)
- FIPS code: 17-119-27130

Fort Russell Township is located in Madison County, Illinois, in the United States. As of the 2010 census, its population was 9,146 and it contained 3,903 housing units. With Moro, Meadowbrook, and Holiday Shores being notable communities within the Township.

== History ==
Fort Russell Township takes its name from Fort Russell (est. 1812), which was named for Col. William Russell.

== Geography ==
According to the 2010 census, the township has a total area of 37.16 square miles (96.2 km^{2}), of which 36.69 square miles (95.0 km^{2}) (or 98.74%) is land and 0.47 square miles (1.2 km^{2}) (or 1.26%) is water.

== Demographics ==
Historical population
Census	Pop.	Note	%±
2016 (est.)	9,025
U.S. Decennial Census
