= Omphghent Township, Madison County, Illinois =

Omphghent Township
- Township

- Location of Illinois in the United States
- Coordinates: 38°57′31″N 89°52′18″W
- Country: United States
- State: Illinois
- County: Madison
- Settled: November 2, 1875

Area
  - Total: 33.99 sq mi (88.0 km^{2})
  - Land: 33.55 sq mi (86.9 km^{2})
  - Water: 0.44 sq mi (1.1 km^{2})
- Elevation: 489 ft (149 m)

Population (2010)
  - Estimate (2016): 2,348
  - Density: 71/sq mi (27/km^{2})
- Time zone: UTC-6 (CST)
  - Summer (DST): UTC-5 (CDT)
- FIPS code: 17-119-56068

Omphghent Township is located in Madison County, Illinois, in the United States. As of the 2010 census, its population was 2,381 and it contained 1,021 housing units. It contains part of the census-designated places of Holiday Shores and Prairietown.

== History ==
In 1838, the township was initially named Paddock's Grove, after the first postmaster, Gaius Paddock. That was changed in 1858 to Omph-Ghent, which was the name of a local church. The name is a combination of an acronym Omph (Our Mother of Perpetual Help) plus Ghent, the city in Belgium.

== Geography ==
According to the 2010 census, the township has a total area of 33.99 square miles (88.0 km^{2}), of which 33.55 square miles (86.9 km^{2}) (or 98.71%) is land and 0.44 square miles (1.1 km^{2}) (or 1.29%) is water.

== Demographics ==
Historical population
Census	Pop.	Note	%±
2016 (est.)	2,348
U.S. Decennial Census
