= Alhambra Township, Madison County, Illinois =

Alhambra
- Township
- Location in Madison County

- Location of Alhambra Township in Illinois
- Coordinates: 38°52′17″N 89°46′00″W
- Country: United States
- State: Illinois
- County: Madison
- Settled: November 2, 1875

Area
  - Total: 34.98 sq mi (90.6 km^{2})
  - Land: 34.8 sq mi (90 km^{2})
  - Water: 0.18 sq mi (0.47 km^{2})
- Elevation: 535 ft (163 m)

Population (2020)
  - Total: 1,618
  - Density: 46.5/sq mi (18.0/km^{2})
- Time zone: UTC-6 (CST)
  - Summer (DST): UTC-5 (CDT)
- FIPS code: 17-119-00750

Alhambra Township is located in Madison County, Illinois, in the United States. As of the 2020 census, its population was 1,618 and it contained 648 housing units.

== Geography ==
According to the 2010 census, the township has a total area of 34.98 square miles (90.6 km^{2}), of which 34.8 square miles (90 km^{2}) (or 99.49%) is land and 0.18 square miles (0.47 km^{2}) (or 0.51%) is water.

== Local Government ==
The current mayor is Barbara Randle.

== Demographics ==
Historical population
Census	Pop.	Note	%±
2020	1,618		—
U.S. Decennial Census
