= Madison County, Illinois =

County in Illinois, United States

- County
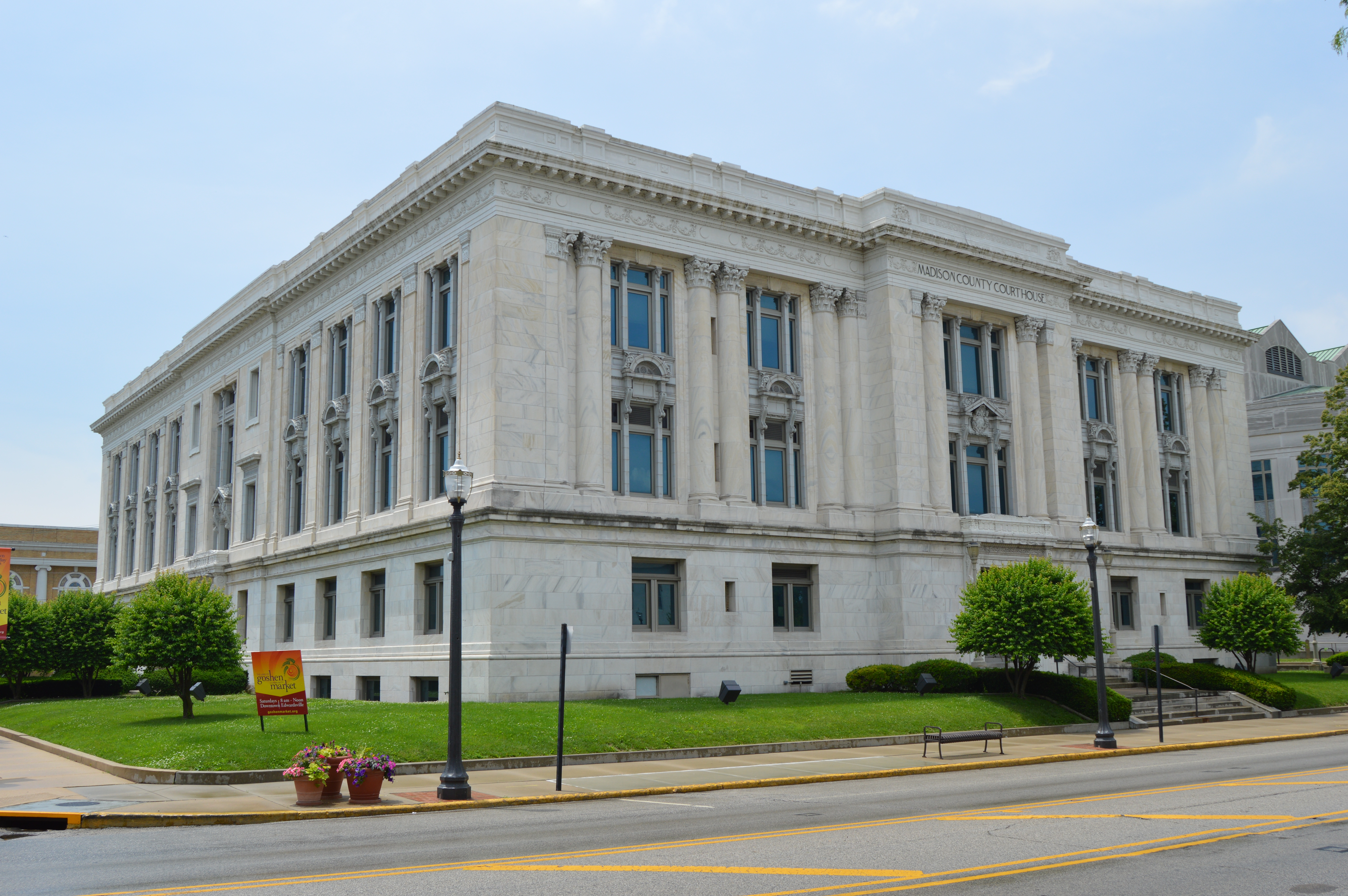
- Madison County Courthouse in Edwardsville

- Seal

- Location within the U.S. state of Illinois
- Coordinates: 38°50′N 89°55′W
- Country: United States
- State: Illinois
- Founded: September 14, 1812
- Named for: James Madison
- Seat: Edwardsville
- Largest city: Granite City

Area
  - Total: 741 sq mi (1,920 km^{2})
  - Land: 716 sq mi (1,850 km^{2})
  - Water: 25 sq mi (65 km^{2}) 3.4%

Population (2020)
  - Total: 265,859
  - Estimate (2025): 263,110 ▼
  - Density: 371/sq mi (143/km^{2})
- Time zone: UTC−6 (Central)
  - Summer (DST): UTC−5 (CDT)
- Congressional districts: 13th, 15th
- Website: www.madisoncountyil.gov

Madison County is located in the U.S. state of Illinois. It is a part of the Metro East in Southern Illinois. According to the 2020 census, it had a population of 264,776, making it the eighth-most populous county in Illinois and the most populous in the southern portion of the state. The county seat is Edwardsville, and the largest city is Granite City.

Madison County is part of the Metro East region of Greater St. Louis. The pre-Columbian city of Cahokia Mounds, a World Heritage Site, was located near Collinsville. Edwardsville is home to Southern Illinois University Edwardsville. To the north, Alton is known for its abolitionist and American Civil War-era history. It is also the home of the Southern Illinois University School of Dental Medicine. Godfrey, the village named for Captain Benjamin Godfrey, offers Lewis and Clark Community College formerly the Monticello Female Seminary.

== History ==
Madison County was established in the Illinois Territory on September 14, 1812. It was formed from parts of Randolph and St. Clair counties and named for President James Madison. At the time of its formation, Madison County included all of the modern State of Illinois north of St. Louis, as well as all of Wisconsin, part of Minnesota, and Michigan's Upper Peninsula.

In the late 19th century, Madison County became an industrial region, and in the 20th century was known first for Graniteware, and later for its steel mills, oil refineries, and other heavy industries. The county had a large working population, and the county and surrounding area was a center of strength for the Democratic Party.

Industrial restructuring cost many jobs and reduced the population. The county now is part of the eastern St. Louis metropolitan area (nicknamed "Metro East"), as is neighboring St. Clair County.

In 2009, the EPA issued an air pollution report that ranked Madison County as the county with the second-highest cancer risk in the country due to air pollution, second only to Los Angeles County, California.

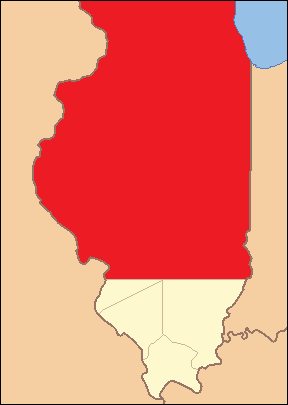
Madison County between its creation in 1812 and 1815, extending north to Lake Superior and the border with Rupert's Land

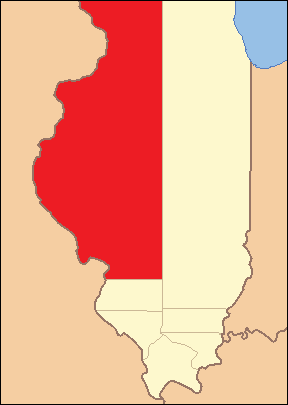
Madison County between 1815 and 1817

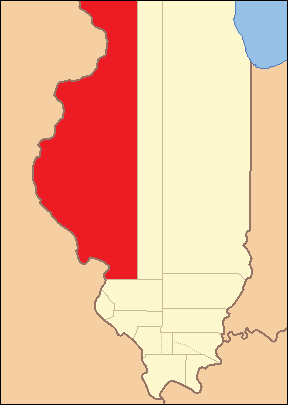
Madison County between 1817 and 1821

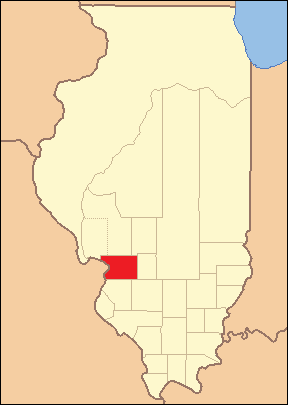
Madison County between 1821 and 1825

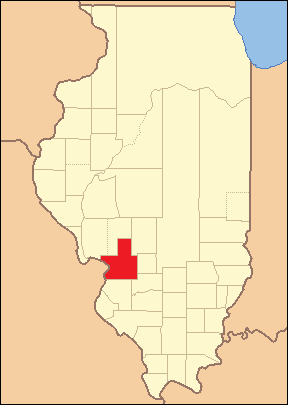
Between 1825 and 1829, Madison included a northern salient that was split off to form part of Macoupin County.

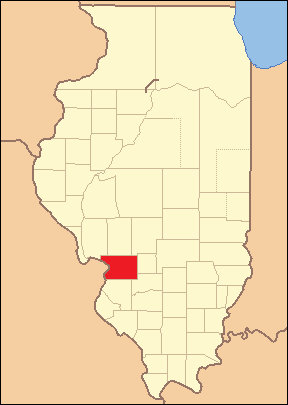
In 1829, Madison returned to its 1821 borders.

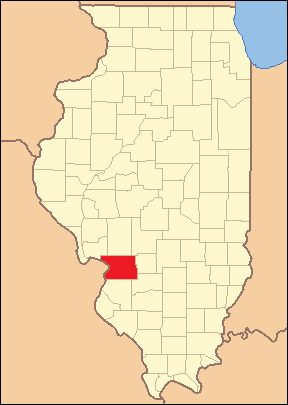
In 1843, a small amount of land was transferred to Bond County, reducing Madison to its current size.

== Geography ==
According to the U.S. Census Bureau, the county has a total area of 741 square miles (1,920 km^{2}), of which 716 square miles (1,850 km^{2}) is land and 25 square miles (65 km^{2}) (3.4%) is water. Madison County is on the Mississippi River, while the other major body of water is Horseshoe Lake.

=== Climate and weather ===
Edwardsville, Illinois

Climate chart (precipitation, max. and min. temperature)
J	F	M	A	M	J	J	A	S	O	N	D
2 36 19	2.3 42 24	3.5 52 34	4.2 64 45	4.2 75 55	3.2 84 64	3.5 90 70	3.2 86 66	3.1 79 58	2.7 68 46	3.8 53 35	2.9 41 25
- █ Average max. and min. temperatures in °F
- █ Precipitation totals in inches
- Source: The Weather Channel
Metric conversion
J	F	M	A	M	J	J	A	S	O	N	D
51 2 −7	58 6 −4	88 11 1	106 18 7	108 24 13	82 29 18	89 32 21	81 30 19	80 26 14	69 20 8	95 12 2	74 5 −4
- █ Average max. and min. temperatures in °C
- █ Precipitation totals in mm

In recent years, average temperatures in the county seat of Edwardsville have ranged from a low of 19 °F (−7 °C) in January to a high of 90 °F (32 °C) in July, although a record low of −27 °F (−33 °C) was recorded in January 1977 and a record high of 114 °F (46 °C) was recorded in July 2012. Average monthly precipitation ranged from 1.99 inches (51 mm) in January to 4.24 inches (108 mm) in May. Climate Zone 4A per the International Energy Conservation Code.

=== Adjacent counties and city ===
- Bond County - east
- Clinton County - southeast
- Jersey County - northwest
- Macoupin County - north
- Montgomery County - northeast
- St. Charles County, Missouri - northwest
- St. Clair County - south
- St. Louis, Missouri - west
- St. Louis County, Missouri - west

=== Parks and Reserves ===
- Chouteau Island
- Gabaret Island
- Horseshoe Lake State Park
- Mosenthein Island
- Cahokia Mounds State Park

== Transportation ==
Madison County Transit serves the county with 25 bus routes and 85 miles (137 km) of bike trails. Intercity rail service is provided by Amtrak at Alton station. Trains on the Lincoln Service route travel between Chicago and St. Louis.

=== Major highways ===
- I-55
- I-70
- I-255
- I-270
- US 40
- US 67
- IL 3
- IL 4
- IL 100
- IL 111
- IL 140
- IL 143
- IL 157
- IL 159
- IL 160
- IL 162
- IL 203
- IL 255
- IL 267

== Demographics ==
Historical population
Census	Pop.	Note	%±
1820	13,550		—
1830	6,221		−54.1%
1840	14,433		132.0%
1850	20,441		41.6%
1860	31,251		52.9%
1870	44,131		41.2%
1880	50,126		13.6%
1890	51,535		2.8%
1900	64,694		25.5%
1910	89,847		38.9%
1920	106,895		19.0%
1930	143,830		34.6%
1940	149,349		3.8%
1950	182,307		22.1%
1960	224,689		23.2%
1970	250,934		11.7%
1980	247,691		−1.3%
1990	249,238		0.6%
2000	258,941		3.9%
2010	269,282		4.0%
2020	265,859		−1.3%
2025 (est.)	263,110	▼	−1.0%
U.S. Decennial Census; 1790-1960 1900-1990; 1990-2000 2010-2019

=== 2020 census ===
Madison County, Illinois – Racial and ethnic composition Note: the US Census treats Hispanic/Latino as an ethnic category. This table excludes Latinos from the racial categories and assigns them to a separate category. Hispanics/Latinos may be of any race.
Race / Ethnicity (NH = Non-Hispanic)	Pop 1980	Pop 1990	Pop 2000	Pop 2010	Pop 2020	% 1980	% 1990	% 2000	% 2010	% 2020
White alone (NH)	229,372	228,315	231,313	233,515	213,793	92.60%	91.61%	89.33%	86.72%	80.42%
Black or African American alone (NH)	14,162	16,074	18,825	21,066	24,671	5.72%	6.45%	7.27%	7.82%	9.28%
Native American or Alaska Native alone (NH)	425	656	626	556	559	0.17%	0.26%	0.24%	0.21%	0.21%
Asian alone (NH)	740	1,364	1,515	2,211	2,718	0.30%	0.55%	0.59%	0.82%	1.02%
Native Hawaiian or Pacific Islander alone (NH)	x	x	50	92	92	x	x	0.02%	0.03%	0.03%
Other race alone (NH)	497	116	237	206	825	0.20%	0.05%	0.09%	0.08%	0.31%
Mixed race or Multiracial (NH)	x	x	2,450	4,323	12,404	x	x	0.95%	1.61%	4.67%
Hispanic or Latino (any race)	2,495	2,713	3,925	7,313	10,797	1.01%	1.09%	1.52%	2.72%	4.06%
Total	247,691	249,238	258,941	269,282	265,859	100.00%	100.00%	100.00%	100.00%	100.00%

As of the 2020 census, the county had a population of 265,859. The median age was 40.3 years. 21.3% of residents were under the age of 18 and 18.1% of residents were 65 years of age or older. For every 100 females there were 95.2 males, and for every 100 females age 18 and over there were 92.7 males age 18 and over.

The racial makeup of the county was 81.4% White, 9.4% Black or African American, 0.3% American Indian and Alaska Native, 1.0% Asian, <0.1% Native Hawaiian and Pacific Islander, 1.5% from some other race, and 6.3% from two or more races. Hispanic or Latino residents of any race comprised 4.1% of the population, while non-Hispanic White residents comprised 80.4% of the population.

83.6% of residents lived in urban areas, while 16.4% lived in rural areas.

There were 108,607 households in the county, of which 28.4% had children under the age of 18 living in them. Of all households, 46.1% were married-couple households, 18.6% were households with a male householder and no spouse or partner present, and 27.9% were households with a female householder and no spouse or partner present. About 29.5% of all households were made up of individuals and 12.8% had someone living alone who was 65 years of age or older.

There were 118,579 housing units, of which 8.4% were vacant. Among occupied housing units, 71.3% were owner-occupied and 28.7% were renter-occupied. The homeowner vacancy rate was 2.1% and the rental vacancy rate was 9.2%.

=== 2010 census ===
As of the 2010 census, there were 269,282 people, 108,094 households, and 71,756 families residing in the county. The population density was 376.3 inhabitants per square mile (145.3/km^{2}). There were 117,106 housing units at an average density of 163.7 per square mile (63.2/km^{2}). The racial makeup of the county was 88.2% white, 7.9% black or African American, 0.8% Asian, 0.2% American Indian, 0.9% from other races, and 1.8% from two or more races. Those of Hispanic or Latino origin made up 2.7% of the population. In terms of ancestry, 32.7% were German, 14.9% were Irish, 10.5% were English, 7.5% were American, and 5.7% were Italian.

Of the 108,094 households, 31.4% had children under the age of 18 living with them, 49.3% were married couples living together, 12.2% had a female householder with no husband present, 33.6% were non-families, and 26.8% of all households were made up of individuals. The average household size was 2.46 and the average family size was 2.98. The median age was 38.6 years.

The median income for a household in the county was $51,941 and the median income for a family was $64,630. Males had a median income of $50,355 versus $35,543 for females. The per capita income for the county was $26,127. About 9.1% of families and 12.9% of the population were below the poverty line, including 19.3% of those under age 18 and 6.6% of those age 65 or over.

== Communities ==
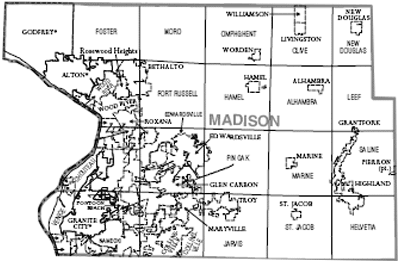
Map of Madison County, Illinois

=== Cities ===
- Alton
- Collinsville (partly in St. Clair County)
- Edwardsville
- Granite City
- Highland
- Madison
- Troy
- Venice
- Wood River

=== Villages ===
- Alhambra
- Bethalto
- East Alton
- Fairmont City
- Glen Carbon
- Godfrey
- Grantfork
- Hamel
- Hartford
- Livingston
- Marine
- Maryville
- New Douglas
- Pontoon Beach
- Pierron
- Roxana
- South Roxana
- St. Jacob
- Williamson
- Worden

=== Census Designated Places ===
- Holiday Shores
- Mitchell
- Moro
- Prairietown
- Rosewood Heights

=== Other unincorporated and historic communities ===
- Binney
- Cottage Hills
- Donkville
- Dorsey
- Fosterburg
- Goshen Settlement
- Kaufman
- Kuhn Station
- LeClaire
- Lincoln Place
- Lumaghi Heights
- Meadowbrook
- Midway
- Newport
- Poag
- St. Morgan
- State Park Place
- Upper Alton
- Wanda

=== Townships ===
Madison County is divided into twenty-four townships:

- Alhambra
- Alton
- Chouteau
- Collinsville
- Edwardsville
- Fort Russell
- Foster
- Godfrey
- Granite City
- Hamel
- Helvetia
- Jarvis
- Leef
- Marine
- Moro
- Nameoki
- New Douglas
- Olive
- Omphghent
- Pin Oak
- Saline
- St. Jacob
- Venice
- Wood River

=== Islands ===
- Chouteau Island
- Gabaret Island
- Mosenthein Island

=== Historic Settlements ===
- Camp Dubois

=== Population ranking ===
The population ranking of the following table is based on the 2020 census of Madison County.

† county seat

Rank	Place	Municipal type	Population (2020 Census)
1	Granite City	City	27,549
2	† Edwardsville	City	26,808
3	Alton	City	25,676
4	Collinsville (partially in St. Clair County)	City	24,366
5	Godfrey	Village	17,825
6	Glen Carbon	Village	13,842
7	Troy	City	10,960
8	Wood River	Village	10,464
9	Highland	City	9,991
10	Bethalto	Village	9,310
11	Maryville	Village	8,221
12	Pontoon Beach	Village	5,876
13	East Alton	Village	5,786
14	Rosewood Heights	CDP	3,971
15	Madison (partially in St. Clair County)	City	3,171
16	Holiday Shores	CDP	2,840
17	Fairmont City (partially in St. Clair County)	City	2,265
18	South Roxana	Village	1,891
19	Venice	City	1,498
20	Roxana	Village	1,454
21	St. Jacob	Village	1,358
22	Mitchell	CDP	1,217
23	Hartford	Village	1,185
24	Worden	Village	1,096
25	Hamel	Village	929
26	Marine	Village	912
27	Livingston	Village	763
28	Alhambra	Village	622
29	Pierron	Village	459
30	Moro	CDP	397
31	New Douglas	Village	350
32	Grantfork	Village	341
33	Williamson	Village	183

== Politics ==
Like much of southern Illinois, Madison County was a predominantly Democratic area for much of its history, but in recent elections has been moving toward Republicans. Mitt Romney narrowly carried the county in the 2012 presidential election, becoming the first Republican presidential nominee to do so since 1984. In 2016, Donald Trump carried the largest share of the vote for any Republican presidential candidate since 1972. The county also supported the Republican candidates for governor in 2010, 2014, 2018, and 2022.

As of February 2025, the county is one of 7 that voted to join the state of Indiana.

United States presidential election results for Madison County, Illinois
Year	Republican		Democratic		Third party(ies)	
Year	No.	%	No.	%	No.	%
1892	5,355	45.89%	5,680	48.68%	634	5.43%
1896	7,431	53.26%	6,344	45.47%	177	1.27%
1900	8,106	53.36%	6,753	44.46%	331	2.18%
1904	9,009	57.12%	5,429	34.42%	1,333	8.45%
1908	9,463	51.14%	7,812	42.22%	1,228	6.64%
1912	5,462	30.57%	7,155	40.04%	5,251	29.39%
1916	17,594	49.82%	16,302	46.16%	1,421	4.02%
1920	19,249	57.82%	10,149	30.48%	3,894	11.70%
1924	19,926	47.61%	12,863	30.74%	9,062	21.65%
1928	28,028	53.48%	23,658	45.14%	720	1.37%
1932	19,774	34.55%	35,211	61.52%	2,253	3.94%
1936	22,073	33.60%	42,172	64.20%	1,441	2.19%
1940	30,445	40.10%	44,803	59.01%	681	0.90%
1944	28,399	41.23%	40,114	58.24%	359	0.52%
1948	25,059	37.79%	40,897	61.68%	350	0.53%
1952	36,206	41.60%	50,734	58.29%	99	0.11%
1956	39,413	45.10%	47,897	54.80%	88	0.10%
1960	42,984	43.90%	54,787	55.96%	133	0.14%
1964	30,009	31.55%	65,115	68.45%	0	0.00%
1968	39,622	39.18%	46,384	45.87%	15,123	14.95%
1972	55,385	55.88%	43,289	43.68%	442	0.45%
1976	44,183	43.32%	56,457	55.35%	1,358	1.33%
1980	51,160	51.10%	43,860	43.81%	5,104	5.10%
1984	57,021	53.94%	48,352	45.74%	340	0.32%
1988	44,907	45.04%	54,175	54.34%	613	0.61%
1992	32,167	28.19%	58,484	51.26%	23,444	20.55%
1996	35,758	35.55%	53,568	53.26%	11,247	11.18%
2000	48,821	43.94%	59,077	53.17%	3,206	2.89%
2004	59,384	48.02%	63,399	51.26%	895	0.72%
2008	57,177	44.43%	68,979	53.60%	2,534	1.97%
2012	60,608	49.32%	58,922	47.95%	3,355	2.73%
2016	70,490	54.15%	50,587	38.86%	9,102	6.99%
2020	76,031	55.27%	57,836	42.04%	3,691	2.68%
2024	73,925	55.34%	56,341	42.18%	3,317	2.48%

== Education ==
K-12 school districts include:

- Alton Community Unit School District 11
- Bethalto Consolidated Unit School District 8
- Bunker Hill Community Unit School District 8
- Collinsville Community Unit School District 10
- Edwardsville Community Unit School District 7
- Granite City Community Unit School District 9
- Highland Community Unit School District 5
- Madison Community Unit School District 12
- Roxana Community Unit School District 1
- Triad Community Unit School District 2
- Staunton Community Unit School District 6
- Venice Community Unit School District 3

Secondary school districts include:

- Central Community High School District 71
- East Alton-Wood River Community High School District 14

Elementary school districts include:

- Aviston School District 21
- East Alton School District 13
- St. Rose School District 14-15
- Wood River-Hartford Elementary School District 15

Colleges and universities include:

- Southern Illinois University Edwardsville
- Southern Illinois University School of Dental Medicine

== See also ==
- National Register of Historic Places listings in Madison County, Illinois
- The Invincible Thieves
