= Howard Rambsy II =

Howard Rambsy II is a professor of literature at Southern Illinois University Edwardsville, and teaches American Literature and African American Literature. He is known for writing The Black Arts Enterprise and Bad Men: Creative Touchstones of Black Writers. He was written articles, created blogs, and hosted created projects related to literary history, technology, poetry, and race studies. At the university, he hosted 200 public humanities projects, including podcasts, exhibits, reading groups, online/web-based projects on African American fiction and poetry. He started a podcast with the students called Remarkable Receptions, which focused on African American artistic and literary productions.
