= Dorsey, Illinois =

- Unincorporated community
- Location within Illinois Location within the United States
- Coordinates: 38°58′25″N 90°00′05″W
- Country: United States
- State: Illinois
- County: Madison
- Elevation: 587 ft (179 m)
- Time zone: UTC-6 (Central (CST))
  - Summer (DST): UTC-5 (CDT)
- ZIP code: 62021
- Area code: 618
- GNIS feature ID: 422634

Dorsey is an unincorporated community in Madison County, Illinois, United States. Dorsey is located in Moro Township, 6 miles (9.7 km) north-northeast of Bethalto. Dorsey has a post office with ZIP code 62021.

== History ==
A post office has been in operation at Dorsey since 1857. The community bears the name of Samuel L. Dorsey, a local pioneer.
