= Moro, Illinois =

- Census-designated place
- Location within Illinois Location within the United States
- Coordinates: 38°55′31″N 90°01′35″W
- Country: United States
- State: Illinois
- County: Madison
- Townships: Moro, Fort Russell

Area
  - Total: 0.223 sq mi (0.58 km^{2})
  - Land: 0.219 sq mi (0.57 km^{2})
  - Water: 0.004 sq mi (0.010 km^{2})
- Elevation: 528 ft (161 m)

Population (2020)
  - Total: 397
  - Density: 1,812.8/sq mi (699.9/km^{2})
- Time zone: UTC-6 (Central (CST))
  - Summer (DST): UTC-5 (CDT)
- ZIP code: 62067
- Area code: 618
- GNIS feature ID: 2804653

Moro is an unincorporated community and census-designated place (CDP) in Madison County, Illinois, United States. As of the 2020 census it had a population of 397. Moro, like all of Madison County, is part of the Illinois Metro-East region of the Greater St. Louis metropolitan area.

The city of Moro, Oregon, is named for the Illinois community.

== History ==
The railroad was built through Moro in 1853, contributing to the community's growth. James H. Smith and James Montgomery platted the town on March 7, 1855. The plat was revised on August 23, 1855, when the community was named Moro.

== Geography ==
Moro is located in northwestern Madison County and sits at the northeast edge of the urban portion of the Metro-East area. It is bordered to the southwest by the village of Bethalto, while unincorporated Meadowbrook is 2 miles (3 km) to the southeast. Downtown St. Louis is 26 miles (42 km) to the southwest. Moro has a post office with ZIP code 62067.

According to the U.S. Census Bureau, the Moro CDP has a total area of 0.22 square miles (0.57 km^{2}), of which 0.004 square miles (0.010 km^{2}), or 1.79%, are water. The community drains west to Rocky Branch, a tributary of the East Fork of the Wood River, running to the Mississippi River at East Alton.

== Demographics ==
Moro first appeared as a census designated place in the 2020 U.S. census.

== Education ==
It is in the Edwardsville Community Unit School District 7.

== Notable people ==
- Alida Bowler (1887–1968), social worker and educator
