= St. Jacob Township, Madison County, Illinois =

St. Jacob Township
- Township

- Location of Illinois in the United States
- Coordinates: 38°41′48″N 89°46′04″W
- Country: United States
- State: Illinois
- County: Madison
- Settled: November 2, 1875

Area
  - Total: 35.95 sq mi (93.1 km^{2})
  - Land: 35.6 sq mi (92 km^{2})
  - Water: 0.35 sq mi (0.91 km^{2})
- Elevation: 512 ft (156 m)

Population (2010)
  - Estimate (2016): 2,684
  - Density: 72.4/sq mi (28.0/km^{2})
- Time zone: UTC-6 (CST)
  - Summer (DST): UTC-5 (CDT)
- FIPS code: 17-119-66872

St. Jacob Township is located in Madison County, Illinois, in the United States. As of the 2010 census, its population was 2,578 and it contained 981 housing units.

== Geography ==
According to the 2010 census, the township has a total area of 35.95 square miles (93.1 km^{2}), of which 35.6 square miles (92 km^{2}) (or 99.03%) is land and 0.35 square miles (0.91 km^{2}) (or 0.97%) is water.

== Demographics ==
Historical population
Census	Pop.	Note	%±
2016 (est.)	2,684
U.S. Decennial Census
