= Royal Lakes, Illinois =

- Village
- Location in Macoupin County, Illinois
- Coordinates: 39°06′42″N 89°57′38″W
- Country: United States
- State: Illinois
- County: Macoupin
- Township: Hillyard

Area
  - Total: 0.51 sq mi (1.33 km^{2})
  - Land: 0.47 sq mi (1.21 km^{2})
  - Water: 0.046 sq mi (0.12 km^{2})
- Elevation: 640 ft (200 m)

Population (2020)
  - Total: 167
  - Density: 358.7/sq mi (138.49/km^{2})
- Time zone: UTC-6 (CST)
  - Summer (DST): UTC-5 (CDT)
- ZIP code: 62685
- Area code: 618
- FIPS code: 17-66196
- GNIS feature ID: 2399138

Royal Lakes is a village in Macoupin County, Illinois, United States. The population was 167 at the 2020 census, down from 197 in 2010.

== History ==
The site that would eventually become Royal Lakes was purchased by a Chicago developer in 1956. The 320-acre (1.3 km^{2}) tract was to be developed as a resort-style community. Three small lakes – Meshach, Shad, and Shadrach – were constructed for recreational purposes and the remaining land was divided into 2,435 lots, each measuring 25 by 125 feet (7.6 by 38.1 m). Royal Lakes was marketed as an affordable resort location in a rural setting. The community was heavily promoted in the predominantly African American neighborhoods of St. Louis and East St. Louis. In 1957, the first families moved into Royal Lakes. A community church was organized in 1961, and the congregation moved into a permanent building seven years later.

Due to Royal Lakes' status as a "resort" area, a lack of zoning regulations meant that there had been no provisions for the developer to provide basic infrastructure. With no road maintenance, water supply, or proper sewage disposal, the overall quality of life for residents of the community deteriorated. By the early 1970s, residents agreed that the only way to improve conditions in the community was through incorporation. An incorporation election was held in October 1972. Of the 98 votes cast, 89 were in favor of incorporation and 9 opposed. Royal Lakes officially became the Village of Royal Lakes.

The village's first mayor, Thomas J. Stoddard, and other members of the municipal government took office in April 1973.

== Geography ==
Royal Lakes is located at in Hillyard Township in southern Macoupin County. Royal Lakes lies at the southwestern corner of two intersecting roads, Illinois Route 16 and Illinois Route 159. The nearest large cities are St. Louis, approximately 45 miles (72 km) to the southwest, and Springfield, around 60 miles (97 km) northeast of the village.

According to the 2021 census gazetteer files, Royal Lakes has a total area of 0.51 square miles (1.32 km^{2}), of which 0.47 square miles (1.22 km^{2}) (or 91.02%) is land and 0.05 square miles (0.13 km^{2}) (or 8.98%) is water.

=== Lakes ===
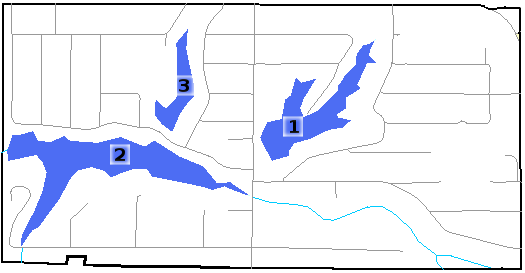
Map of the three lakes in Royal Lakes, Illinois 1 – Meshach Lake 2 – Shad Lake 3 – Shadrach Lake

Three small lakes – Meshach, Shad, and Shadrach – are located within the village of Royal Lakes.

- Meshach Lake is located in the east central portion of Royal Lakes. With an average depth of between 9 and 12 feet (2.7 and 3.7 m), it is the deepest of the three lakes.
- Shad Lake covers approximately 1.5 acres (6,100 m^{2}) with a maximum depth of 2 feet (0.61 m).
- Shadrach Lake is located north of Magnolia Drive and west of North Dogwood Drive. Its depth ranges from 5 to 8 feet (1.5 to 2.4 m).

Shad Lake is an impoundment on Coop Branch, a northwest-flowing tributary of Macoupin Creek, while Meshach and Shadrach Lakes are built on separate tributaries of Coop Branch. The entire community is within the Illinois River watershed.

== Demographics ==
Historical population
| Census | Pop. | Note | %± |
|---|---|---|---|
| 1980 | 270 | | — |
| 1990 | 272 | | 0.7% |
| 2000 | 190 | | −30.1% |
| 2010 | 197 | | 3.7% |
| 2020 | 167 | | −15.2% |
U.S. Decennial Census

As of the 2020 census there were 167 people, 126 households, and 56 families residing in the village. The population density was 326.17 inhabitants per square mile (125.93/km^{2}). There were 103 housing units at an average density of 201.17 per square mile (77.67/km^{2}). The racial makeup of the village was 40.72% White, 50.90% African American, 1.80% Native American, 0.00% Asian, 0.00% Pacific Islander, 0.00% from other races, and 6.59% from two or more races. Hispanic or Latino of any race were 0.60% of the population.

There were 126 households, out of which 11.9% had children under the age of 18 living with them, 31.75% were married couples living together, 3.17% had a female householder with no husband present, and 55.56% were non-families. 52.38% of all households were made up of individuals, and 9.52% had someone living alone who was 65 years of age or older. The average household size was 3.64 and the average family size was 2.24.

The village's age distribution consisted of 13.8% under the age of 18, 15.2% from 18 to 24, 2.5% from 25 to 44, 47.9% from 45 to 64, and 20.6% who were 65 years of age or older. The median age was 56.7 years. For every 100 females, there were 78.5 males. For every 100 females age 18 and over, there were 82.7 males.

The median income for a household in the village was $19,773, and the median income for a family was $48,000. Males had a median income of $19,464 versus $16,250 for females. The per capita income for the village was $14,263. About 14.3% of families and 26.2% of the population were below the poverty line, including 5.1% of those under age 18 and 20.7% of those age 65 or over.

Royal Lakes village, Illinois – Racial and ethnic composition Note: the US Census treats Hispanic/Latino as an ethnic category. This table excludes Latinos from the racial categories and assigns them to a separate category. Hispanics/Latinos may be of any race.
| Race / Ethnicity (NH = Non-Hispanic) | Pop 2000 | Pop 2010 | Pop 2020 | % 2000 | % 2010 | % 2020 |
|---|---|---|---|---|---|---|
| White alone (NH) | 30 | 62 | 68 | 15.79% | 31.47% | 40.72% |
| Black or African American alone (NH) | 153 | 127 | 85 | 80.53% | 64.47% | 50.90% |
| Native American or Alaska Native alone (NH) | 1 | 1 | 3 | 0.53% | 0.51% | 1.80% |
| Asian alone (NH) | 0 | 1 | 0 | 0.00% | 0.51% | 0.00% |
| Native Hawaiian or Pacific Islander alone (NH) | 0 | 0 | 0 | 0.00% | 0.00% | 0.00% |
| Other race alone (NH) | 0 | 0 | 0 | 0.00% | 0.00% | 0.00% |
| Mixed race or Multiracial (NH) | 4 | 1 | 10 | 2.11% | 0.51% | 5.99% |
| Hispanic or Latino (any race) | 2 | 5 | 1 | 1.05% | 2.54% | 0.60% |
| Total | 190 | 197 | 167 | 100.00% | 100.00% | 100.00% |

== Education ==
Public education in the village of Royal Lakes is provided by two school districts. The portion of Royal Lakes lying east of Julian Avenue is served by Bunker Hill Community Unit School District 8. Areas west of Julian Avenue are served by Southwestern Community Unit School District 9.
