= Worden, Illinois =

- Village
- Location in Madison County, Illinois
- Coordinates: 38°55′54″N 89°50′25″W
- Country: United States
- State: Illinois
- County: Madison
- Township: Omphghent

Area
  - Total: 0.73 sq mi (1.88 km^{2})
  - Land: 0.71 sq mi (1.85 km^{2})
  - Water: 0.012 sq mi (0.03 km^{2})
- Elevation: 571 ft (174 m)

Population (2020)
  - Total: 1,096
  - Density: 1,536.5/sq mi (593.26/km^{2})
- Time zone: UTC-6 (CST)
  - Summer (DST): UTC-5 (CDT)
- ZIP code: 62097
- Area code: 618
- FIPS code: 17-83505
- GNIS feature ID: 2399741

Worden is a village in Madison County, Illinois, United States. The population was 1,096 at the 2020 census.

== History ==
Worden was originally called "New Hampton", and under the latter name was laid out in 1860. When the railroad was built through the settlement in 1870, the name "Worden" was given to the station, after John C. Worden, an English immigrant, businessman, and railroad promoter.

== Geography ==
Worden is located in northern Madison County. It is 3 miles (5 km) north of Hamel, 20 miles (32 km) east of Alton, and 35 miles (56 km) northeast of St. Louis.

According to the U.S. Census Bureau, Worden has a total area of 0.72 square miles (1.86 km^{2}), of which 0.01 square miles (0.03 km^{2}), or 1.66%, are water. The village drains west to tributaries of Cahokia Creek, a west-flowing direct tributary of the Mississippi River.

== Demographics ==
Historical population
Census	Pop.	Note	%±
1880	384		—
1890	522		35.9%
1900	544		4.2%
1910	1,082		98.9%
1920	1,252		15.7%
1930	1,111		−11.3%
1940	1,264		13.8%
1950	968		−23.4%
1960	1,060		9.5%
1970	1,091		2.9%
1980	953		−12.6%
1990	896		−6.0%
2000	905		1.0%
2010	1,044		15.4%
2020	1,096		5.0%
U.S. Decennial Census

=== 2020 census ===
As of the 2020 census, Worden had a population of 1,096. The median age was 38.1 years. 26.6% of residents were under the age of 18 and 14.5% of residents were 65 years of age or older. For every 100 females there were 101.8 males, and for every 100 females age 18 and over there were 103.0 males age 18 and over.

0.0% of residents lived in urban areas, while 100.0% lived in rural areas.

There were 432 households in Worden, of which 32.6% had children under the age of 18 living in them. Of all households, 51.2% were married-couple households, 19.9% were households with a male householder and no spouse or partner present, and 22.2% were households with a female householder and no spouse or partner present. About 30.1% of all households were made up of individuals and 11.6% had someone living alone who was 65 years of age or older.

There were 478 housing units, of which 9.6% were vacant. The homeowner vacancy rate was 2.2% and the rental vacancy rate was 12.6%.

Racial composition as of the 2020 census
Race	Number	Percent
White	1,042	95.1%
Black or African American	1	0.1%
American Indian and Alaska Native	0	0.0%
Asian	4	0.4%
Native Hawaiian and Other Pacific Islander	0	0.0%
Some other race	7	0.6%
Two or more races	42	3.8%
Hispanic or Latino (of any race)	26	2.4%

=== 2000 census ===
At the 2000 census there were 905 people, 378 households, and 261 families living in the village. The population density was 1,370.3 inhabitants per square mile (529.1/km^{2}). There were 396 housing units at an average density of 599.6 per square mile (231.5/km^{2}). The racial makeup of the village was 99.34% White, 0.44% Native American, 0.11% from other races, and 0.11% from two or more races. Hispanic or Latino of any race were 1.22%.

Of the 378 households 32.5% had children under the age of 18 living with them, 55.6% were married couples living together, 11.6% had a female householder with no husband present, and 30.7% were non-families. 27.0% of households were one person and 13.5% were one person aged 65 or older. The average household size was 2.39 and the average family size was 2.90.

The age distribution was 24.3% under the age of 18, 7.7% from 18 to 24, 30.6% from 25 to 44, 23.4% from 45 to 64, and 13.9% 65 or older. The median age was 36 years. For every 100 females, there were 90.1 males. For every 100 females age 18 and over, there were 88.2 males.

The median household income was $36,100 and the median family income was $40,909. Males had a median income of $35,294 versus $20,156 for females. The per capita income for the village was $18,485. About 13.1% of families and 12.0% of the population were below the poverty line, including 19.4% of those under age 18 and 3.9% of those age 65 or over.

== Education ==
It is in the Edwardsville Community Unit School District 7.

== Notable people ==
- Evelyn M. Bowles, Illinois state senator; born in Worden
- Karen May, Illinois state senator; born in Worden.
