= Moro Township, Madison County, Illinois =

Moro Township
- Township

- Location of Illinois in the United States
- Coordinates: 38°57′35″N 89°58′52″W
- Country: United States
- State: Illinois
- County: Madison
- Settled: November 2, 1875

Area
  - Total: 32.54 sq mi (84.3 km^{2})
  - Land: 31.84 sq mi (82.5 km^{2})
  - Water: 0.7 sq mi (1.8 km^{2})
- Elevation: 564 ft (172 m)

Population (2010)
  - Estimate (2016): 3,521
  - Density: 111.5/sq mi (43.1/km^{2})
- Time zone: UTC-6 (CST)
  - Summer (DST): UTC-5 (CDT)
- FIPS code: 17-119-50465

Moro Township is located in Madison County, Illinois, in the United States. As of the 2010 census, its population was 3,551 and it contained 1,491 housing units. It contains part of the census-designated places of Holiday Shores and Moro.

== Geography ==
According to the 2010 census, the township has a total area of 32.54 square miles (84.3 km^{2}), of which 31.84 square miles (82.5 km^{2}) (or 97.85%) is land and 0.7 square miles (1.8 km^{2}) (or 2.15%) is water.

== Demographics ==
Historical population
Census	Pop.	Note	%±
2016 (est.)	3,521
U.S. Decennial Census
