= Busey Bank =

American financial institution

First Busey Corporation
- Formerly: Champaign County Bank & Trust Company
- Type: Public
- Traded as: Nasdaq: BUSE; Russell 2000 Component
- Industry: Financial services
- Founded: 1868; 158 years ago
- Headquarters: Champaign, Illinois, US
- Number of locations: 80; and more than 37,000 ATMs
- Area served: United States
- Key people: Van A. Dukeman (president, chairman & CEO)
- Services: Banking; Investment; Wealth management
- Number of employees: approx. 1500
- Subsidiaries: Busey Bank; Busey Wealth Management; FirsTech, Inc.
- Website: busey.com

First Busey Bank is a financial institution headquartered in Champaign, Illinois that operates in 10 states. It is owned by First Busey Holding, a financial holding company.

The bank provides a range of banking services, including real estate loans and retail banking services. The bank also provides automated banking and fund transfer capabilities.

== History ==
=== Foundation and early years ===
In 1868, Samuel Busey and two co-founders established the Busey Brothers and Company Bank in Urbana, Illinois. On its first day, the bank collected $9,555.60 in deposits. In 1913, the bank obtained its state charter and became known as Busey State Bank.

In 1922, the Shelby Loan & Trust Company in Shelbyville, Illinois was granted trust powers, while the Pulaski Building and Loan Association was established in St. Louis to assist the community with savings and home purchases. Additionally, Farm Management Services was created in 1926. In 1935, Busey State Bank joined the Federal Deposit Insurance Corporation (FDIC).

On September 1, 1945, the bank obtained its federal charter, and a day before the end of World War II, it became known as Busey First National Bank.

=== 1960s–1990s ===
On the 100th anniversary of Busey First National Bank in 1968, its assets exceeded $34 million. In 1971, Busey First National Bank underwent a change in ownership, marking the first time it was controlled by a non-Busey family member.

In 1980, Busey First National Bank established First Busey Corporation as a bank holding company. The merger of Busey First National Bank, Champaign County Bank & Trust, and City Bank in 1987 formed Busey Bank, a state-chartered bank.

BankIllinois, formerly known as Trevett-Mattis, merged with Champaign National Bank in 1995 and retains the name BankIllinois. The first Busey Corporation stock began trading on NASDAQ under the symbol BUSE in 1998. In 1999, Busey acquired Eagle Bank Group.

=== 2000–2008 ===
In 2000, the merger of BankIllinois Financial Corporation and First Decatur Bancshares, Inc. led to the formation of Main Street Trust, Inc. Fort Myers, Florida, became the headquarters for Busey Bank Florida in 2001. BankIllinois and The First National Bank of Decatur merge and adopt the name Main Street Bank & Trust. In 2005, Main Street Bank & Trust acquired Citizens First Financial Corporation. Tarpon Coast Bancorp, Inc. was acquired. The announcement is made on July 29, 2005, and the transaction is completed on February 17, 2006.

The merger between First Busey and Main Street Bank and Trust, based in Decatur, Illinois, was finalized on July 31, 2007. Van A. Dukeman assumes the role of president and chief executive officer, and a new Busey brand is introduced.

=== 2009 bailout ===
In March 2009, Busey received $100 million from the U.S. Treasury through the Troubled Asset Relief Program (TARP) in exchange for Busey stock. Busey subsequently paid $12.4 million in dividends on the stock. In August 2011, Busey returned $27.4 million to the Treasury and transferred the remaining $72.6 million from the TARP program to the Treasury's Small Business Lending Fund (SBLF). The SBLF has fewer restrictions and may require smaller dividends.

The practice of exchanging TARP funds for SBLF funds has faced criticism from the TARP Inspector General and members of Congress. They argue that banks can use this approach to remove the restrictions imposed by TARP while potentially reducing their small business lending.

=== 2010–present ===
First Busey Corporation merged with its subsidiary, Busey Bank, N.A., headquartered in Fort Myers, Florida, becoming Busey Bank. The Busey family founded Trevett Capital Partners.

Busey acquired Herget Financial Corp., the holding company for Herget Bank. The acquisition was announced on September 26, 2014, and completed on March 16, 2015.

In 2016, Busey merged with St. Louis's Pulaski Financial, a bank founded in 1922 with more than $1.5 billion in assets at the time of the merger.

In 2025, Busey acquired Leawood, Kansas-based CrossFirst Bankshares, increasing their assets to $20 billion, deposits of $17 billion and loans of $15 billion. The holding company is headquartered in suburban Kansas City. Busey Bank's headquarters remains in Champaign, Illinois.

== Subsidiaries ==
- Busey Bank
- Busey Wealth Management
- FirsTech, Inc.
