= Monica Bristow =

American politician

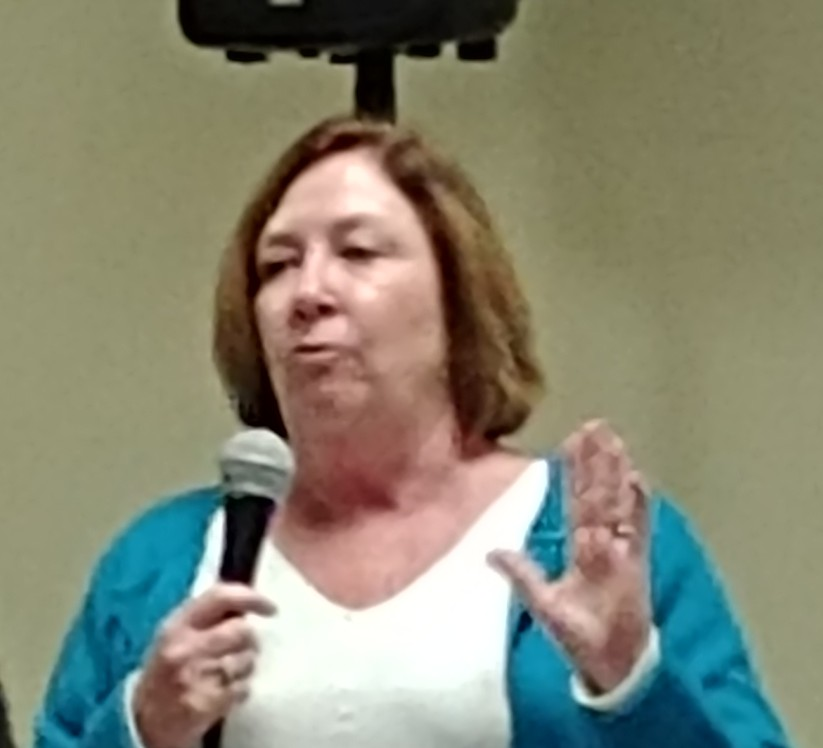

Member of the Illinois House of Representatives from the 111th district
- In office December 18, 2017 – January 13, 2021
- Preceded by: Daniel V. Beiser
- Succeeded by: Amy Elik

Personal details
- Party: Democratic
- Spouse: Melvin Bristow
- Children: 2
- Occupation: Economic Development Manager

Monica Bristow was a Democratic member of the Illinois House of Representatives, representing the 111th District from December 18, 2017, to January 13, 2021. The 111th district, located in the Metro East, includes all or parts of Alton, Bethalto, East Alton, Edwardsville, Elsah, Godfrey, Granite City, Hartford, Holiday Shores, Madison, Pontoon Beach, Rosewood Heights, Roxana, South Roxana, and Wood River. Prior to her appointment, she spent 14 years as President of the RiverBend Growth Association, an economic development association in Madison County, Illinois.

In the 2020 general election, Bristow lost to Republican candidate Amy Elik of Fosterburg by a 9-point margin.

== Electoral history ==
Illinois 111th State House District General Election, 2018
Party	Candidate	Votes	%
Democratic	Monica Bristow (incumbent)	19,095	50.47
Republican	Mike Babcock	18,739	49.53
Total votes		37,834	100.0

Illinois 111th State House District General Election, 2020
Party	Candidate	Votes	%
Republican	Amy Elik	26,756	54.35
Democratic	Monica J. Bristow (incumbent)	22,471	45.65
Total votes		49,227	100.0
