= Amy Elik =

American politician

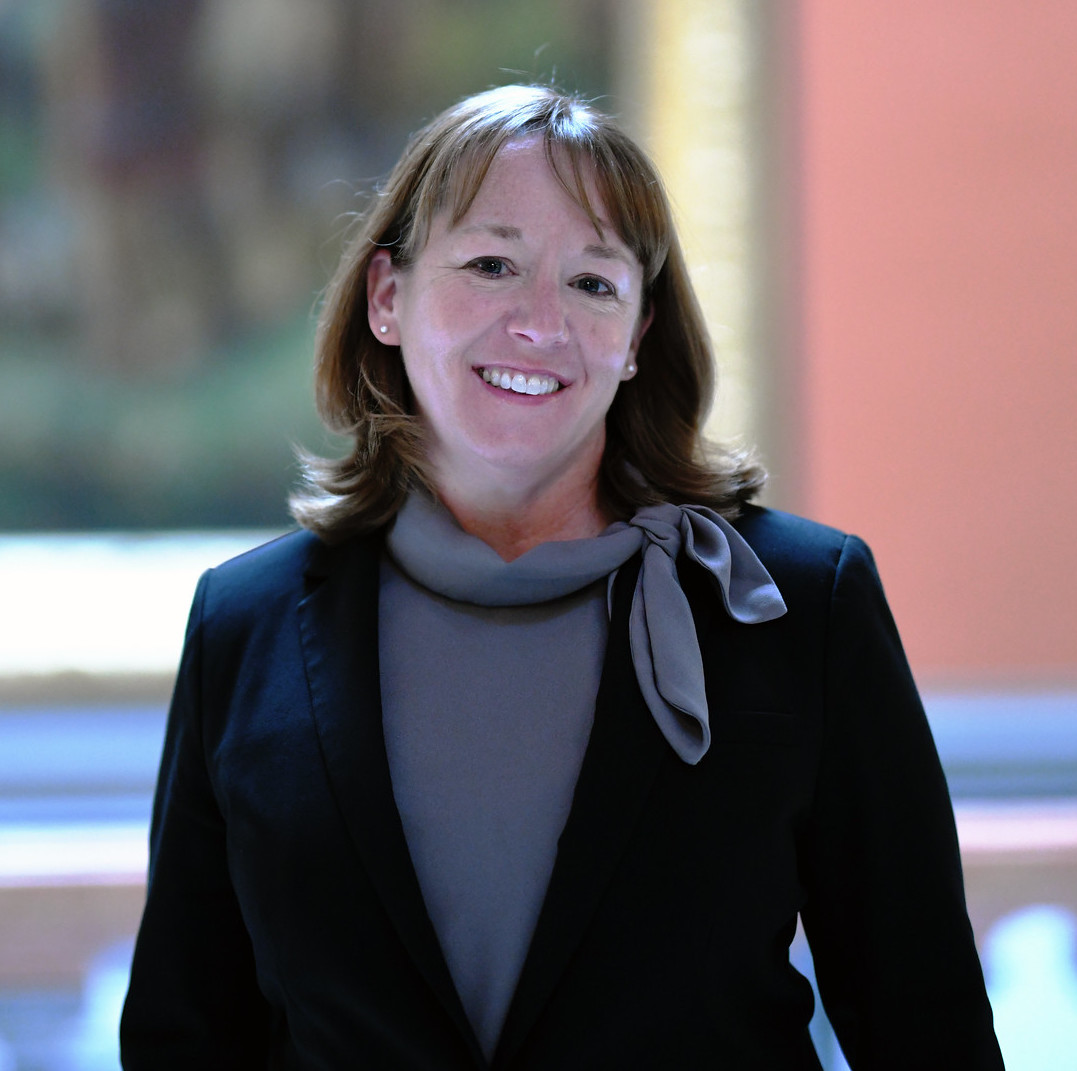

Member of the Illinois House of Representatives from the 111th district
- Incumbent
- Assumed office January 13, 2021
- Preceded by: Monica Bristow

Personal details
- Party: Republican
- Spouse: Don Elik
- Children: 2
- Education: University of Illinois
- Occupation: Accountant
- Website: Official website

Amy Elik is a Republican member of the Illinois House from the 111th district since January 13, 2021. The 111th district, located in the Metro East, includes all or parts of Alton, Bethalto, East Alton, Edwardsville, Glen Carbon, Godfrey, Granite City, Hartford, Madison, Mitchell, Pontoon Beach, Rosewood Heights, Roxana, South Roxana, and Wood River.

Elik was elected to the 111th district after defeating Democratic incumbent Monica Bristow in the 2020 Illinois House of Representatives election, and was re-elected in the 2022 Illinois House of Representatives election and again in the 2024 Illinois House of Representatives election.

Elik was appointed by Illinois House Republican Leader Tony McCombie to serve as the Assistant Republican Leader in January 2024. She was reappointed to continue to serve as Assistant Republican Leader in January 2025.

== Early life, education, and career ==
Elik has been a "lifelong resident of Madison County". After graduating from the University of Illinois Urbana-Champaign, she became a Certified Public Accountant and an auditor. She previously served as a Foster Township trustee from April 2013 to December 2020. She previously served on the school board for St. Mary's Catholic School in Alton. She has "been a member of the Rotary Club of the Riverbend and involved in the Fosterburg AG 4H Club as a co-leader." She previously "served as a volunteer and teacher with SCORE."

== Legislative career ==
Representative Elik is a member of the following Illinois House committees:

- Appropriations - General Service
- Education Policy
- Ethics & Elections
- International Relations, Tourism, & Trade
- Revenue & Finance
- Mandate Subcommittee
- Sales Tax Subcommittee
- Tax Policy: Sales Tax Subcommittee
- Tourism Subcommittee

She has been ranked as one of the most effective lawmakers in the General Assembly by the Center for Effective Lawmaking.

== Issues ==
Elik supports gun rights. She opposes abortion.

== Electoral history ==
Foster Township, Madison County, Illinois Board of Trustees General Election, 2017
Party	Candidate	Votes	%
Independent	Amy Elik	540	29.67
Independent	Richard Weber (incumbent)	470	25.82
Write-in		810	44.51
Total votes		1,820	100.0

Illinois 111th State House District General Election, 2020
Party	Candidate	Votes	%
Republican	Amy Elik	26,756	54.35
Democratic	Monica J. Bristow (incumbent)	22,471	45.65
Total votes		49,227	100.0
Republican gain from Democratic			

Illinois' 111th Representative District Election Results 2022
Party	Candidate	Votes	%
Republican	Amy Elik (incumbent)	19,933	56.47
Democratic	Joe Silkwood	15,366	43.53
Total votes		35,299	100.0
Republican hold			

Illinois' 111th Representative District Election Results 2024
Party	Candidate	Votes	%
Republican	Amy Elik (incumbent)	29,927	61.52
Democratic	Nick Raftopoulos	18,716	38.48
Total votes		48,643	100.0
Republican hold			

== Personal life ==
Elik currently resides in Godfrey, Illinois with her husband Don and her two children. She and Don have been married since 1997. She and her family are a member of St. Mary's Parish and attend St. Mary's Catholic Church in Alton, Illinois.
