= Meadowbrook, Illinois =

- Unincorporated community
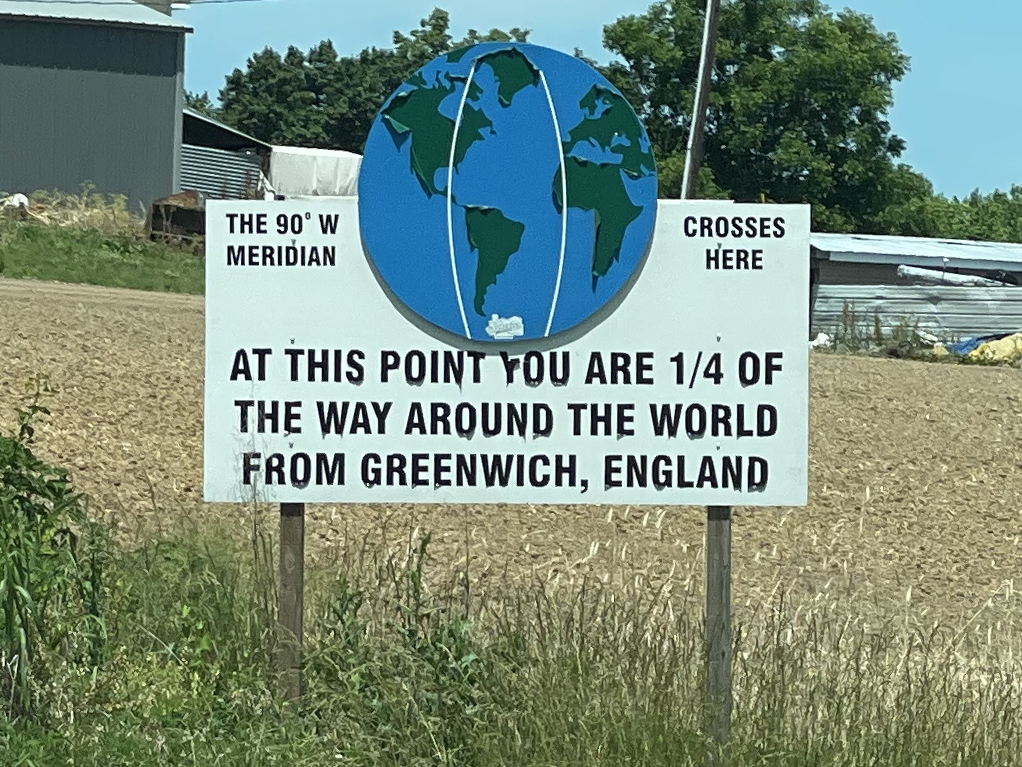
- Sign in Meadowbrook marking 90ºW

- Location within Illinois Location within the United States
- Coordinates: 38°53′54″N 90°0′22″W
- Country: United States
- State: Illinois
- County: Madison
- Elevation: 512 ft (156 m)
- Time zone: UTC-6 (Central (CST))
  - Summer (DST): UTC-5 (CDT)
- Area code: 618
- GNIS feature ID: 413351

Meadowbrook is an unincorporated community in Madison County, in the U.S. state of Illinois. Meadowbrook is located east of Bethalto and south of Moro. Meadowbrook is best known for being 90°W from the Prime Meridian. Meadowbrook is also the host of the Bethalto School District school of Meadowbrook Intermediate. Meadowbrook has two postal codes, 62010 and 62067. Meadowbrook is home to Bluestem Vodka Distillery. It is served by the Meadowbrook Fire Protection District and the Meadowbrook Public Water District, as well as the Bethalto Public Library District

== Honors ==
In 2026, the section of Illinois Route 140 traveling through Meadowbrook was designated the "Cpl. Tommy N. Miller Memorial Highway" by the Illinois General Assembly in honor of Civic Memorial High School graduate and Meadowbrook native Tommy Miller, who was killed in action in the Vietnam War. The bill was sponsored by State Representative Amy Elik.

== Fire in March 2023 ==
In March 2023, a fire broke out in Meadowbrook as a result of a severe forest or bush fire, exacerbated by strong winds.

== 2026 Home Explosion ==
On September 12, 2026 at approximately 2:15 PM, a home in Meadowbrook exploded, killing one resident. Several other homes were damaged in the explosion and the Illinois State Fire Marshal's office is continuing to investigate.
