= Wilbur Trimpe =

President of Lewis and Clark Community College 1973-1983

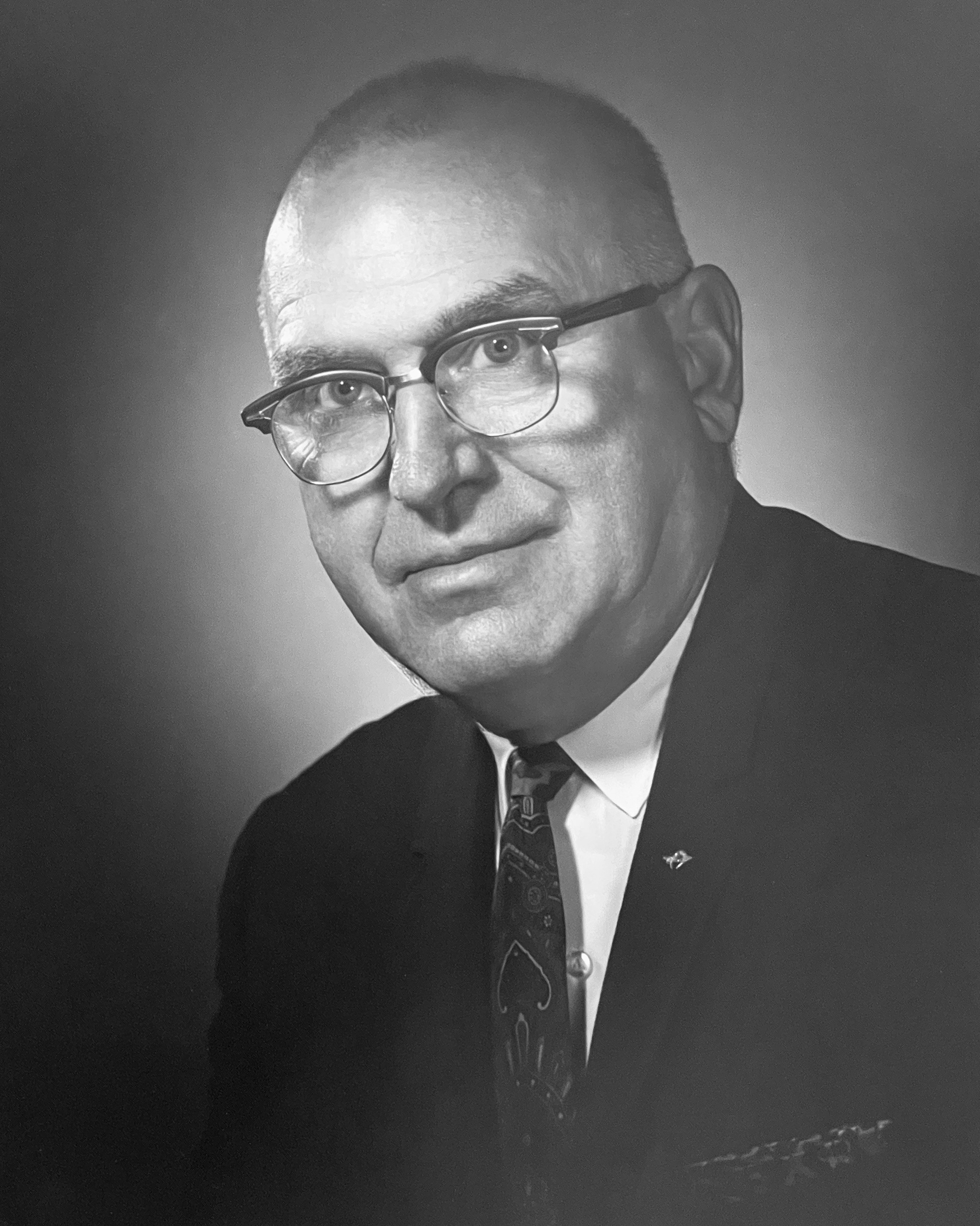

President of Lewis and Clark Community College
- In office 1973–1983
- Preceded by: Robert O. Birkhimer
- Succeeded by: J. Neil Admire

Regional Superintendent of Schools for Madison County, Illinois
- In office 1959–1973
- Succeeded by: Harold Briggs

Superintendent of schools for Bethalto Community Unit School District 8
- In office 1950–1959
- Succeeded by: Kermit Harden

Superintendent of schools for Havana Community Unit School District
- In office 1932–1950

Personal details
- Born: Wilbur Richard Louis Trimpe; June 10, 1906; Mason County, Illinois, U.S.
- Died: April 15, 1996 (aged 89); Morrison, Illinois
- Political party: Democratic
- Spouse: Wanita Trimpe
- Children: 2
- Education: Western Illinois college (Bachelor's degree) University of Illinois (Master's degree)

Wilbur Richard Louis Trimpe (/ˈtrɪmpi/ TRIM-pee; June 10, 1906 – April 15, 1996) was an American educator from Illinois. Over the course of his career, he served as a teacher, principal, superintendent, regional superintendent, and college president in Southern Illinois. Trimpe was the first superintendent for Bethalto Community Unit School District 8 and third president of Lewis and Clark Community College. During his time as Regional Superintendent of Schools for Madison County, Trimpe advocated for the establishment and development of a system of statewide community colleges for Illinois.

== Early life ==
Trimpe was born June 10, 1906, to Carl and Katherine (Leithoff) Trimpe. He was raised in Mason County, Illinois. He earned a bachelor’s degree from Western Illinois college in 1942, a master’s degree from the University of Illinois in 1945, and worked towards a doctorate degree at both the University of Colorado and Southern Illinois University.

== Career ==
On May 20, 1950, it was announced that Trimpe was hired as superintendent of Bethalto Elementary District 152 and the newly formed Civic Memorial High School District 100. However, a referendum on June 2, 1950, combined the two districts, establishing Bethalto Community Unit School District 8. When Trimpe left Bethalto CUSD8 in 1959, Wilbur Trimpe Junior High (now Trimpe Middle School) was named after him.

After the 1958-1959 school year, Trimpe left Bethalto Schools upon being elected Regional Superintendent of Schools for Madison County. He served as regional superintendent from 1959 to 1973. In 1973, Trimpe was selected to be the third president of Lewis and Clark Community College. He held this position until his retirement in 1983. In his previous position as regional superintendent, Trimpe lead the effort in 1969 to create the Lewis and Clark Community College district. The vocational technical building on campus was dedicated to Trimpe and named the "Trimpe Vocational-Technical Building”.

In 1982, Trimpe was inducted to the Illinois Basketball Hall of Fame for his 33 years of high school basketball officiating.

== Philanthropy ==
In 1995, Trimpe created the Wanita E. and Wilbur R.L. Trimpe Endowment Scholarship Fund. The scholarship is awarded to Civic Memorial High School graduates entering Lewis and Clark Community College.

== Death ==
Wilbur Trimpe died in Morrison, Illinois, on April 15, 1996. He was 89 years old.
