= Roxana, Illinois =

- Village
- Location in Madison County, Illinois
- Coordinates: 38°49′53″N 90°02′47″W
- Country: United States
- State: Illinois
- County: Madison
- Townships: Wood River, Fort Russell, Chouteau, Edwardsville
- Founded: 1921

Area
  - Total: 7.22 sq mi (18.71 km^{2})
  - Land: 7.10 sq mi (18.39 km^{2})
  - Water: 0.12 sq mi (0.31 km^{2})
- Elevation: 436 ft (133 m)

Population (2020)
  - Total: 1,454
  - Density: 204.8/sq mi (79.06/km^{2})
- Time zone: UTC−6 (CST)
  - Summer (DST): UTC−5 (CDT)
- ZIP codes: 62084 (Roxana); 62025 (Edwardsville)
- Area code: 618
- FIPS code: 17-66131
- GNIS feature ID: 2399135
- Website: www.roxana-il.org

Roxana is a village in Madison County, Illinois, United States. The population was 1,454 at the 2020 census.

A majority of the land in Roxana is taken up by the Wood River Refinery, an oil refinery operated by Phillips 66. The refinery was originally built and owned by Shell Oil. As of 2016, the refinery is capable of refining 314,000 barrels (49,900 m^{3}) of oil per day to produce gasoline, jet fuel, diesel, asphalt, propane, and other products, and supplies part of the St. Louis, Chicago, Indiana, and Ohio regions.

Roxana is considered to be part of the River Bend portion of the St. Louis Metro East area.

== History ==
In 1918, Shell Oil Company opened its Wood River Refinery in what was then called "Wood River Field", an area south of the city of Wood River. As houses began being built close to the refinery, the population there grew to the point that, in 1921, this unincorporated area became the incorporated village of Roxana.

The origin of the village's name is unknown. Local lore is that the name "Roxana" was chosen to honor a "Queen Roxanne" of the Netherlands, inasmuch as the village owed its very existence to Netherlands-state-owned Royal Dutch Shell. But there had never been a Queen Roxanne of the Netherlands. The Dutch monarch at the time was Wilhelmina of the Netherlands. However, Royal Dutch/Shell Group also founded Roxana Petroleum Company in 1912 in Oklahoma to explore for and produce crude oil.

Subsequently, Shell built refineries near New Orleans in 1916, at Wood River in 1918, and parallel with US Route 20 across Hammond and East Chicago in Lake County, Indiana, in 1926. The Hammond-East Chicago refinery was linked directly by pipeline to Wood River and resulted in the residential neighborhood of Roxana (East Chicago) adjacent to it.

Originally constructed on 336 acres (1.36 km^{2}), the Wood River Refinery now covers approximately 2,200 acres (8.9 km^{2}). Phillips 66 acquired it, the largest in its system, in the early 2000s.

A Baptist church was organized in September 1921, and the land where the current First Baptist Church of Roxana now stands, at the corner of Tydeman Street and Central Avenue, was purchased in early 1922. The first services were held there on December 3, 1922. J.A. Wilson served as the church's first pastor.

A formal village hall, called for by a vote for a "Municipal Building", was built on $36,000 worth of bonds in 1938. It currently houses Roxana's Village President, Treasurer, Water Department, and Clerk's offices, the fire and police departments, the village board room, and a municipal gymnasium.

In the early 1940s, a large Art Deco-style theater was built at the northwest corner of Thomas Street and Central Avenue, at 400 N. Central Avenue. To the south across Thomas Street used to sit Burbank School, built in 1936 (torn down in 2009), and at the southeast corner of the intersection lay Roxana Drug Store. Seating approximately 580 people, the theater was originally designed for vaudeville acts as well as movie showings. In 1949, a tornado tore the roof off, but after repairs were made, the theater reopened. In the late 1960s, it was closed for nearly two years before being sold in June 1968 from the estate of Albert Critchlow to Bloomer Amusement Co. of Belleville. It was thereafter operated as "BAC Cine" for many years. In 1992, the Cine was purchased by Kerasotes Theatres, Inc., of Springfield, Illinois, which operated it until its closing in February 2002.

In 2000, the theater was purchased from Kerasotes and was donated to the Roxana Church of the Nazarene, which is located just to the north. The church now operates the building as the Nazarene Community Center, where it is available for rental and group events.

== Geography ==
Roxana is located in western Madison County and is bordered to the north by Wood River, to the west by Hartford, and to the southwest by South Roxana. Illinois Route 143 passes through the northern side of the village, leading northwest into Wood River and southeast 6 miles (10 km) to Edwardsville, the county seat. Illinois Route 111 passes through the northwest part of the village, leading north into Wood River and south 8 miles (13 km) to Pontoon Beach. Illinois Route 255, a four-lane freeway, runs through the east side of the village, with access from Exits 5 and 6. Route 255 leads northwest 13 miles (21 km) to Godfrey and south 6 miles (10 km) to Interstates 255 and 270 in Pontoon Beach.

According to the U.S. Census Bureau, Roxana has a total area of 7.2 square miles (19 km^{2}), of which 0.1 square miles (0.3 km^{2}), or 1.69%, are water.

=== Roxana Park ===
In May 1934, a village ordinance was passed creating a Recreation Board that would develop a plan for activities and playground sites, establish a budget and employ a Supervisor to manage the operation. In 1938, Village Hall was constructed which included a gymnasium for recreational activities. The first meeting of the Village Board in the newly constructed Village Hall was held on Wednesday, February 1, 1939. Village Hall, consisting of the gym, fire department, police department and other village offices, is located at the intersection of Central Avenue and West Third Street.

In 1947, land was purchased for the purpose of park and recreation facilities, and a softball diamond was constructed. The park is located in the northeastern part of the village, to the north and east of Roxana High School.

In 1952, the Park District was incorporated, followed by the addition of a public swimming pool in 1957. Adjacent to the pool was a recreation area which included trampolines, miniature golf and donkey cart rides.

In 1959, additional land was purchased, and a house was acquired from Shell Oil Company and moved to the property. This was the original meeting place of many community groups. When the house became too small to accommodate the needs of the people, the Rox-Arena was constructed in 1969. For many years, Roxana Park Director Lyle Dona lived in this house within the park.

In the years following, picnic shelters were added along with additional ball fields, concession stand, soccer field, playgrounds and bike/walking paths. The main park now is home to four baseball diamonds—the High School Diamond, the Lighted Diamond, the South Diamond and the Picnic Diamond.

In 1993, Burbank Park was purchased from the school district. It now contains a baseball diamond, playground, picnic shelter, soccer field, and basketball court. It is the site of the annual Roxana Homecoming Festival held each May.

To commemorate the 50th anniversary of the Park District, a new pool house was constructed in 2002.

== Demographics ==
Historical population
Census	Pop.	Note	%±
1930	1,139		—
1940	1,255		10.2%
1950	1,911		52.3%
1960	2,090		9.4%
1970	1,882		−10.0%
1980	1,587		−15.7%
1990	1,562		−1.6%
2000	1,547		−1.0%
2010	1,542		−0.3%
2020	1,454		−5.7%
U.S. Decennial Census

=== 2020 census ===
As of the 2020 census, Roxana had a population of 1,454. The median age was 39.0 years. 23.3% of residents were under the age of 18 and 17.7% of residents were 65 years of age or older. For every 100 females there were 95.7 males, and for every 100 females age 18 and over there were 93.9 males age 18 and over.

97.9% of residents lived in urban areas, while 2.1% lived in rural areas.

There were 617 households in Roxana, of which 33.2% had children under the age of 18 living in them. Of all households, 38.4% were married-couple households, 21.4% were households with a male householder and no spouse or partner present, and 30.5% were households with a female householder and no spouse or partner present. About 31.3% of all households were made up of individuals and 13.9% had someone living alone who was 65 years of age or older.

There were 668 housing units, of which 7.6% were vacant. The homeowner vacancy rate was 1.0% and the rental vacancy rate was 7.3%.

Racial composition as of the 2020 census
Race	Number	Percent
White	1,304	89.7%
Black or African American	31	2.1%
American Indian and Alaska Native	10	0.7%
Asian	9	0.6%
Native Hawaiian and Other Pacific Islander	2	0.1%
Some other race	15	1.0%
Two or more races	83	5.7%
Hispanic or Latino (of any race)	49	3.4%

=== 2000 census ===
As of the census of 2000, there were 1,547 people, 655 households, and 436 families residing in the village. The population density was 227.5 inhabitants per square mile (87.8/km^{2}). There were 697 housing units at an average density of 102.5 per square mile (39.6/km^{2}). The racial makeup of the village was 98.51% White, 0.13% African American, 0.26% Native American, 0.26% Asian, 0.39% from other races, and 0.45% from two or more races. Hispanic or Latino of any race were 0.65% of the population.

There were 655 households, out of which 28.5% had children under the age of 18 living with them, 52.4% were married couples living together, 10.7% had a female householder with no husband present, and 33.4% were non-families. 29.5% of all households were made up of individuals, and 13.7% had someone living alone who was 65 years of age or older. The average household size was 2.36 and the average family size was 2.92.

In the village, the age distribution of the population shows 23.4% under the age of 18, 8.1% from 18 to 24, 29.0% from 25 to 44, 23.0% from 45 to 64, and 16.5% who were 65 years of age or older. The median age was 38 years. For every 100 females, there were 92.2 males. For every 100 females age 18 and over, there were 90.8 males.

The median income for a household in the village was $38,800, and the median income for a family was $45,500. Males had a median income of $40,078 versus $27,045 for females. The per capita income for the village was $20,511. About 2.5% of families and 3.8% of the population were below the poverty line, including 3.0% of those under age 18 and 5.7% of those age 65 or over.

== Education ==
Located within the village is Roxana High School. The school district is served by two elementary schools, though only one is located within the village limits of Roxana. Central Elementary School is in Roxana, while South Roxana Elementary School is within South Roxana. The former Burbank Elementary School, located at the corner of Thomas Street and Central Avenue, closed in 1984 and was demolished in 2009.

Nearby colleges and universities include Southern Illinois University Edwardsville, Principia College, a four-year private college in Elsah, and Lewis and Clark Community College in Godfrey. The Dental School of Southern Illinois University is located close by in the city of Alton.

== Transportation ==
Roxana is served by Amtrak in Alton, St. Louis Regional Airport (formerly known as Civic Memorial Airport) in Bethalto, and Lambert-St. Louis International Airport.

The nearest interstate highway is Interstate 270, approximately 6 miles (10 km) to the south, although Illinois Route 255 is a controlled access highway, meeting federal interstate standards. Easy access can be had to Interstate 55, Interstate 70 and Interstate 64.

Illinois Route 111 (Central Avenue) is the main route through Roxana. It is a four-lane, non-divided highway through the village, and boasts the only two stoplights in town (located at its intersections with Thomas Street and Tydeman Street).

Illinois Route 255 was completed in 1998 and runs through the eastern portion of the village limits, east of the Wood River refinery. Although the village has plans to develop the area near Route 255, this has not yet occurred.

== Notable person ==
- Harry Gallatin, forward and center with the Detroit Pistons
