= Cottage Hills, Illinois =

- Unincorporated community
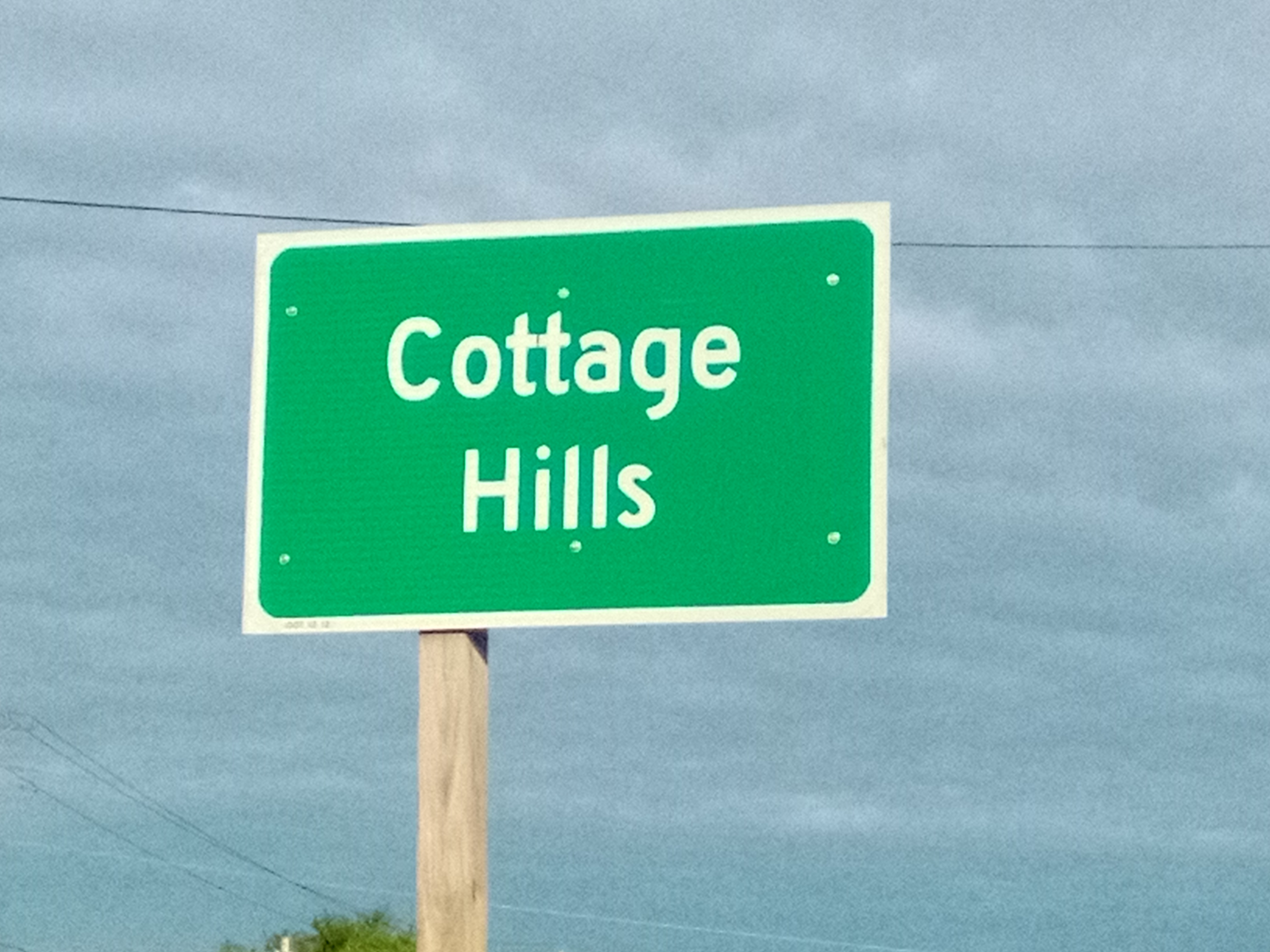

- Location within Illinois Location within the United States
- Coordinates: 38°54′11″N 90°04′12″W
- Country: United States
- State: Illinois
- County: Madison
- Elevation: 512 ft (156 m)

Population
  - Total: 3,604
- Time zone: UTC-6 (Central (CST))
  - Summer (DST): UTC-5 (CDT)
- ZIP Code: 62018
- Area code: 618
- GNIS feature ID: 406618

Cottage Hills is an unincorporated community in Madison County, Illinois, United States. In 2018, the Cottage Hills ZIP Code area served a population of 3,604. Cottage Hills is west of Bethalto, north of Rosewood Heights, east of East Alton, and is a part of the Greater St. Louis. Cottage Hills has a post office with ZIP Code 62018. Between 1915 and 1980 a railway under the name of St. Louis Division Old Line used to pass through the community. Similar to most communities in Madison County, Cottage Hills is a bedroom community.

== History ==
Cottage Hills was likely inhabited around the same time as the other parts of Madison County, becoming primarily used for farming. Due to this, during the late 1800s a train station used for loading grain was established. Cottage Hills during this time was originally known as Possum Ridge, for its location on the edge of the Mississippi Bluffs.

Following the 1934 purchase of the Stoker Family's farm in the region, work on building a suburb in the region began, fueled mostly by people moving out of Bethalto. Between 1934 and the 1950s, Cottage Hills grew in size substantially, with a post office being established in 1941. During this time the Rio Theater opened, closing in 1956. From 1934 to the late 1950s, Cottage Hills developed into a community of around 4,000 people.

In the coming decades, Cottage Hills would slowly decline, with the railway that passed through eventually closing and being torn down. It was replaced with a bike path built in 2018. As opened, the trail ran north from Kutter Park along Center Street, then east along the former railroad corridor to a point west of Illinois Route 255. During the late 20th century, Cottage Hills' economy would slowly die out, with most people going to Bethalto or Alton for their entertainment and food needs. Due to this, industries like the motor industry developed heavily during this time, with the main road, MacArthur Drive, or Route 140 becoming a large hub for motor specific buildings. With the industry contributing about half of the locally employed people in the community.
