= CMHS =

CMHS may stand for several different entities:

Schools in the United States

- Cabell Midland High School in Ona, West Virginia
- Canon McMillan High School in Canonsburg, Pennsylvania
- Caddo Magnet High School in Shreveport, Louisiana
- Central Mountain High School in Mill Hall, Pennsylvania
- Cheyenne Mountain High School in Colorado Springs, Colorado
- Civic Memorial High School
- Costa Mesa High School (now Costa Mesa Middle and High School)
- Cox Mill High School in Concord, North Carolina
- Crete-Monee High School
- Cardinal McCarrick High School
- Cimarron-Memorial High School in Las Vegas, Nevada
- Center Moriches High School in Center Moriches, New York

Schools in Canada

- Central Memorial High School in Calgary, Alberta

Other

- Center for Mental Health Services
