= Daniel V. Beiser =

American politician

Daniel Beiser

Member of the Illinois House of Representatives from the 111th district
- In office December 2004 – December 17, 2017
- Preceded by: Steve Davis
- Succeeded by: Monica Bristow

Personal details
- Party: Democratic
- Spouse: Terri
- Children: Two Children
- Education: Southern Illinois University

Daniel V. Beiser is an American politician and former Democratic member of the Illinois House of Representatives, representing the 111th District.

He was appointed in 2004 to replace Steve Davis who resigned. Beiser has bachelor's and master's degrees from Southern Illinois University Edwardsville.

In his time as Representative, Beiser addressed significant issues facing the Metro-east, including education funding; the fight against methamphetamine and sex offenders; and the protection of Social Security. Beiser has also taken a leading role in the fight to provide financial relief for local residents in light of increased electric rates and sponsored a non-partisan conceal carry bill.

On August 30, 2017, Beiser announced his retirement from the Illinois House of Representatives, making him the 15th legislator in 2017 to do so. He then resigned on December 17, 2017. Monica Bristow was appointed to succeed Beiser as state representative.

On August 28, 2019, Governor J.B. Prizker appointed Beiser to serve as a member of the Illinois Racing Board. On April 23, 2020, Pritzker designated Beiser to be the Chair of the Board. On January 10, 2021, Pritzker nominated Beiser for a term ending July 1, 2026. He was not confirmed during the 101st General Assembly and his appointment was carried over to the 102nd General Assembly for consideration.
