= Bethalto Village Hall =

- U.S. National Register of Historic Places
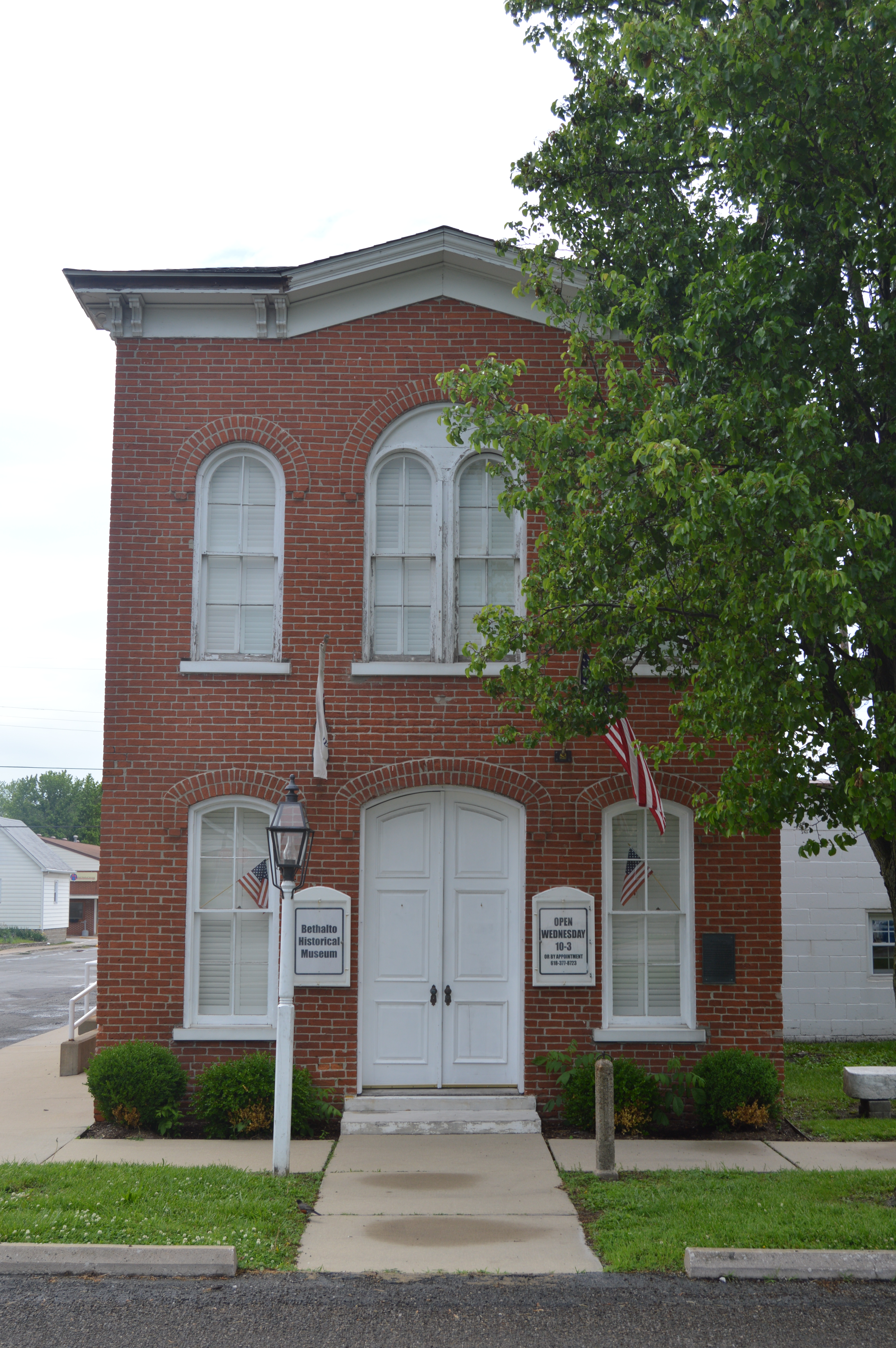
- Main entrance

- Location within Illinois Location within the United States
- Location: 124 Main St., Bethalto, Illinois
- Coordinates: 38°54′36″N 90°2′30″W
- Area: less than one acre
- Built: 1873
- Architectural style: Italianate
- NRHP reference No.: 87002049
- Added to NRHP: December 2, 1987

The Bethalto Village Hall is the former center of government of Bethalto, Illinois. Built in 1873, the building is the oldest remaining city hall building in Madison County. While Bethalto was platted in 1854, the need for a village hall did not arise until the city incorporated as a village in 1873. The two-story brick building was designed in the Italianate style. The first floor of the building housed government offices, while the second floor had a meeting room used by the village's fraternal organizations and community groups. In 1938, the village built a fire station annex onto the building. The village government operated in the building until 1963.

The hall also provided classroom space for local schools and housed the public library.

The building was added to the National Register of Historic Places on December 2, 1987.

The Bethalto Historical Museum is housed in the former Village Hall. Exhibits include the city's tiny one-room jail and displays about local history, including a recreated classroom.
