= St. Louis Regional Airport =

- IATA: ALN; ICAO: KALN; FAA LID: ALN

Summary
- Airport type: Public
- Owner: St. Louis Regional
- Serves: Alton, Illinois
- Location: Bethalto, Illinois
- Elevation AMSL: 544 ft (166 m)
- Coordinates: 38°53′25″N 090°02′46″W
- Public transit access: MCT
- Website: www.StLouisRegional.com

Map
- Location of airport in Illinois ALN (the United States)

Runways
Direction	Length		Surface
Direction	ft	m	Surface
11/29	8,099	2,469	Asphalt
17/35	6,500	1,981	Asphalt

Statistics
- Aircraft operations (2017): 39,828
- Based aircraft (2018): 78
- Sources: FAA and airport website

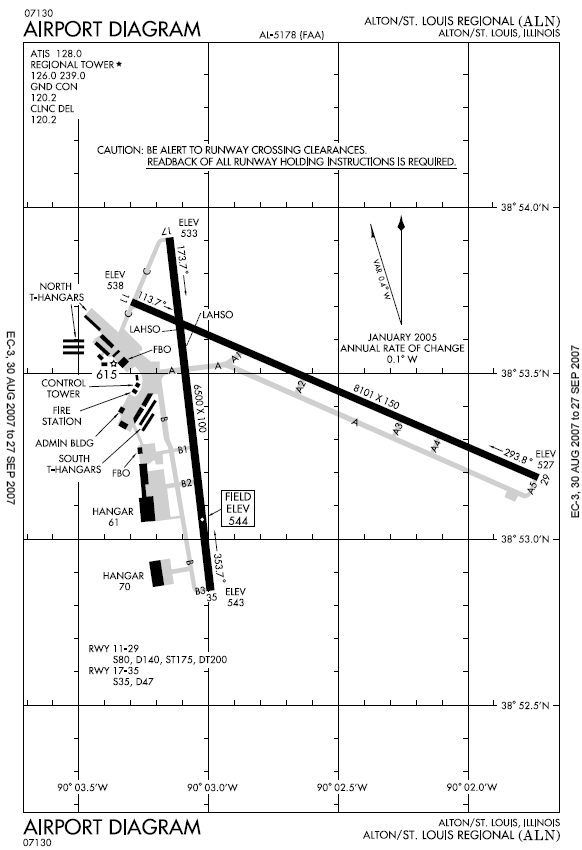
Diagram for St. Louis Regional (ALN)

St. Louis Regional Airport (IATA: ALN, ICAO: KALN, FAA LID: ALN) is a public airport four miles (6 km) east of Alton, in Madison County, Illinois, United States. It is in the village of Bethalto but its mailing address is East Alton.

Its operations are paid for by an airport taxation district created in 1946, which collects taxes from property owners in the Madison County townships of Alton, Wood River, Foster and Fort Russell.

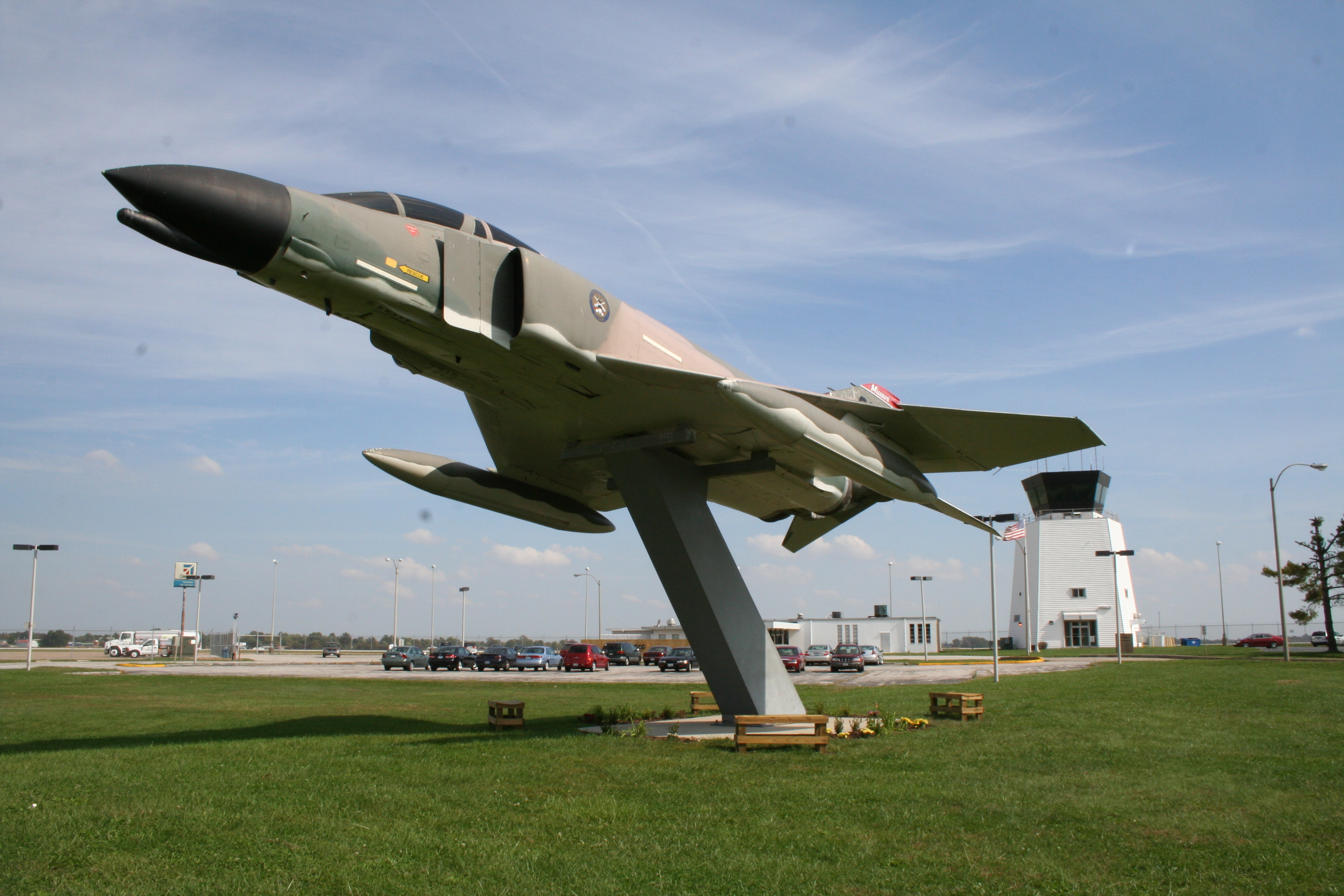
F-4 Phantom II on display at the airport with the control tower in the background

== History ==
Civic Memorial Airport opened in 1946 and received its current name in 1984. The property was purchased by Colonel Milton Waltson after his discharge from the Army Air Corps after WWII. Walston also purchased some surplus Quonset huts and airplanes from the military. The name Walston Aviation is visible on one of the still remaining original buildings at the airport. Scheduled service to Chicago, Springfield and Carbondale on Air Illinois was provided in the mid-1970s.

== Facilities ==
The 2,250 acres (910 ha) airfield sits at 544 ft (166 m) MSL. It has an 8,099 by 150 ft (2,469 by 46 m) runway that runs roughly east–west (11/29) and a 6,500 by 100 ft (1,981 by 30 m) crosswind runway that runs north–south (17/35). With an ILS approach and tower controlled class D airspace, the facility can accommodate a Boeing 747.

For the 12-month period ending April 30, 2017, the airport had 39,828 aircraft operations, an average of 109 per day: 85% general aviation, 13% air taxi, 2% military and less than 1% commercial service. In March 2018, there were 79 aircraft based at this airport: 73 single-engine, 4 multi-engine and 2 jet.

West Star Aviation is the largest fixed-base operations (FBO) company at the airport. In 2008, Premiere Air changed its name to West Star aviation, and the company has remained since that time. The company provides a wide range of services from engine repair, interior and exterior paint services, avionics installation and repair, refurbishing, aircraft part sales, and airframe inspections.

The airport is popular with blimp crews, being a frequent stop for blimps on transcontinental flights across the United States.

== Ground transportation ==
Public transit service to the airport is provided by Madison County Transit.

== See also ==
- List of airports in Illinois
- Alton station
