= Rosewood Heights, Illinois =

- Census-designated place
- Location within Illinois Location within the United States
- Coordinates: 38°53′18″N 90°04′20″W
- Country: United States
- State: Illinois
- County: Madison
- Township: Wood River

Area
  - Total: 1.674 sq mi (4.34 km^{2})
  - Land: 1.671 sq mi (4.33 km^{2})
  - Water: 0.003 sq mi (0.0078 km^{2})
- Elevation: 525 ft (160 m)

Population (2020)
  - Total: 3,971
  - Density: 2,376.4/sq mi (917.5/km^{2})
- Time zone: UTC-6 (CST)
  - Summer (DST): UTC-5 (CDT)
- ZIP Codes: 62024 (East Alton); 62018 (Cottage Hills)
- GNIS feature ID: 2393216

Rosewood Heights is an unincorporated community and census-designated place (CDP) in Madison County, Illinois, United States. The population was 3,971 at the 2020 census. It is part of the Metro East region of the Greater St. Louis metropolitan area.

== Geography ==
Rosewood Heights is located in northwestern Madison County. It is bordered to the east by Bethalto, to the south by Wood River, to the west by East Alton, and to the north by Cottage Hills.

Illinois Routes 111 and 140 (West MacArthur Drive) form the northern border of the CDP. IL 140 leads west 6 miles (10 km) to Alton and east through Bethalto 12 miles (19 km) to Hamel, while IL 111 leads northwest 9 miles (14 km) to Godfrey and south 4 miles (6 km) to the center of Wood River. Illinois Route 255, a four-lane expressway, runs along the east edge of Rosewood Heights, with access from Exit 10 (IL 111–140). IL 255 leads south 10 miles (16 km) to Interstates 255 and 270 and northwest 9 miles (14 km) to its end at U.S. Route 67 in Godfrey. Downtown St. Louis is 27 miles (43 km) southwest of Rosewood Heights.

According to the United States Census Bureau, the CDP has a total area of 1.7 square miles (4.4 km^{2}), of which 0.003 square miles (0.008 km^{2}), or 0.18%, are water. The community drains northwest toward the East Fork of the Wood River, which joins the Mississippi River at East Alton.

== Demographics ==
=== 2020 census ===
As of the 2020 census, Rosewood Heights had a population of 3,971. The median age was 44.4 years. 19.8% of residents were under the age of 18 and 22.1% of residents were 65 years of age or older. For every 100 females there were 95.6 males, and for every 100 females age 18 and over there were 94.5 males age 18 and over.

100.0% of residents lived in urban areas, while 0.0% lived in rural areas.

There were 1,669 households in Rosewood Heights, of which 27.2% had children under the age of 18 living in them. Of all households, 50.3% were married-couple households, 16.1% were households with a male householder and no spouse or partner present, and 25.7% were households with a female householder and no spouse or partner present. About 25.5% of all households were made up of individuals and 13.2% had someone living alone who was 65 years of age or older.

There were 1,765 housing units, of which 5.4% were vacant. The homeowner vacancy rate was 1.4% and the rental vacancy rate was 2.5%.

Racial composition as of the 2020 census
Race	Number	Percent
White	3,632	91.5%
Black or African American	46	1.2%
American Indian and Alaska Native	7	0.2%
Asian	26	0.7%
Native Hawaiian and Other Pacific Islander	2	0.1%
Some other race	32	0.8%
Two or more races	226	5.7%
Hispanic or Latino (of any race)	87	2.2%

=== 2000 census ===
At the 2000 census there were 4,262 people, 1,688 households, and 1,299 families living in the CDP. The population density was 1,988.0 inhabitants per square mile (767.6/km^{2}). There were 1,754 housing units at an average density of 818.1 per square mile (315.9/km^{2}). The racial makeup of the CDP was 98.78% White, 0.12% African American, 0.23% Native American, 0.21% Asian, 0.21% from other races, and 0.45% from two or more races. Hispanic or Latino of any race were 0.82%.

Of the 1,688 households 29.7% had children under the age of 18 living with them, 64.5% were married couples living together, 9.1% had a female householder with no husband present, and 23.0% were non-families. 20.0% of households were one person and 10.4% were one person aged 65 or older. The average household size was 2.52 and the average family size was 2.88.

The age distribution was 22.2% under the age of 18, 7.6% from 18 to 24, 26.1% from 25 to 44, 26.0% from 45 to 64, and 18.1% 65 or older. The median age was 41 years. For every 100 females, there were 90.6 males. For every 100 females age 18 and over, there were 90.5 males.

The median household income was $46,701 and the median family income was $53,365. Males had a median income of $44,111 versus $28,176 for females. The per capita income for the CDP was $20,527. About 7.2% of families and 7.8% of the population were below the poverty line, including 8.4% of those under age 18 and 3.2% of those age 65 or over.

== Education ==
Rosewood Heights is divided between two school districts, Roxana Community Unit School District 1 and Bethalto Community Unit School District 8.
