= Civic Memorial High School =

Public high school in Bethalto, Illinois, US

Location
- 200 School Street; Bethalto, Illinois 62010; United States; 38°54′33″N 90°03′46″W

Information
- Former name: Bethalto High School
- Type: Public high school
- Motto: "Pound the Stone"
- Established: c. 1951
- School district: Bethalto Community Unit School District 8
- Principal: Justin Newell
- Teaching staff: 50.15 (FTE)
- Grades: 9–12
- Enrollment: 752 (2023–24)
- Student to teacher ratio: 15.00
- Colors: Purple and gold
- Nickname: Eagles
- Website: civicmemorial.bethalto.org

Civic Memorial High School is a public high school in Bethalto, Illinois, that is part of the Bethalto Community Unit School District 8. It serves students from Bethalto, Meadowbrook, Cottage Hills, and parts of Rosewood Heights and Moro.

== History ==
The school was originally named Bethalto High School. The name was changed to Civic Memorial High School when the new building was completed in the 1950s.

The first graduating class was that of 1951. Prior to that, students attended classes through their junior year, then graduated from either Wood River High School or Roxana High School. The original Civic Memorial High School building at 910 Second St. (the current Wilbur Trimpe Middle School) housed a three-year high school (grades 10–12) until the 1974–75 school year, when the school added 9th grade. Civic Memorial moved into its present building at 200 School Street for the 1979–80 school year.
