= South Roxana, Illinois =

- Village
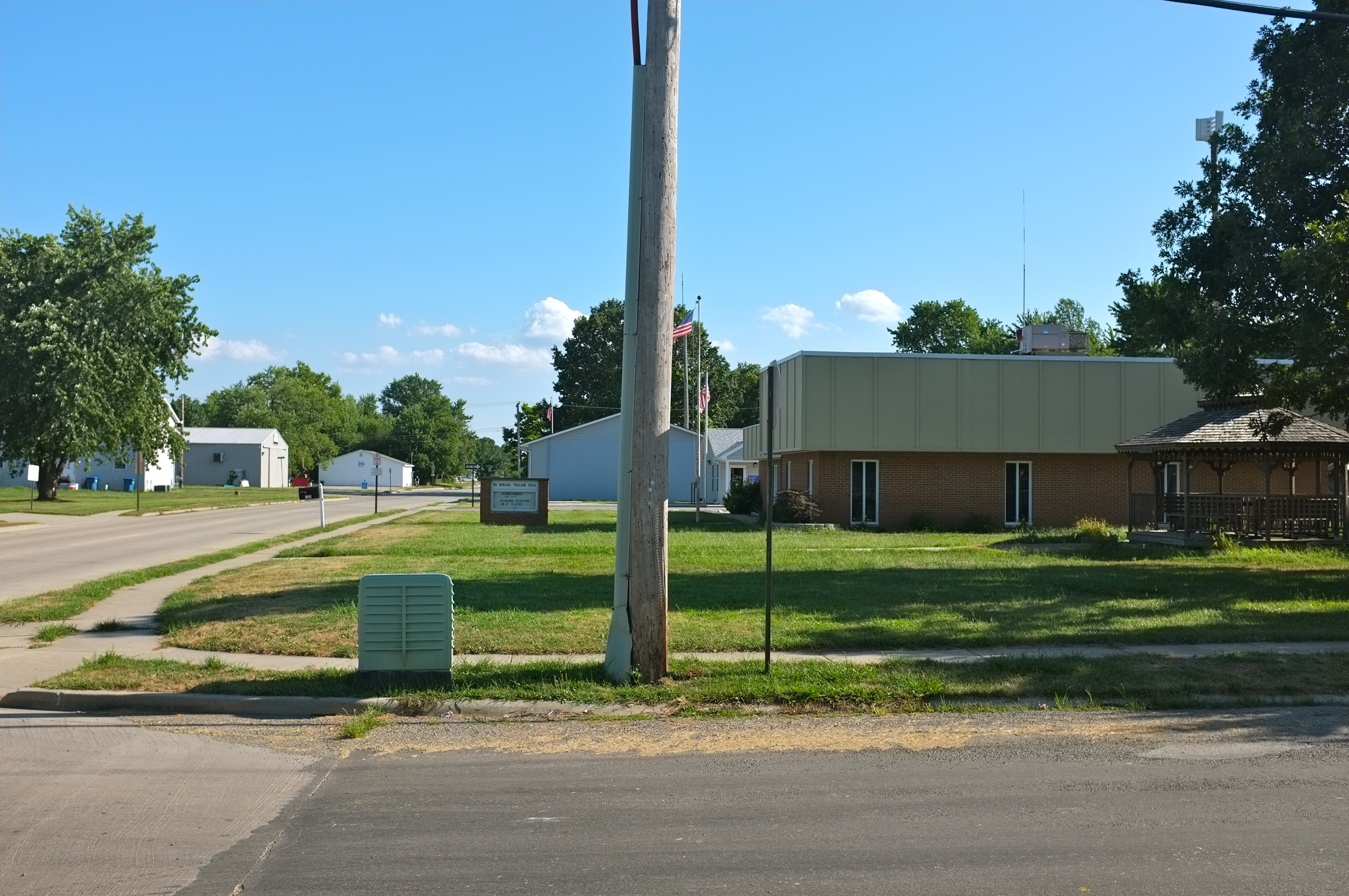
- Street scene in South Roxana

- Location in Madison County, Illinois
- Coordinates: 38°49′43″N 90°03′40″W
- Country: United States
- State: Illinois
- County: Madison
- Township: Chouteau
- Founded: c. 1920
- Incorporated: March 1967

Area
  - Total: 2.26 sq mi (5.85 km^{2})
  - Land: 2.16 sq mi (5.59 km^{2})
  - Water: 0.10 sq mi (0.26 km^{2})
- Elevation: 427 ft (130 m)

Population (2020)
  - Total: 1,891
- Time zone: UTC-6 (CST)
  - Summer (DST): UTC-5 (CDT)
- ZIP code: 62087
- Area code: 618
- FIPS code: 17-71240
- GNIS feature ID: 2399856
- Website: southroxana.org

South Roxana, incorporated in March 1967, is a village in Madison County, Illinois, United States. The population was 1,891 at the 2020 census.

== History ==
South Roxana grew up in the 1920s as a residential settlement immediately south of Roxana, the company village that had developed around the Shell Oil refinery now known as the Wood River Refinery. The tract was laid out about 1920 by a St. Louis development group, the Gonterman interests, which subdivided former farmland into building lots; within a few years dozens of houses had been built, many of them occupied by refinery workers.

Residents discussed forming a village as early as the 1920s, but the question was set aside for decades, and incorporation referendums were defeated more than once before voters approved village status in March 1967. Lawrence Cunningham became the village's first mayor.

== Geography ==
South Roxana is bordered to the north and east by the village of Roxana, to the south by a western extension of the city of Edwardsville, and to the west by the village of Hartford.

Illinois Route 111 runs along the western edge of South Roxana, leading north 2 miles (3 km) to Wood River and south 6 miles (10 km) to Pontoon Beach. Downtown St. Louis is 20 miles (32 km) to the south-southwest. Illinois Route 255, a four-lane expressway, passes just east of the village limits, with access from Exits 3 and 5. Route 255 leads south 4 miles (6 km) to Interstates 255 and 270 and north 6 miles (10 km) to Bethalto.

According to the U.S. Census Bureau, South Roxana has a total area of 2.3 square miles (6.0 km^{2}), of which 0.1 square miles (0.3 km^{2}), or 4.51%, are water.

== Demographics ==
Historical population
Census	Pop.	Note	%±
1960	2,010		—
1970	2,241		11.5%
1980	2,286		2.0%
1990	1,961		−14.2%
2000	1,888		−3.7%
2010	2,053		8.7%
2020	1,891		−7.9%
U.S. Decennial Census

=== 2020 census ===
As of the 2020 census, South Roxana had a population of 1,891. The median age was 36.9 years. 23.7% of residents were under the age of 18 and 13.1% of residents were 65 years of age or older. For every 100 females there were 97.0 males, and for every 100 females age 18 and over there were 96.1 males age 18 and over.

96.1% of residents lived in urban areas, while 3.9% lived in rural areas.

There were 741 households in South Roxana, of which 32.9% had children under the age of 18 living in them. Of all households, 36.0% were married-couple households, 22.9% were households with a male householder and no spouse or partner present, and 29.3% were households with a female householder and no spouse or partner present. About 27.6% of all households were made up of individuals and 8.6% had someone living alone who was 65 years of age or older.

There were 834 housing units, of which 11.2% were vacant. The homeowner vacancy rate was 4.0% and the rental vacancy rate was 5.2%.

Racial composition as of the 2020 census
Race	Number	Percent
White	1,659	87.7%
Black or African American	84	4.4%
American Indian and Alaska Native	9	0.5%
Asian	8	0.4%
Native Hawaiian and Other Pacific Islander	1	0.1%
Some other race	12	0.6%
Two or more races	118	6.2%
Hispanic or Latino (of any race)	53	2.8%

=== 2000 census ===
At the 2000 census there were 1,888 people, 707 households, and 518 families living in the village. The population density was 1,190.0 inhabitants per square mile (459.5/km^{2}). There were 809 housing units at an average density of 509.9 per square mile (196.9/km^{2}). The racial makeup of the village was 97.67% White, 0.32% African American, 0.42% Native American, 0.21% Asian, 0.11% Pacific Islander, 0.32% from other races, and 0.95% from two or more races. Hispanic or Latino of any race were 0.85%.

Of the 707 households 38.0% had children under the age of 18 living with them, 53.2% were married couples living together, 15.3% had a female householder with no husband present, and 26.6% were non-families. 20.1% of households were one person and 8.5% were one person aged 65 or older. The average household size was 2.67 and the average family size was 3.08.

The age distribution was 28.8% under the age of 18, 8.8% from 18 to 24, 30.6% from 25 to 44, 21.6% from 45 to 64, and 10.3% 65 or older. The median age was 34 years. For every 100 females, there were 96.3 males. For every 100 females age 18 and over, there were 94.5 males.

The median household income was $33,295 and the median family income was $37,344. Males had a median income of $34,712 versus $21,552 for females. The per capita income for the village was $14,938. About 17.4% of families and 19.8% of the population were below the poverty line, including 30.3% of those under age 18 and 8.0% of those age 65 or over.
