= Wood River Refinery =

Oil refinery in Roxana, Illinois

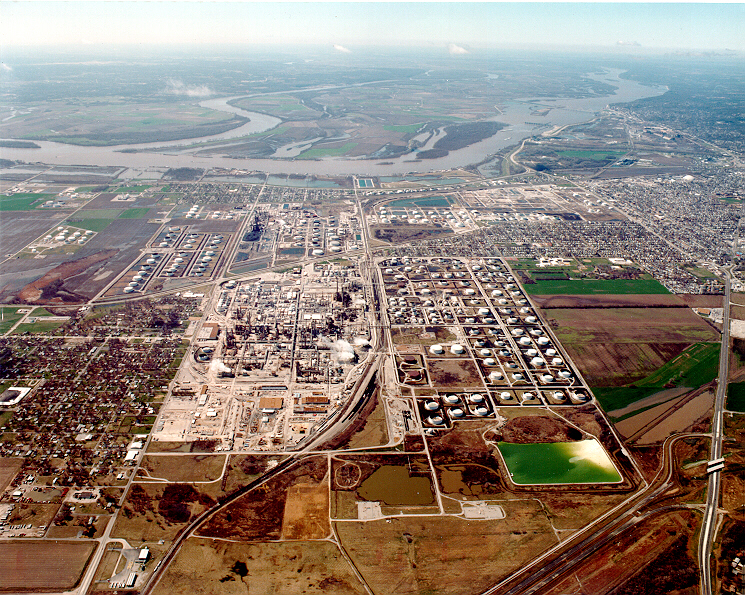
- Wood River Refinery looking west towards the Mississippi River

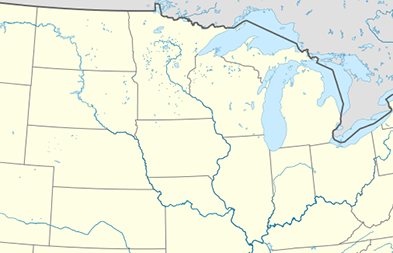
- Location within USA Midwest
- Location: Roxana, Illinois, USA; 38.841°N 90.066°W

Refinery details
- Operator: Phillips 66
- Owners: Phillips 66; Cenovus Energy
- Opened: 1917
- Area: 2,200 acres (890 ha)
- Capacity: 173,000 barrels per day (27,500 m^{3}/d)
- Complexity index: 11.0
- No. of employees: 1,100

The Wood River Refinery is an oil refinery located in Roxana, Illinois, approximately 15 miles (24 km) north of St. Louis, Missouri, on the east side of the Mississippi River. The refinery is currently owned by Phillips 66 and Cenovus Energy and operated by the joint-venture company WRB Refining, LLC (WRB). WRB was formed on 1 July 2007, with Encana taking a 49% interest in Wood River and also Phillips 66's Borger refinery. Encana subsequently spun off oil sands producer Cenovus and ConocoPhillips spun off Phillips 66. In return for a 49% stake in the refinery, ConocoPhillips gained a joint interest in two Alberta oil sands (bitumen) heavy oil projects: Christina Lake (Alberta) and Foster Creek. ConocoPhillips’ interest was sold to Cenovus in May 2017, leaving Cenovus as the sole owner of the assets.

The complex is capable of refining 173,000 barrels (27,500 m^{3}) of crude oil per day. Oil is supplied from the GoM, Canada, and domestic sources through pipelines. The facility produces 85,000 barrels per day (13,500 m^{3}/d) of gasoline along with 70,000 barrels per day (11,000 m^{3}/d) of distillates (diesel and aviation fuel), along with petrochemical feedstocks, asphalt, and coke.

A new four-drum coker unit, part of Wood River Refinery's Coker and Refinery Expansion (CORE) was completed in November 2011. The new coker has a capacity of 75,000 barrels per day and is expected to expand the capacity to handle the bitumen from the Alberta oil sands by nearly 700%. The new Wood River coker's processing capacity is approximately 200,000 - 220,000 barrels per day. The CORE project took about three years to build, with a total cost of US $3.8 billion (US $1.9 billion to Cenovus), and has increased clean product yield by 5% to approximately 85%. The expansion was undertaken specifically to handle heavy oil imported from Alberta. The refined transportation fuels products are destined for the U.S. Midwest market, including St. Louis and Chicago.

An RO filtration system upgrade to treat boiler water was also completed in 2011. 3500 total feet of pipe on 800 feet of modular pipe rack was installed along movable trailers containing the filtration system. This expansion increased the amount of steam available to the refinery. Thermal cracking, stripping and power generation are some of the major processes within a refinery that use steam.

Wood River Refinery was originally built by Shell in 1917. In the late 1990s, Shell and Texaco merged their downstream segments to form the Motiva (with Saudi national oil company Saudi Aramco) and Equilon joint ventures. During a prolonged period of low refining profit margins, Equilon sold the refinery to Tosco in 2003. Shortly thereafter, Phillips Petroleum acquired Tosco. When Conoco and Phillips merged, the refinery became an asset of ConocoPhillips.
