= Illinois Route 255 =

State highway in Madison County, Illinois, US

Illinois Route 255
- Alton Bypass
- IL 255 highlighted in red

Route information
- Maintained by IDOT
- Length: 23.3 mi (37.5 km)
- Existed: October 1998–present

Major junctions
- South end: I-255 / I-270 in Pontoon Beach
- North end: US 67 in Godfrey

Location
- Country: United States
- State: Illinois
- Counties: Madison

Highway system
- Illinois State Highway System; Interstate; US; State; Tollways; Scenic
← I-255	→ IL 267

Illinois Route 255 (IL 255), also referred to as the Alton Bypass, is a northwesterly extension of Interstate 255 (I-255) in southwestern Illinois in the St. Louis metropolitan area. IL 255 starts at I-270 in Pontoon Beach and ends at U.S. Route 67 (US 67) in Godfrey, at a total length of approximately 23.3 miles (37.5 km). It was constructed in four segments opening from 1998 to 2012 at a total cost of $165.2 million.

== Route description ==
IL 255 is a four-lane, limited-access freeway for its entire length. It serves as an important circumferential artery for the northeastern portion of the St. Louis metropolitan area. The final segment—4.3 miles (6.9 km) from Seminary Road to US 67 in Godfrey, just north of the intersection of US 67 and Montclaire Avenue (IL 267/IL 111)—was opened on November 23, 2012. The highway passes just to the west of the St. Louis Regional Airport and Southern Illinois University Edwardsville.

Although IL 255 was designed to federal Interstate Highway standards, it was built by the Illinois Department of Transportation (IDOT) using state-provided funds.

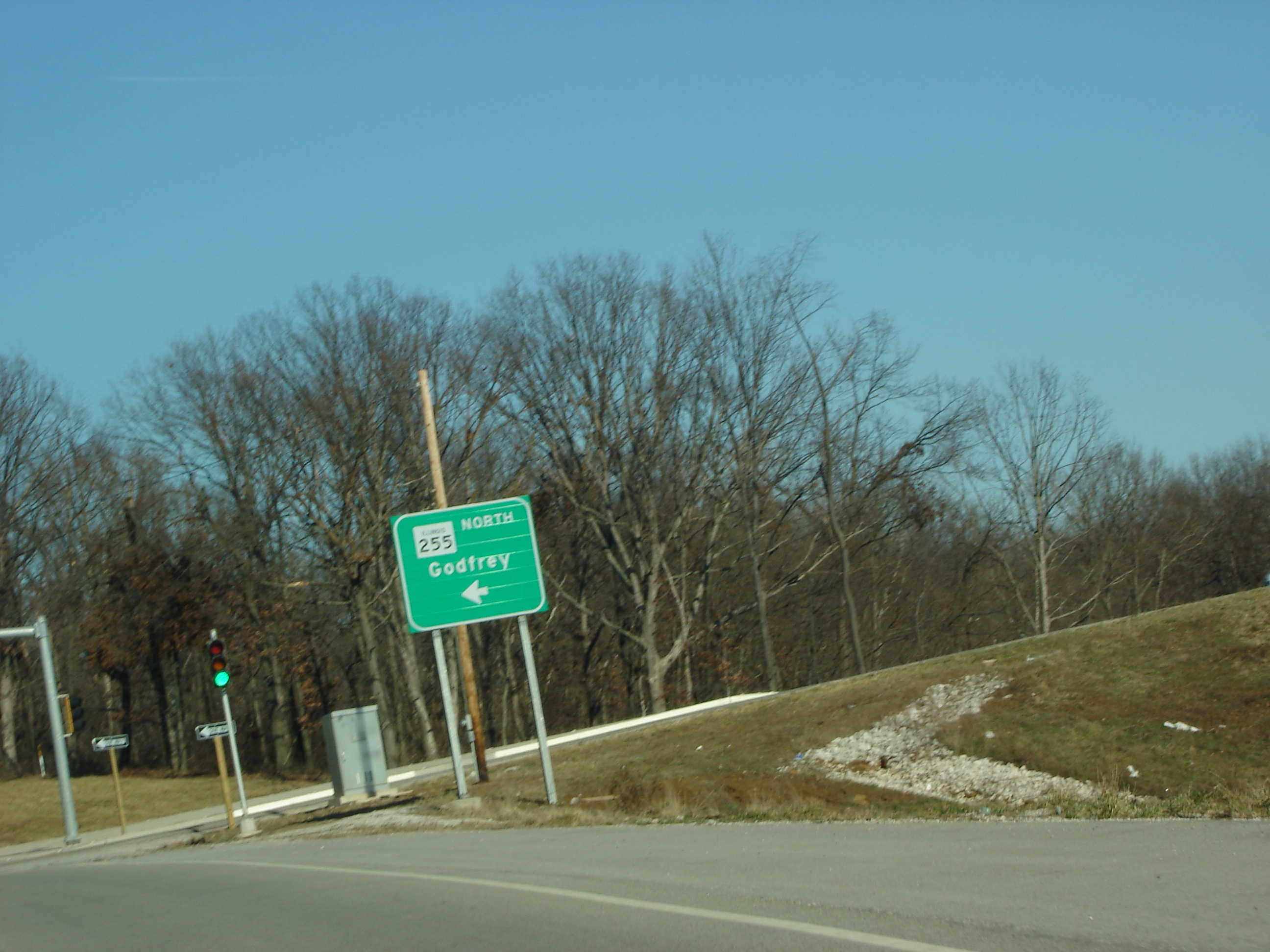
Control city from IL 111

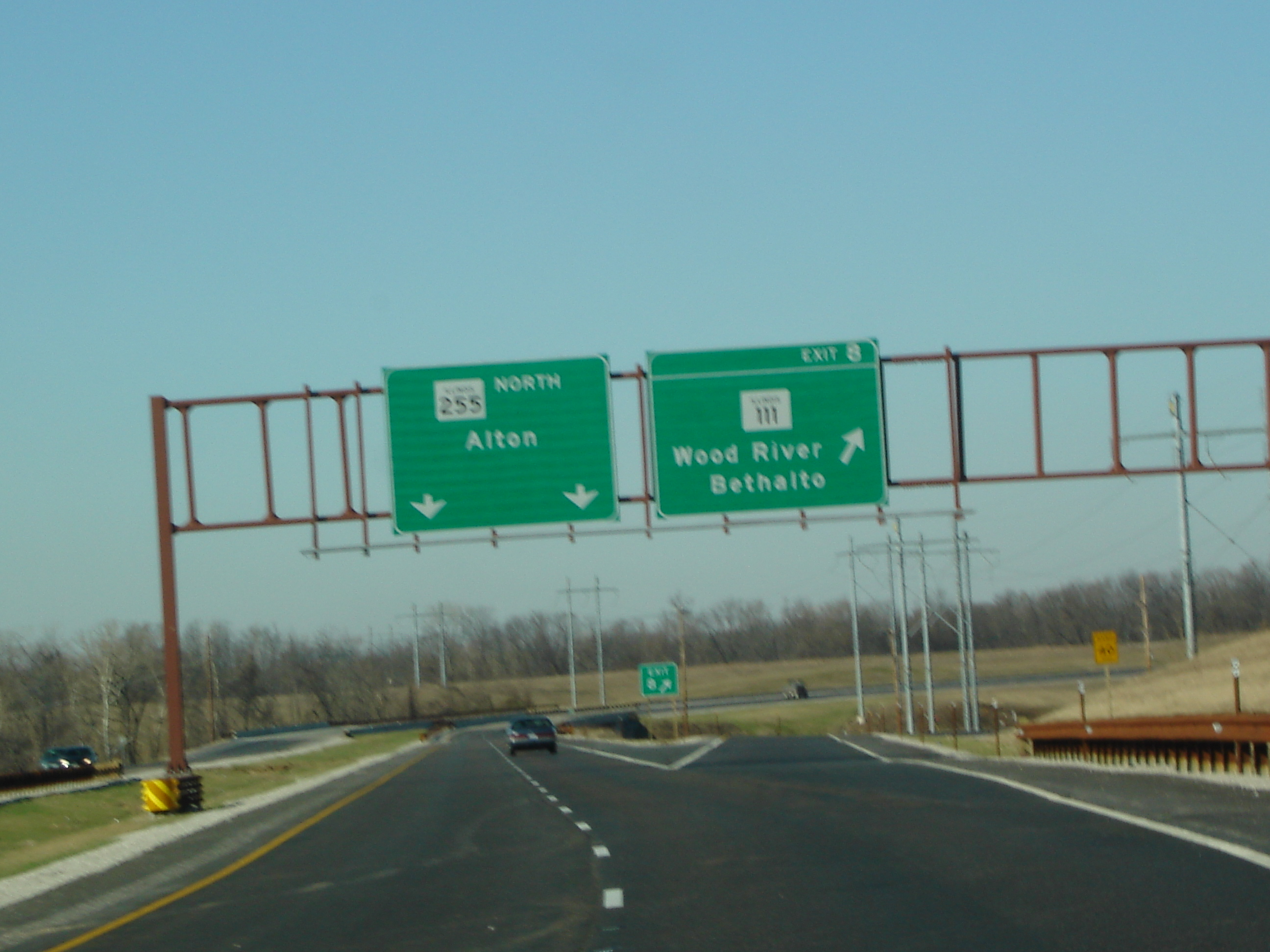
Northbound at IL 111 (exit 8)

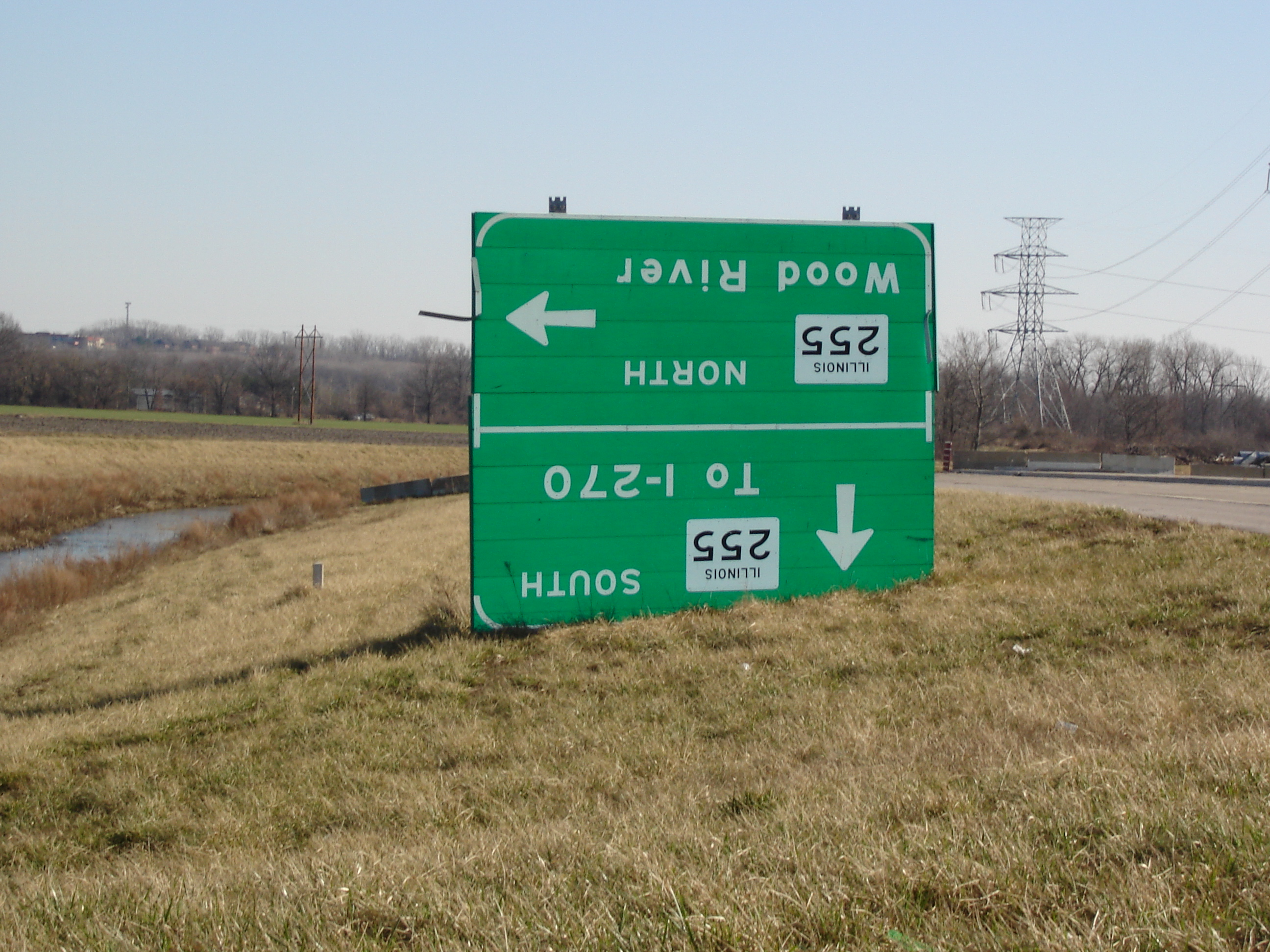
Damaged signs off exit 2, which has since been removed

== History ==
Described as "the Road to Prosperity" by business leaders and government officials who initially proposed it in the late 1970s, IL 255 was part of a region-wide effort to create a high-speed alternative to US 67 over the Clark Bridge through the city-center of Alton, and to two congested local routes (IL 3 and IL 111) that roughly parallel the IL 255 corridor. Although it was part of the much larger Corridor 413 plan, the local politicians focused mostly on the segment from I-270 to what was then IL 267 north of the Godfrey "Y" intersection. At that time, the Berm Highway, the Beltline extension, and the Madison Avenue connector were not built and both IL 3 and IL 111 were over capacity between Alton and I-270. In 1975, a six-month detour related with the closing of the Old Clark Bridge exposed the need for the Alton Bypass along with the other three routes. However, until 1985, the Alton Bypass was a low priority, as other local road projects in the area were considered more important.

The roadway was constructed in four segments opening from 1998 to 2012 at a total cost of $165.2 million. The first 6.5-mile (10.5 km) segment, from I-270 to IL 143, was completed in October 1998 at the cost of $40 million (excluding land acquisition). The second segment, a 7.2-mile (11.6 km) extension from IL 143 to Fosterburg Road was constructed for $78.1 million and opened on October 20, 2006, approximately one year behind schedule, owing to the 2005 collapse of the Wisconsin-based construction company that held the contracts for that portion of the roadway. The $25.1 million third segment opened on August 22, 2008 and extended the road from Fosterburg Road to Seminary Road. The fourth and final segment opened on November 23, 2012 and extended the road 4.3 miles (6.9 km) from Seminary Road to US 67 in Godfrey, just north of the intersection of US 67 and Montclaire Avenue (IL 267/IL 111) at a cost of $22 million.

== Exit list ==
The entire route is in Madison County.

Location	mi	km	Exit	Destinations	Notes
Pontoon Beach	0.00	0.00	30	I-270 – Kansas City, Indianapolis I-255 south – Memphis	Southern terminus; exit number based on I-255 mileage; I-270 west exit 7B, east exit 7; roadway continues as I-255
Edwardsville	1.10	1.77	2	Gateway Commerce Center Drive	
Edwardsville	2.98	4.80	3	New Poag Road	Serves Southern Illinois University Edwardsville
Roxana	5.23	8.42	5	Madison Avenue – South Roxana	
Roxana	6.50	10.46	6	IL 143 – Edwardsville, Wood River	
Wood River	8.04	12.94	8	IL 111 – Wood River, Bethalto	
Bethalto	10.31	16.59	10	IL 111 / IL 140 – Alton, Bethalto	SPUI interchange
	13.49	21.71	13	Fosterburg Road	
	16.41	26.41	16	Seminary Road	
Godfrey			19	Humbert Road	
Godfrey			20	IL 111 / IL 267 – Godfrey	
Godfrey	23.3	37.5		US 67 north – Jacksonville	Northern terminus; northbound exit and southbound entrance; no access to southbound US 67 or from northbound US 67
1.000 mi = 1.609 km; 1.000 km = 0.621 mi: Incomplete access
