= Steve Davis (politician) =

American politician

Steve Davis (born September 22, 1949) was an American politician.

Born in Alton, Illinois, Davis served in the United States Army Reserves. He went to the Lewis and Clark Community College and to the Southern Illinois University Edwardsville; he majored in engineering. Davis lives in Bethalto, Illinois with his wife, Carol, and family. Davis served in the Illinois House of Representatives as a Democrat from 1995 until his resignation in December 2004. Davis resigned from the Illinois General Assembly because of ill health. Davis is retired now and is living a happy life.
