= Fosterburg, Illinois =

- Unincorporated community
- Location within Illinois Location within the United States
- Coordinates: 38°58′18″N 90°04′30″W
- Country: United States
- State: Illinois
- County: Madison
- Elevation: 581 ft (177 m)
- Time zone: UTC-6 (Central (CST))
  - Summer (DST): UTC-5 (CDT)
- Area code: 618
- GNIS feature ID: 408575

Fosterburg (also Fosterburgh) is an unincorporated community in Madison County, Illinois, United States.

== History ==
Oliver P. and Lucinda Foster recorded the plat for the original four-block town of Foster on October 12, 1857. It was renamed Fosterburg in 1858 after a post office application found that another Illinois post office already used the name Foster.
