= East Alton, Illinois =

- Village
- Flag

- Location in Madison County, Illinois
- Coordinates: 38°52′40″N 90°07′22″W
- Country: United States
- State: Illinois
- County: Madison
- Township: Wood River

Area
  - Total: 5.47 sq mi (14.18 km^{2})
  - Land: 5.32 sq mi (13.77 km^{2})
  - Water: 0.16 sq mi (0.41 km^{2})
- Elevation: 443 ft (135 m)

Population (2020)
  - Total: 5,786
  - Density: 1,087.9/sq mi (420.05/km^{2})
- Time zone: UTC-6 (CST)
  - Summer (DST): UTC-5 (CDT)
- ZIP code: 62024
- Area code: 618
- FIPS code: 17-21553
- GNIS ID: 2398769
- Website: villageofeastaltonil.gov

East Alton is a village in Madison County, Illinois, United States. The population was 5,786 at the 2020 census, down from 6,301 in 2010.

== History ==
East Alton was incorporated as a village in 1893 (some say 1894).

William Cobb, namesake of Cobb Street, was one of the first mayors, from 1895 to 1896, and again in 1902–1905.

Like many River Bend communities, the town dates back to when European settlers came to the area in the early 19th century. And it wasn't always East Alton — the community was known as Emerald, Milton Settlement and Alton Junction. Alton Junction was also known as Wann Junction, famous locally for being the site of a horrific rail disaster.

== Geography ==
East Alton is located in northwestern Madison County. It is bordered to the northwest by the city of Alton, to the east by unincorporated Rosewood Heights, to the southeast by the city of Wood River, and to the southwest by the Mississippi River, with West Alton, Missouri, on the opposite shore.

According to the 2021 census gazetteer files, East Alton has a total area of 5.48 square miles (14.19 km^{2}), of which 5.32 square miles (13.78 km^{2}) (or 97.13%) is land and 0.16 square miles (0.41 km^{2}) (or 2.87%) is water. The Wood River flows through the northern and western parts of the village and forms the village's western border (with Alton) for some of its distance. The river joins the Mississippi in the southern part of the village.

IL 3 passes through the southwest part of the village, leading northwest into Alton and south 21 miles (34 km) to East St. Louis. IL 143 follows the Mississippi along the village's southern edge, leading northwest to the center of Alton and east to the center of Wood River. Illinois Routes 111 and 140 run together along the northern border of the village, leading west into Alton and east into Bethalto.

== Demographics ==
Historical population
Census	Pop.	Note	%±
1900	454		—
1910	584		28.6%
1920	1,669		185.8%
1930	4,502		169.7%
1940	4,680		4.0%
1950	7,290		55.8%
1960	7,630		4.7%
1970	7,309		−4.2%
1980	7,096		−2.9%
1990	7,063		−0.5%
2000	6,830		−3.3%
2010	6,301		−7.7%
2020	5,786		−8.2%
U.S. Decennial Census

As of the 2020 census there were 5,786 people, 2,548 households, and 1,520 families residing in the village. The population density was 1,056.80 inhabitants per square mile (408.03/km^{2}). There were 2,885 housing units at an average density of 526.94 per square mile (203.45/km^{2}), of which 10.3% were vacant. The homeowner vacancy rate was 3.9% and the rental vacancy rate was 8.1%. The racial makeup of the village was 85.40% White, 6.41% African American, 0.45% Native American, 0.45% Asian, 0.07% Pacific Islander, 0.55% from other races, and 6.67% from two or more races. Hispanic or Latino of any race were 2.11% of the population.

There were 2,548 households, out of which 31.2% had children under the age of 18 living with them, 45.25% were married couples living together, 5.77% had a female householder with no husband present, and 40.35% were non-families. 32.42% of all households were made up of individuals, and 15.03% had someone living alone who was 65 years of age or older. The average household size was 2.91 and the average family size was 2.36.

The village's age distribution consisted of 21.0% under the age of 18, 8.4% from 18 to 24, 22.7% from 25 to 44, 32.5% from 45 to 64, and 15.4% who were 65 years of age or older. The median age was 43.8 years. For every 100 females, there were 115.3 males. For every 100 females age 18 and over, there were 117.6 males.

The median income for a household in the village was $52,773, and the median income for a family was $58,669. Males had a median income of $41,250 versus $32,511 for females. The per capita income for the village was $26,761. About 9.1% of families and 16.5% of the population were below the poverty line, including 33.4% of those under age 18 and 11.1% of those age 65 or over.

As of the 2020 census, East Alton had a population of 5,786. The median age was 40.0 years. 20.6% of residents were under the age of 18 and 16.9% of residents were 65 years of age or older. For every 100 females there were 97.5 males, and for every 100 females age 18 and over there were 97.8 males age 18 and over.

100.0% of residents lived in urban areas, while 0.0% lived in rural areas.

Racial composition as of the 2020 census
Race	Number	Percent
White	4,941	85.4%
Black or African American	371	6.4%
American Indian and Alaska Native	26	0.4%
Asian	26	0.4%
Native Hawaiian and Other Pacific Islander	4	0.1%
Some other race	32	0.6%
Two or more races	386	6.7%
Hispanic or Latino (of any race)	122	2.1%

== Industry ==
East Alton is home to the Olin Corporation, a manufacturer of ammunition. Olin has a major impact on East Alton and its surrounding communities. A part of town called the Defense Area was built during the 1940s and until recently was used for low income housing. Replacing the Defense Area is Emerald Ridge, which consists of 46 new single-family homes. The impact of Olin had spread into town sports: East Alton Middle School's athletic teams were originally named the Bullets.

The EPA was overseeing the cleanup of an Olin Corp. facility in East Alton by 2021, taking public comments on Olin's proposed cleanup plan to contaminated soil and groundwater in July 2021.

== Education ==
East Alton School District 13 and East Alton-Wood River Community High School District 14 cover most of the village, while a small section in the north is in the Bethalto Consolidated Unit School District 8, and a small section in the southwest is in the Alton Community Unit School District 11.

== Points of interest ==
East Alton is located in the Greater Metropolitan area of St. Louis, Missouri. Thus, all the attractions and facilities of that major city are equally available to residents of East Alton and nearby communities. Additionally, East Alton is minutes away from the origination point of the Journey of Discovery (Lewis and Clark Expedition) located in nearby Hartford, Illinois. Educational institutions in the area include Southern Illinois University Edwardsville, the SIUE Dental School in Alton, Principia College in Elsah and Lewis and Clark Community College in Godfrey.

Van Preter Park is the main park in East Alton. This 13.8-acre (5.6 ha) park consists of four baseball diamonds, two playground units, two small pavilions and one large pavilion.

Bill Tite Memorial - Lions Park is located on the north side of the Keasler Recreation Complex. The entrance is in the 300 block of Ohio Street. This park consists of a large playground unit, two swing set units with toddler seats, a climbing unit, see-saw rider, two large multiple play stations, picnic tables, park benches, barbecue grills, and green space. The park underwent improvements in late 2015.

The East Alton Post Office contains a mural, The Letter, painted in 1937 by Frances Foy. Murals were produced from 1934 to 1943 in the United States through the Section of Painting and Sculpture, later called the Section of Fine Arts, of the Treasury Department.

The East Alton History Museum officially opened on March 4, 2017, and is located in the Fred H. Bright Jr. Vital Services Building, 119 N. Main Street. The building, which houses the East Alton Police department, was renamed the same day in honor of the former Mayor.

== Notable people ==
- Joe Astroth, catcher for the Athletics when they were based in Philadelphia and Kansas City
- Fred Olsen invented the ball propellant manufacturing process here.
- Jayden Ulrich, 2024 Paris Olympian-Discus Throw

== See also ==
- Melvin Price Locks and Dam on the Mississippi River at East Alton
