= Bethalto Community Unit School District 8 =

School district in Illinois, United States

Location
- Bethalto, Moro, Meadowbrook, Cottage Hills, Surrounding Areas United States

District information
- Type: Public
- Motto: Focusing on the Vision “Achievement for All”
- Established: 1951
- Superintendent: Dr. Jill Griffin
- Budget: $22 Million

Students and staff
- Students: 2555
- Teachers: 190

Other information
- Teachers' unions: Bethalto Education Association, Illinois Education Association, National Education Association
- Website: www.bethalto.org

Bethalto Community Unit School District 8 is a unified school district based in the Madison County village of Bethalto, Illinois; the district is on the outskirts of the St. Louis Metro Area. The district is composed of five schools, of which all are located in the village of Bethalto except for one. The district is composed of two primary schools, one intermediate schools, one middle school, and one high school. Students attending the unified school district begin their educations at Bethalto East Primary School which serves grades Pre-Kindergarten through first grade. Next, students attend Parkside Primary School, which serve students in grades second and third; the principals of each school are, respectively, Rachel Leckrone and Aaron Kilpatrick. Students in grades four and five attend Meadowbrook Intermediate School, which was headed by principal Kim Wilks until 2024. Meadowbrook Intermediate School, falls outside Bethalto city limits in nearby Fort Russell Township. Graduates of the intermediate school register at Wilbur Trimpe Middle School, where under direction of Principal Laura Gipson , the students progress from grade six through grade eight. The last leg of pre-collegiate education that students in Bethalto Community Unit School District 8 undertake is at Civic Memorial High School, where the school's principal is Justin Newell. The high school mascot is the Eagle, The middle school mascot is also the Eagle.

Civic Memorial High School is home to four clubs (including a student council), There also are teams covering eleven separate sports. Civic Memorial High School also produces a drama program, producing a fall play and spring musical every year.
