= Wood River Township, Madison County, Illinois =

Wood River Township
- Township

- Location of Illinois in the United States
- Coordinates: 38°52′33″N 90°05′01″W
- Country: United States
- State: Illinois
- County: Madison
- Settled: November 2, 1875

Area
  - Total: 26.22 sq mi (67.9 km^{2})
  - Land: 24.84 sq mi (64.3 km^{2})
  - Water: 1.38 sq mi (3.6 km^{2})
- Elevation: 443 ft (135 m)

Population (2010)
  - Estimate (2016): 30,681
  - Density: 1,269.5/sq mi (490.2/km^{2})
- Time zone: UTC-6 (CST)
  - Summer (DST): UTC-5 (CDT)
- FIPS code: 17-119-83284
- Website: woodrivertownship.com

Wood River Township is located in Madison County, Illinois, in the United States. As of the 2010 census, its population was 31,537 and it contained 14,226 housing units. It contains the census-designated place of Rosewood Heights.

== Geography ==
According to the 2010 census, the township has a total area of 26.22 square miles (67.9 km^{2}), of which 24.84 square miles (64.3 km^{2}) (or 94.74%) is land and 1.38 square miles (3.6 km^{2}) (or 5.26%) is water.

== Demographics ==
Historical population
Census	Pop.	Note	%±
2016 (est.)	30,681
U.S. Decennial Census
