= Bethalto, Illinois =

Village in the metropolitan area of St. Louis, Missouri

- Village
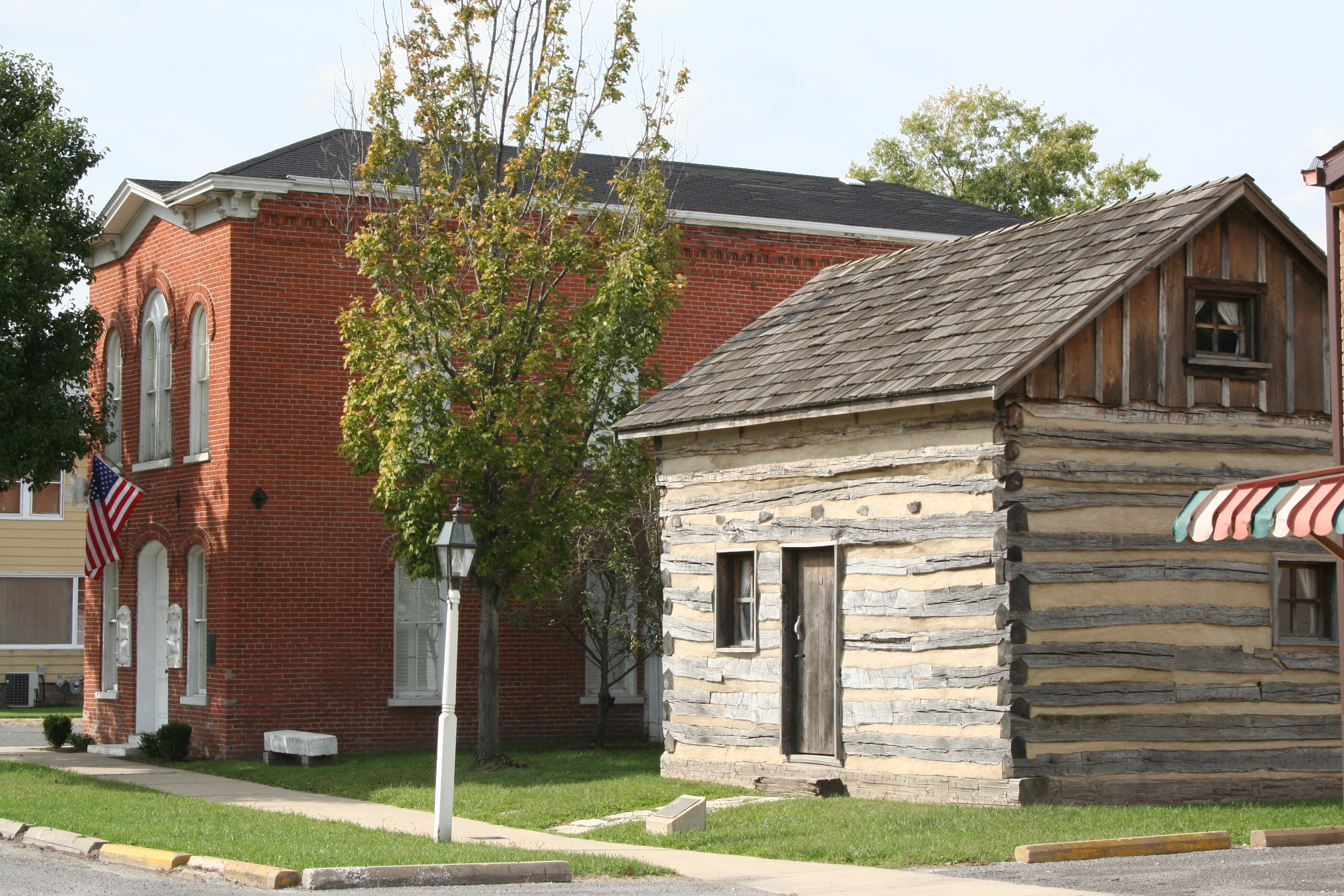
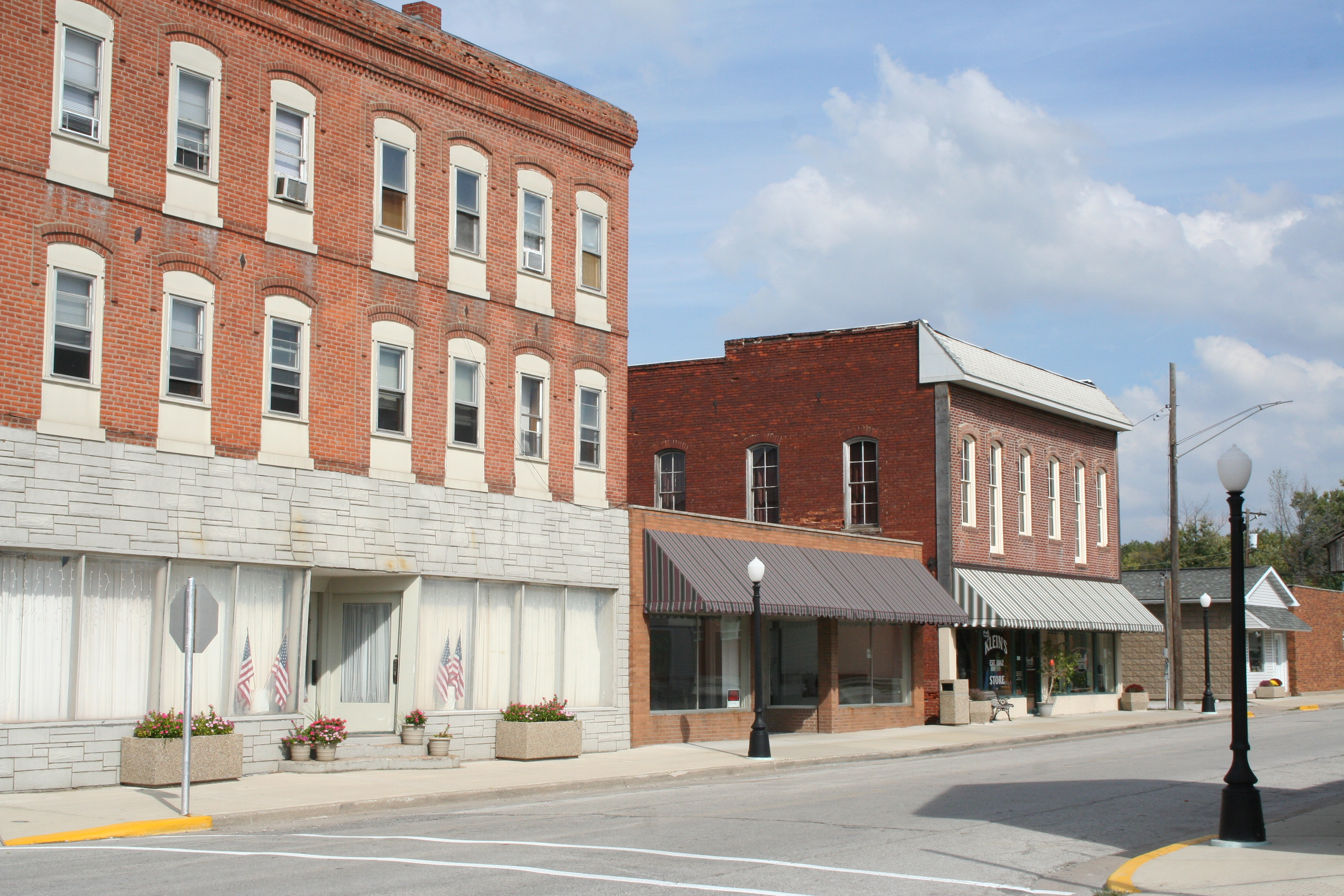
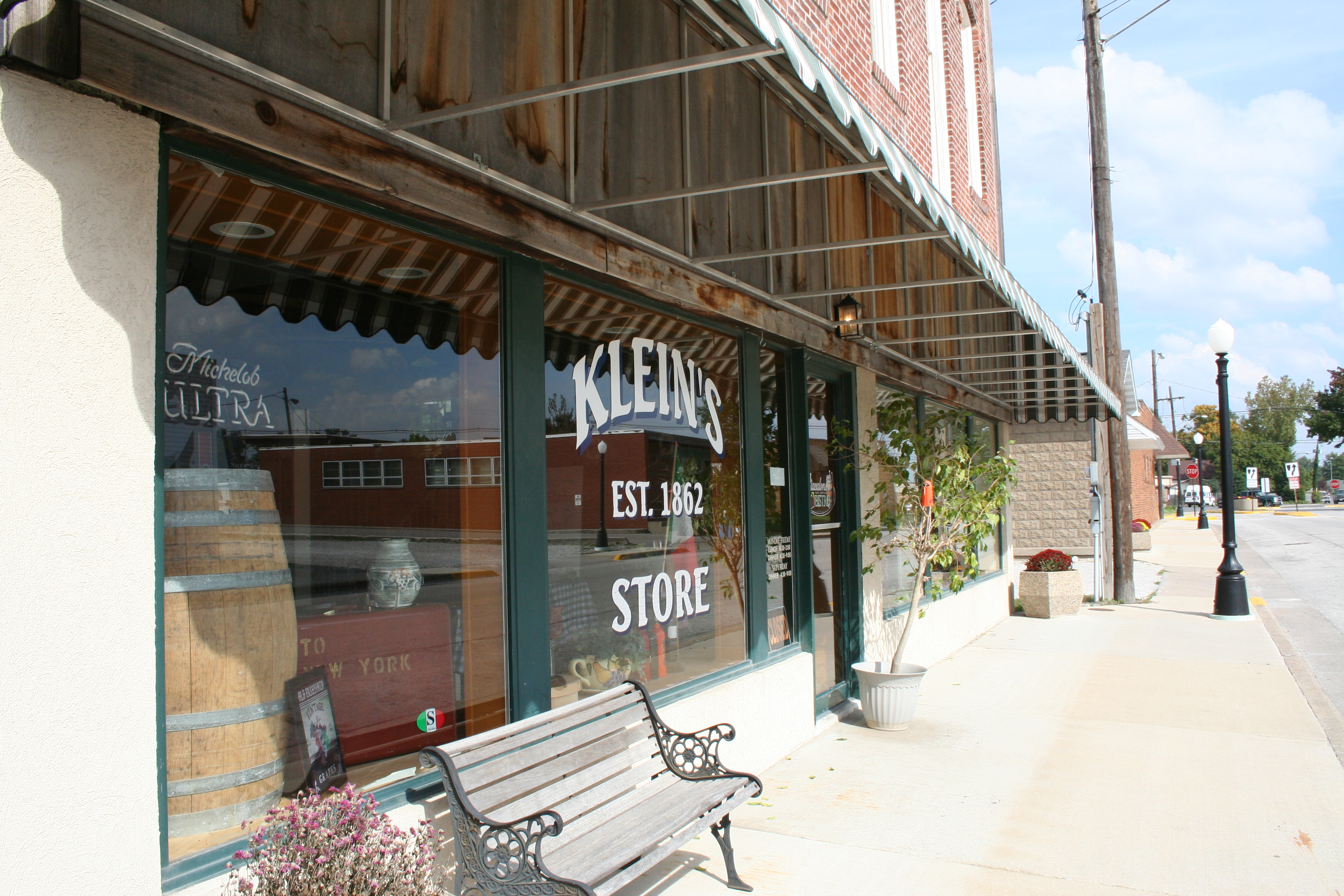
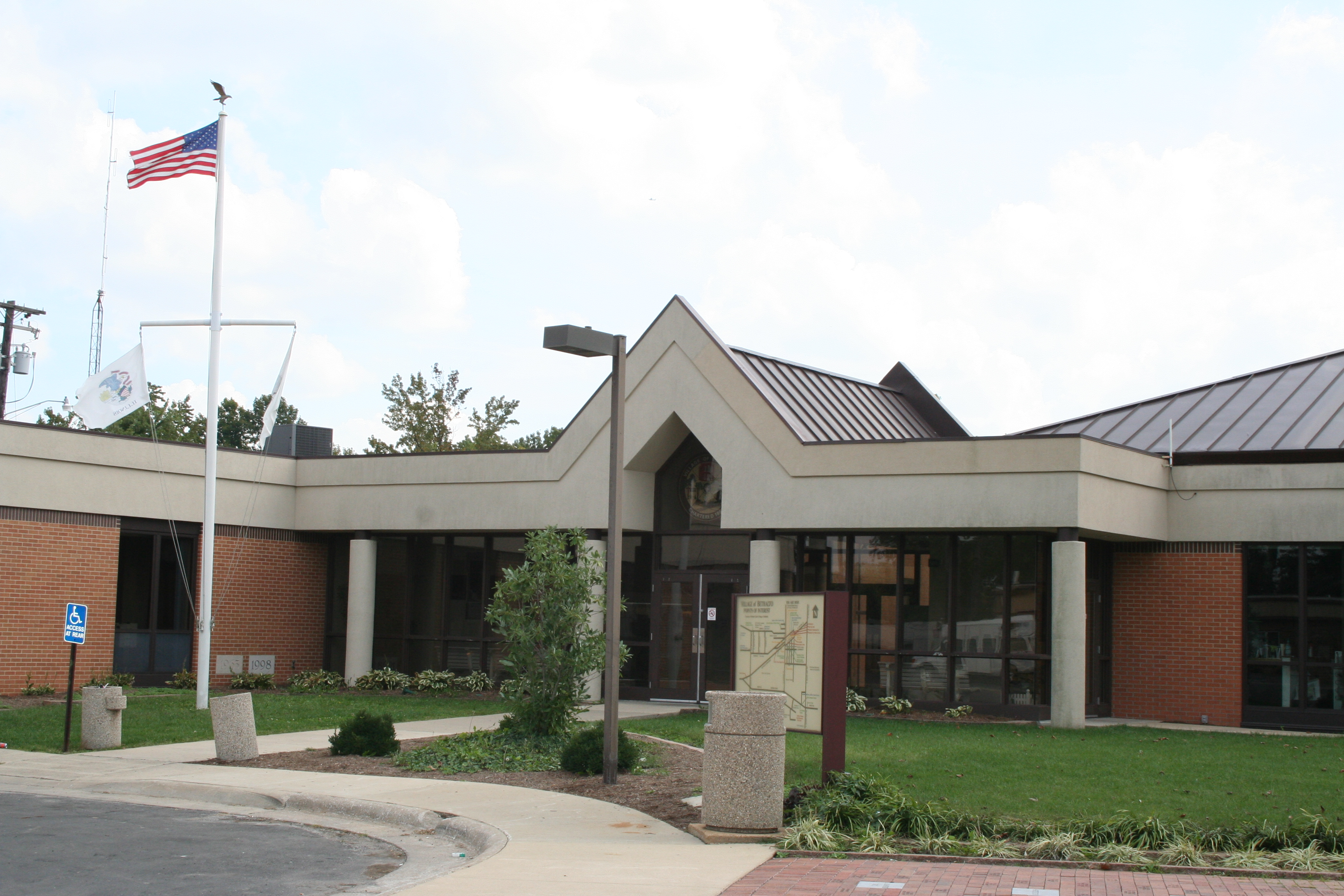
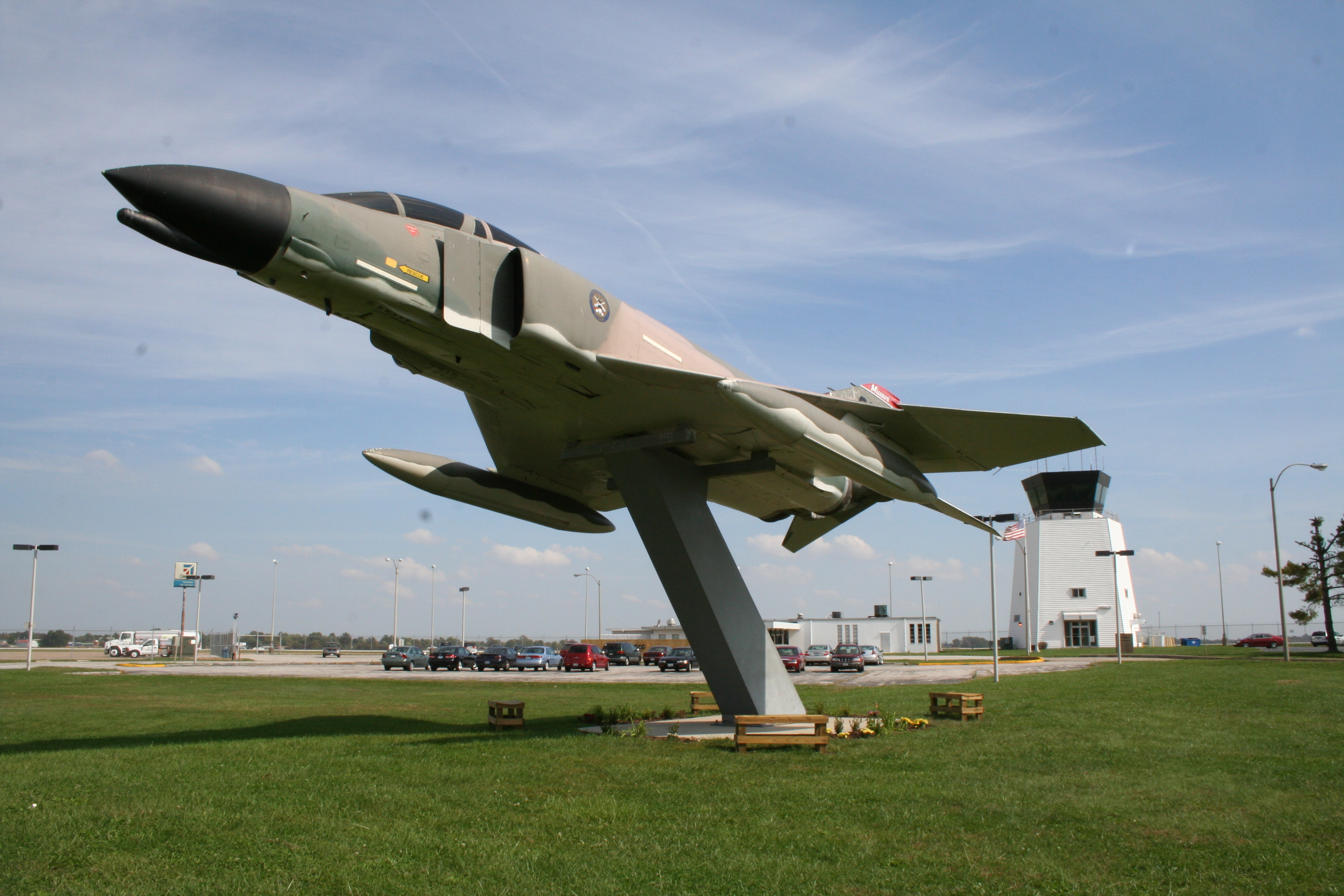
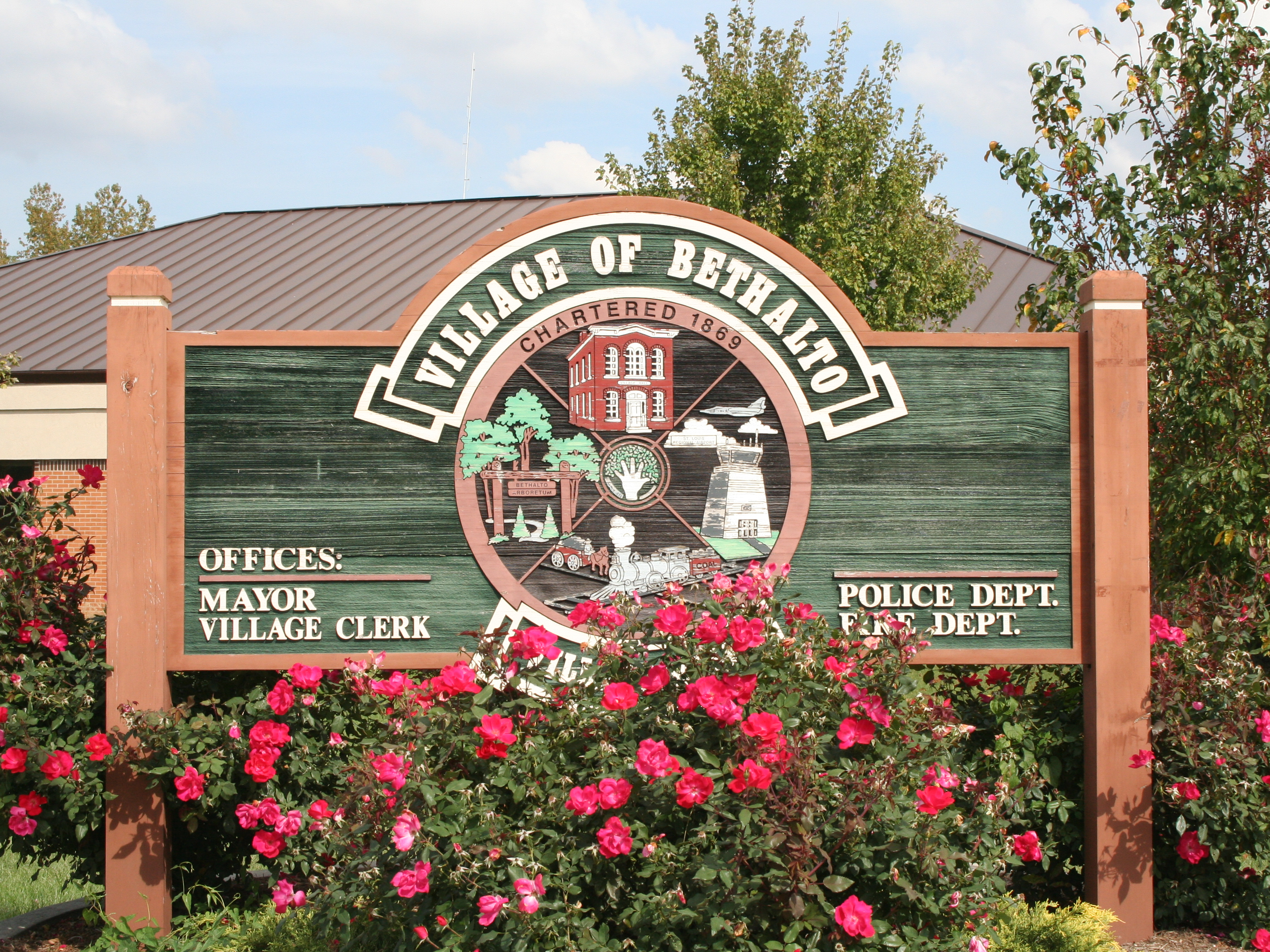
- From top, left to right: Old Bethalto Village Hall and log cabin, Old Downtown, Historic Klein's Store, the current Village Hall, St. Louis Regional Airport, and the Bethalto sign outside Village Hall

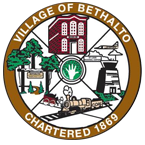
- Seal
- Motto: Home of the Eagles
- Location in Madison County, Illinois
- Coordinates: 38°53′10″N 90°02′25″W
- Country: United States
- State: Illinois
- County: Madison
- Townships: Wood River; Fort Russell; Foster
- Established: 1834

Government
  - Mayor: Gary Bost

Area
  - Total: 7.64 sq mi (19.79 km^{2})
  - Land: 7.59 sq mi (19.66 km^{2})
  - Water: 0.050 sq mi (0.13 km^{2})
- Elevation: 532 ft (162 m)

Population (2020)
  - Total: 9,310
  - Density: 1,226.4/sq mi (473.52/km^{2})
- Time zone: UTC-6 (CST)
  - Summer (DST): UTC-5 (CDT)
- ZIP code: 62010
- Area code: 618
- FIPS code: 17-05599
- GNIS feature ID: 2398108
- Website: www.bethalto.com

Bethalto is a village in Madison County, Illinois, United States. Bethalto, like the rest of Madison County, is part of the Illinois Metro East portion of the Greater St. Louis metropolitan area.

Early in its history, the village was a railway town along the Terre Haute and Alton Railroad. In the 19th century, industry in the town included milling of grain from local farms and coal mining. In the early 20th century, the railroad was rerouted to go through nearby Edwardsville. By the mid 20th century, the rail industry had pulled out entirely and the village became known as a bedroom town.

At the 2020 census, the population of Bethalto was 9,310.

== History ==
=== Toponymy ===
The name "Bethalto" is commonly believed to be derived from Bethel (the original name of the town) and nearby Alton. The name "Bethel" came from the first church located in the area, with the Post Office Department requiring it to change its name to avoid confusion with the Clay County village of Bethel.

=== Early history ===
Before pioneering American settlers arrived, there were numerous Native Americans in the area, and Kickapoo villages lined nearby Indian Creek. In 1804, a man named Thomas Rattan arrived in the area from Ohio and established the first pioneer settlement, often referred to in those days as "Rattan's Prairie". The town was laid out by Joel U. Starkey, with the town plat being recorded June 23, 1854.

=== Milling industry ===
In the late 1800s, the principal industry of Bethalto was milling. In 1859, the President Mill and Elevator Company was established by James Neimrich. The company was bought, sold and expanded various times over the years, eventually coming into the ownership of John W. Kaufman in 1881. In either 1895 or 1896, the flour mill was destroyed in a fire. Kauffman declined to rebuild the mill, instead opting to purchase the Eagle flour mill of St. Louis. The loss of the mill had a profound impact on the village. In 1890, the population of Bethalto was 879. By 1900, it had fallen to 477 and in 1910 the population of the village was just 447.

=== 1996 plane crash ===
On June 19, 1996, a McDonnell Douglas F/A-18 Hornet crashed into a home, shortly after taking off from St. Louis Regional Airport. The plane originally belonged to the US Navy, but had been leased back to the manufacturer, McDonnell Douglas. A spokesperson for McDonnell Douglass said the pilot had been practicing for an air show the next week in the Czech Republic. One eyewitness stated, "He started doing an outside roll ... and when he got to the top of the roll something went wrong; he stalled or something. He started coming down, and I lost him behind some trees. Then I heard a thump―not an explosion, just a loud thump―and I knew what'd happened."

=== Red Barn ===
A longtime landmark just north of Bethalto was an old barn at the intersection of Culp Lane and Bethalto Road, known to residents as simply "the red barn". On July 26, 2012, the owner of the barn was spraying insecticides inside the barn to kill wasps. After spraying for wasps, the owner left and at some point a fire broke out. Fosterburg, Bethalto and Brighton volunteer fire departments responded to the blaze, but it was too late to save the structure. It was believed the barn had been there for around a hundred years. Often, residents would give directions based on the red barn.

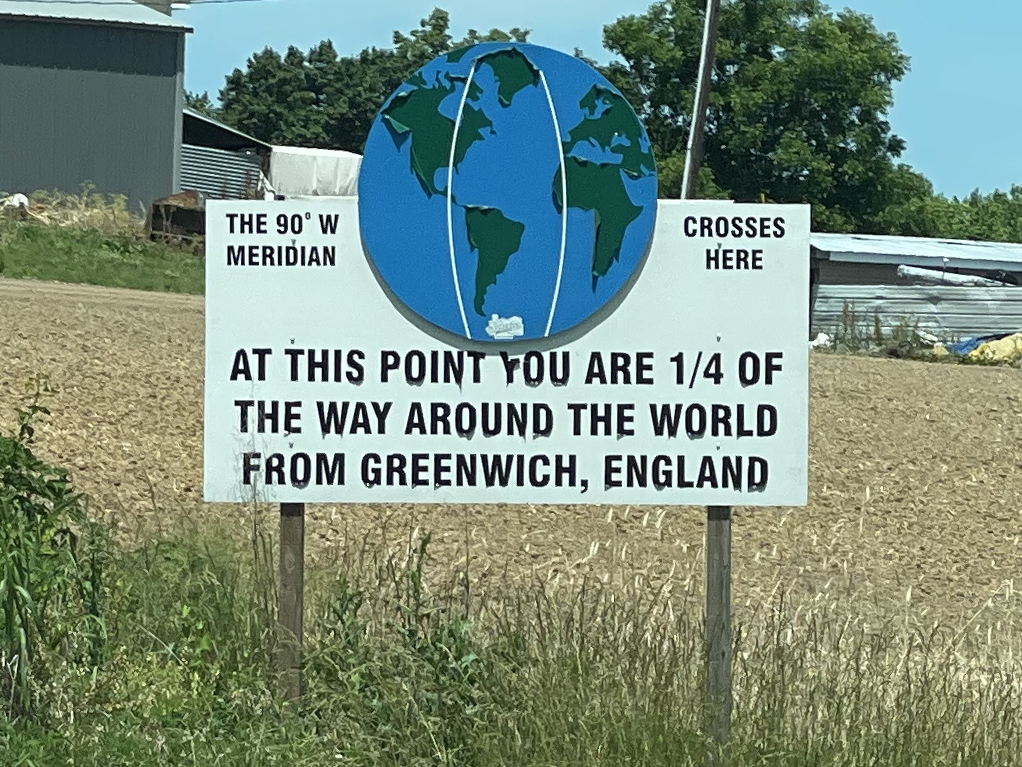
Sign in Meadowbrook, just east of Bethalto, marking 90ºW

== Geography ==
Bethalto is located in northwestern Madison County 9 miles (14 km) east of Alton, 10 miles (16 km) northwest of Edwardsville, the county seat, and 30 miles (48 km) north-northeast of St. Louis.

According to the 2021 census gazetteer files, Bethalto has a total area of 7.64 square miles (19.79 km^{2}), of which 7.59 square miles (19.66 km^{2}) (or 99.37%) is land and 0.05 square miles (0.13 km^{2}) (or 0.63%) is water. Most of the village drains west to the East Fork of the Wood River, a southwest-flowing direct tributary of the Mississippi River. The east part of the village drains east to Indian Creek, a south-flowing tributary of Cahokia Creek, which joins the Mississippi in Hartford.

== Demographics ==
Historical population
Census	Pop.	Note	%±
1880	628		—
1890	879		40.0%
1900	477		−45.7%
1910	447		−6.3%
1920	471		5.4%
1930	687		45.9%
1940	1,207		75.7%
1950	2,115		75.2%
1960	3,235		53.0%
1970	7,074		118.7%
1980	8,630		22.0%
1990	9,507		10.2%
2000	9,454		−0.6%
2010	9,521		0.7%
2020	9,310		−2.2%
U.S. Decennial Census

As of the 2020 census there were 9,310 people, 3,795 households, and 2,567 families residing in the village. The population density was 1,218.75 inhabitants per square mile (470.56/km^{2}). There were 4,531 housing units at an average density of 593.14 per square mile (229.01/km^{2}), of which 9.3% were vacant. The homeowner vacancy rate was 1.6% and the rental vacancy rate was 13.7%. The racial makeup of the village was 91.04% White, 1.80% African American, 0.19% Native American, 0.50% Asian, 0.01% Pacific Islander, 0.97% from other races, and 5.48% from two or more races. Hispanic or Latino of any race were 2.56% of the population.

There were 3,795 households, out of which 36.3% had children under the age of 18 living with them, 53.78% were married couples living together, 10.80% had a female householder with no husband present, and 32.36% were non-families. 25.82% of all households were made up of individuals, and 11.33% had someone living alone who was 65 years of age or older. The average household size was 2.89 and the average family size was 2.42.

The village's age distribution consisted of 23.8% under the age of 18, 3.7% from 18 to 24, 29.2% from 25 to 44, 22.2% from 45 to 64, and 21.0% who were 65 years of age or older. The median age was 40.6 years. For every 100 females, there were 89.6 males. For every 100 females age 18 and over, there were 81.6 males.

The median income for a household in the village was $66,834, and the median income for a family was $77,917. Males had a median income of $54,663 versus $30,913 for females. The per capita income for the village was $32,225. About 3.7% of families and 6.6% of the population were below the poverty line, including 4.4% of those under age 18 and 5.3% of those age 65 or over.

99.3% of residents lived in urban areas, while 0.7% lived in rural areas.

Racial composition as of the 2020 census
Race	Number	Percent
White	8,476	91.0%
Black or African American	168	1.8%
American Indian and Alaska Native	18	0.2%
Asian	47	0.5%
Native Hawaiian and Other Pacific Islander	1	0.0%
Some other race	90	1.0%
Two or more races	510	5.5%
Hispanic or Latino (of any race)	238	2.6%

== Transportation ==
=== Highways ===
Bethalto is connected to the region by several routes. Illinois Route 140 is the main east–west highway running through the village, leading east 10 miles (16 km) to Hamel and west 9 miles (14 km) to Alton. Illinois Route 111 joins with Illinois Route 140 from the south, connecting the village to the rest of the Metro East. It leads south 3.5 miles (5.6 km) to Wood River and west 7 miles (11 km) to the northern part of Alton. In October 2006, Illinois Route 255, a four-lane, controlled-access highway, was extended from Illinois Route 143 in Wood River to Fosterburg Road, passing through the west side of Bethalto. IL 255 leads south 10 miles (16 km) to Interstate 255 in Pontoon Beach, Illinois, connecting Bethalto to the Interstate Highway System, and now leads northwest 9 miles (14 km) to U.S. Route 67 in Godfrey.

=== St. Louis Regional Airport ===
Bethalto is home to St. Louis Regional Airport. Originally called Civic Memorial Airport, St. Louis Regional was founded in 1946 with a ballot measure approving the creation of the Civic Memorial Airport Authority. The airport is home to various services, including West Star Aviation, a fixed-base operator.

== Government ==
Bethalto was incorporated in 1869 under a special charter, and later incorporated again in 1873 under Illinois general law. The village is governed by an elected mayor and a board of village trustees, who are elected at-large.

== Education ==
Public schools in Bethalto are operated by Bethalto Community Unit School District 8, which was founded in 1950 along with Civic Memorial High School. The village is also home to Our Lady Queen of Peace, a Catholic school founded in 1962 under Father Thomas Manning, and a Lutheran school also founded in 1962, Zion Lutheran. Both parochial schools offer kindergarten through eighth grade classes.

== Religious organizations ==
Bethalto is home to a number of religious organizations, consisting of both small and large congregations.

Churches that serve Bethalto are listed here in alphabetical order:

- Assembly of God
- Bethalto United Methodist
- Bethalto United Presbyterian
- Bible Baptist Church
- Church of God
- Church of the Nazarene (IL District Office)
- Cornerstone Church
- Concordia Lutheran
- Cottage Hills Baptist Church
- First Baptist Church
- First Church of God
- First Christian Church
- First Southern Baptist Church
- Grace Community Church
- Heart's Harvest
- Landmark Worship Center
- Lifebrook Church
- New Witness Fellowship
- Meadowbrook Assembly of God
- Metro Presbyterian Church
- Our Lady Queen of Peace
- Riverbend Calvary Chapel
- Lifepoint Church - Bethalto Campus
- St. Paul's United Methodist
- Zion Lutheran

== Parks and recreation ==
=== Central Park ===
Central Park is in the center of the village, behind the current village hall, and sits on 10 1/3 acres of land purchased from New York Central Railroad when the rail line closed in Bethalto. The park consists of a walking path, band stand, lighted tennis courts, baseball fields, and a basketball court. The Bethalto Homecoming is held at the park every year.

=== Bethalto Arboretum ===
Adjacent to Central Park is the Bethalto Arboretum. This arboretum was developed in 1966 on former railroad property, much like Central Park. A directory of trees and bushes contained in the arboretum may be viewed in the mayor's and clerk's offices. There are also many plaques, in memory of Bethalto's notable persons, placed next to many of the trees in the park. A set of rail wheels on top of a short slab of railroad track lie in the center of the park. The short piece of track remains in its original position as part of the old railroad tracks that existed to transport coal to and from the area. In April 2021, the arboretum was recognized with ArbNet accreditation. A time capsule was buried at the dedication ceremony, and a commemorative plaque sits at the entrance.

=== Steve Bryant Park ===
Known as "Culp Lane Park" until 2014, Bryant Park is on the northwest end of town. Features include a fishing lake, a children's play area, walking paths, pavilions, a playground, and stretches of attractive landscaping. The park was named for former mayor Steve Bryant, who was instrumental in transforming the town lagoon into a family park.

=== Bethalto Sports Complex ===
The Bethalto Sports Complex is located on the north side of town just off Culp Lane. The complex was completed in 2006 and is made up of two baseball fields, two softball fields, two soccer fields, a grandstand, and a concession stand. The complex, which is maintained by the Village of Bethalto, replaced the old baseball and soccer fields located at Civic Memorial High School for varsity and junior varsity baseball, softball and soccer teams. The Indians, the Bethalto Legion team, also calls the complex home.

=== Southside Park ===
Southside Park (sometimes referred to as the "Field of Dreams") is located on the south side of town in the Chateaux residential area. The complex consists of four lighted diamonds with a concession stand in the center. The fields are primarily set up to handle all of the local Boys & Girls Clubs of America youth baseball and softball games. The fields are also home to a number of private and select league baseball teams that play there every summer.

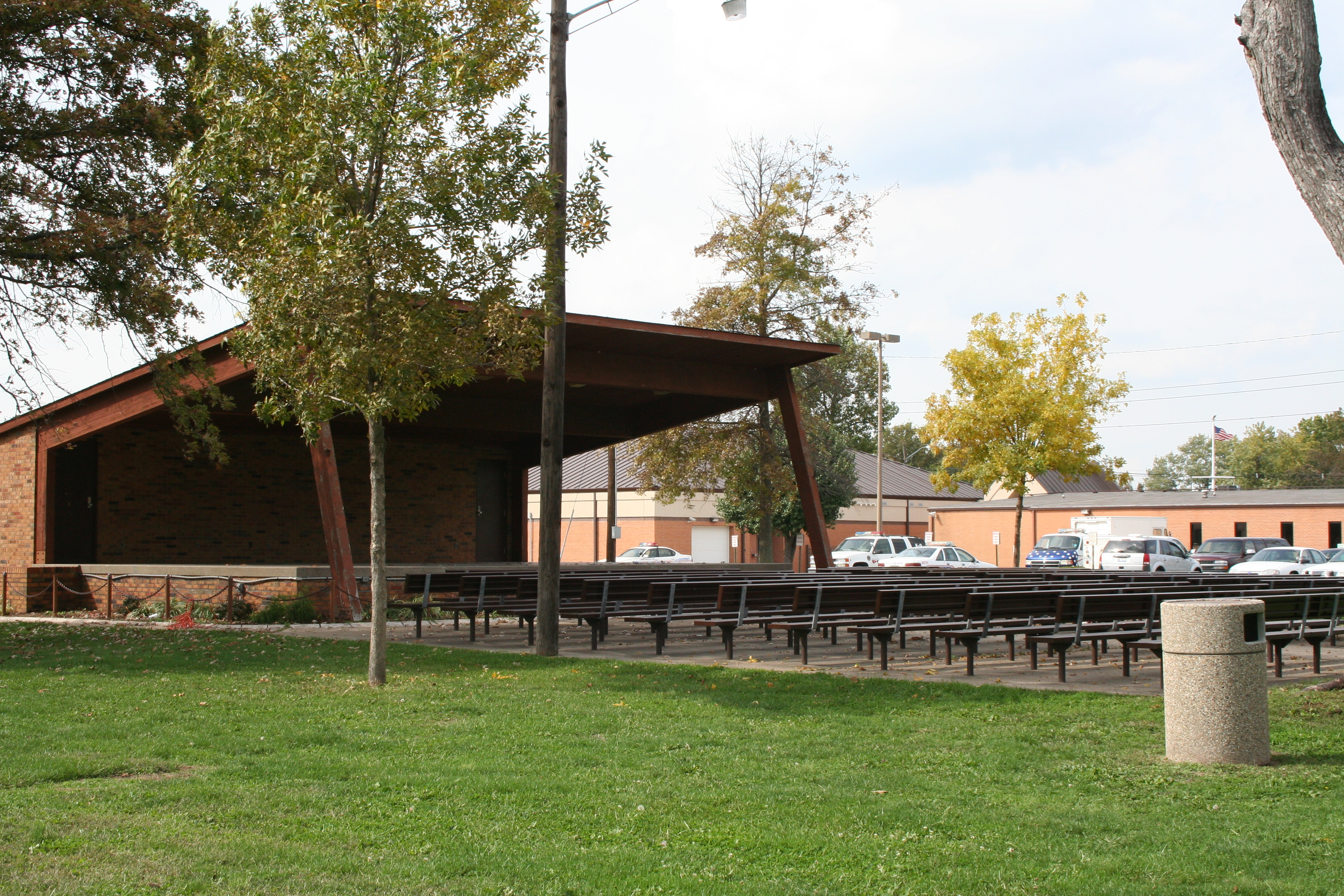
Bandstand in Central Park

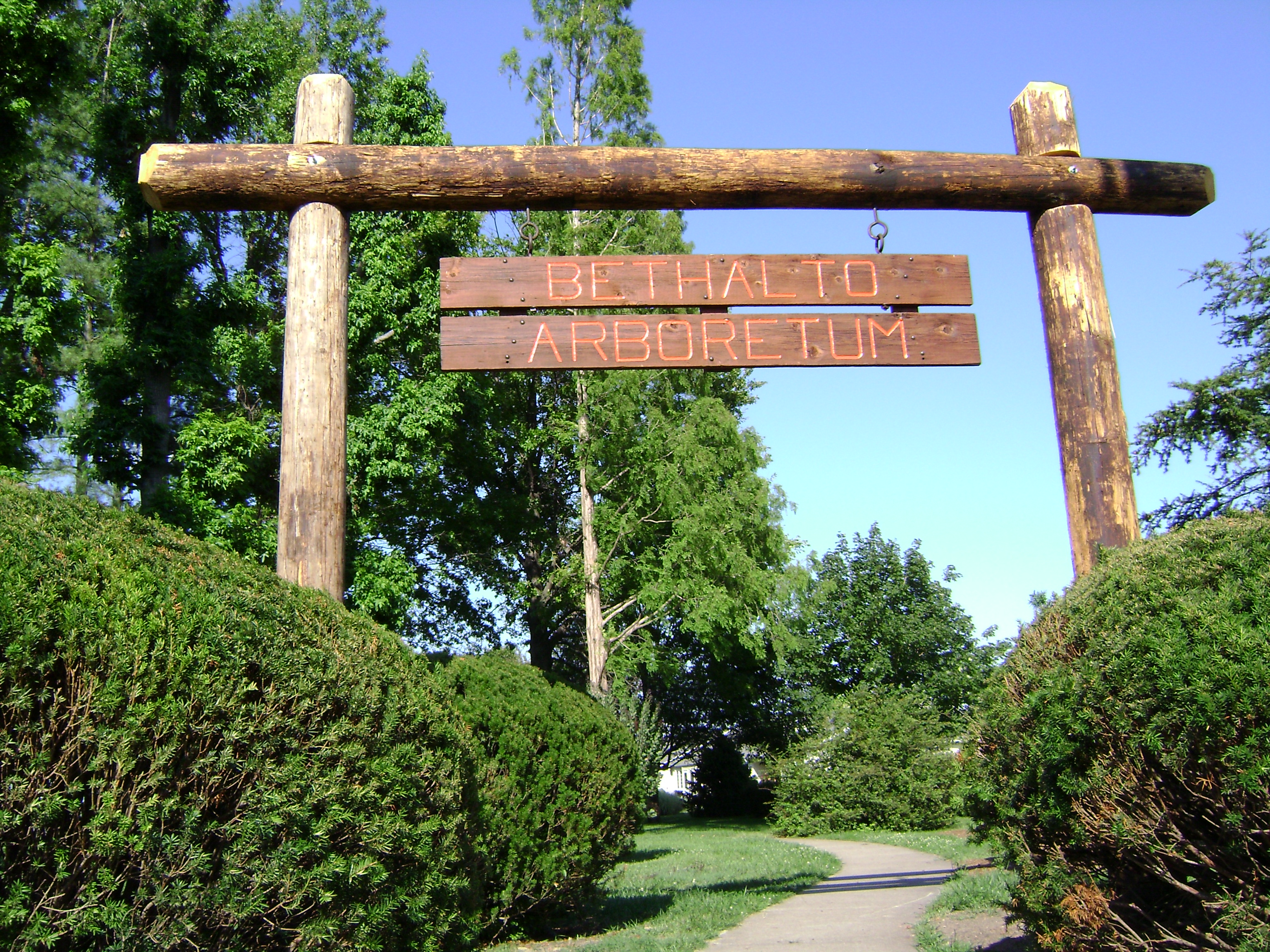
Entrance to the arboretum

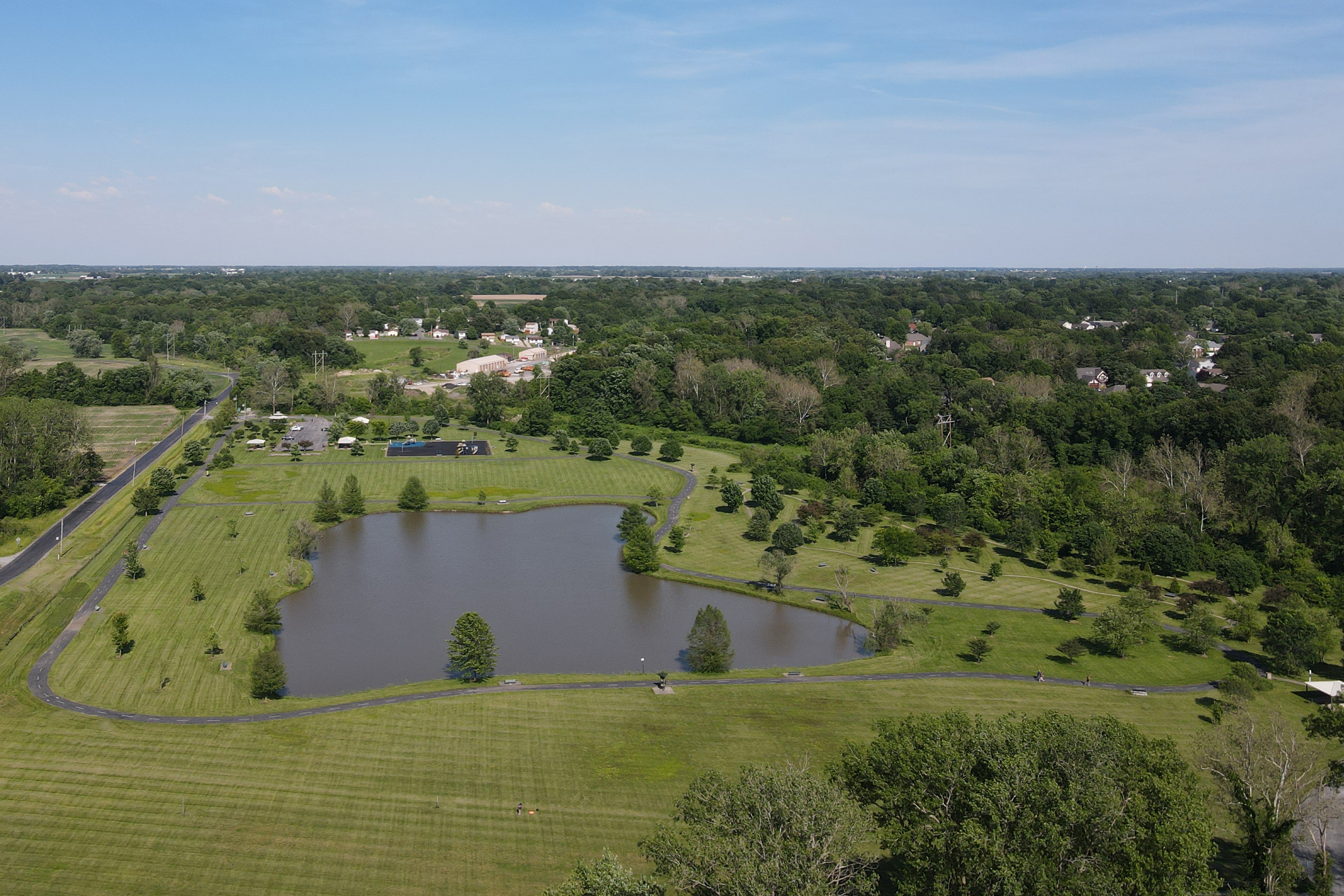
Steve Bryant Park

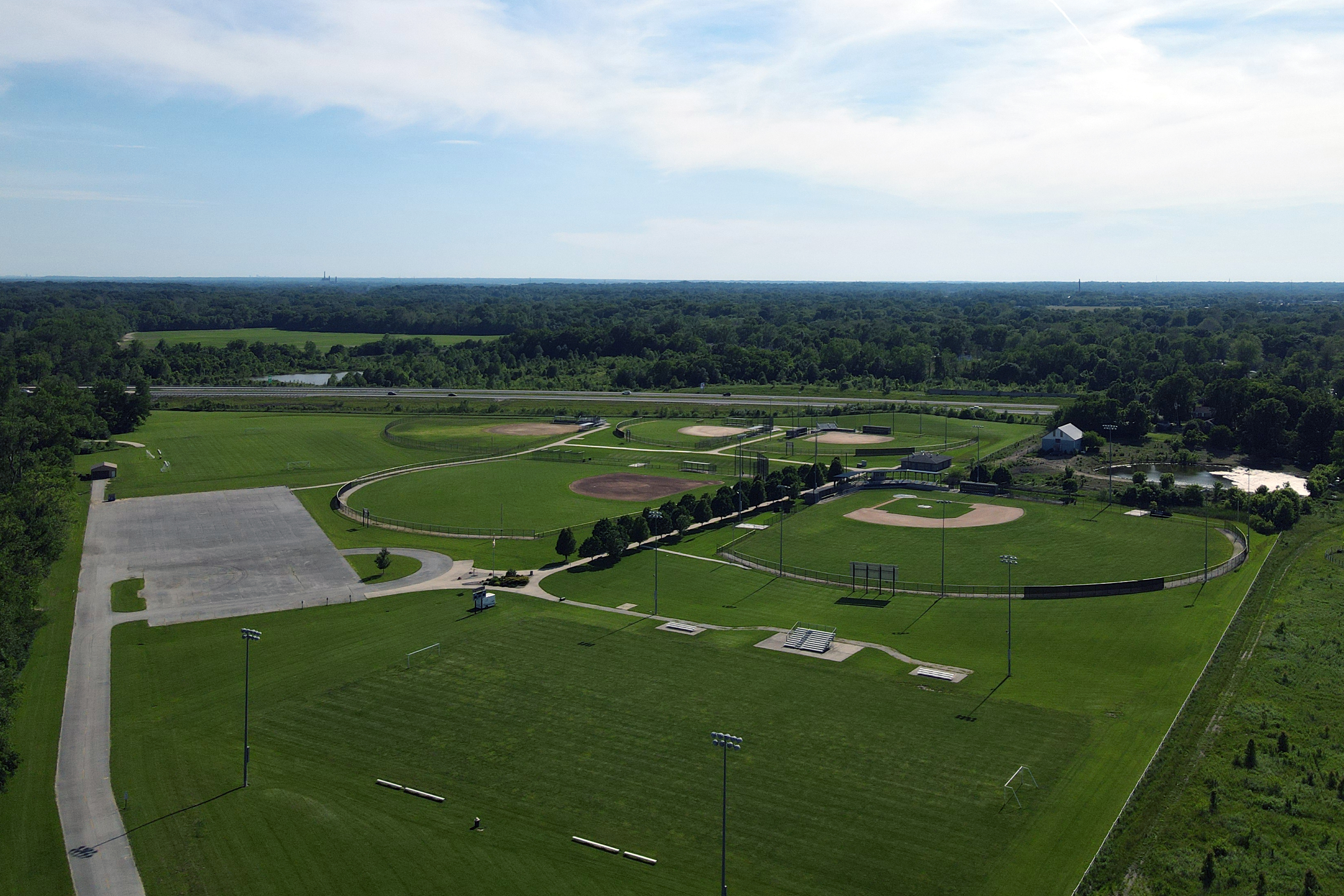
Bethalto Sports Complex

== Notable people ==
- Steve Davis (born 1949), former representative in the Illinois General Assembly
- Deborah Nordyke, Olympic biathlete
- Joe Odom (born 1979), American football player for the Chicago Bears
- Ty Smith, heavy metal drummer
- Wilbur Trimpe (1906–1996), first superintendent of Bethalto Community Unit School District 8
