= Tamalco Township, Illinois =

Tamalco Township
- Township
- Location in Bond County

- Bond County's location in Illinois
- Coordinates: 38°46′50″N 89°18′47″W
- Country: United States
- State: Illinois
- County: Bond
- Settlement: November 6, 1888

Area
  - Total: 38.11 sq mi (98.7 km^{2})
  - Land: 37.17 sq mi (96.3 km^{2})
  - Water: 0.94 sq mi (2.4 km^{2}) 2.47%
- Elevation: 482 ft (147 m)

Population (2020)
  - Total: 522
  - Density: 14.0/sq mi (5.42/km^{2})
- Time zone: UTC-6 (CST)
  - Summer (DST): UTC-5 (CDT)
- ZIP codes: 62246, 62253, 62284
- FIPS code: 17-005-74418

Tamalco Township is one of nine townships in Bond County, Illinois, USA. As of the 2020 census, its population was 522 and it contained 260 housing units.

== Geography ==
According to the 2010 census, the township has a total area of 38.11 square miles (98.7 km^{2}), of which 37.17 square miles (96.3 km^{2}) (or 97.53%) is land and 0.94 square miles (2.4 km^{2}) (or 2.47%) is water.

=== Cities ===
- Keyesport (northwest half)

=== Unincorporated towns ===
- Hookdale
- Tamalco

=== Cemeteries ===
The township contains these four cemeteries: Duncan, McKendree, Payne and Saint Peters.

=== Major highways ===
- Illinois State Route 127
- Illinois State Route 143

=== Lakes ===
- Carlyle Lake

== Demographics ==
As of the 2020 census there were 522 people, 310 households, and 230 families residing in the township. The population density was 13.69 inhabitants per square mile (5.29/km^{2}). There were 260 housing units at an average density of 6.82 per square mile (2.63/km^{2}). The racial makeup of the township was 95.79% White, 0.00% African American, 0.19% Native American, 0.38% Asian, 0.00% Pacific Islander, 0.19% from other races, and 3.45% from two or more races. Hispanic or Latino of any race were 1.15% of the population.

There were 310 households, out of which 38.70% had children under the age of 18 living with them, 60.97% were married couples living together, 12.26% had a female householder with no spouse present, and 25.81% were non-families. 23.90% of all households were made up of individuals, and 15.20% had someone living alone who was 65 years of age or older. The average household size was 2.03 and the average family size was 2.32.

The township's age distribution consisted of 17.6% under the age of 18, 2.9% from 18 to 24, 11.7% from 25 to 44, 39.8% from 45 to 64, and 28.0% who were 65 years of age or older. The median age was 54.0 years. For every 100 females, there were 78.2 males. For every 100 females age 18 and over, there were 74.4 males.

The median income for a household in the township was $44,000, and the median income for a family was $42,278. Males had a median income of $45,100 versus $19,195 for females. The per capita income for the township was $22,945. About 2.2% of families and 11.1% of the population were below the poverty line, including 32.4% of those under age 18 and 3.4% of those age 65 or over.

Historical population
Census	Pop.	Note	%±
2010	566		—
2020	522		−7.8%
U.S. Decennial Census

== School districts ==
- Bond County Community Unit School District 2
- Carlyle Community Unit School District 1
- Mulberry Grove Community Unit School District 1

== Political districts ==
- Illinois' 19th congressional district
- State House District 102
- State Senate District 51
