= Mulberry Grove Township, Illinois =

Township in Illinois, US

Mulberry Grove Township
- Township
- Location in Bond County

- Bond County's location in Illinois
- Coordinates: 38°58′05″N 89°18′46″W
- Country: United States
- State: Illinois
- County: Bond
- Settlement: November 6, 1888

Area
  - Total: 47.43 sq mi (122.8 km^{2})
  - Land: 47.03 sq mi (121.8 km^{2})
  - Water: 0.4 sq mi (1.0 km^{2}) 0.84%
- Elevation: 571 ft (174 m)

Population (2020)
  - Total: 1,133
  - Density: 24.09/sq mi (9.302/km^{2})
- Time zone: UTC-6 (CST)
  - Summer (DST): UTC-5 (CDT)
- ZIP codes: 62017, 62246, 62262, 62284
- FIPS code: 17-005-51297

Mulberry Grove Township is one of nine townships in Bond County, Illinois, USA. As of the 2020 census, its population was 1,133 and it contained 569 housing units.

== Geography ==
According to the 2010 census, the township has a total area of 47.43 square miles (122.8 km^{2}), of which 47.03 square miles (121.8 km^{2}) (or 99.16%) is land and 0.4 square miles (1.0 km^{2}) (or 0.84%) is water.

=== Cities ===
- Mulberry Grove

=== Unincorporated towns ===
- Durley
- Woburn

=== Cemeteries ===
The township contains these seven cemeteries: Dunkard, Durr, Etcheson, Hastings, Liberty, Neathery and Snow.

=== Major highways ===
- U.S. Route 40
- Illinois Route 140

=== Lakes ===
- Governor Bond Lake

== Demographics ==
As of the 2020 census there were 1,133 people, 557 households, and 319 families residing in the township. The population density was 23.92 inhabitants per square mile (9.24/km^{2}). There were 569 housing units at an average density of 12.01 per square mile (4.64/km^{2}). The racial makeup of the township was 93.20% White, 2.03% African American, 0.26% Native American, 0.26% Asian, 0.00% Pacific Islander, 0.18% from other races, and 4.06% from two or more races. Hispanic or Latino of any race were 0.88% of the population.

There were 557 households, out of which 25.70% had children under the age of 18 living with them, 48.65% were married couples living together, 0.72% had a female householder with no spouse present, and 42.73% were non-families. 39.50% of all households were made up of individuals, and 26.60% had someone living alone who was 65 years of age or older. The average household size was 2.27 and the average family size was 2.99.

The township's age distribution consisted of 22.4% under the age of 18, 6.7% from 18 to 24, 23.2% from 25 to 44, 22% from 45 to 64, and 25.7% who were 65 years of age or older. The median age was 44.1 years. For every 100 females, there were 93.4 males. For every 100 females age 18 and over, there were 113.0 males.

The median income for a household in the township was $47,008, and the median income for a family was $60,179. Males had a median income of $35,441 versus $20,703 for females. The per capita income for the township was $24,607. About 7.8% of families and 21.9% of the population were below the poverty line, including 29.3% of those under age 18 and 20.9% of those age 65 or over.

Historical population
Census	Pop.	Note	%±
2010	1,361		—
2020	1,133		−16.8%
U.S. Decennial Census

== School districts ==
- Bond County Community Unit School District 2
- Mulberry Grove Community Unit School District 1

== Political districts ==
- Illinois' 19th congressional district
- State House District 102
- State Senate District 51
