= Pleasant Mound Township, Illinois =

Township in Illinois, US

Pleasant Mound Township
- Township
- Location in Bond County

- Bond County's location in Illinois
- Coordinates: 38°52′54″N 89°18′51″W
- Country: United States
- State: Illinois
- County: Bond
- Settlement: November 6, 1888

Area
  - Total: 37.86 sq mi (98.1 km^{2})
  - Land: 37.81 sq mi (97.9 km^{2})
  - Water: 0.05 sq mi (0.13 km^{2}) 0.13%
- Elevation: 561 ft (171 m)

Population (2020)
  - Total: 907
  - Density: 24.0/sq mi (9.26/km^{2})
- Time zone: UTC-6 (CST)
  - Summer (DST): UTC-5 (CDT)
- ZIP codes: 62246, 62262, 62284
- FIPS code: 17-005-60586

Pleasant Mound Township is one of nine townships in Bond County, Illinois, USA. As of the 2020 census, its population was 907 and it contained 446 housing units.

== Geography ==
According to the 2010 census, the township has a total area of 37.86 square miles (98.1 km^{2}), of which 37.81 square miles (97.9 km^{2}) (or 99.87%) is land and 0.05 square miles (0.13 km^{2}) (or 0.13%) is water.

=== Cities ===
- Greenville (east quarter)
- Smithboro

=== Unincorporated towns ===
- Pleasant Mound

=== Cemeteries ===
The township contains these six cemeteries: Durham, Halls Grove, Maxey, Mulberry Grove, Noffsinger and Seagraves.

=== Major highways ===
- Interstate 70
- U.S. Route 40
- Illinois Route 127
- Illinois Route 140

== Demographics ==
As of the 2020 census there were 907 people, 469 households, and 373 families residing in the township. The population density was 23.92 inhabitants per square mile (9.24/km^{2}). There were 446 housing units at an average density of 11.76 per square mile (4.54/km^{2}). The racial makeup of the township was 89.75% White, 5.18% African American, 0.33% Native American, 0.22% Asian, 0.00% Pacific Islander, 0.55% from other races, and 3.97% from two or more races. Hispanic or Latino of any race were 1.87% of the population.

There were 469 households, out of which 40.30% had children under the age of 18 living with them, 63.97% were married couples living together, 7.89% had a female householder with no spouse present, and 20.47% were non-families. 15.80% of all households were made up of individuals, and 9.20% had someone living alone who was 65 years of age or older. The average household size was 2.49 and the average family size was 2.75.

The township's age distribution consisted of 27.0% under the age of 18, 2.1% from 18 to 24, 24.4% from 25 to 44, 30% from 45 to 64, and 16.3% who were 65 years of age or older. The median age was 40.3 years. For every 100 females, there were 93.4 males. For every 100 females age 18 and over, there were 91.9 males.

The median income for a household in the township was $51,027, and the median income for a family was $63,641. Males had a median income of $61,354 versus $33,021 for females. The per capita income for the township was $26,259. About 6.2% of families and 10.1% of the population were below the poverty line, including 12.5% of those under age 18 and 11.0% of those age 65 or over.

Historical population
Census	Pop.	Note	%±
2010	1,018		—
2020	907		−10.9%
U.S. Decennial Census

== School districts ==
- Bond County Community Unit School District 2
- Mulberry Grove Community Unit School District 1
- Vandalia Community Unit School District 203

== Political districts ==
- Illinois' 19th congressional district
- State House District 102
- State Senate District 51
