= Mills Township, Illinois =

Township in Illinois, US

Mills Township
- Township
- Location in Bond County

- Bond County's location in Illinois
- Coordinates: 38°47′19″N 89°25′16″W
- Country: United States
- State: Illinois
- County: Bond
- Settlement: November 6, 1888

Area
  - Total: 36.5 sq mi (95 km^{2})
  - Land: 36.46 sq mi (94.4 km^{2})
  - Water: 0.04 sq mi (0.10 km^{2}) 0.11%
- Elevation: 505 ft (154 m)

Population (2020)
  - Total: 473
  - Density: 13.0/sq mi (5.01/km^{2})
- Time zone: UTC-6 (CST)
  - Summer (DST): UTC-5 (CDT)
- ZIP codes: 62231, 62246, 62275
- FIPS code: 17-005-49321

Mills Township is one of nine townships in Bond County, Illinois, US. As of the 2020 census, its population was 473 and it contained 219 housing units.

== Geography ==
According to the 2010 census, the township has a total area of 36.5 square miles (95 km^{2}), of which 36.46 square miles (94.4 km^{2}) (or 99.89%) is land and 0.04 square miles (0.10 km^{2}) (or 0.11%) is water.

=== Unincorporated towns ===
- Beaver Creek
- Dudleyville

=== Cemeteries ===
The township contains these three cemeteries: Greene, Weinheimer and Wisetown.

=== Major highways ===
- Illinois State Route 127
- Illinois State Route 143

== Demographics ==
As of the 2020 census there were 473 people, 200 households, and 152 families residing in the township. The population density was 12.94 inhabitants per square mile (5.00/km^{2}). There were 219 housing units at an average density of 5.99 per square mile (2.31/km^{2}). The racial makeup of the township was 98.10% White, 0.00% African American, 0.00% Native American, 0.00% Asian, 0.00% Pacific Islander, 0.85% from other races, and 1.06% from two or more races. Hispanic or Latino of any race were 2.54% of the population.

There were 200 households, out of which 25.00% had children under the age of 18 living with them, 66.00% were married couples living together, 6.50% had a female householder with no spouse present, and 24.00% were non-families. 24.00% of all households were made up of individuals, and 9.00% had someone living alone who was 65 years of age or older. The average household size was 2.32 and the average family size was 2.68.

The township's age distribution consisted of 20.0% under the age of 18, 9.9% from 18 to 24, 21.3% from 25 to 44, 34.2% from 45 to 64, and 14.4% who were 65 years of age or older. The median age was 41.5 years. For every 100 females, there were 108.1 males. For every 100 females age 18 and over, there were 95.3 males.

The median income for a household in the township was $84,000, and the median income for a family was $85,625. Males had a median income of $51,442 versus $32,222 for females. The per capita income for the township was $59,743. About 8.6% of families and 7.1% of the population were below the poverty line, including 12.9% of those under age 18 and none of those age 65 or over.

Historical population
Census	Pop.	Note	%±
2010	552		—
2020	473		−14.3%
U.S. Decennial Census

== School districts ==
- Bond County Community Unit School District 2

== Born in Mills ==
- Leona Roberts (1879–1954), theatre and film actress, perhaps best known as Mrs. Meade in Gone with the Wind

== Political districts ==
- Illinois' 19th congressional district
- State House District 102
- State Senate District 51
