= Maurice McAdow =

American conductor, trumpeter, and music educator

Maurice Clark McAdow (17 November 1904 in Greenville, Illinois – 20 August 2001 in Denton, Texas) was an American conductor, trumpeter, and music educator (with high proficiency on woodwinds) who served as director of bands at the University of North Texas College of Music for 29 years, from fall 1945 to spring 1975. The concert bands under his direction were acclaimed for performing a wide repertoire that exhibited advanced levels of musicianship commensurate with a major music school. The marching bands under his direction were known for innovative and colorful halftime shows. Since the mid-1940s, the College of Music had been, and still is, among the nation's largest music schools. Due to the size of the music school, his marching bands were filled with an unusual number of music majors, sometimes exceeding 90%.

== Career & education ==
Secondary education

McAdow had attended Anthony High School, Anthony, Kansas, and played in its band, but quit in 1920 to perform with the Peggy Norman Players, a tent show. After traveling a few months with the show, he returned to Kansas to finish high school, graduating in 1922. Upon graduating, he enrolled at Montana State University Billings, where he father was teaching. After a year of studying, McAdow spent 6 years on the road performing with groups before returning to live with his mother in Greenville, Illinois.

Founder of bands

The Great Depression (early 1930s) was the impetus for McAdow to seek steady work in music, so he entered his father's avocation of teaching music in public schools.

In 1931, McAdow became a band director at Mulberry Grove Middle and High School, though he did not have a college degree. When is 14-piece band won a "Division 1" rating in the first year, he became interested in making it a career. During his tenure at Mulberry Grove, he played in a number of community bands while pursuing a degree in music. Attending summer and Saturday classes, earning a Bachelor of Music Education of Illinois Wesleyan University in 1939.

McAdow also had his own band — Maurice McAdow and His Orchestra — that played dances at local dance halls.

While at Mulberry Grove, McAdow started the New Douglas and Sorento Bands. His soon to be wife, Evelyn Delores Bartels, was a clarinet player in the New Douglas Band. He organized a third band at Pocahontas, Illinois. In 1935, all three bands performed at the state contest at the University of Illinois at Urbana–Champaign. In 1936, the Greenville School System appointed McAdow as its high school band director. He flourished there for eight years.

In the fall of 1943, McAdow moved from Greenville to Elmhurst to accept a position as band and orchestra instructor at York Community High School.

Educator at the university level

In 1945, McAdow joined the faculty of the University of North Texas College of Music and proceeded to build the concert and marching band program. During his 28 years at North Texas, McAdow led the band on 28 tours throughout 13 states, appeared eight times at the Texas Music Educators Association and appeared at various other conventions, such as the College Band Directors National Association and the Music Educators National Convention. After his retirement in 1975 at the age of 70, he continued to work as a consultant for school music programs under the auspices of the Brook Mays Music Company of Dallas.

McAdow served as an adjudicator, guest conductor and clinician in 21 states.

== Formal music education ==
- Graduated from Anthony High School, Anthony, Kansas, 1922.

In the mid-1920s, McAdow studied with:

- Herman Bellstedt (1858–1926)
- Edward Llewellyn (1879–1936), principal trumpet of the Chicago Symphony Orchestra.

Beginning in 1930 he spent eight years of intensive study of the woodwinds, trombone, and percussion with symphony artists. During this time, he played flute with the St. Louis Philharmonic Orchestra. He studied with:

- Edward Carl Oventrop (1888–1952), trombonist with the St Louis Symphony, 1923–24 season & 1931–32 through 1933–34 seasons
- Rocco Michael Zottarelle (1889–1983), clarinetist with the St. Louis Symphony
- Johann Friedrich Kiburz (1876–1944), flutist with the St. Louis Symphony
- Dall C. Fields (1889–1956), clarinet, bassoon, oboe, and flute of Chicago
- John E. Ferrell (1892– ), bassoonist with the St. Louis Symphony, 1926–27 through 1958–1959 seasons

McAdow received a bachelor's degree from Illinois Wesleyan University in 1939, was a conducting pupil of Ralph Lyford, Alfred Hicks, and, from 1943 to 1944, Russian conductor Nicolai Malko. McAdow received a master's degree from the American Conservatory of Music in 1953.

== Awards ==
- 1973: Texas Bandmaster of the Year, Texas Bandmasters Association
- 1974: Inducted into the American Bandmasters Association
- Honorary lifetime membership in Phi Mu Alpha Sinfonia fraternity
- Honorary lifetime membership in the Kappa Kappa Psi band fraternity
- 1990: Inducted as Honorary Alumnus of the University of North Texas
- 1991: Inducted into the Texas Bandmasters' Hall of Fame, Phi Beta Mu, Alpha Chapter (Texas)
- 1992: Charter Inductee into the Region V Bandmasters' Hall of Fame
- 2000: Awarded the Grainger Medallion, International Percy Grainger Society

== Selected discography ==
- Symphony for Band, Silver Crest CBD 69-2 (LP) (1969) (1967) OCLC 4473187

Maurice McAdow, Conductor
North Texas State University Concert Band

1. Holst: Jupiter from The Planets
2. Ginastera: Danza Final from Estancia
3. Kepner: The Sea from Cuban Fantasy
4. Shostakovich: Festive Overture
5. Wagner: Flying Dutchman Overture

== Family ==
McAdow's father, William Paisley McAdow Jr. (1878–1938), was a professional trumpet player, composer, and band director. His son, Scott (born 1954), is a secondary school music educator in Texas.
