= Elm Point, Illinois =

- Former settlement
- Location within Illinois
- Coordinates: 39°00′21″N 89°28′25″W
- Country: United States
- State: Illinois
- County: Bond
- Elevation: 610 ft (190 m)
- GNIS feature ID: 1785369

Elm Point is a former settlement in Bond County, Illinois, United States. Elm Point was south of Donnellson. Elm Point appeared on maps as late as 1876. The townsite lies on Illinois State Route 127, the dividing line between Lagrange Township (east) and Shoal Creek Township (west).
