= Governor Bond Lake =

Lake in the United States

- Location within Illinois Location within the United States
- Location: Bond County, Illinois
- Coordinates: 38°55′27″N 89°23′55″W
- Type: Reservoir
- Basin countries: United States
- Built: 1968–1970
- Surface area: 775 acres (314 ha)
- Surface elevation: 522 ft (159 m)

Governor Bond Lake is a reservoir in Bond County, Illinois, United States. The reservoir covers an area of 775 acres (314 ha). The reservoir was built from 1968 to 1970 as a water supply reservoir for the cities of Greenville, Mulberry Grove, Donnellson, and Smithboro.
