= Central Township, Illinois =

Township in Illinois, US

Central Township
- Township
- Location in Bond County

- Bond County's location in Illinois
- Coordinates: 38°52′14″N 89°25′52″W
- Country: United States
- State: Illinois
- County: Bond
- Settlement: November 6, 1888

Area
  - Total: 37.17 sq mi (96.3 km^{2})
  - Land: 37.14 sq mi (96.2 km^{2})
  - Water: 0.04 sq mi (0.10 km^{2}) 0.11%
- Elevation: 568 ft (173 m)

Population (2020)
  - Total: 7,968
  - Density: 214.5/sq mi (82.83/km^{2})
- Time zone: UTC-6 (CST)
  - Summer (DST): UTC-5 (CDT)
- ZIP codes: 62246, 62275, 62284
- FIPS code: 17-005-12112

Central Township is one of nine townships in Bond County, Illinois, USA. As of the 2020 census, its population was 7.968 and it contained 2,788 housing units.

== Geography ==
According to the 2010 census, the township has a total area of 37.17 square miles (96.3 km^{2}), of which 37.14 square miles (96.2 km^{2}) (or 99.92%) is land and 0.04 square miles (0.10 km^{2}) (or 0.11%) is water.

=== Cities ===
- Greenville (the county seat) (west three-quarters)

=== Unincorporated towns ===
- Stubblefield

(This list is based on USGS data and may include former settlements.)

=== Cemeteries ===
The township contains these nine cemeteries: Hazel Dell, Hazel Dell, Montrose, Mount Auburn, Mount Gilead, Mount Moriah, Old City, Saint Lawrence Catholic and Smith Grove.

=== Major highways ===
- Interstate 70
- U.S. Route 40
- Illinois Route 127
- Illinois Route 140

=== Airports and landing strips ===
- Edw A Utlaut Memorial Heliport
- Greenville Airport

=== Lakes ===
- Greenville Lake

=== Landmarks ===
- Greenville Correctional Institution

== Demographics ==
As of the 2020 census there were 7,968 people, 2,655 households, and 1,425 families residing in the township. The population density was 214.43 inhabitants per square mile (82.79/km^{2}). There were 2,788 housing units at an average density of 75.03 per square mile (28.97/km^{2}). The racial makeup of the township was 77.55% White, 12.27% African American, 0.41% Native American, 1.14% Asian, 0.14% Pacific Islander, 4.19% from other races, and 4.29% from two or more races. Hispanic or Latino of any race were 6.09% of the population.

There were 2,655 households, out of which 26.30% had children under the age of 18 living with them, 42.15% were married couples living together, 10.70% had a female householder with no spouse present, and 46.33% were non-families. 36.20% of all households were made up of individuals, and 19.50% had someone living alone who was 65 years of age or older. The average household size was 2.09 and the average family size was 2.74.

The township's age distribution consisted of 15.0% under the age of 18, 14.4% from 18 to 24, 27.3% from 25 to 44, 25.4% from 45 to 64, and 17.9% who were 65 years of age or older. The median age was 40.2 years. For every 100 females, there were 134.1 males. For every 100 females age 18 and over, there were 127.6 males.

The median income for a household in the township was $44,397, and the median income for a family was $65,417. Males had a median income of $31,250 versus $26,574 for females. The per capita income for the township was $23,332. About 8.9% of families and 19.6% of the population were below the poverty line, including 25.9% of those under age 18 and 6.3% of those age 65 or over.

Historical population
Census	Pop.	Note	%±
2010	8,013		—
2020	7,968		−0.6%
U.S. Decennial Census

== School districts ==
- Bond County Community Unit School District 2

== Political districts ==
- Illinois' 19th congressional district
- State House District 102
- State Senate District 51
