= Old Ripley Township, Illinois =

Township in Illinois, US

Old Ripley Township
- Township
- Location in Bond County

- Bond County's location in Illinois
- Coordinates: 38°52′35″N 89°33′29″W
- Country: United States
- State: Illinois
- County: Bond
- Settlement: November 6, 1888

Area
  - Total: 43.64 sq mi (113.0 km^{2})
  - Land: 43.63 sq mi (113.0 km^{2})
  - Water: 0.02 sq mi (0.052 km^{2}) 0.05%
- Elevation: 568 ft (173 m)

Population (2020)
  - Total: 819
  - Density: 18.8/sq mi (7.25/km^{2})
- Time zone: UTC-6 (CST)
  - Summer (DST): UTC-5 (CDT)
- ZIP codes: 62074, 62086, 62246, 62275
- FIPS code: 17-005-55730

Old Ripley Township is one of nine townships in Bond County, Illinois, USA. As of the 2020 census, its population was 819 and it contained 356 housing units.

== Geography ==
According to the 2010 census, the township has a total area of 43.64 square miles (113.0 km^{2}), of which 43.63 square miles (113.0 km^{2}) (or 99.98%) is land and 0.02 square miles (0.052 km^{2}) (or 0.05%) is water.

=== Cities ===
- Old Ripley
- Pocahontas (north edge)

=== Cemeteries ===
The township contains these seven cemeteries: Brown, File, Mitchell, Mount Nebo Old, New Mount Nebo, Robinson and Sugg Number 1.

=== Major highways ===
- Interstate 70
- Illinois State Route 140

=== Airports and landing strips ===
- Nance Airport

== Demographics ==
As of the 2020 census there were 819 people, 366 households, and 258 families residing in the township. The population density was 18.77 inhabitants per square mile (7.25/km^{2}). There were 356 housing units at an average density of 8.16 per square mile (3.15/km^{2}). The racial makeup of the township was 96.70% White, 0.61% African American, 0.00% Native American, 0.00% Asian, 0.00% Pacific Islander, 0.24% from other races, and 2.44% from two or more races. Hispanic or Latino of any race were 0.49% of the population.

There were 366 households, out of which 38.50% had children under the age of 18 living with them, 68.58% were married couples living together, none had a female householder with no spouse present, and 29.51% were non-families. 26.80% of all households were made up of individuals, and 20.20% had someone living alone who was 65 years of age or older. The average household size was 3.22 and the average family size was 4.10.

The township's age distribution consisted of 33.5% under the age of 18, 7.5% from 18 to 24, 24.9% from 25 to 44, 22.7% from 45 to 64, and 11.5% who were 65 years of age or older. The median age was 30.4 years. For every 100 females, there were 82.5 males. For every 100 females age 18 and over, there were 85.3 males.

The median income for a household in the township was $81,250, and the median income for a family was $106,354. Males had a median income of $41,518 versus $29,063 for females. The per capita income for the township was $27,136. No families and 0.8% of the population were below the poverty line, including none of those under age 18 and none of those age 65 or over.

Historical population
Census	Pop.	Note	%±
2010	867		—
2020	819		−5.5%
U.S. Decennial Census

== School districts ==
- Bond County Community Unit School District 2
- Highland Community Unit School District 5

== Political districts ==
- Illinois' 19th congressional district
- State House District 102
- State Senate District 51
