= Elm Point =

Elm Point may refer to:

- Elm Point, Illinois
- Elm Point, Minnesota
- Elm Point, Missouri
