= Lagrange Township, Illinois =

Township in Illinois, US

Lagrange Township
- Township
- Location in Bond County

- Bond County's location in Illinois
- Coordinates: 38°58′31″N 89°25′50″W
- Country: United States
- State: Illinois
- County: Bond
- Settlement: November 6, 1888

Area
  - Total: 46.48 sq mi (120.4 km^{2})
  - Land: 45.61 sq mi (118.1 km^{2})
  - Water: 0.87 sq mi (2.3 km^{2}) 1.87%
- Elevation: 571 ft (174 m)

Population (2020)
  - Total: 1,103
  - Density: 24.18/sq mi (9.337/km^{2})
- Time zone: UTC-6 (CST)
  - Summer (DST): UTC-5 (CDT)
- ZIP codes: 62019, 62086, 62246, 62262
- FIPS code: 17-005-40741

Lagrange Township is one of nine townships in Bond County, Illinois, USA. As of the 2020 census, its population was 1,103 and it contained 512 housing units.

== Geography ==
According to the 2010 census, the township has a total area of 46.48 square miles (120.4 km^{2}), of which 45.61 square miles (118.1 km^{2}) (or 98.13%) is land and 0.87 square miles (2.3 km^{2}) (or 1.87%) is water.

=== Extinct settlements ===
- Elm Point

=== Cemeteries ===
The township contains these four cemeteries: Elm Point, Jett Number, Union Grove and Wright.

=== Major highways ===
- Illinois State Route 127

=== Lakes ===
- Governor Bond Lake

== Demographics ==
As of the 2020 census there were 1,103 people, 434 households, and 357 families residing in the township. The population density was 23.73 inhabitants per square mile (9.16/km^{2}). There were 512 housing units at an average density of 11.01 per square mile (4.25/km^{2}). The racial makeup of the township was 93.93% White, 0.45% African American, 0.18% Native American, 0.18% Asian, 0.00% Pacific Islander, 0.18% from other races, and 5.08% from two or more races. Hispanic or Latino of any race were 1.81% of the population.

There were 434 households, out of which 19.60% had children under the age of 18 living with them, 78.57% were married couples living together, 3.69% had a female householder with no spouse present, and 17.74% were non-families. 12.90% of all households were made up of individuals, and 3.90% had someone living alone who was 65 years of age or older. The average household size was 2.42 and the average family size was 2.50.

The township's age distribution consisted of 12.6% under the age of 18, 6.7% from 18 to 24, 14% from 25 to 44, 39.7% from 45 to 64, and 27.0% who were 65 years of age or older. The median age was 54.9 years. For every 100 females, there were 122.9 males. For every 100 females age 18 and over, there were 110.8 males.

The median income for a household in the township was $86,250, and the median income for a family was $96,250. Males had a median income of $54,097 versus $30,833 for females. The per capita income for the township was $42,902. About 9.0% of families and 7.5% of the population were below the poverty line, including 20.7% of those under age 18 and 3.9% of those age 65 or over.

Historical population
Census	Pop.	Note	%±
2010	1,169		—
2020	1,103		−5.6%
U.S. Decennial Census

== School districts ==
- Bond County Community Unit School District 2
- Hillsboro Community Unit School District 3
- Mulberry Grove Community Unit School District 1

== Political districts ==
- Illinois' 19th congressional district
- State House District 102
- State Senate District 51
