= Durley, Illinois =

- Unincorporated community
- Location within Illinois Location within the United States
- Coordinates: 38°56′04″N 89°22′05″W
- Country: United States
- State: Illinois
- County: Bond
- Elevation: 568 ft (173 m)
- Time zone: UTC-6 (Central (CST))
  - Summer (DST): UTC-5 (CDT)
- Area code: 618
- GNIS feature ID: 422644

Durley is an unincorporated community in Bond County, Illinois, United States. Durley is northeast of Greenville near Governor Bond Lake.

== History ==
Durley was laid out in the 1880s. The community bears the name of Horatio Durley, a local pioneer. A post office was established at Durley in 1888, and remained in operation until 1903.
