= Greenville High School (Illinois) =

American high school in southern Illinois

Location
- 1000 E. State Rt. 140; Greenville, Illinois; United States; 38.9012°N 89.3993°W

Information
- Type: Public high school
- School district: Bond County Community Unit School District 2
- Principal: Kara Harris
- Teaching staff: 35.65 (FTE)
- Grades: 9–12
- Enrollment: 486 (2023–24)
- Student to teacher ratio: 13.63
- Colors: Royal blue and white
- Nickname: Comets
- Website: bccu2.org/o/bccu2hs

Greenville High School, official named Bond County Community Unit #2 High School, is a high school for grades 9-12 students located in Greenville, Illinois. It serves students from much of Bond County, Illinois, including Pocahontas and Sorento.

The school is commonly referred to as GHS and is home to the Greenville Comets sports teams.

== History ==
Greenville has had a high school for 138 years, with the first "Greenville High School" created in 1869. The school was begun under the auspices of Samuel Inglis, who would later become the state superintendent of schools. The first building was torn down and a new Central School erected on Second Street in 1894. By 1915, a new school building was located at Beaumont and Wyatt streets. The current building was constructed in 1956; the former Beaumont building was used as Greenville Junior High after the new high school was built. As the new high school opened, high schools in Pocahontas and Sorento closed and those students began attending GHS.

Noted environmental activist Howard Zahniser, who wrote the Wilderness Act of 1964, taught English at Greenville High School in the 1930s. 1956 Prohibition Party candidate for President, Enoch A. Holtwick, was a professor of history and government at Greenville College and talked to Greenville High School classes in the 1950s.

The yearbook is named The Graduate and has been published since 1918. The school newspaper was originally called The G Whiz, later The GHS Times and then called The Comet Spirit.

Country music star Gretchen Wilson attended Greenville High School but did not graduate.

== Classes ==
Students can take a variety of classes at the school. Students who prefer to study vocational trades can take a bus to Vandalia and attend classes there at Okaw Valley Vocational Center. The building trades class at the center each year purchases property in Vandalia, builds a house, and re-sells it; they have sold 33 homes this way.

== Library ==
The school employs one full-time librarian; students can serve as workers in the library during their study periods.

Students can use the online reference resources, such as OCLC, from school or home to access the billion periodicals that OCLC WorldCat provides access to as research resources. Additionally, as a member of the regional Lewis & Clark Library System and the statewide system IShare (formerly Illininet) and statewide database, the library also provides students with access to thousands of books from hundreds of school, public, and college libraries by way of interlibrary loan.

Each student who wants one is issued a library card and is responsible for all materials checked out on that card. Fines are charged for overdue books.

== Athletics ==
GHS is a member of the Illinois High School Association and plays in the South Central Conference. GHS offers many sports including baseball, basketball, cheerleading, football, golf, soccer, softball, tennis, track, and volleyball. GHS athletic teams have won multiple regional championships and the baseball team has won the sectional championship in 1998. The GHS cheerleading team won first overall in the small division at IHSA state competitive cheerleading competition.
