= Donnellson =

Donnellson may refer to a place in the United States:

- Donnellson, Illinois
- Donnellson, Iowa
