= Dudleyville =

Dudleyville may refer to:

- Dudleyville, Alabama, United States
- Dudleyville, Arizona, United States
- Dudleyville, Illinois, United States
- Dudleyville, Michigan, United States
- Dudleyville, the fictional hometown of the Dudley Boyz
