= Beaver Creek, Illinois =

- Unincorporated community
- Nickname: Wisetown
- Location within Illinois Location within the United States
- Coordinates: 38°46′03″N 89°23′37″W
- Country: United States
- State: Illinois
- County: Bond
- Elevation: 505 ft (154 m)
- Time zone: UTC-6 (Central (CST))
  - Summer (DST): UTC-5 (CDT)
- Area code: 618
- GNIS feature ID =: 404057

Beaver Creek, also known as Wisetown, is an unincorporated community in southern Bond County, Illinois, United States. Beaver Creek is located just south of Illinois Route 143 in Mills Township. Beaver Creek flows past one half mile west of the community. The community is home to the Wisetown Baptist Church and the Wisetown Cemetery lies to the southwest along Beaver Creek. Greenville lies ten miles to the north and Carlyle is about 13 miles to the south along Illinois Route 127.
