= Ripson Bridge =

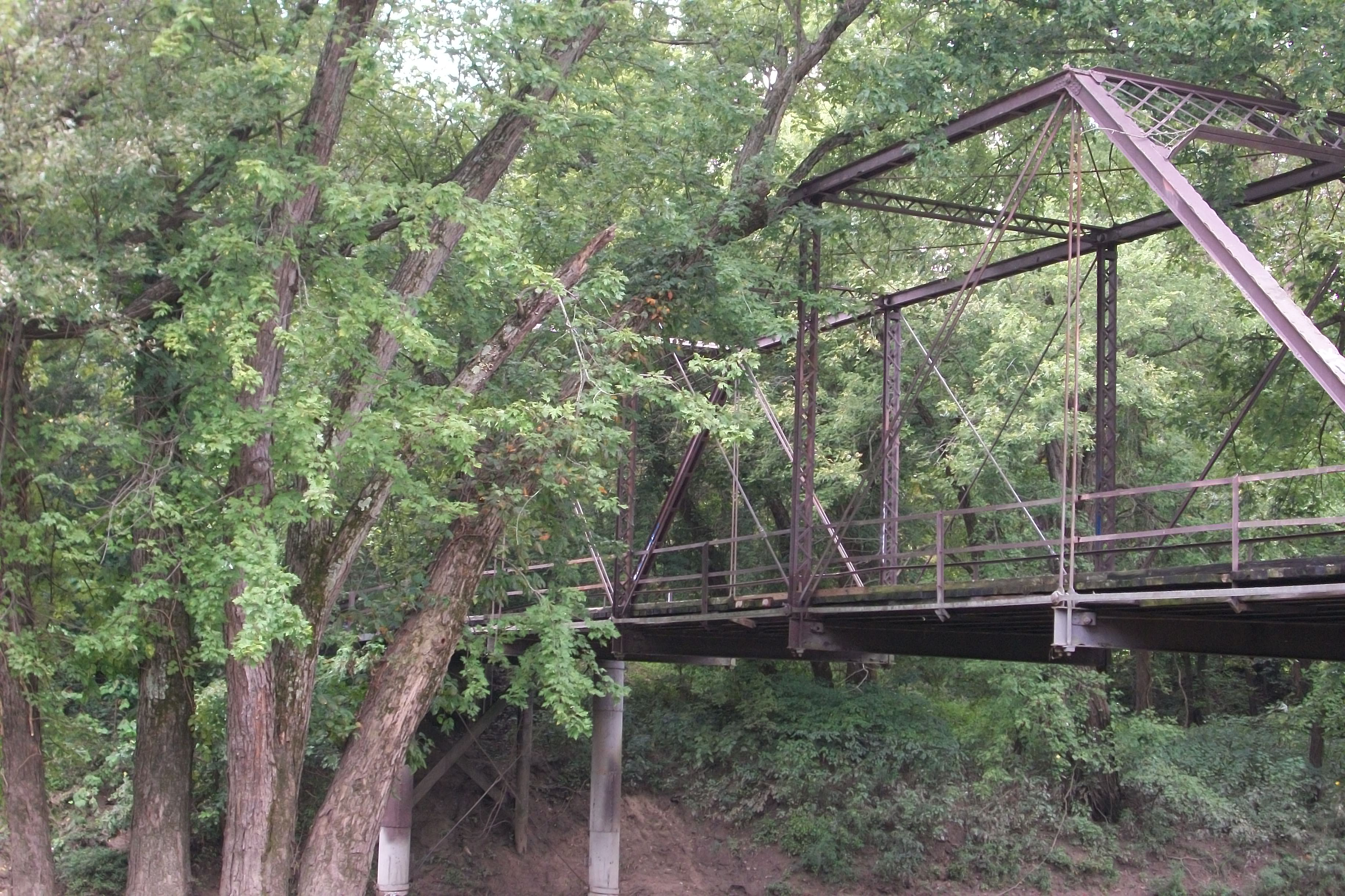
- Side view of Ripson Bridge
- Coordinates: 38°57′37″N 89°33′24″W
- Crosses: Shoal Creek
- Locale: Sorento, Illinois
- Other name(s): Historic Ripson Bridge and Suicide Bridge

Characteristics
- Design: Truss bridge

History
- Opened: April 1895
- Closed: July 1, 1988 (added a no trespassing sign)

Ripson Bridge is a truss bridge located southeast of Sorento, Illinois, in the United States. It is the last pony truss bridge in Bond County, and one of a few remaining pony truss bridges left in the state of Illinois. Ripson Bridge was designated a local and county historical site in 1988.

== History ==
Ripson Bridge was built over Shoal Creek in 1895 on property originally owned by Cyrus Ripson. Ripson Bridge was a part of the transportation system in Bond County until 1988 when a new bridge was completed in the summer of 1988 just north of Ripson Bridge. Shortly after, the bridge was sold to the Sorento Homecoming Association. The Sorento Homecoming Association sold the bridge and Ripson Bridge is now owned by private owners.

== Festival ==
On Sunday, September 25, 1988, the first Ripson Bridge Festival was held. The Ripson Bridge Festival was held annually until 2016 and has become an important part of the community fabric of Sorento and its citizens. In 2016, the Ripson Bridge Festival was forced to relocated to downtown Sorento because of severe rains and flooding. It has since been held in downtown Sorento and has been renamed the Sorento Fall Festival. Over 10,000 people attended the Ripson Bridge Festival in 2013.

The Sorento Fall Festival is usually held during the first Sunday in October.

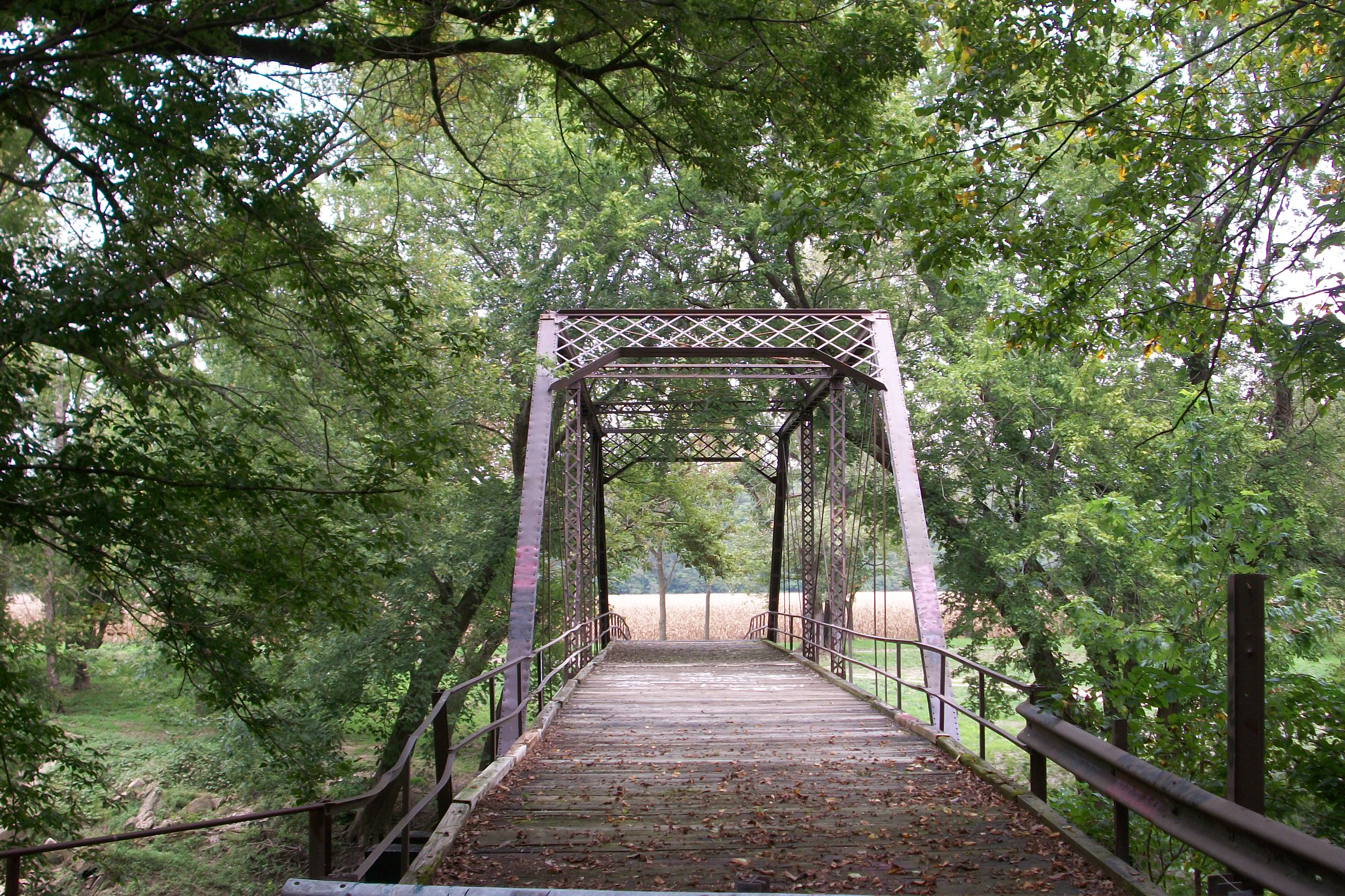
Ripson Bridge

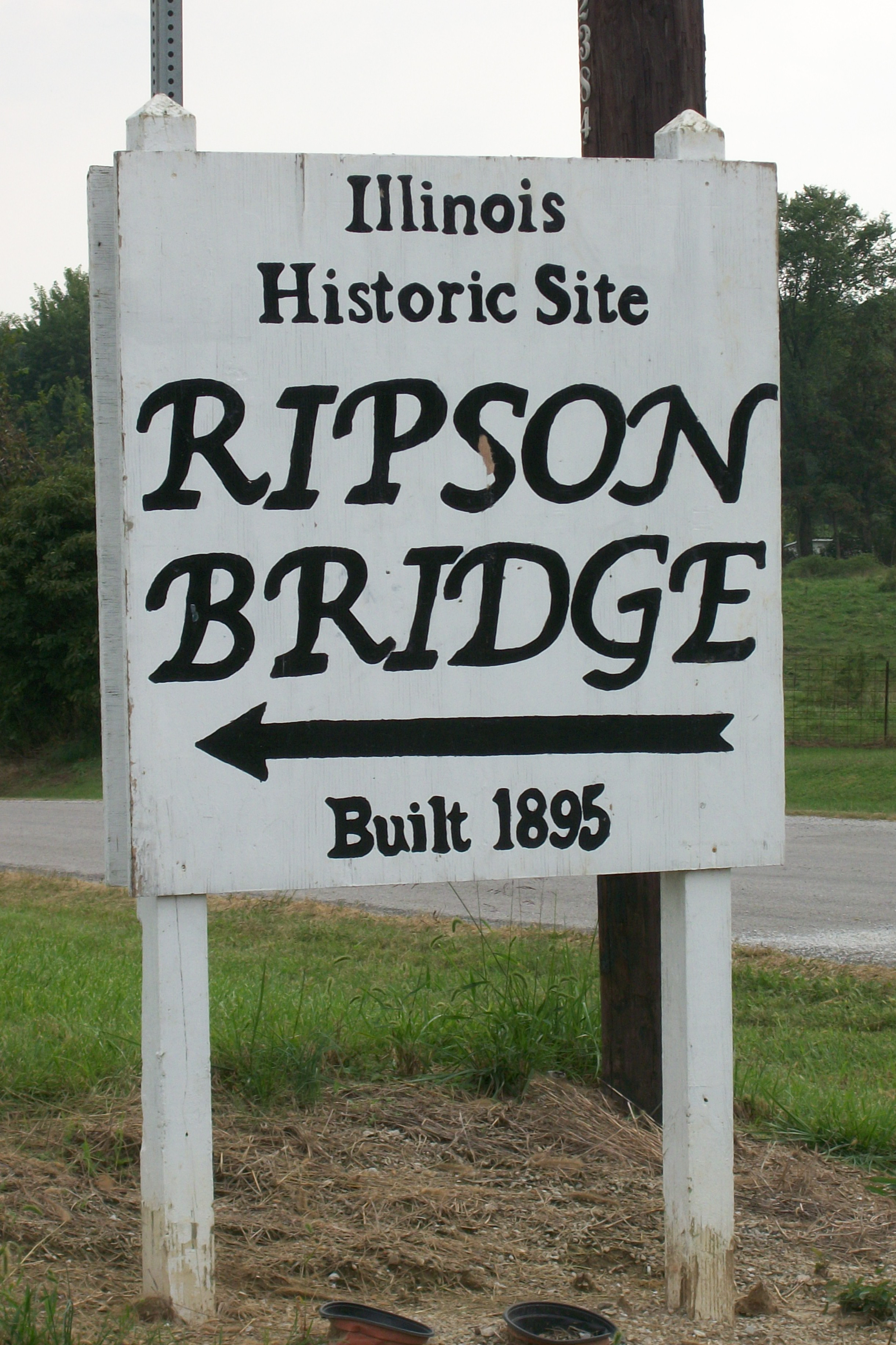
Sign leading to Ripson Bridge
