= Panama, Illinois =

- Village
- Location in Bond and Montgomery counties, Illinois
- Coordinates: 39°01′45″N 89°31′29″W
- Country: United States
- State: Illinois
- Counties: Bond, Montgomery
- Townships: Shoal Creek, Grisham

Area
  - Total: 0.37 sq mi (0.95 km^{2})
  - Land: 0.36 sq mi (0.94 km^{2})
  - Water: 0 sq mi (0.00 km^{2})
- Elevation: 594 ft (181 m)

Population (2020)
  - Total: 337
  - Estimate (2024): 321 ▼
  - Density: 924.0/sq mi (356.75/km^{2})
- Time zone: UTC-6 (CST)
  - Summer (DST): UTC-5 (CDT)
- ZIP code: 62077
- Area code: 217
- FIPS code: 17-57498
- GNIS feature ID: 2399617

Panama is a village in Montgomery and Bond counties, Illinois, United States. The population was 337 at the 2020 census.

== History ==
The town was founded in the early 20th century when the Shoal Creek Coal Company of Chicago sank a coal mine shaft there. The shaft was completed in 1906. The town attracted many European immigrants.

== Geography ==
Panama is located on the border between Bond and Montgomery counties. It is 11 miles (18 km) south of Hillsboro, the Montgomery County seat, and 16 miles (26 km) northwest of Greenville, the Bond County seat.

According to the U.S. Census Bureau, Panama has a total area of 0.37 square miles (0.96 km^{2}), of which 0.002 square miles (0.005 km^{2}), or 0.54%, are water. The village sits on a low ridge between Shoal Creek to the west and its tributary Bearcat Creek to the east. Shoal Creek is a south-flowing tributary of the Kaskaskia River.

Two-thirds of the village is in Montgomery County, with the remainder in Bond County. Local law enforcement is dispatched through the Montgomery County Sheriff's Office in Hillsboro.

== Demographics ==
Historical population
Census	Pop.	Note	%±
1910	708		—
1920	1,281		80.9%
1930	1,026		−19.9%
1940	627		−38.9%
1950	520		−17.1%
1960	487		−6.3%
1970	423		−13.1%
1980	637		50.6%
1990	294		−53.8%
2000	323		9.9%
2010	343		6.2%
2020	337		−1.7%
U.S. Decennial Census

As of the 2020 census there were 337 people, 111 households, and 59 families residing in the village. The population density was 918.26 inhabitants per square mile (354.54/km^{2}). There were 163 housing units at an average density of 444.14 per square mile (171.48/km^{2}). The racial makeup of the village was 93.77% White, 0.59% Asian, 1.78% from other races, and 3.86% from two or more races. Hispanic or Latino of any race were 2.08% of the population.

There were 111 households, out of which 18.0% had children under the age of 18 living with them, 39.64% were married couples living together, 10.81% had a female householder with no husband present, and 46.85% were non-families. 35.14% of all households were made up of individuals, and 15.32% had someone living alone who was 65 years of age or older. The average household size was 2.66 and the average family size was 1.99.

The village's age distribution consisted of 18.1% under the age of 18, 5.0% from 18 to 24, 23% from 25 to 44, 28% from 45 to 64, and 25.8% who were 65 years of age or older. The median age was 50.5 years. For every 100 females, there were 87.3 males. For every 100 females age 18 and over, there were 79.2 males.

The median income for a household in the village was $55,114, and the median income for a family was $57,083. Males had a median income of $37,500 versus $25,938 for females. The per capita income for the village was $26,720. About 8.5% of families and 10.4% of the population were below the poverty line, including 10.0% of those under age 18 and 12.3% of those age 65 or over.

== Notable person ==
- John L. Lewis, nationally known union organizer, coal miner in Panama (1909–1915)
