= Shoal Creek Township, Illinois =

Shoal Creek Township
- Township
- Location in Bond County

- Bond County's location in Illinois
- Coordinates: 38°58′30″N 89°33′36″W
- Country: United States
- State: Illinois
- County: Bond
- Settlement: November 6, 1888

Area
  - Total: 58.25 sq mi (150.9 km^{2})
  - Land: 58.23 sq mi (150.8 km^{2})
  - Water: 0.02 sq mi (0.052 km^{2}) 0.03%
- Elevation: 531 ft (162 m)

Population (2020)
  - Total: 1,610
  - Density: 27.6/sq mi (10.7/km^{2})
- Time zone: UTC-6 (CST)
  - Summer (DST): UTC-5 (CDT)
- ZIP codes: 62019, 62074, 62086, 62246, 62275
- FIPS code: 17-005-69641

Shoal Creek Township is one of nine townships in Bond County, Illinois, USA. As of the 2020 census, its population was 1,610 and it contained 741 housing units.

== Geography ==
According to the 2010 census, the township has a total area of 58.25 square miles (150.9 km^{2}), of which 58.23 square miles (150.8 km^{2}) (or 99.97%) is land and 0.02 square miles (0.052 km^{2}) (or 0.03%) is water.

=== Cities ===
- Donnellson (southwest quarter)
- Panama (south half)
- Sorento

=== Unincorporated towns ===
- Reno

=== Cemeteries ===
The township contains these seven cemeteries: Bethel, Coyle, Peterson, Sunny Side, Tisdale, Union and Wade.

=== Major highways ===
- Illinois State Route 127

=== Airports and landing strips ===
- Mueller Airport

== Demographics ==
As of the 2020 census there were 1,610 people, 555 households, and 341 families residing in the township. The population density was 27.63 inhabitants per square mile (10.67/km^{2}). There were 741 housing units at an average density of 12.72 per square mile (4.91/km^{2}). The racial makeup of the township was 94.47% White, 0.25% African American, 0.25% Native American, 0.00% Asian, 0.00% Pacific Islander, 0.31% from other races, and 4.72% from two or more races. Hispanic or Latino of any race were 1.74% of the population.

There were 555 households, out of which 26.70% had children under the age of 18 living with them, 53.33% were married couples living together, 6.67% had a female householder with no spouse present, and 38.56% were non-families. 35.30% of all households were made up of individuals, and 16.40% had someone living alone who was 65 years of age or older. The average household size was 2.44 and the average family size was 3.18.

The township's age distribution consisted of 19.0% under the age of 18, 2.7% from 18 to 24, 22.8% from 25 to 44, 36.6% from 45 to 64, and 19.1% who were 65 years of age or older. The median age was 50.4 years. For every 100 females, there were 105.6 males. For every 100 females age 18 and over, there were 98.2 males.

The median income for a household in the township was $50,795, and the median income for a family was $68,828. Males had a median income of $51,579 versus $29,766 for females. The per capita income for the township was $25,485. About 4.1% of families and 10.1% of the population were below the poverty line, including 7.3% of those under age 18 and 13.6% of those age 65 or over.

Historical population
Census	Pop.	Note	%±
2010	1,783		—
2020	1,610		−9.7%
U.S. Decennial Census

== School districts ==
- Bond County Community Unit School District 2
- Highland Community Unit School District 5
- Hillsboro Community Unit School District 3

== Political districts ==
- Illinois' 19th congressional district
- State House District 102
- State Senate District 51
