= William Pahlmann =

American interior designer (1900–1987)

- Born: December 12, 1900; Pleasant Mound, Illinois
- Died: November 6, 1987 (aged 86); Guadalajara, Mexico
- Occupation: Interior Designer
- Years active: 1931–1976

William Carroll Pahlmann (December 12, 1900 – November 6, 1987) was a New York-based, mid-twentieth-century interior designer who popularized the eclectic style of design. The eclectic style borrowed decorative elements from different time periods and countries and often used bold color combinations, varying textures, and a mixture of antique and modern furnishings. Pahlmann employed eclectic design principles to accommodate his customers’ personal taste preferences and stressed the importance of comfort, functionality, and adaptability in his work.

== Early life ==
William Pahlmann was born on December 12, 1900, in Pleasant Mound, Illinois. His father died when he was six, and the family relocated to San Antonio, Texas, where his mother ran a boardinghouse. At the age of ten, he began to draw freehand and showed an interest in flower-arranging at the local Baptist Church.

After completing high school, he accepted a job as a traveling salesman selling sewer pipe. While he was on the road, he completed a 48-lesson correspondence course from Arts and Decoration Magazine. He moved to New York in 1927 to study interior decoration at the New York School of Fine and Applied Arts, now the Parsons School of Design. Pahlmann helped pay his way through school as a dancer in Broadway musicals. In 1929, he was given a scholarship to study at Ecole Parsons à Paris (Parsons Paris School of Art and Design) in Paris, France.

== Early career ==
Upon his return to the United States in 1931, Seton Henry commissioned Pahlmann to decorate his eighteenth-century home, Pen Ryn, in Bensalem, Pennsylvania. Pahlmann’s extravagant design quickly garnered attention when the project was featured in Country Life magazine. Shortly after, he decorated a Manhattan apartment for Dorothy Paley, the first wife of William S. Paley, the founder of CBS. Although the ox-yoke headboard he designed for her bed attracted some criticism, the project helped to launch Pahlmann’s career.

=== Lord & Taylor ===
In 1936, Pahlmann was hired as the head of the interior decorating and home furnishings department at the Lord & Taylor department store in New York City by Walter Hoving. While in this position, Pahlmann helped to establish the model room as the premier method of advertising store merchandise. Although world’s fairs and museums already employed model rooms, stores had previously presented only vignettes of rooms to their customers. Pahlmann recognized that good interior decorating was also a form of good merchandising.

One of Pahlmann’s most outstanding model rooms was the highly publicized “Pahlmann Peruvian” in November 1941. Following Pahlmann’s five-week tour of South America, Lord & Taylor premiered six model rooms featuring modern and antique Peruvian-style furnishings. The most popular presentation of model rooms, Pahlmann Peruvian attracted 20,000 to 30,000 visitors per month. In addition, Pahlmann’s designs were translated into a line of fabric and rugs for F. Schumacher & Co.

Pahlmann maintained a close relationship with Hoving even after the latter’s departure from Lord & Taylor. He designed several Bonwit Teller department stores while the company was under Hoving’s leadership.

=== Military service ===
In 1942, Pahlmann left his position at Lord & Taylor and volunteered for the United States Army Air Corps. During the war he directed the Jefferson Barracks Camouflage School in St. Louis, Missouri. In a 1984 interview, he described one of his demonstrations of camouflage:

"We staged mock assaults on barracks and towns. I built a town in the south of France. We had great big two-story houses, all beautiful French architecture. Then we attacked the village, with recordings of bombs going off. And this is where the camouflage came in--with the pull of a string the whole house would collapse and reveal an anti-aircraft gun emplacement. It was all to deceive the eye, and quite a show."

Pahlmann resigned from the armed forces at the end of the war, having reached the rank of lieutenant colonel.

== Post-war career ==
Upon his return to civilian life, Pahlmann founded the design firm William Pahlmann Associates in New York City in 1946. In addition to residential designs, William Pahlmann Associates were involved in a variety of commercial projects, including department stores, restaurants, offices, hotels, showrooms, and university buildings. Most of William Pahlmann Associates’ clients came from the New York metropolitan area, but the firm also completed projects internationally in the Bahamas, Cuba, Venezuela, and Hong Kong. Among the firm’s more renowned projects were The Forum of the Twelve Caesars restaurant in Manhattan, the South Carolina Governor’s Mansion, and the Margaret Cousins residence in Dobbs Ferry, New York. Pahlmann also collaborated on the Four Seasons Restaurant in Manhattan with architect Philip Johnson and was the innovator behind the idea of changing the décor according to the seasons. At the time of its completion in 1959, the Four Seasons Restaurant was said to be the costliest restaurant ever constructed.

In addition to their work in interior decoration, William Pahlmann Associates were also involved in industrial design. The firm designed furniture, upholstery fabric, wall coverings, tile, and other decorative accessories for use in the home. In 1949, Pahlmann designed the Momentum line of furniture, which featured large, semi-pneumatic wheels that allowed even the heaviest pieces to be easily moved and rearranged. The 1952 Hastings Square line of furniture utilized small rubber casters to achieve mobility, but also provided sleek forms, clean lines, and warm tones to an increasingly discerning audience.

From 1971 to 1976, William Pahlmann Associates worked on designing interiors for three new buildings at Texas A&M University in College Station, Texas: a Theater Arts Center, a 12-story Conference tower, and the Memorial Student Center. After renovations to the Memorial Student Center were complete, many students objected to the new decorating scheme, finding the furnishings “too extravagant and inappropriate for the purpose of a student center.” A 1975 questionnaire issued by the campus newspaper found that ninety-two percent of respondents disliked the new furnishings, finding the space “stiff, formal, and unfriendly.” It was to be the firm’s final project. Following its completion, William Pahlmann retired.

=== "A Matter of Taste" ===
Pahlmann lectured extensively throughout his career and sought to share his design ideas with a wide audience. From 1962 to 1973, he wrote a syndicated, thrice-weekly column entitled “A Matter of Taste” that ran in newspapers across the country and in several Latin American countries. In his column, Pahlmann provided his audience with general information on taste and style and introduced them to the basic principles of good design. He often wrote about the importance of color, balance, and the incorporation of modern and traditional design elements. Despite the democratic nature of his lectures and columns, Pahlmann insisted the average person did not have the necessary skills to design a successful interior and should consult a professional if at all possible.

== Later years and death ==
Following his retirement, William Pahlmann spent most of his time at his homes in San Antonio, Texas, and Guadalajara, Mexico. He gave up his last New York City apartment in 1985. Suffering from arteriosclerosis for many years, Pahlmann died on November 6, 1987, in Guadalajara.

== Publications ==
- The Pahlmann Book of Interior Design [1958] Revised in two editions in 1960 and 1968

== Awards and honors ==
In 1964, William Pahlmann received the Elsie de Wolfe Award of the New York Chapter of the American Institute of Decorators. De Wolfe was credited with introducing interior decorating to the United States in early twentieth century. It was said when the award was given that “except for Elsie de Wolfe, no one has influenced American home decoration more than Mr. Pahlmann.”

Pahlmann was chairman of the board of the New York Chapter of the American Institute of Decorators (later the American Society of Interior Designers) and the first president of its Resource Council. He was later elected as a Fellow.

The department of architecture at Texas A&M University awards the William C. Pahlmann scholarship annually to graduate students in their final year.

== Research ==
Pahlmann’s personal papers are held at the Technical Reference Center at Texas A&M University in College Station, Texas.

The William Pahlmann Papers are available at the Hagley Museum & Library and while there are many materials from Pahlmann's earlier years and personal activities, the bulk of the records are from the office of William Pahlmann Associates during the three decades of its existence, 1946-1976.

== Sources ==
- Raimond, Gina Marie. 'A Matter of Taste:' The Interior Designer William C. Pahlmann and the Creation of an American Style in the Post-World War II Era. Masters Thesis, The Smithsonian Associates and the Corcoran College of Art and Design, 2010.
- http://www.nytimes.com/1987/11/11/obituaries/william-c-pahlmann-decorator-known-for-eclectic-designs-dies.html
- Smith, C. Ray. "William Pahlmann at 84; a birthday salute to a celebrated designer." Interior Design Dec. 1984: 192+. Academic OneFile. Web. 10 Aug. 2011.
- http://www.architecturaldigest.com/architects/legends/archive/pahlmann_article_012000
- http://www.msc.tamu.edu/facilities/history2.html
