= Woburn, Illinois =

- Unincorporated community
- Location within Illinois Location within the United States
- Coordinates: 38°57′31″N 89°20′47″W
- Country: United States
- State: Illinois
- County: Bond
- Elevation: 577 ft (176 m)
- Time zone: UTC-6 (Central (CST))
  - Summer (DST): UTC-5 (CDT)
- Area code: 618
- GNIS feature ID: 423327

Woburn is an unincorporated community in Bond County, Illinois, United States. Woburn is located near Governor Bond Lake, northwest of Mulberry Grove.
