= Reno, Illinois =

- Unincorporated community
- Location within Illinois Location within the United States
- Coordinates: 38°58′30″N 89°30′50″W
- Country: United States
- State: Illinois
- County: Bond
- Elevation: 574 ft (175 m)
- Time zone: UTC-6 (Central (CST))
  - Summer (DST): UTC-5 (CDT)
- Area code: 217
- GNIS feature ID: 423109

Reno is an unincorporated community in Bond County, Illinois. Reno is located along a railroad line southeast of Sorento.

== History ==
Reno was formally established in 1883 upon the construction of a nearby Jacksonville and Southwestern Railroad line and was previously known as Cottonwood Grove and Augusta. A post office in the community existed as early as 1851.
