= Pleasant Mound, Illinois =

- Unincorporated community
- Location within Illinois Location within the United States
- Coordinates: 38°51′47″N 89°17′25″W
- Country: United States
- State: Illinois
- County: Bond
- Elevation: 571 ft (174 m)
- Time zone: UTC-6 (Central (CST))
  - Summer (DST): UTC-5 (CDT)
- Area code: 618
- GNIS feature ID: 415870

Pleasant Mound is an unincorporated community in Bond County, Illinois, United States. Pleasant Mound is south-southwest of Mulberry Grove and east-southeast of Greenville.
