= Greenville Airport (Illinois) =

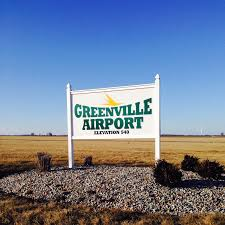
- IATA: GRE; ICAO: KGRE; FAA LID: GRE

Summary
- Airport type: Public
- Owner: Greenville Airport Authority
- Serves: Greenville, Illinois
- Elevation AMSL: 538 ft (164 m)
- Coordinates: 38°50′10″N 89°22′45″W

Map
- Location of airport in Illinois GRE (the United States)

Runways
Direction	Length		Surface
Direction	ft	m	Surface
18/36	4,002	1,220	Asphalt
9/27	2,822	860	Turf

Statistics (2015)
- Aircraft operations: 25,000
- Based aircraft: 50
- Source: Federal Aviation Administration

Greenville Airport (IATA: GRE, ICAO: KGRE, FAA LID: GRE) is a public airport located three miles (5 km) south of the central business district of Greenville, a city in Bond County, Illinois, United States. It is owned by the Greenville Airport Authority.

== Facilities and aircraft ==
Greenville Airport covers an area of 492 acres (199 ha) which contains two runways: 18/36 with a 4,002 x 75 ft (1,220 x 23 m) asphalt pavement and 9/27 with a 2,822 x 250 ft (860 x 76 m) turf surface. The airport is capable of handling most aircraft up through the Cessna Citation and Lear Jet class. The airport provides a lighted runway, rental hangars, mechanic service, and pilot service.

The airport has two fixed-base operators that sell fuel and offer a variety of amenities each.

For the 12-month period ending May 31, 2021, the airport had 25,000 aircraft operations, an average of 68 per day: 22,000 general aviation, 2,000 air taxi and 1,000 military. At that time there were 37 airplanes based at this airport: 36 single-engine airplanes and 1 multi-engine airplane.

== See also ==
- List of airports in Illinois
