= Stubblefield, Illinois =

- Unincorporated village
- Location within Illinois
- Coordinates: 38°50′54″N 89°27′59″W
- Country: United States
- State: Illinois
- County: Bond
- Elevation: 525 ft (160 m)
- Time zone: UTC-6 (Central (CST))
  - Summer (DST): UTC-5 (CDT)
- ZIP code: 62246
- Area code: 618
- GNIS feature ID: 423215

Stubblefield is an unincorporated village in Bond County, Illinois, United States. The community is served by an exit on Interstate 70. The nearest city to Stubblefield is Greenville.
