= Hookdale, Illinois =

- Unincorporated community
- Location within Illinois Location within the United States
- Coordinates: 38°49′35″N 89°18′41″W
- Country: United States
- State: Illinois
- County: Bond
- Elevation: 512 ft (156 m)
- Time zone: UTC-6 (Central (CST))
  - Summer (DST): UTC-5 (CDT)
- Area code: 618
- GNIS feature ID: 410491

Hookdale is an unincorporated community in Bond County, Illinois, United States. Hookdale is southeast of Greenville.

The town of Hookdale was originally known as Lehnville, for settler Louis Lehn. The town was platted in 1883 and received a post office in 1884, but in 1886 changed its name from Lehnville to Hookdale due to confusion with a similarly-named community in Sangamon County. The town received electricity in 1927.

Hookdale was a freight loading point on the Chicago, Burlington, and Quincy Railroad (now BNSF), centered on a grain elevator built in 1927. The elevator property also housed a lumber yard, barber shop, store, and dance hall in the 1930s and 40s. For a time it also housed the Hookdale post office, which later moved to a separate site before being discontinued in 1958. Hookdale is the site of a major natural gas storage field that contains gas underground during the low-demand season.
