= Dudleyville, Illinois =

- Unincorporated community
- Location within Illinois Location within the United States
- Coordinates: 38°49′26″N 89°25′05″W
- Country: United States
- State: Illinois
- County: Bond
- Elevation: 518 ft (158 m)
- Time zone: UTC-6 (Central (CST))
  - Summer (DST): UTC-5 (CDT)
- Area code: 618
- GNIS feature ID: 422639

Dudleyville is an unincorporated community in Bond County, Illinois, United States. Dudleyville is south of Greenville and near Greenville Airport.

== History ==
A post office was established at Dudleyville in 1861. It remained in operation until 1902. The community was named for John Dudley, the original owner of the town site.
