= WGEL =

Coordinates: 38°48′11″N 89°20′56″W

- Greenville, Illinois; United States
- Broadcast area: Vandalia, Illinois; Carlyle, Illinois
- Frequency: 101.7 MHz
- Branding: WGEL 101.7 FM

Programming
- Format: Country music

Ownership
- Owner: Bond Broadcasting Inc.

Technical information
- Licensing authority: FCC
- Facility ID: 6343
- Class: A
- ERP: 6,000 watts
- HAAT: 90 meters (300 ft)

Links
- Public license information: Public file; LMS
- Webcast: Listen live
- Website: wgel.com

WGEL (101.7 FM) is a radio station broadcasting a country music format, licensed to Greenville, Illinois. The station is owned by Bond Broadcasting Inc.
