= Elm Point, Missouri =

Unincorporated community in Missouri

Coordinates: 38°49′05″N 90°29′13″W

Elm Point is an unincorporated community in St. Charles County, in the U.S. state of Missouri.

== History ==
A post office called Elm Point was established in 1889, and remained in operation until 1891. The community was named for a grove of elm trees near the original town site.
