= Old Ripley, Illinois =

- Village
- Location of Ripley in Bond County and Illinois
- Coordinates: 38°53′34″N 89°34′20″W
- Country: United States
- State: Illinois
- County: Bond
- Township: Old Ripley
- Founded: 1814
- Incorporated: 1906

Area
  - Total: 0.15 sq mi (0.40 km^{2})
  - Land: 0.15 sq mi (0.40 km^{2})
  - Water: 0 sq mi (0.00 km^{2})
- Elevation: 558 ft (170 m)

Population (2020)
  - Total: 82
  - Estimate (2024): 80 ▼
  - Density: 531/sq mi (205.1/km^{2})
- Time zone: UTC-6 (CST)
  - Summer (DST): UTC-5 (CDT)
- ZIP code: 62275
- Area code: 618
- FIPS code: 17-55717
- GNIS feature ID: 2399568

Old Ripley is a village in Old Ripley Township, Bond County, Illinois, United States. The population was 82 at the 2020 census.

== History ==
Old Ripley was once called New Berlin and was then called Ripley. Old Ripley was founded in 1814 by the Wheelock brothers and was incorporated as a village in 1906.

== Geography ==
According to the 2021 census gazetteer files, Old Ripley has a total area of 0.15 square miles (0.39 km^{2}), all land.

== Demographics ==
Historical population
Census	Pop.	Note	%±
1880	166		—
1910	146		—
1920	119		−18.5%
1930	98		−17.6%
1940	113		15.3%
1950	135		19.5%
1960	150		11.1%
1970	127		−15.3%
1980	149		17.3%
1990	95		−36.2%
2000	127		33.7%
2010	108		−15.0%
2020	82		−24.1%
U.S. Decennial Census

As of the 2020 census there were 82 people, 30 households, and 24 families residing in the village. The population density was 532.47 inhabitants per square mile (205.59/km^{2}). There were 44 housing units at an average density of 285.71 per square mile (110.31/km^{2}). The racial makeup of the village was 96.34% White, and 3.66% from two or more races. None of the population was Hispanic or Latino.

There were 30 households, out of which 43.3% had children under the age of 18 living with them, 56.67% were married couples living together, and 20.00% were non-families. 20.00% of all households were made up of individuals, and 6.67% had someone living alone who was 65 years of age or older. The average household size was 2.96 and the average family size was 2.63.

The village's age distribution consisted of 20.3% under the age of 18, 1.3% from 18 to 24, 45.6% from 25 to 44, 17.8% from 45 to 64, and 15.2% who were 65 years of age or older. The median age was 30.9 years. For every 100 females, there were 119.4 males. For every 100 females age 18 and over, there were 110.0 males.

The median income for a household in the village was $69,167, and the median income for a family was $73,214. Males had a median income of $43,750 versus $28,750 for females. The per capita income for the village was $24,977. None of the population was below the poverty line.
