= Illinois Route 143 =

State highway in southwestern Illinois, US

Illinois Route 143
- IL 143 highlighted in red

Route information
- Maintained by IDOT
- Length: 47.96 mi (77.18 km)
- Existed: 1937–present

Major junctions
- West end: US 67 in Alton
- I-55 in Edwardsville; I-70 in Marine; US 40 in Highland
- East end: IL 127 in Tamalco

Location
- Country: United States
- State: Illinois
- Counties: Madison, Bond

Highway system
- Illinois State Highway System; Interstate; US; State; Tollways; Scenic
← IL 142	→ IL 145

Illinois Route 143 is an east–west state highway in southwestern Illinois. Its western terminus is at U.S. Route 67 (very near, but not at the termini of Illinois Route 100 and Illinois Route 140) in Alton. Its eastern terminus at Illinois Route 127 at a rural intersection west of Tamalco. This is a distance of 47.96 miles (77.18 km).

== Route description ==
Illinois 143 overlaps Illinois Route 157 and Illinois Route 159 in Edwardsville, and Illinois Route 160 and U.S. Route 40 in Highland. It has 4 lanes from IL 140 to just east of Illinois Route 255, a portion from around Southern Illinois University Edwardsville to Edwardsville, and briefly around Interstate 55 in Edwardsville. The rest of the road is generally rural and has 2 lanes.

== History ==
SBI Route 143 ran from Benton to Harrisburg; this was replaced by Illinois Route 34 when it was extended north in 1937. That same year, IL 143 was applied to a former lettered route, Illinois Route 127A from Highland to Illinois 127. In 1950, it was extended west to Edwardsville. In 1964, it was extended west again to Alton, replacing Illinois Route 159. There have been no changes since.

In 1987, the alignments of Illinois Route 3, Illinois Route 100, and Illinois Route 143 were switched to their current routes in the Alton area with the opening of the extension of the Homer M. Adams Parkway and the construction of Madison Avenue in Wood River. IL 143 was put on the new Madison Avenue alignment and routed on the Berm Highway, while IL 3 was put back on an older alignment through East Alton and the Homer Adams Parkway (later taking over the old IL 100 alignment north of Godfrey to Grafton), and IL 100 was put on then-unmarked River Road from Alton to Grafton. The old alignment of IL 143 (Alton-Edwardsville Road) became unmarked.

== Major Intersections ==
County	Location	mi	km	Destinations	Notes
Madison	Alton	0.0	0.0	US 67 / Great River Road north – Godfrey, St. Louis	Western terminus of IL 143; west end of Great River Road concurrency
Madison	Alton	0.1	0.16	IL 140 east (Broadway Connector) – Bethalto	Western terminus of IL 140
Madison	Wood River	4.2	6.8	IL 3 (Lewis and Clark Blvd) / Great River Road south – Granite City, East Alton	East end of Great River Road concurrency
Madison	Wood River	5.8	9.3	IL 111 (Central Ave)	
Madison	Roxana	7.5	12.1	IL 255 – Alton, To I-270	IL 255 exit 6
Madison	Edwardsville	12.2	19.6	IL 159 north – Bunker Hill	West end of IL 159 concurrency
Madison	Edwardsville	13.5	21.7	IL 157 south (Vandalia St) / IL 159 south (Main St)	East end of IL 159 concurrency; west end of IL 157 concurrency
Madison	Edwardsville	14.0	22.5	IL 157 north	East end of IL 157 concurrency
Madison	Edwardsville	17.3	27.8	I-55 – Springfield, East St. Louis	I-55 exit 23
Madison		22.5	36.2	IL 4 – Staunton, Lebanon	
Madison		25.8	41.5	I-70 – Effingham, East St. Louis	I-70 exit 24
Madison	Highland	30.0	48.3	US 40 west – East St. Louis	West end of US 40 concurrency
Madison	Highland	30.5	49.1	IL 160 north	West end of IL& 160 concurrency
Madison	Highland	31.1	50.1	IL 160 south (Sycamore St) – Trenton	East end of IL 160 concurrency
Madison		33.6	54.1	US 40 east – Vandalia, St. Louis	East end of US 40 concurrency
Bond		47.96	77.18	IL 127 – Greenville, Carlyle	Eastern terminus of IL 143
1.000 mi = 1.609 km; 1.000 km = 0.621 mi: Concurrency terminus
