= Tamalco, Illinois =

- Unincorporated community
- Location within Illinois Location within the United States
- Coordinates: 38°46′15″N 89°17′29″W
- Country: United States
- State: Illinois
- County: Bond
- Elevation: 479 ft (146 m)
- Time zone: UTC-6 (Central (CST))
  - Summer (DST): UTC-5 (CDT)
- Area code: 618
- GNIS feature ID: 419529

Tamalco is an unincorporated community in Bond County, Illinois, United States. Tamalco is located along a railroad line northwest of Keyesport.

The community was named in 1884 as a portmanteau of the names of Bond County residents W. H. Taylor, John McLaren, and Frank Colwell. Its post office opened the same year; Taylor served as the first postmaster.
