= Donnellson, Illinois =

- Village
- Location in Montgomery and Bond counties, Illinois
- Coordinates: 39°01′50″N 89°28′32″W
- Country: United States
- State: Illinois
- Counties: Montgomery, Bond
- Townships: Grisham, East Fork, Shoal Creek
- Founded: c. 1858
- Incorporated: 1897

Area
  - Total: 0.37 sq mi (0.96 km^{2})
  - Land: 0.37 sq mi (0.96 km^{2})
  - Water: 0 sq mi (0.00 km^{2})
- Elevation: 617 ft (188 m)

Population (2020)
  - Total: 153
  - Estimate (2024): 150 ▼
  - Density: 413.6/sq mi (159.69/km^{2})
- Time zone: UTC-6 (CST)
  - Summer (DST): UTC-5 (CDT)
- ZIP code: 62019
- Area code: 217
- FIPS code: 17-20318
- GNIS ID: 2398737
- Website: www.villageofdonnellson.com

Donnellson is a village in Montgomery and Bond counties, Illinois, United States. The population was 153 as of the 2020 census, down from 210 in 2010.

== History ==
Donnellson was laid out ca. 1858. The village's name honors Thomas Carson Donnell, an early settler. Donnellson was incorporated as a village in 1897.

== Geography ==
Donnellson is mainly in Montgomery County, with a small portion extending south into Bond County. Illinois Route 127 passes through the village center as Washington Street, leading north 9 miles (14 km) to Hillsboro, the Montgomery County seat, and south 11 miles (18 km) to Greenville, the Bond County seat.

According to the U.S. Census Bureau, Donnellson has a total area of 0.37 square miles (0.96 km^{2}), all land. The village drains south to the headwaters of Yankee Creek, a southwest-flowing tributary of Shoal Creek and part of the Kaskaskia River watershed.

== Demographics ==
Historical population
| Census | Pop. | Note | %± |
|---|---|---|---|
| 1900 | 268 | | — |
| 1910 | 405 | | 51.1% |
| 1920 | 403 | | −0.5% |
| 1930 | 452 | | 12.2% |
| 1940 | 356 | | −21.2% |
| 1950 | 336 | | −5.6% |
| 1960 | 292 | | −13.1% |
| 1970 | 311 | | 6.5% |
| 1980 | 256 | | −17.7% |
| 1990 | 167 | | −34.8% |
| 2000 | 243 | | 45.5% |
| 2010 | 210 | | −13.6% |
| 2020 | 153 | | −27.1% |
U.S. Decennial Census

As of the 2020 census there were 153 people, 70 households, and 44 families residing in the village. The population density was 413.51 inhabitants per square mile (159.66/km^{2}). There were 87 housing units at an average density of 235.14 per square mile (90.79/km^{2}). The racial makeup of the village was 87.58% White, 1.31% Asian, and 11.11% from two or more races. Hispanic or Latino of any race were 1.31% of the population.

There were 70 households, out of which 15.7% had children under the age of 18 living with them, 24.29% were married couples living together, 14.29% had a female householder with no husband present, and 37.14% were non-families. 35.71% of all households were made up of individuals, and 20.00% had someone living alone who was 65 years of age or older. The average household size was 1.82 and the average family size was 1.63.

The village's age distribution consisted of 7.9% under the age of 18, 1.8% from 18 to 24, 26.3% from 25 to 44, 35% from 45 to 64, and 28.9% who were 65 years of age or older. The median age was 54.0 years. For every 100 females, there were 96.6 males. For every 100 females age 18 and over, there were 105.9 males.

Males had a median income of $50,313 versus $34,375 for females. The per capita income for the village was $18,109. About 47.7% of families and 49.1% of the population were below the poverty line, including 55.6% of those under age 18 and 36.4% of those age 65 or over.
