= Illinois Route 140 =

State highway in Illinois, United States

Illinois Route 140
- IL 140 highlighted in red

Route information
- Maintained by IDOT
- Length: 52.05 mi (83.77 km)
- Existed: 1935–present

Major junctions
- West end: IL 143 in Alton
- I-55 in Hamel
- East end: US 40 near Mulberry Grove

Location
- Country: United States
- State: Illinois
- Counties: Madison, Bond, Fayette

Highway system
- Illinois State Highway System; Interstate; US; State; Tollways; Scenic
← IL 138	→ IL 141

Illinois Route 140 (IL 140) is a 52.05-mile-long (83.77 km) east–west highway with its western terminus at Illinois Route 143 in Alton and its eastern terminus at U.S. Route 40 (US 40) near Mulberry Grove. It also overlaps IL 111 in Alton and IL 127 in Greenville.

Although this route may appear to be a derivative of US 40, it does not follow any of the old US 40 alignment except for a portion of the Historic National Road in Fayette County from US 40 to Vandalia. IDOT has since truncated the eastern end of Route 140 to the town of Mulberry Grove with the intersection of US 40.

In 2007, IDOT decommissioned the portion of Route 140 from near the Bond and Fayette County line at Mulberry Grove, east to Vandalia. While that section of highway is no longer marked for Route 140, the state still maintains its Historic National Road signage.

== Route description ==
Route 140 begins at a junction with Route 143 in Alton. The route heads northeast through Alton to a junction with Illinois Route 3 and Illinois Route 111. From this junction, Route 140 heads east concurrently with Route 111. The highways run along the northern border of East Alton before entering Bethalto, where they meet Illinois Route 255. Shortly past the junction, Route 111 turns south, while Route 140 continues east, passing to the north of St. Louis Regional Airport. The highway runs through a rural area of Madison County, where it passes through the community of Meadowbrook and then intersects Illinois Route 159. As of 2026, the section traveling through Meadowbrook is designated the Cpl. Tommy N. Miller Memorial Highway, following legislation passed by the Illinois General Assembly and sponsored by State Representative Amy Elik. The road then enters the village of Hamel, where it intersects Illinois Route 157 and Interstate 55. Past Hamel, the route crosses Illinois Route 4 before passing through Alhambra. The highway then intersects Illinois Route 160 before entering Bond County.

In Bond County, the route passes through farmland and runs south of Old Ripley. Past Old Ripley, the highway meets Illinois Route 127; the two highways overlap until Route 127 turns south at the western edge of Greenville. Route 140 continues east through northern Greenville, passing Greenville Regional Hospital. After leaving Greenville, the route heads east until turning north at an intersection north of Smithboro. The highway then heads east-northeast toward Mulberry Grove, parallel to and north of U.S. Route 40. In Mulberry Grove, the route enters along Wall Street before turning north along Maple Street. The highway then turns east along Main Street before leaving the village and entering Fayette County. The highway terminates east of Mulberry Grove at a junction with US 40.

== Major intersections ==
County	Location	mi	km	Destinations	Notes
Madison	Alton	0.0	0.0	IL 143 (River Heritage Parkway / Landmarks Boulevard) to US 67	Western terminus of IL 140
Madison	Alton	3.0	4.8	IL 3 (Homer M Adams Parkway) / IL 111 north – Granite City, Grafton, Godfrey	Interchange; west end of IL 111 concurrency
Madison	Bethalto	6.6	10.6	IL 255 – To I-270, Godfrey	IL 255 exit 10
Madison	Bethalto	6.9	11.1	IL 111 south (Bellwood Drive)	East end of IL 111 concurrency
Madison		11.9	19.2	IL 159	
Madison	Hamel	18.6	29.9	Historic US 66 / IL 157 south	Northern terminus of IL 157
Madison	Hamel	18.9	30.4	I-55 – East St. Louis, Springfield	I-55 exit 30
Madison		20.9	33.6	IL 4	
Madison		28.0	45.1	IL 160 south	Northern terminus of IL 160
Bond		40.7	65.5	IL 127 north	West end of IL 127 concurrency
Bond	Greenville	41.7	67.1	IL 127 south (6th Street)	East end of IL 127 concurrency
Bond	Greenville			Historic National Road (Beaumont Avenue)	
Fayette		51.9	83.5	US 40 / Historic National Road	Eastern terminus of IL 140
1.000 mi = 1.609 km; 1.000 km = 0.621 mi: Concurrency terminus

== See also ==
- List of state routes in Illinois
