= Smithboro, Illinois =

- Village
- Location of Illinois in the United States
- Coordinates: 38°53′40″N 89°20′24″W
- Country: United States
- State: Illinois
- County: Bond
- Township: Pleasant Mound
- Founded: 1870
- Incorporated: 1889
- Named after: Henry H. Smith

Government
  - Village president: Bill Archibald

Area
  - Total: 0.93 sq mi (2.41 km^{2})
  - Land: 0.93 sq mi (2.41 km^{2})
  - Water: 0 sq mi (0.00 km^{2}) 0%
- Elevation: 551 ft (168 m)

Population (2020)
  - Total: 154
  - Estimate (2024): 151 ▼
  - Density: 165.3/sq mi (63.82/km^{2})
- Time zone: UTC-6 (CST)
  - Summer (DST): UTC-5 (CDT)
- ZIP Code(s): 62284
- Area code: 618
- FIPS code: 17-70213
- GNIS feature ID: 2399829
- Wikimedia Commons: Smithboro, Illinois

Smithboro is a village in Pleasant Mound Township, Bond County, Illinois, United States. The population was 154 at the 2020 census.

== History ==
Smithboro, founded in 1870, was once called "Henderson Station" and was renamed after Henry H. Smith, the town's founder postmaster. The town name was spelled "Smithborough" until 1893. The town was incorporated as a village in 1889.

Smithboro and its immediate area was evacuated on December 27, 1981, for a day after a train derailment, affecting 200 people. 22 of 84 trail cars derailed; dichlorodifluromethane and phosphoryl chloride were leaked. Residents were able to return the next day, after cleanup and rail traffic was redirected to a temporary track.

== Geography ==
Smithboro is located at 38°53′47″N 89°20′29″W (38.896290, -89.341451).

According to the 2021 census gazetteer files, Smithboro has a total area of 0.93 square miles (2.41 km^{2}), all land.

== Demographics ==
Historical population
| Census | Pop. | Note | %± |
|---|---|---|---|
| 1880 | 40 | | — |
| 1890 | 393 | | 882.5% |
| 1900 | 314 | | −20.1% |
| 1910 | 301 | | −4.1% |
| 1920 | 277 | | −8.0% |
| 1930 | 222 | | −19.9% |
| 1940 | 222 | | 0.0% |
| 1950 | 253 | | 14.0% |
| 1960 | 213 | | −15.8% |
| 1970 | 203 | | −4.7% |
| 1980 | 236 | | 16.3% |
| 1990 | 201 | | −14.8% |
| 2000 | 200 | | −0.5% |
| 2010 | 177 | | −11.5% |
| 2020 | 154 | | −13.0% |
U.S. Decennial Census

As of the 2020 census there were 154 people, 75 households, and 48 families residing in the village. The population density was 165.24 inhabitants per square mile (63.80/km^{2}). There were 73 housing units at an average density of 78.33 per square mile (30.24/km^{2}). The racial makeup of the village was 95.45% White and 4.55% from two or more races. Hispanic or Latino of any race were 1.30% of the population.

There were 75 households, out of which 45.3% had children under the age of 18 living with them, 25.33% were married couples living together, 18.67% had a female householder with no husband present, and 36.00% were non-families. 29.33% of all households were made up of individuals, and 12.00% had someone living alone who was 65 years of age or older. The average household size was 3.35 and the average family size was 2.87.

The village's age distribution consisted of 35.8% under the age of 18, 3.7% from 18 to 24, 31.6% from 25 to 44, 20% from 45 to 64, and 8.8% who were 65 years of age or older. The median age was 29.7 years. For every 100 females, there were 124.0 males. For every 100 females age 18 and over, there were 122.6 males.

The median income for a household in the village was $45,625, and the median income for a family was $51,563. Males had a median income of $51,250 versus $26,250 for females. The per capita income for the village was $18,185. About 14.6% of families and 21.9% of the population were below the poverty line, including 19.4% of those under age 18 and 15.8% of those age 65 or over.
