= Mulberry Grove, Illinois =

- Village
- Location of Mulberry Grove in Bond County and Illinois
- Coordinates: 38°55′28″N 89°15′58″W
- Country: United States
- State: Illinois
- County: Bond
- Township: Mulberry Grove
- Platted: 1841
- Incorporated: 1857

Area
  - Total: 1.03 sq mi (2.66 km^{2})
  - Land: 1.02 sq mi (2.63 km^{2})
  - Water: 0.0077 sq mi (0.02 km^{2})
- Elevation: 548 ft (167 m)

Population (2020)
  - Total: 520
  - Estimate (2024): 499 ▼
  - Density: 511.9/sq mi (197.64/km^{2})
- Time zone: UTC-6 (CST)
  - Summer (DST): UTC-5 (CDT)
- ZIP code: 62262
- Area code: 618
- FIPS code: 17-51284
- GNIS feature ID: 2399424
- Website: mulberrygroveil.org

Mulberry Grove is a village in Mulberry Grove Township, Bond County, Illinois, United States. The population was 520 at the 2020 census.

== History ==
Mulberry Grove has existed under the names Bucktown, Houston and Shakerag. A post office was established in 1834.

In 1841, Mulberry Grove was platted by Francis Gill. Mulberry Grove was incorporated as a village in 1857.

== Geography ==
Mulberry Grove is located along Illinois Route 140 approximately one mile north of I-70. Greenville lies about seven miles to the west-southwest and Vandalia is about nine miles to the east-northeast. Owl Creek flows past the north side of town and joins Hurricane Creek about 1.5 mile to the east in adjacent Fayette County.

According to the 2021 census gazetteer files, Mulberry Grove has a total area of 1.03 square miles (2.67 km^{2}), of which 1.02 square miles (2.64 km^{2}) (or 99.12%) is land and 0.01 square miles (0.03 km^{2}) (or 0.88%) is water.

== Demographics ==
Historical population
Census	Pop.	Note	%±
1900	632		—
1910	716		13.3%
1920	725		1.3%
1930	596		−17.8%
1940	702		17.8%
1950	712		1.4%
1960	745		4.6%
1970	697		−6.4%
1980	707		1.4%
1990	660		−6.6%
2000	671		1.7%
2010	634		−5.5%
2020	520		−18.0%
U.S. Decennial Census

As of the 2020 census there were 520 people, 344 households, and 175 families residing in the village. The population density was 507.32 inhabitants per square mile (195.88/km^{2}). There were 268 housing units at an average density of 261.46 per square mile (100.95/km^{2}). The racial makeup of the village was 93.08% White, 1.35% African American, 0.38% Native American, 0.00% Asian, 0.00% Pacific Islander, 0.38% from other races, and 4.81% from two or more races. Hispanic or Latino of any race were 0.96% of the population.

There were 344 households, out of which 29.1% had children under the age of 18 living with them, 40.70% were married couples living together, 1.16% had a female householder with no husband present, and 49.13% were non-families. 43.90% of all households were made up of individuals, and 26.45% had someone living alone who was 65 years of age or older. The average household size was 3.46 and the average family size was 2.46.

The village's age distribution consisted of 26.9% under the age of 18, 8.3% from 18 to 24, 27.7% from 25 to 44, 18.5% from 45 to 64, and 18.5% who were 65 years of age or older. The median age was 35.2 years. For every 100 females, there were 95.2 males. For every 100 females age 18 and over, there were 124.3 males.

The median income for a household in the village was $40,800, and the median income for a family was $46,823. Males had a median income of $34,063 versus $18,194 for females. The per capita income for the village was $19,672. About 14.3% of families and 31.3% of the population were below the poverty line, including 36.4% of those under age 18 and 35.7% of those age 65 or over.
