= Sorento, Illinois =

- Village
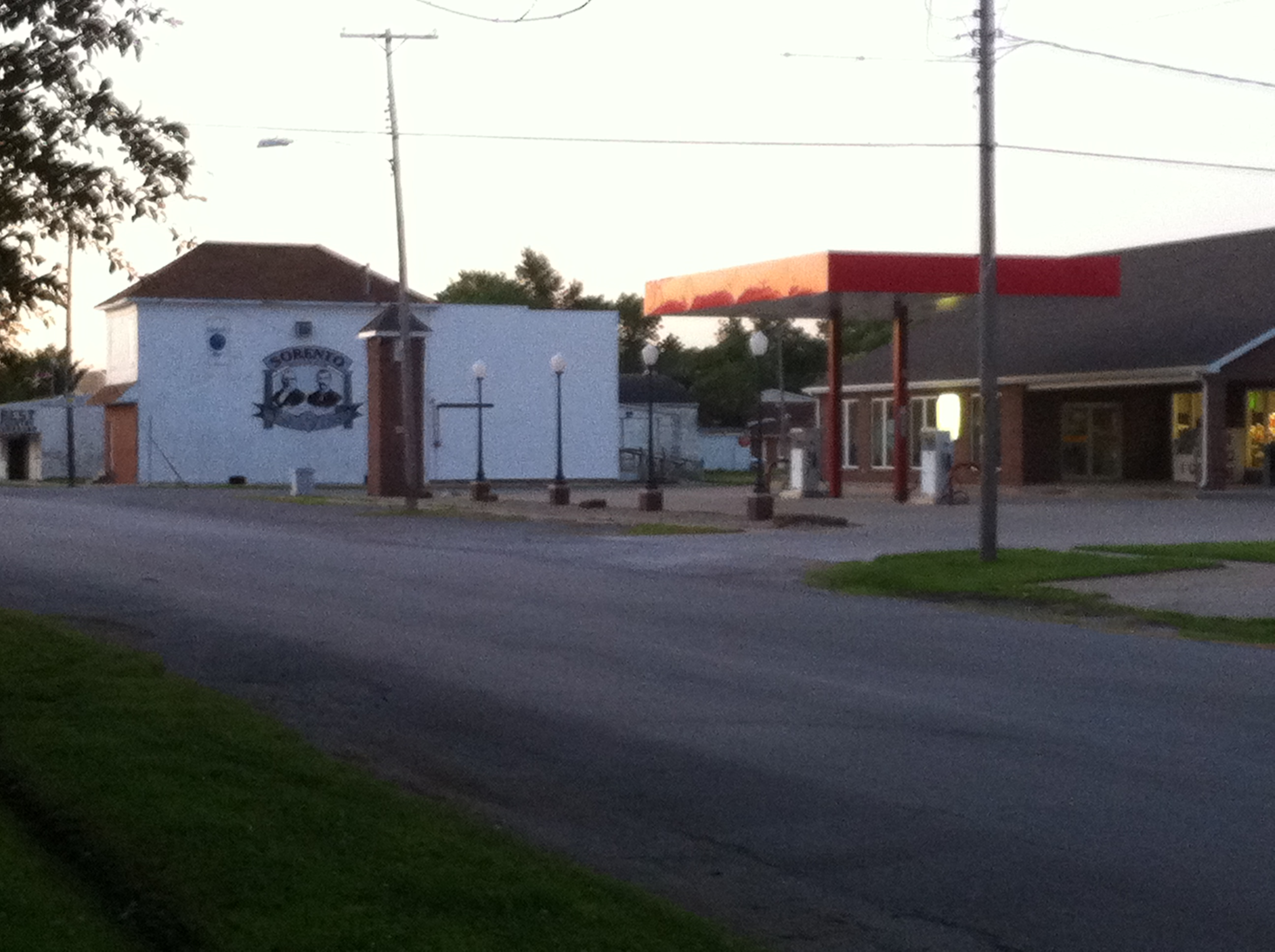
- Downtown Sorento, IL on June 14, 2014

- Location of Illinois in the United States
- Coordinates: 38°59′51″N 89°34′29″W
- Country: United States
- State: Illinois
- County: Bond
- Township: Shoal Creek
- Founded: August 15, 1882
- Named after: Sorrento, Florida

Government
  - Village president: Anthony Rapien

Area
  - Total: 0.80 sq mi (2.07 km^{2})
  - Land: 0.80 sq mi (2.07 km^{2})
  - Water: 0 sq mi (0.00 km^{2})
- Elevation: 584 ft (178 m)

Population (2020)
  - Total: 429
  - Estimate (2024): 409 ▼
  - Density: 537.9/sq mi (207.67/km^{2})
- Time zone: UTC-6 (CST)
  - Summer (DST): UTC-5 (CDT)
- ZIP Code(s): 62086
- Area code: 217
- FIPS code: 17-70525
- GNIS feature ID: 2399839
- Wikimedia Commons: Sorento, Illinois

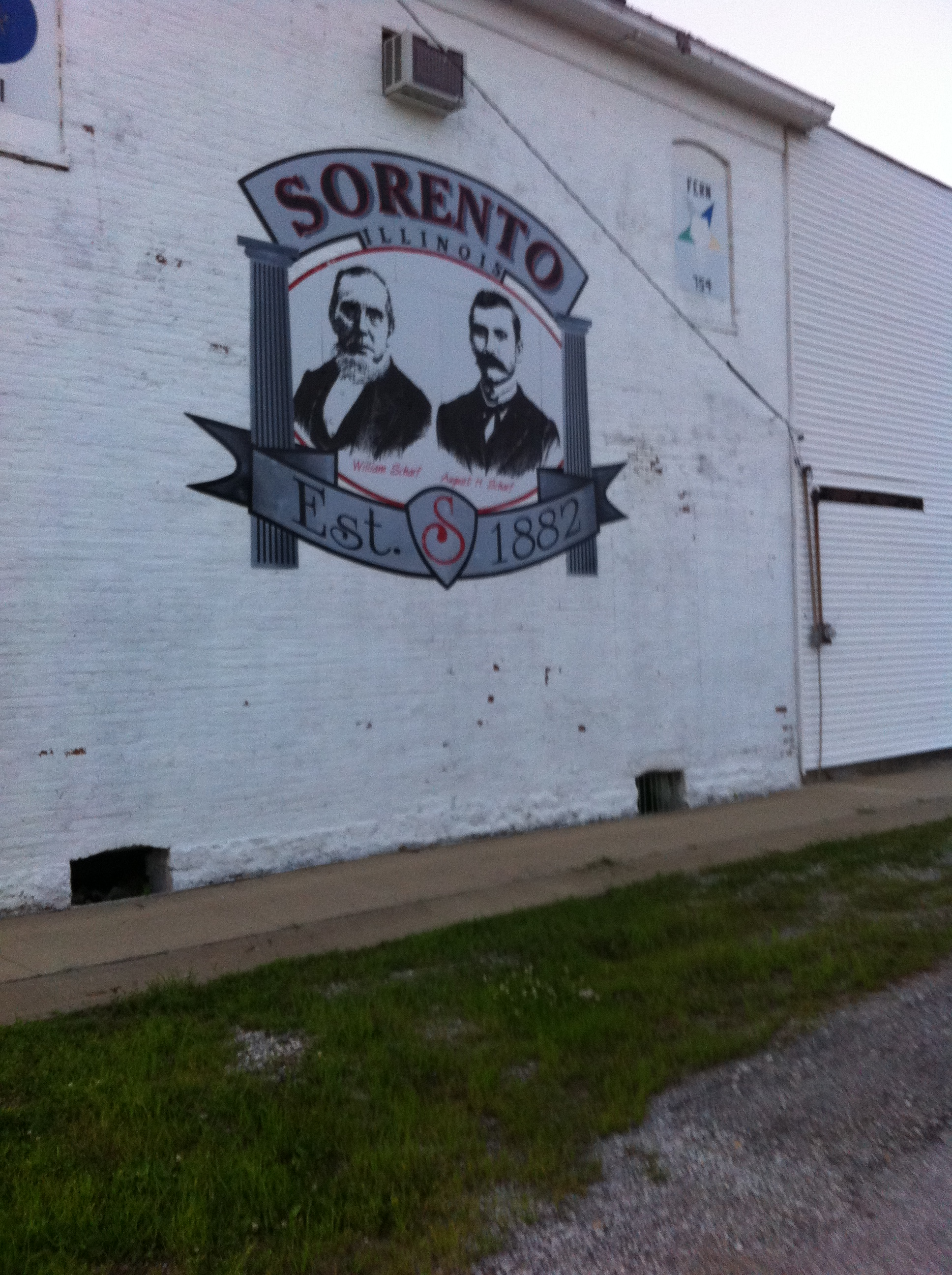
Side of Masonic Lodge in Downtown Sorento, IL

Sorento is a village in Shoal Creek Township, Bond County, Illinois, United States. The population was 429 at the 2020 census. Sorento is part of the St. Louis Metropolitan Statistical Area. It is also considered part of the Metro East region of Illinois.

== History ==
Sorento was founded as a village in 1882. The town was laid out and platted on August 15, 1882, by August H. Scharf, a local farmer and businessman, and his father, William Scharf. They named the town Sorento after Sorrento, Florida, a town they had once visited. The town grew quickly and by the end of 1883 there were over 500 residents.

The Sorento Coal Mine opened in 1883 and was in operation until March 31, 1914.

=== Historic bridge ===
Ripson Bridge was built in 1895. It is the last pony truss bridge in Bond County and is a local historical landmark that crosses Shoal Creek. The bridge is named after the owner of the property next to the bridge when it was built. The Sorento Homecoming Association was the caretaker of the bridge from the mid-1980s to about 2019. Initially, the Sorento Homecoming Association applied to have Ripson Bridge added to the National Register of Historic Places. However, that process has stopped and the bridge is now owned by private owners.

== Geography ==
According to the 2021 census gazetteer files, Sorento has a total area of 0.80 square miles (2.07 km^{2}), all land.

== Demographics ==
Historical population
Census	Pop.	Note	%±
1890	538		—
1900	1,000		85.9%
1910	1,018		1.8%
1920	942		−7.5%
1930	831		−11.8%
1940	840		1.1%
1950	692		−17.6%
1960	681		−1.6%
1970	625		−8.2%
1980	677		8.3%
1990	596		−12.0%
2000	601		0.8%
2010	498		−17.1%
2020	429		−13.9%
U.S. Decennial Census

As of the 2020 census there were 429 people, 216 households, and 114 families residing in the village. The population density was 537.59 inhabitants per square mile (207.56/km^{2}). There were 201 housing units at an average density of 251.88 per square mile (97.25/km^{2}). The racial makeup of the village was 91.38% White, 0.70% African American, 0.23% Native American, 0.70% from other races, and 6.99% from two or more races. Hispanic or Latino of any race were 2.10% of the population.

There were 216 households, out of which 25.5% had children under the age of 18 living with them, 37.04% were married couples living together, 12.50% had a female householder with no husband present, and 47.22% were non-families. 38.89% of all households were made up of individuals, and 14.81% had someone living alone who was 65 years of age or older. The average household size was 3.04 and the average family size was 2.31.

The village's age distribution consisted of 21.8% under the age of 18, 2.2% from 18 to 24, 28.8% from 25 to 44, 28.4% from 45 to 64, and 18.6% who were 65 years of age or older. The median age was 41.9 years. For every 100 females, there were 77.6 males. For every 100 females age 18 and over, there were 72.6 males.

The median income for a household in the village was $33,750, and the median income for a family was $47,500. Males had a median income of $34,583 versus $19,688 for females. The per capita income for the village was $16,975. About 7.0% of families and 19.1% of the population were below the poverty line, including 14.3% of those under age 18 and 17.2% of those age 65 or over.

== Education ==
Sorento was home to the now closed Sorento Elementary School which educated students ages pre-K through 8th grade. Sorento Elementary was a 2011 Blue Ribbon school, one of only 19 schools in Illinois and 304 in the entire United States.

== Events ==
An annual homecoming usually lasting for two days is held every summer normally during August.

A major arts and crafts festival known as the Sorento Fall Festival (formerly the Ripson Bridge Festival) is held in downtown Sorento each autumn, usually on the first Sunday in October. The event features live music throughout the day, children's games, an old-fashioned cake walk, and arts and craft vendors.

== Notable people ==
- Esther Snyder, co-founder of In-N-Out Burger
- Fred R. Volkmar, director of Yale Child Study Center
