= Mulberry Grove Community Unit School District 1 =

School district in Illinois, United States

Address
- 801 West Wall Street Mulberry Grove, Illinois, 62262; United States
- Coordinates: 38°55′27.2″N 89°16′39.3″W

District information
- Type: Public
- Grades: PreK–12
- NCES District ID: 1727450

Students and staff
- Students: 353 (2020–2021)

Other information
- Website: www.mgschools.com

Mulberry Grove Community Unit School District 1 is a unified school district located in Mulberry Grove, a small village located in the eastern reaches of Bond County, Illinois. This school district is composed of two schools: Mulberry Grove Elementary School, and Mulberry Grove Junior/Senior High School, The superintendent of Mulberry Grove Community Unit School District 1 is Mr. Brad Turner; the principal of Mulberry Grove Elementary School is Mr. Robert Koontz, and the duties of principal for both Mulberry Grove Junior High School and Mulberry Grove High School are shared between Koontz and Turner. The mascot is the eagle for the elementary school and the Flying Aces for the high school.

Mulberry Grove Community Unit School District 1's high school provides several extracurricular activities, including that of Scholar Bowl, Rocket Club and a chapter of the FFA.
