= Bond County, Illinois =

County in Illinois, United States

- County
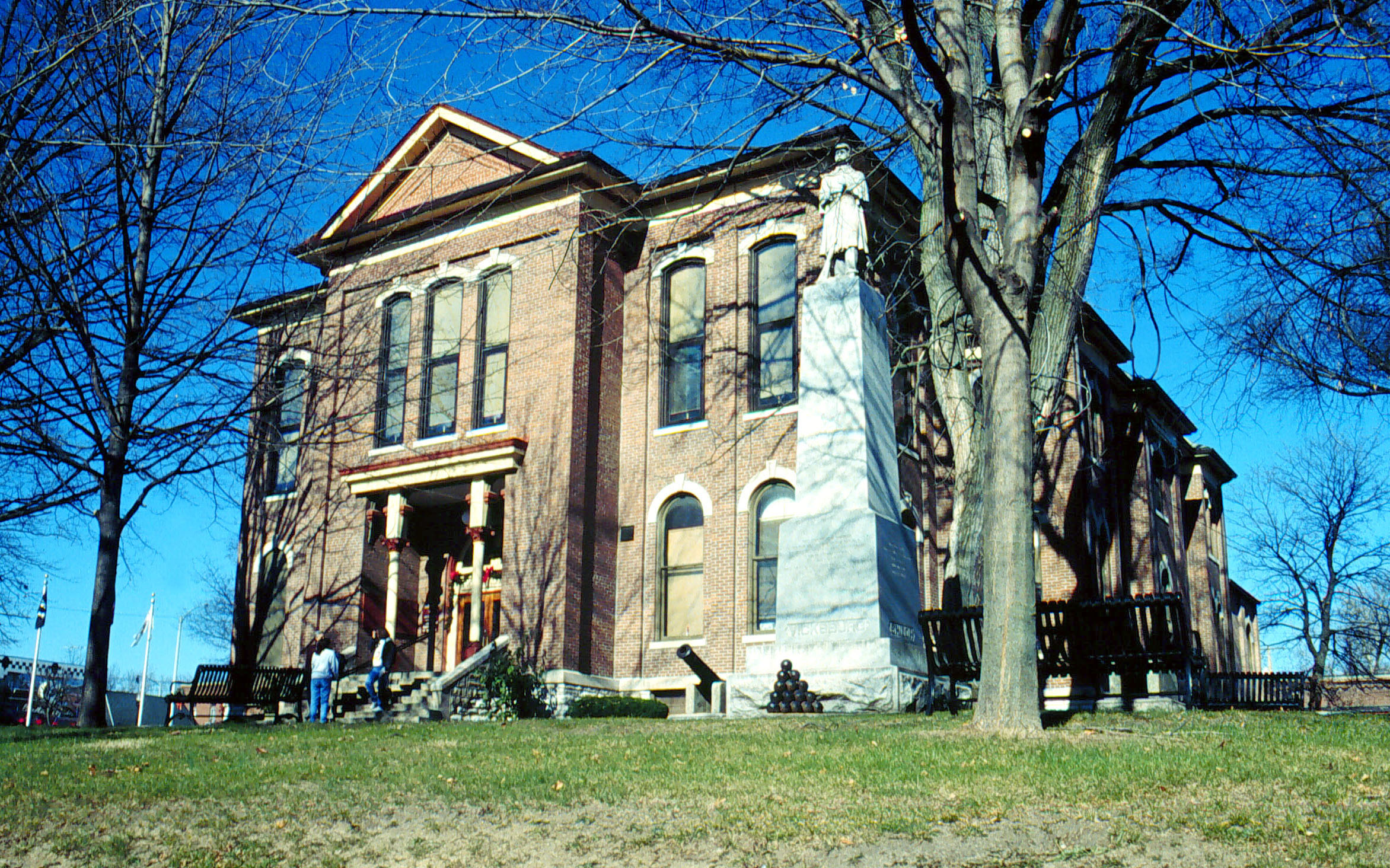
- Bond County Courthouse in Greenville

- Location within the U.S. state of Illinois
- Coordinates: 38°53′N 89°26′W
- Country: United States
- State: Illinois
- Founded: 1817
- Named for: Shadrach Bond
- Seat: Greenville
- Largest city: Greenville

Area
  - Total: 383 sq mi (990 km^{2})
  - Land: 380 sq mi (980 km^{2})
  - Water: 2.5 sq mi (6.5 km^{2}) 0.6%

Population (2020)
  - Total: 16,725
  - Estimate (2025): 16,959 ▲
  - Density: 44/sq mi (17/km^{2})
- Time zone: UTC−6 (Central)
  - Summer (DST): UTC−5 (CDT)
- Congressional district: 15th
- Website: bondcountyil.gov

Bond County is a county located in the U.S. state of Illinois. As of the 2020 census, the population was 16,725. Its county seat is Greenville.

Bond County is included in the St. Louis, MO-IL Metropolitan Statistical Area.

== History ==
Bond County was formed in 1817 out of Madison County. It was named for Shadrach Bond, who was then the delegate from the Illinois Territory to the United States Congress, and who thereupon became the first governor of Illinois, serving from 1818 to 1822.

The county's primary city, Greenville, had a post office from 1819 and was incorporated as a town in 1855 and as a city in 1872. A few possible reasons have been put forth for the naming of the town. Some think the town was named after Greenville, North Carolina, which had been named after Revolutionary War general Nathanael Greene. Others say that Greenville was named by early settler Thomas White because it was "so green and nice." A third possibility is that Greenville was named after Green P. Rice, the town's first merchant.

In 1824, a vote taken on slavery in Bond County had received 240 votes against and 63 votes for slavery. While Illinois was not a slave state, it was adjacent to slave states, Missouri and Kentucky, and did allow the continued use of "indentured servants," a process many slaveowners used to keep their slaves even in a free state.

In Bond County, at one point 14 slaves were registered to eight owners. One slave, Silas Register, took his last name from the act of being registered at the county clerk's office. Register was the last known Bond County slave to survive; he died in 1872 at the age of 76. A few of the slaves are buried in the county with the families they were indentured to. One former slave, Fanny, was free after her owners moved out of the state and worked in the town so that she could buy her husband, Stephen, at auction in Missouri.

During the 1840s, Bond County played host to a few people conducting slaves to freedom on the Underground Railroad. Teacher T.A. Jones lived in Reno and in 2008, a letter in which he told of his Underground Railroad activities was discovered in a staircase in Sparta. Slaves were often spirited from Missouri, sometimes through Carlyle to Bond County. Rev. John Leeper was able to disguise his Underground Railroad activities due to his milling business. Dr. Henry Perrine practiced medicine near Greenville and helped with the secret railroad activities. Rev. George Denny's house was found in the 1930s to conceal a secret chamber that had been used in the Railroad.

Greenville University was founded as Almira College in 1855. In 1941, college president H.J. Long "declared the founding of Almira and Greenville ran parallel, for both were founded on prayer."

When Abraham Lincoln and Stephen Douglas gave speeches in Greenville in 1858 during a campaign for the United States Senate, Douglas said: "Ladies and gentlemen it gives me great and supreme gratification and pleasure to see this vast concourse of people assembled to hear me upon this my first visit to Old Bond." The Illinois State Register reported of the occasion: "I've seen many gatherings in Old Bond county but I never saw anything equal to this and I never expect to."

Women in Bond County could vote for the first time in 1914. On November 21, 1915, the Liberty Bell passed through Greenville on its nationwide tour returning to Pennsylvania from the Panama-Pacific International Exposition in San Francisco. After that trip, the Liberty Bell returned to Pennsylvania and will not be moved again.

The Greenville Public Library was established as a Carnegie library and is on the National Register of Historic Places. Hogue Hall at Greenville College, demolished in 2008, also formerly appeared on the National Register.

On April 18, 1934, during the Great Depression, a group of 500 protesters marched to the Illinois Emergency Relief Commission to lodge complaints about the delivery of emergency supplies from the state and federal governments.

Ronald Reagan visited Greenville on the campaign trail in the 1980s and gave a speech on the courthouse lawn. Barack Obama, the junior Senator from Illinois elected as president in November 2008, also visited Greenville while campaigning for his Senate seat in 2004, in a visit hosted by the Bond County Democrats.

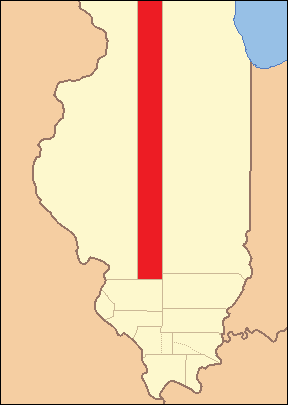
Bond County at the time of its creation in 1817, extending north to Lake Superior.

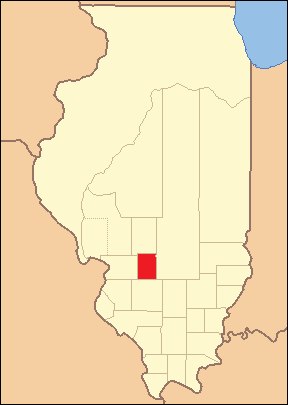
Bond County between 1821 and 1824

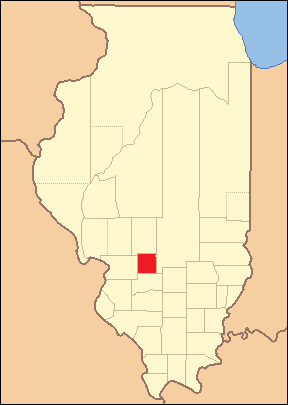
Bond between 1824 and 1843

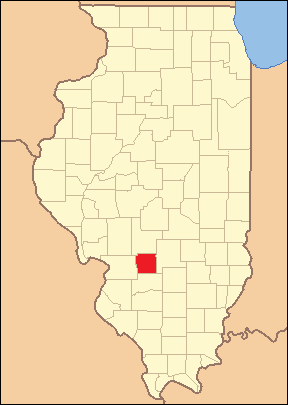
Bond county was enlarged slightly to its current size in 1843.

== Geography ==
According to the U.S. Census Bureau, the county has a total area of 383 square miles (990 km^{2}), of which 380 square miles (980 km^{2}) is land and 2.5 square miles (6.5 km^{2}) (0.6%) is water.

=== Adjacent counties ===
- Montgomery County – north
- Fayette County – east
- Clinton County – south
- Madison County – west

=== Major highways ===
- Interstate 70
- U.S. Route 40
- Illinois Route 127
- Illinois Route 140
- Illinois Route 143

== Climate and weather ==
Greenville, Illinois

Climate chart (precipitation, max. and min. temperature)
J	F	M	A	M	J	J	A	S	O	N	D
2.2 37 21	2 44 26	3.6 56 35	4.2 68 45	4.3 78 55	4.1 87 64	3.5 91 68	3.5 89 66	3.2 82 58	2.9 71 47	3.8 55 37	3 42 26
- █ Average max. and min. temperatures in °F
- █ Precipitation totals in inches
- Source: The Weather Channel
Metric conversion
J	F	M	A	M	J	J	A	S	O	N	D
55 3 −6	51 7 −3	90 13 2	106 20 7	109 26 13	103 31 18	88 33 20	90 32 19	80 28 14	74 22 8	97 13 3	76 6 −3
- █ Average max. and min. temperatures in °C
- █ Precipitation totals in mm

In recent years, average temperatures in the county seat of Greenville have ranged from a low of 21 °F (−6 °C) in January to a high of 91 °F (33 °C) in July, although a record low of −22 °F (−30 °C) was recorded in February 1905 and a record high of 114 °F (46 °C) was recorded in July 1954. Average monthly precipitation ranged from 2.00 inches (51 mm) in February to 4.31 inches (109 mm) in May.

== Demographics ==
2000 census age pyramid for Bond County.

Historical population
Census	Pop.	Note	%±
1820	2,931		—
1830	3,124		6.6%
1840	5,060		62.0%
1850	6,144		21.4%
1860	9,815		59.7%
1870	13,152		34.0%
1880	14,866		13.0%
1890	14,550		−2.1%
1900	16,078		10.5%
1910	17,075		6.2%
1920	16,045		−6.0%
1930	14,406		−10.2%
1940	14,540		0.9%
1950	14,157		−2.6%
1960	14,060		−0.7%
1970	14,012		−0.3%
1980	16,224		15.8%
1990	14,991		−7.6%
2000	17,633		17.6%
2010	17,768		0.8%
2020	16,725		−5.9%
2025 (est.)	16,959	▲	1.4%
U.S. Decennial Census; 1790-1960 1900-1990; 1990-2000 2010-2013

=== 2020 census ===
As of the 2020 census, the county had a population of 16,725 and a population density of 43.7 inhabitants per square mile (16.9/km^{2}). There were 6,858 housing units at an average density of 17.9 per square mile (6.9/km^{2}).

The median age was 41.7 years. 18.2% of residents were under the age of 18 and 18.9% of residents were 65 years of age or older. For every 100 females there were 118.5 males, and for every 100 females age 18 and over there were 121.9 males age 18 and over.

The racial makeup of the county was 86.4% White, 6.4% Black or African American, 0.3% American Indian and Alaska Native, 0.6% Asian, 0.1% Native Hawaiian and Pacific Islander, 2.2% from some other race, and 4.0% from two or more races. Hispanic or Latino residents of any race comprised 3.6% of the population.

40.4% of residents lived in urban areas, while 59.6% lived in rural areas.

There were 6,164 households in the county, of which 26.5% had children under the age of 18 living in them. Of all households, 49.9% were married-couple households, 18.7% were households with a male householder and no spouse or partner present, and 24.6% were households with a female householder and no spouse or partner present. About 29.7% of all households were made up of individuals and 14.7% had someone living alone who was 65 years of age or older.

Of the 6,858 housing units, 10.1% were vacant. Among occupied housing units, 76.7% were owner-occupied and 23.3% were renter-occupied. The homeowner vacancy rate was 1.9% and the rental vacancy rate was 8.4%.

=== 2010 census ===
As of the 2010 census, there were 17,768 people, 6,359 households, and 4,033 families residing in the county. The most commonly reported ancestries were German (28.9%), Irish (13.4%), English (9.3%), and American (9.2%).

Of the 6,359 households, 25.6% had children under the age of 18 living with them, 53.8% were married couples living together, 7.4% had a female householder with no husband present, 36.6% were non-families. 29.9% of all households were made up of individuals, and 15.9% had someone living alone who was 65 years of age or older. The average household size was 2.32 and the average family size was 2.87.

19.1% of the population was under 18 years of age, 9.2% was between 18 and 24, 37.7% was between 15 and 44, and 18.8% was over 65. The median age was 42.5 years. For every 100 females there were 111.0 males.

The median income for a household in the county was $53,568 and the median income for a family was $69,917. Males had a median income of $41,231 versus $26,408 for females. The per capita income for the county was $27,274. About 6.6% of families and 13.6% of the population were below the poverty line, including 17.0% of those under age 18 and 7.8% of those age 65 or over.

In terms of education, 33.2% of the population had attained a high school or equivalent degree, 13.2% had a bachelor's degree, and 8.5% had a graduate or professional degree.

=== Racial and ethnic composition ===
Bond County, Illinois – Racial and ethnic composition Note: the US Census treats Hispanic/Latino as an ethnic category. This table excludes Latinos from the racial categories and assigns them to a separate category. Hispanics/Latinos may be of any race.
Race / Ethnicity (NH = Non-Hispanic)	Pop 1980	Pop 1990	Pop 2000	Pop 2010	Pop 2020	% 1980	% 1990	% 2000	% 2010	% 2020
White alone (NH)	15,705	14,432	15,841	15,797	14,264	96.80%	96.27%	89.84%	88.91%	85.29%
Black or African American alone (NH)	398	419	1,297	1,061	1,073	2.45%	2.80%	7.36%	5.97%	6.42%
Native American or Alaska Native alone (NH)	21	34	73	76	52	0.13%	0.23%	0.41%	0.43%	0.31%
Asian alone (NH)	35	14	44	67	94	0.22%	0.09%	0.25%	0.38%	0.56%
Native Hawaiian or Pacific Islander alone (NH)	x	x	8	3	11	x	x	0.05%	0.02%	0.07%
Other race alone (NH)	6	12	11	7	93	0.04%	0.08%	0.06%	0.04%	0.56%
Mixed race or Multiracial (NH)	x	x	106	210	534	x	x	0.60%	1.18%	3.19%
Hispanic or Latino (any race)	59	80	253	547	604	0.36%	0.53%	1.43%	3.08%	3.61%
Total	16,224	14,991	17,633	17,768	16,725	100.00%	100.00%	100.00%	100.00%	100.00%

== Education ==
- Bond County Community Unit School District 2
- Carlyle Community Unit School District 1
- Highland Community Unit School District 5
- Hillsboro Community Unit School District 3
- Mulberry Grove Community Unit School District 1
- Vandalia Community Unit School District 203
- Greenville University

== Communities ==
Community	Community type	Population	Total Area	Water Area	Land Area	Pop. Density
Donnellson	village	153	0.37	0.00	0.37	413.51
Greenville	city	7,083	6.31	0.00	6.31	1,122.68
Keyesport	village	406	0.74	0.02	0.72	563.89
Mulberry Grove	village	520	1.02	0.01	1.02	511.81
Old Ripley	village	82	0.15	0.00	0.15	532.47
Panama	village	337	0.37	0.00	0.36	923.29
Pierron	village	459	0.73	0.00	0.73	630
Pocahontas	village	697	0.80	0.02	0.78	890.17
Smithboro	village	154	0.93	0.00	0.93	165.24
Sorento	village	429	0.80	0.00	0.80	537.59
Bond County	county	16,725	383	2.5	380	44

=== Townships ===
Bond County is divided into these nine townships:

- Burgess
- Central
- Lagrange
- Mills
- Mulberry Grove
- Old Ripley
- Pleasant Mound
- Shoal Creek
- Tamalco

=== Unincorporated communities ===
- Beaver Creek
- Dudleyville
- Durley
- Hookdale
- Pleasant Mound
- Reno
- Stubblefield
- Tamalco
- Woburn

== Politics ==
Bond is a strongly Republican county. Only two Democrats have gained an absolute majority of the county's vote since at least 1880 – Franklin D. Roosevelt in 1932 and Lyndon Johnson in 1964. Bill Clinton was the last Democrat to win the county, in 1996, with then-sitting US Senator Barack Obama came within 100-plus votes in 2008.

United States presidential election results for Bond County, Illinois
Year	Republican		Democratic		Third party(ies)	
Year	No.	%	No.	%	No.	%
1892	1,659	50.26%	1,328	40.23%	314	9.51%
1896	1,967	52.96%	1,664	44.80%	83	2.23%
1900	2,101	53.90%	1,629	41.79%	168	4.31%
1904	2,055	55.86%	1,210	32.89%	414	11.25%
1908	2,143	53.68%	1,465	36.70%	384	9.62%
1912	1,152	33.56%	1,278	37.23%	1,003	29.22%
1916	3,626	54.01%	2,652	39.50%	436	6.49%
1920	3,662	64.67%	1,533	27.07%	468	8.26%
1924	3,644	56.88%	2,143	33.45%	620	9.68%
1928	4,160	64.06%	2,298	35.39%	36	0.55%
1932	3,171	45.57%	3,630	52.17%	157	2.26%
1936	4,046	51.63%	3,541	45.19%	249	3.18%
1940	4,754	57.38%	3,376	40.75%	155	1.87%
1944	3,907	58.24%	2,607	38.86%	194	2.89%
1948	3,438	53.03%	2,837	43.76%	208	3.21%
1952	4,565	62.03%	2,776	37.72%	18	0.24%
1956	4,342	60.41%	2,834	39.43%	11	0.15%
1960	4,297	60.00%	2,856	39.88%	9	0.13%
1964	3,058	44.49%	3,815	55.51%	0	0.00%
1968	3,674	52.84%	2,516	36.19%	763	10.97%
1972	4,475	62.30%	2,704	37.64%	4	0.06%
1976	3,716	49.69%	3,682	49.24%	80	1.07%
1980	4,398	58.39%	2,834	37.63%	300	3.98%
1984	4,240	59.46%	2,870	40.25%	21	0.29%
1988	3,608	50.78%	3,459	48.68%	38	0.53%
1992	2,715	35.97%	3,428	45.42%	1,405	18.61%
1996	3,018	43.30%	3,213	46.10%	739	10.60%
2000	3,804	54.10%	3,060	43.52%	168	2.39%
2004	4,068	55.20%	3,228	43.81%	73	0.99%
2008	3,947	49.59%	3,843	48.28%	170	2.14%
2012	4,095	55.53%	3,020	40.95%	260	3.53%
2016	4,888	64.57%	2,068	27.32%	614	8.11%
2020	5,625	68.89%	2,288	28.02%	252	3.09%
2024	5,692	71.01%	2,117	26.41%	207	2.58%

== See also ==
- National Register of Historic Places listings in Bond County, Illinois
