= Bond County Community Unit School District 2 =

School district in Bond County, Illinois, United States

Address
- 1008 North Hena Street Greenville, Illinois, 62246; United States

District information
- Type: Public
- Grades: PreK–12
- NCES District ID: 1717730

Students and staff
- Students: 1,658 (2020–2021)

Other information
- Website: www.bccu2.org

Bond County Community Unit School District 2 is a unified school district based in Greenville, a city located in central Bond County, Illinois that serves as its county seat. Today, the district is composed of five schools; Greenville Elementary School, a NASA Explorer school that serves grades Pre-K through 5; Pocahontas Elementary School, which serves grades Pre-K through 8; Greenville Junior High School, a school that means to bridge Greenville Elementary and Greenville High by serving grades 6-8; and lastly, Greenville High School, of which all the schools ultimately feed into, serving grades 9-12. The superintendent of the school district is Wes Olson; the principal of Greenville Elementary is Eric Swingler, the principal of Pocahontas Elementary is Andrew Beckham, the principal of Greenville Junior High is Gary Brauns, and the principal of Greenville High is Kara Harris. Respectively, the mascot Greenville Elementary is the rocket; of Pocahontas, it is the Indian. The mascot of Greenville Junior High is the blue jay, and the mascot of Greenville High is the Comet.

Bond County Community Unit School District 2 provides information to prevent bullying and harassment via its main page. It also runs several extracurricular programs, such as chorus and a track and field athletic team.
