= Greenville, Illinois =

- City
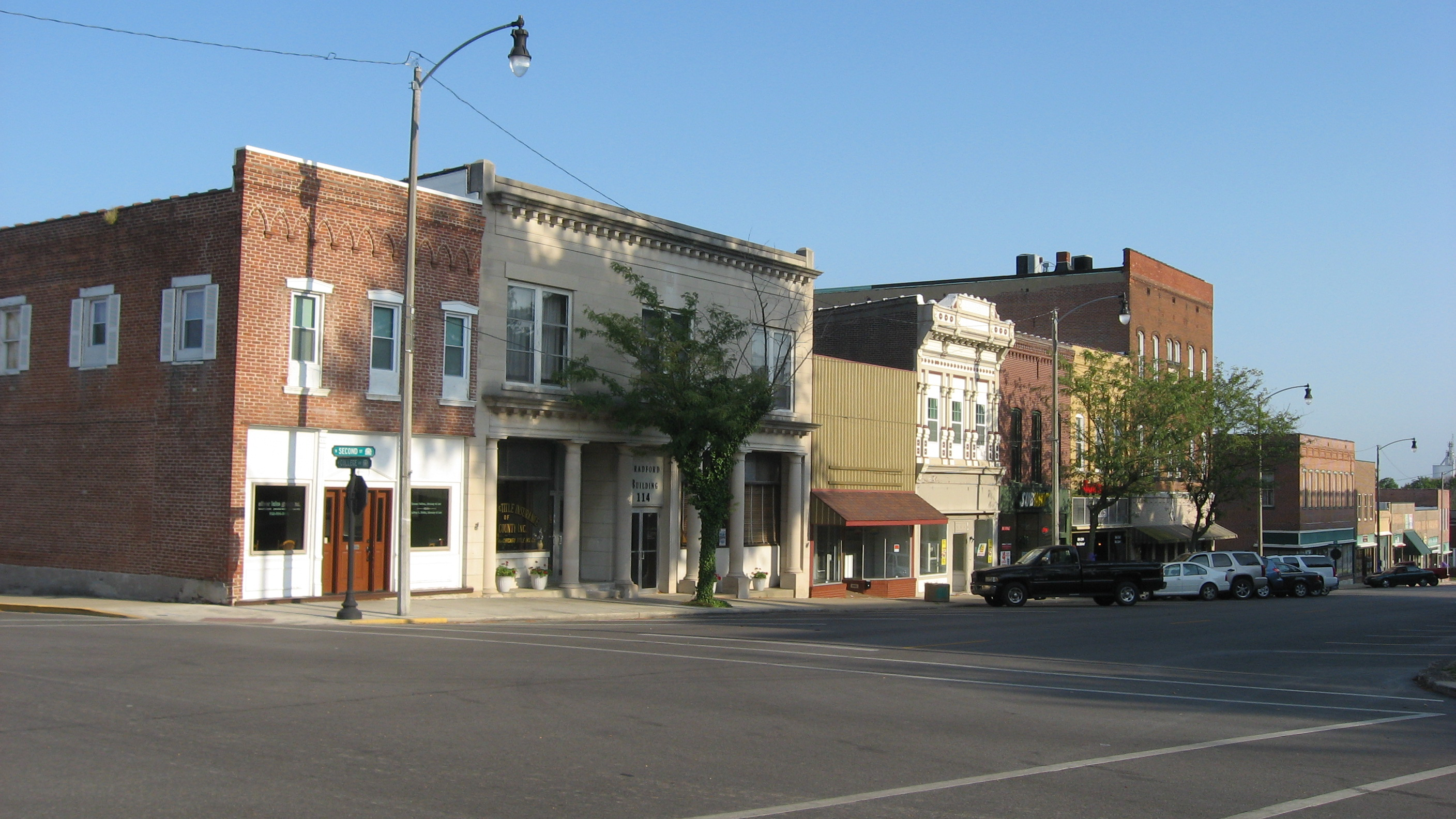
- Second Street in Downtown Greenville

- Logo
- Motto: "Arms Wide Open"
- Interactive map of Greenville, Illinois
- Location within Illinois Location within the United States
- Coordinates: 38°53′12″N 89°23′22″W
- Country: United States
- State: Illinois
- County: Bond
- Townships: Central, Pleasant Mound
- Founded: 1815
- Incorporated (town): 1855
- Incorporated (city): 1872
- Founder: George Davidson

Government
  - Type: Mayor-council
  - Mayor: George Barber

Area
  - Total: 6.31 sq mi (16.34 km^{2})
  - Land: 6.31 sq mi (16.34 km^{2})
  - Water: 0 sq mi (0.00 km^{2}) 0%
- Elevation: 577 ft (176 m)

Population (2020)
  - Total: 7,083
  - Estimate (2024): 7,126 ▲
  - Density: 1,122.7/sq mi (433.49/km^{2})
- Demonym: Greenvillian
- Time zone: UTC-6 (CST)
  - Summer (DST): UTC-5 (CDT)
- ZIP Code(s): 62246
- Area codes: 618
- FIPS code: 17-31589
- GNIS feature ID: 2394995
- Wikimedia Commons: Greenville, Illinois
- Website: www.greenvilleillinois.com

Greenville is a city in Bond County, Illinois, United States, 51 miles (82 km) east of St. Louis. The population as of the 2020 census was 7,083, up from 7,000 at the 2010 census. It is the county seat of Bond County.

Greenville is part of the St. Louis Metropolitan Statistical Area. It is also considered part of the Metro East region of Illinois.

Greenville celebrated its Bicentennial in 2015 as one of the oldest communities in Illinois. It is home to Greenville University, the Richard Bock Museum, the American Farm Heritage Museum, the Armed Forces Museum and the Demoulin Museum and a federal prison, Federal Correctional Institution, Greenville (FCI Greenville). It is also home to internationally known companies, including Nevco Scoreboard, the largest privately owned scoreboard company in the world, and DeMoulin Brothers, the world's oldest and largest manufacturer of band uniforms.

== History ==
Greenville was founded by George Davidson in 1815 in what was then the Illinois Territory, when he purchased 160 acres (65 ha) along the bluff overlooking Little Shoal Creek, in what was then still part of Madison County. Davidson built a tavern near the present-day intersection of Main and Sixth streets, and by 1816 he was selling individual lots. The federal government established its first federal post office in Greenville in 1819. It was incorporated as a town in 1855 and as a city in 1872. At one time, it had neighborhoods called New Jerusalem, Piety Hill, Cobtown, and Buzzard Roost. A few possible reasons have been put forth for the naming of the town. Some think the town was named after Greenville, North Carolina, which had been named after Revolutionary War general Nathanael Greene. Others say that Greenville was named by early settler Thomas White because it was "so green and nice". A third possibility is that Greenville was named after Green P. Rice, the town's first merchant.

Greenville became the county seat of Bond County in 1821. The earlier seat of Perryville was annexed into Fayette County when it was formed from part of Bond County, requiring the naming of a new seat. Davidson offered to give the county government land around the present-day town square. His offer was accepted, and a courthouse was built in 1821 on the site of the current courthouse.

During the 1840s, some Bond County residents conducted slaves to freedom on the Underground Railroad. Slaves were often spirited from Missouri, sometimes through Carlyle to Bond County. Rev. John Leeper was able to disguise his Underground Railroad activities due to his milling business. Dr. Henry Perrine practiced medicine near Greenville and helped with the secret railroad activities. Rev. George Denny's house was found in the 1930s to conceal a secret chamber that had been used in the Railroad.

Greenville University was founded as Almira College, a women's college, in 1855. Former GU history professor Donald Jordahl has written that Almira College was "one of the earliest extensions westward of an eastern idea favorable toward female education, an early step in the women's suffrage and liberation movement." In 1941, college president H.J. Long "declared the founding of Almira and Greenville ran parallel, for both were founded on prayer." Women in Bond County could vote for the first time in 1914.

When Abraham Lincoln and Stephen Douglas gave speeches in Greenville in 1858 during a campaign for the United States Senate, Douglas said: "Ladies and gentlemen, it gives me great and supreme gratification and pleasure to see this vast concourse of people assembled to hear me upon this my first visit to Old Bond." The Illinois State Register reported of the occasion: "I've seen many gatherings in Old Bond county but I never saw anything equal to this and I never expect to."

On November 21, 1915, the Liberty Bell passed through Greenville on its nationwide tour returning to Pennsylvania from the Panama–Pacific International Exposition in San Francisco. After that trip, the Liberty Bell returned to Pennsylvania and will not be moved again.

The Greenville Public Library was established as a Carnegie library and is on the National Register of Historic Places. Hogue Hall at Greenville College also appeared on the National Register (it was demolished in 2008).

On April 18, 1934, during the Great Depression, a group of 500 protesters marched to the Illinois Emergency Relief Commission to lodge complaints about the delivery of emergency supplies from the state and federal governments.

Illinois native Ronald Reagan visited Greenville on the campaign trail in 1980 and gave a speech on the street in front of the courthouse; his visit is commemorated by a plaque. Barack Obama visited Greenville while campaigning for his Senate seat in 2004, in a visit hosted by the Bond County Democrats.

=== Historic businesses ===
While Greenville once hosted three newspapers, The Item, The Sun, and The Advocate, it now has only the twice-weekly Greenville Advocate. The Advocate is the oldest business in Bond County and one of the oldest newspapers in Illinois. Original Advocate owner Jediah Alexander was friends with Abraham Lincoln and instrumental in bringing Lincoln to Greenville for a visit.

Historic Greenville businesses also include the Helvetia Milk Condensing Company, which later became the Pet Milk Company. The condensing plant, built in 1899, was the oldest in the world for many years until it was torn down in the early 1990s. Pet also maintained its research and testing center in Greenville. Many products. including Instant Pet, Pet-Ritz pies, Sego diet foods, and Old El Paso products were developed there, along with the first use of food irradiation to increase the Vitamin D content of milk. The remaining research buildings and warehouses were sold to Mallinckrodt Pharmaceuticals in the 1990s, which continues to operate there today.

Other historic businesses in Greenville included shoe manufacturer Mayer and Bannister, cigar manufacturers Thomas D. Scheske and H.H. Wirz, and a glove factory, the Greenville Glove Manufacturing Co. In the early 1900s, Greenville had its own power company, Greenville Electric Gas and Power Company, which later was bought by Illinois Power and Light Service.

The Watson family operated a pharmacy in Greenville for over 125 years, since 1881; it was sold in 2006, but still maintains the name Watson's Drug Store. Greenville once had a silent movie theatre, the Lyric, and now has a first-run movie theatre, the Globe.

Bradford National Bank was founded in 1867 by James Bradford and his son Samuel and was originally known as the Banking House of Bradford and Sons. In 1910, the bank received its national charter to become Bradford National Bank. In 2017, the bank celebrated its 150th anniversary and is the 10th oldest bank in Illinois.

Today, the bank has locations in Greenville, Highland, and Marine, Illinois.

== Geography ==
Greenville is located near the center of Bond County. U.S. Route 40 and Interstate 70 pass to the south of downtown, both highways leading west 49 miles (79 km) to St. Louis and east 19 miles (31 km) to Vandalia.

Greenville is also located on Illinois Route 127, which is a major north–south route connecting Southern Illinois to Springfield.

The National Road passes through Greenville. East of Greenville it follows Illinois Route 140, and west it follows U.S. Route 40. Its route west of town was the source of a historic controversy. Original plans were to connect Greenville to St. Louis. However, the Illinois General Assembly preferred a route to Alton to favor an Illinois city directly on the Mississippi River. When federal money for the road ran out in 1840 at Vandalia, 19 miles east of Greenville, the State Legislature refused to fund it further. Residents of Greenville, Highland, Troy, and Collinsville paid to complete the road to East St. Louis. The "State Policy" of favoring Alton over St. Louis remained a major political issue in Illinois until the Civil War.

According to the 2021 census gazetteer files, Greenville has a total area of 6.31 square miles (16.34 km^{2}), all land.

== Demographics ==
Historical population
Census	Pop.	Note	%±
1880	1,886		—
1890	1,868		−1.0%
1900	2,504		34.0%
1910	3,178		26.9%
1920	3,091		−2.7%
1930	3,233		4.6%
1940	3,391		4.9%
1950	4,069		20.0%
1960	4,569		12.3%
1970	4,631		1.4%
1980	5,271		13.8%
1990	4,806		−8.8%
2000	6,955		44.7%
2010	7,000		0.6%
2020	7,083		1.2%
U.S. Decennial Census

=== 2020 census ===
As of the 2020 census, Greenville had a population of 7,083 and a population density of 1,122.68 inhabitants per square mile (433.47/km^{2}). The median age was 36.0 years. 15.5% of residents were under the age of 18 and 14.8% of residents were 65 years of age or older. For every 100 females there were 142.5 males, and for every 100 females age 18 and over there were 148.8 males age 18 and over.

95.2% of residents lived in urban areas, while 4.8% lived in rural areas.

There were 2,124 households and 1,222 families in Greenville. 25.8% of households had children under the age of 18 living in them. Of all households, 37.8% were married-couple households, 18.8% were households with a male householder and no spouse or partner present, and 36.2% were households with a female householder and no spouse or partner present. About 38.8% of all households were made up of individuals and 18.7% had someone living alone who was 65 years of age or older. There were 2,403 housing units at an average density of 380.88 per square mile (147.06/km^{2}), of which 11.6% were vacant. The homeowner vacancy rate was 4.5% and the rental vacancy rate was 9.9%.

Racial composition as of the 2020 census
Race	Number	Percent
White	5,337	75.3%
Black or African American	980	13.8%
American Indian and Alaska Native	33	0.5%
Asian	87	1.2%
Native Hawaiian and Other Pacific Islander	11	0.2%
Some other race	327	4.6%
Two or more races	308	4.3%
Hispanic or Latino (of any race)	463	6.5%

=== Income and poverty ===
The median income for a household in the city was $40,625, and the median income for a family was $59,271. Males had a median income of $29,233 versus $25,985 for females. The per capita income for the city was $20,551. About 10.0% of families and 20.9% of the population were below the poverty line, including 28.5% of those under age 18 and 6.0% of those age 65 or over.

== Government ==
The first mayor of Greenville, James Bradford, was elected in 1873. He was the owner of Bradford and Son bank, which is still in existence today as Bradford National Bank. Bradford later went on to serve in the Illinois Legislature.

During the first half of the 20th century, the Anti-Saloon Party was a player in local politics, with aldermen and mayors being elected from the ticket in 1911, 1913, 1917, and 1953. After the 1953 election, a "city manager" style of government was voted in, which provided for non-partisan city council members.

Greenville has had a mayor and city council form of government since 1957. Fire services are provided by the Greenville Fire Protection District.

== Education ==
In 1992, private Free Methodist college Greenville University celebrated its 100th anniversary and was featured on NBC's Today Show. In 2006, the college was again featured prominently in a Today Show story about the rapid growth of Christian colleges and universities. In 2007, GC had a record enrollment of an estimated 1,100 traditional students. The college was the first campus in America to go completely wireless with its Internet.

Enrollment topped 1,000 students for the first time in the college's history in 2006. The current student body at Greenville College contains over 1,500 students; most are from various Christian denominations. The college currently offers undergraduate degrees in over 50 different programs of study and graduate degrees in education.

Greenville also hosts a satellite center for Kaskaskia College, a community college headquartered in Centralia, Illinois.

In addition to its colleges, Greenville is home to Bond County Community Unit #2 High School (usually known as Greenville High School), home of the Comets. Since 2007, the Comets football team has appeared in the Final Four in the IHSA Class 3A state football playoffs five out of seven years: in 2007, 2009, 2011, 2012 and 2013. In 2007 they lost to Columbia, in 2011 they lost to Mount Carmel, and in both 2009 and 2012 they lost to Tolono Unity. The Comets' 2010 playoff run set many state records.

Students from the neighboring towns of Pocahontas and Sorento are part of Bond County Community Unit School District 2 with Greenville students and attend high school in Greenville. One of these notable students was country singer Gretchen Wilson, who attended GHS but did not graduate.

Greenville Junior High, home of the Bluejays, and Greenville Elementary School, home of the Rockets, round out Greenville's local schools. Although it is referred to as a junior high, Greenville Junior High is now a middle school, with sixth through eighth grades. During the 2006 school year, Greenville Elementary was one of only 25 schools selected nationwide as a NASA Explorer school, a three-year partnership with NASA to promote math, science, and space exploration.

== Media ==
In addition to the long-running Greenville newspaper The Advocate. Greenville's radio station WGEL covers local and county news. The station is a country music station with the tagline "The Best Country in the Country". WGRN 89.5 is a radio station also in Greenville, run by Greenville University, and also WPMB 102.7 Greenville, and 104.7 Vandalia.

== Culture ==
For 37 years, Greenville had been the site of the annual multi-day Agape Music Festival, or AgapeFest, a Christian music festival put on by Greenville College students — the only Christian music festival in the country run by students. The festival has hosted many of the most famous Christian bands, along with more mainstream acts like Owl City in 2013. The college announced its intention to move the festival to the Family Arena in St. Charles, Missouri for a one-day event in 2014 for the stated reason of appealing to new audiences, but the relocated event was instead canceled due to low ticket sales the week before it was held. The Agape organizers announced that their intention for future years is to return the festival to its traditional home at the Bond County Fairgrounds.

In the past, Greenville has served as the annual host to the World Powered Parachute Championships as the "Chute-Out on the Prairie" at Greenville Airport. The first championship ever held was held in Greenville, which is home to some notable participants of the sport.

Greenville conducts the Bond County Fair every August. In 2008, the Vietnam Veterans' Memorial Traveling Wall visited Greenville to coincide with the fair activities.

The Greenville Graffiti Car Show has been held downtown for the past three years and features a large car show with appearances by nostalgic celebrities downtown. In 2013, Donna Douglas, who played Elly Mae Clampett on The Beverly Hillbillies, was the celebrity, and in 2014 Greenville hosted actor James Best, who played Sheriff Roscoe P. Coltrane on The Dukes of Hazzard.

== Recreation ==
Because of its central location in the country, and its position directly on Interstate 70, Greenville sees many visitors undertaking cross-country walks and bike rides. It serves as a time station for the Race Across America cross-country bike ride.

Greenville Municipal Airport is located 3 mi south of downtown at 38° 50′ 10″ N, 89° 22′ 42″ W. It has one of the closest skydiving centers to St. Louis, the Gateway Skydiving Center.

Governor Bond Lake, a 775-acre man-made lake named after the first governor of Illinois, Shadrach Bond, is near Greenville. It was built in the late 1960s to supply water to the city and is now also used for fishing, boating, camping, and other recreational purposes. Greenville is 17 miles from the largest man-made lake in Illinois, Carlyle Lake, which is one of the most popular recreational areas in southern Illinois.

== Places of interest ==
Greenville has an old-fashioned downtown, with murals and antique shops. The city has been conducting a restoration project on the downtown murals.

Lincoln – Douglas Campaign and the American Civil War

A large stone and plaque placed by the Daughters of the American Revolution mark the location where Abraham Lincoln and Stephen Douglas gave speeches while running for the United States Senate in 1858. The city unsuccessfully applied for a grant from the Illinois Abraham Lincoln Bicentennial Commission to buy the property on South Fifth Street where Lincoln spoke and to create a small Lincoln Park. A statue dedicated to county veterans of the Civil War was dedicated on the courthouse lawn in 1903; the courthouse lawn has a Veterans' Memorial in honor of all county veterans.

Sears Catalog Homes

Many Sears Catalog Homes — houses made from kits bought from the Sears and Roebuck catalog — are dotted around the town.

Greenville University

Greenville University is home to the only museum dedicated to the sculptures of Richard Bock, who was an associate of Frank Lloyd Wright and designed many of the sculptures for Wright-designed homes.

American Farm Heritage Museum and Hills Fort

Greenville hosts the American Farm Heritage Museum and Hills Fort, a museum that aims to preserve agricultural history. The museum features exhibits of tractors and other farm-related memorabilia and holds multiple festivals a year. It held its third annual Heritage Days and was the largest Oliver Corp. equipment show in America in 2007, as the national Oliver show was held outside the US. In 2006, 500 tractors were on display for the event, and 5,000 people were in attendance. In 2008, the show was the site of the Cockshutt international equipment show. The AFHM also has a 15-inch-gage train going around it with approximately one mile of track.

In 2011, the St. Louis Armed Forces Museum, which had long been located in Alton, Illinois, relocated to the American Farm Heritage Museum, due to the Greenville museum's tourist traffic and visible location on Interstate 70.

The DeMoulin Museum

One of the most unique museums in the country, the DeMoulin Museum calls Greenville home. Founded in 1892 as a manufacturer of lodge paraphernalia and regalia, DeMoulin Bros. & Co., which was headquartered in Greenville, became one of the nation's leading makers of marching band uniforms. The company's diverse production history has included graduation caps and gowns, choir robes, church and lodge furniture, and lodge initiation devices. The DeMoulin Museum, founded in 2010, pays tribute to the founders, employees, and amazing products created by this unique factory. Though the museum contains examples of many of DeMoulin's creations, the lodge initiation devices–including the Bucking Goat; Invisible Paddle Machine; and Lifting and Spraying Machine–are what have attracted visitors from over 30 states. The museum has been featured in numerous publications, including Atlas Obscura and Roadside America.

== Transportation ==
Greenville Municipal Airport is located 3 miles from the central business district of Greenville.

Greenville rail freight shippers are served by the main lines of BNSF and CSX and the local shortline Illinois Western Railroad that has connections to both BNSF and CSX.

Highways include Interstate 70, U.S. Route 40, Illinois Route 127, and Illinois Route 140.

Bond County Transit has several bus stops in Greenville.

== Notable people ==
- Ernest L. Boyer, former U.S. Commissioner of Education
- Robert Briner, Emmy Award-winning television producer
- Job Adams Cooper, sixth governor of Colorado
- Gerald Greider, Wisconsin legislator
- Phyllis Holmes, former basketball coach for Greenville College and U.S. Olympic Team; member of Women's Basketball Hall of Fame
- Enoch A. Holtwick, temperance activist and Prohibition Party candidate for president in 1956
- Alfred Harrison Joy, astronomer
- Edwin G. Krebs, a Nobel Prize-winning biochemist
- Herbert Lyle Mayfield, hybrid folk instrument designer and builder, inventor of guitalin; writer, columnist, and journeyman printer
- Tom Merritt, former executive editor on TWIT network and host of the Daily Tech News Show.
- Henry Perrine, noted horticulturalist
- Robert E. "Ish" Smith, president of IBAF and the United States Baseball Federation, former president of Greenville College
- Ron Stephens, formerly of the Illinois House of Representatives
- Manuel Velazquez, anti-boxing activist
- Frank Watson, longtime Republican Minority Leader of the Illinois Senate
- Howard Zahniser, environmental activist, wrote Wilderness Act of 1964
