= List of high schools in Greater St. Louis =

This is a list of high schools in Greater St. Louis. It includes public and private schools and is arranged by state, county and then by school district for public schools, or by affiliation for private schools.

== Illinois public schools ==
=== Bond County ===
- Greenville High School, Greenville
- Mulberry Grove High School, Mulberry Grove

=== Calhoun County ===
- Brussels High School, Brussels
- Calhoun High School, Hardin

=== Clinton County ===
- Carlyle High School, Carlyle
- Central Community High School, Breese
- Christ Our Rock Lutheran High School, Centralia
- Wesclin Senior High School, Trenton

=== Jersey County ===
- Jersey Community High School, Jerseyville

=== Macoupin County ===
- Bunker Hill High School, Bunker Hill
- Carlinville High School, Carlinville
- Gillespie High School, Gillespie
- Mount Olive High School, Mount Olive
- North Mac High School, Virden
- Southwestern High School, Piasa
- Staunton High School, Staunton

=== Madison County ===
- Alton Senior High School, Alton
- Civic Memorial High School, Bethalto
- Collinsville High School, Collinsville
- East Alton-Wood River High School, Wood River
- Edwardsville High School, Edwardsville
- Granite City High School, Granite City
- Highland High School, Highland
- Madison Senior High School, Madison
- Metro-East Lutheran High School, Edwardsville
- Roxana High School, Roxana
- Triad High School, Troy

=== Monroe County ===
- Columbia High School, Columbia
- Valmeyer High School, Valmeyer
- Waterloo High School, Waterloo

=== St. Clair County ===
- Belleville High School-East, Belleville
- Belleville High School-West, Belleville
- Berean Christian School, Fairview Heights
- Cahokia High School, Cahokia Heights
- Collinsville High School, Collinsville
- Dupo High School, Dupo
- East St. Louis Senior High School, East St. Louis
- Freeburg Community High School, Freeburg
- Lebanon High School, Lebanon
- Marissa Jr/Sr High School, Marissa
- Mascoutah Community High School, Mascoutah
- New Athens High School, New Athens
- O'Fallon Township High School, O'Fallon
- SIUE East St. Louis Charter High School, East St. Louis

== Missouri public schools ==
=== Franklin County ===
- New Haven High School — New Haven School District
- Pacific High School — Meramec Valley School District
- St. Clair High School — St. Clair R-XIII School District
- Sullivan High School — Sullivan School District
- Union High School — Union R-XI School District
- Washington High School — School District of Washington

=== Jefferson County ===
- Crystal City High School — Crystal City 47 Public Schools
- De Soto Senior High School — De Soto #73 School District
- Festus High School — Festus R-VI School District
- Fox C-6 School District
  - Fox High School
  - Seckman High School
- Herculaneum High School — Dunklin R-V School District
- Hillsboro High School — Hillsboro R-3 School District
- Jefferson R-VII High School — Jefferson R-7 School District
- Northwest High School — Northwest R-I School District

=== Lincoln County ===
- Elsberry High School — Elsberry R-II School District
- Troy Buchanan High School — Lincoln County R-III School District
- Silex High School — Silex R-I School District
- Windsor High School — Windsor C-1 School District

=== St. Charles County ===
- Fort Zumwalt School District
  - Fort Zumwalt East High School
  - Fort Zumwalt North High School
  - Fort Zumwalt South High School
  - Fort Zumwalt West High School
- Francis Howell School District
  - Francis Howell High School
  - Francis Howell Central High School
  - Francis Howell North High School
  - Francis Howell Union High School
- Orchard Farm High School — Orchard Farm School District
- City of St. Charles School District
  - St. Charles High School
  - St. Charles West High School
- Wentzville R-IV School District
  - Wentzville Holt High School
  - Wentzville Liberty High School
  - Timberland High School
  - North Point High School

=== St. Louis County ===
- Affton High School — Affton School District
- Bayless Senior High School — Bayless School District
- Brentwood High School — Brentwood School District
- Clayton High School — School District of Clayton
- Ferguson-Florissant School District
  - McCluer High School
  - McCluer North High School
  - STEAM Academy at McCluer South-Berkeley
- Hancock Senior High School — Hancock Place School District
- Hazelwood School District
  - Hazelwood Central High School
  - Hazelwood East High School
  - Hazelwood West High School
- Jennings High School — Jennings School District
- Kirkwood High School — Kirkwood School District
- Ladue Horton Watkins High School — Ladue School District
- Lindbergh High School — Lindbergh Schools
- Maplewood Richmond Heights High School — Maplewood Richmond Heights School District
- Mehlville School District
  - Mehlville High School
  - Oakville High School
- Normandy High School — Normandy Schools Collaborative
- Parkway School District
  - Fern Ridge High School
  - Parkway Central High School
  - Parkway North High School
  - Parkway South High School
  - Parkway West High School
- Pattonville High School — Pattonville School District
- Ritenour High School — Ritenour School District
- Riverview Gardens Senior High School — Riverview Gardens School District
- Rockwood School District
  - Eureka High School
  - Lafayette High School
  - Marquette High School
  - Rockwood Summit High School
- University City High School — School District of University City
- Valley Park High School — Valley Park School District
- Webster Groves High School — Webster Groves School District

=== City of St. Louis ===
- Charter schools
  - BELIEVE Academy by BELIEVE Schools
  - BELIEVE Middle College by BELIEVE Schools
  - Confluence Academy
  - Gateway Science Academy
  - Lift For Life Academy
  - St. Louis Language Immersion School: The Spanish School
  - KIPP: St Louis
- St. Louis Public Schools
  - Comprehensive schools
    - Carnahan High School of the Future
    - Northwest Transportation & Law
    - Roosevelt High School
    - Sumner High School
    - Vashon High School
  - Magnet schools
    - Central Visual and Performing Arts High School
    - Cleveland Junior Naval Academy
    - Clyde C. Miller Career Academy
    - Collegiate School of Medicine and Bioscience
    - Gateway STEM High School
    - Metro Academic and Classical High School
    - McKinley Classical Leadership Academy
    - Soldan International Studies High School

=== Warren County ===
- Warrenton High School — Warren County R-III School District
- Wright City High School — Wright City R-II School District

=== Washington County ===
- Kingston High School — Kingston K-14 School District
- Potosi High School — Potosi R-III School District
- Valley High School — Valley R-VI School District

== Private schools ==
=== Baptist ===
- Cornerstone Baptist Academy
- Meramec Valley Christian School
- Tower Grove Christian Academy
- Twin City Christian Academy

=== Catholic ===
==== Archdiocese of St. Louis ====
- Academy of St. Louis
- Bishop DuBourg High School
- Cardinal Ritter College Prep High School
- Duchesne High School
- St. Dominic High School
- St. Francis Borgia High School
- St. Pius X High School

==== Diocese of Belleville ====
- Althoff Catholic High School
- Gibault Catholic High School
- Mater Dei High School

==== Diocese of Springfield (Illinois) ====
- Father McGivney Catholic High School
- Marquette Catholic High School

==== Independent ====
- Chaminade College Preparatory School
- Chesterton Academy of St. Louis
- Christian Brothers College High School
- Cor Jesu Academy
- De Smet Jesuit High School
- Incarnate Word Academy
- Nerinx Hall High School
- Notre Dame High School
- Rosati-Kain Academy
- St. John Vianney High School
- St. Joseph's Academy
- Saint Louis Priory School
- St. Louis University High School
- St. Mary's South Side Catholic High School
- Ursuline Academy
- Villa Duchesne
- Visitation Academy of St. Louis

=== Christian Scientist ===
- The Principia

=== Lutheran ===
- Christ Our Rock Lutheran High School
- Lutheran High School North
- Lutheran High School South
- Lutheran High School of St. Charles County
- Metro East Lutheran High School (Edwardsville, Illinois)

=== Methodist ===
- Troy Holiness School

=== Non-denominational ===
- Christian Academy of Greater St. Louis
- Crosspoint Christian School
- Providence Classical Christian Academy
- North County Christian School
- Veritas Christian Academy
- Westminster Christian Academy

=== Non-sectarian ===
- Crossroads College Preparatory School
- The Fulton School
- Governor French Academy
- John Burroughs School
- Logos High School
- Mary Institute and St. Louis Country Day School
- Thomas Jefferson School
- Whitfield School

=== Orthodox Judaism ===
- Epstein Hebrew Academy

=== Pentecostal ===
- Apostolic Learning Academy (Dupo, Illinois)

== Closed schools ==
- Academy of the Sacred Heart (1818–1972)
- Augustinian Academy (1961–1972)
- Barat Academy (2007–2025)
- Beaumont High School (1926–2014)
- Berkeley High School (1937–2003)
- Central High School (1853–1984)
- De Andreis High School (1946–1976)
- Douglass High School (1926–1956)
- Gateway Academy (closed 2011)
- Imagine College Prep Charter High School (closed 2012)
- John F. Kennedy High School (1968–2017)
- Kinloch High School (1936–1976)
- Louis and Sarah Block Yeshiva High School (1978–2016)
- Northwest Academy of Law (1964–2022)
- St. Elizabeth Academy (1882–2013)
- St. Mary's Academy (1965–1990)
- Trinity Catholic High School (2003–2021)
  - Rosary High School (1961–2003)
  - St. Thomas Aquinas-Mercy High School (1985–2003)
    - Mercy High School (1948–1985)
    - St. Thomas Aquinas High School (1958–1985)
- William Cullen McBride High School (1925–1971)

== See also ==
- Education in Greater St. Louis
- Education in St. Louis
- List of high schools in Illinois
- List of high schools in Missouri
- List of school districts in Illinois
- List of school districts in Missouri
