= Cahokia Conference =

High school athletic conference in Illinois, US

- Conference: IHSA
- Founded: 1928
- No. of teams: 18
- Region: Southwestern Illinois (near St. Louis)

The Cahokia Conference is a high school athletic and competitive activity organization which currently consists of 18 schools in southwestern Illinois. All of the schools are located in Clinton, Madison, Marion, Monroe, Randolph, St. Clair, and Washington counties. The conference began in 1928.

== List of member schools ==
Dupo is a member of the Cahokia Conference in all sports except football, where it competes in the Prairie State Conference starting with the 2017 season. Carlyle will also not be a member for football starting in 2020 due to moving from 11-man football to 8-man football. However, Carlyle has since gone back to the 11-man format.

Two schools, Valmeyer and Steeleville, were added for the 2006–07 season. The addition split the conference into two divisions, the Mississippi and the Kaskaskia. Salem was admitted to the conference in 2017, joining the Mississippi Division. Salem would leave after 2025-26 to join the Southern Illinois River-to-River Conference, and Roxana would also be kicked out of the conference due to the school wanting to play football as an independent. However, the conference would gain Centralia for the Mississippi Division in 2026-27 following their departure from the South Seven Conference. The Mississippi Division would also see the introduction of Civic Memorial, Jersey, and re-introduction of Waterloo following the collapse of the Mississippi Valley Conference.

Expansion and realignment occurred starting with the 2022–23 school year. Chester, Okawville, Roxana, Sparta and East Alton-Wood River all joined the Cahokia. After all schools join, The conference would then realign into three divisions:

- Mississippi Division - Breese (Central), Columbia, Freeburg, Roxana, Salem and Wood River (East Alton-W.R.)
- Kaskaskia Division - Dupo, Lebanon, Marissa, New Athens, Steeleville, Valmeyer
- Illinois Division - Carlyle, Chester, Okawville, Red Bud, Sparta and Trenton (Wesclin)

=== Mississippi Division ===
| School | Location | Team name | Colors | County | School Enrollment (2025–26) | Year Joined | Previous Conference |
|---|---|---|---|---|---|---|---|
| Breese Central | Breese | Cougars | | Clinton | 639 | 1983 | Quad County |
| Centralia | Centralia | Orphans/Annies | | Marion | 853 | 2026 | South Seven |
| Civic Memorial | Bethalto | Eagles | | Madison | 755 | 2026 | Mississippi Valley |
| Columbia | Columbia | Eagles | | Monroe | 577 | 1960 | Kaskaskia |
| East Alton-Wood River | Wood River | Oilers | | Madison | 503 | 2021 | Prairie State |
| Freeburg | Freeburg | Midgets | | St. Clair | 657 | 1928 | |
| Jersey | Jerseyville | Panthers | | Jersey | 743 | 2026 | Mississippi Valley |
| Waterloo | Waterloo | Bulldogs | | Monroe | 816 | 19?? 2026 | Mississippi Valley |

=== Kaskaskia Division ===
| School | Location | Team name | Colors | County | School Enrollment (2025–26) | Year Joined | Previous Conference |
|---|---|---|---|---|---|---|---|
| Dupo^{1} | Dupo | Tigers | | St. Clair | 242 | 1928; 1971 | Quad county Midwestern |
| Lebanon | Lebanon | Greyhounds | | St. Clair | 130 | 1929 | |
| Marissa^{2} | Marissa | Meteors | | St. Clair | 137 | 1928; 1983 | |
| New Athens | New Athens | Yellow Jackets | | St. Clair | 145 | 1928 | |
| Steeleville | Steeleville | Warriors | | Randolph | 132 | 2006 | |
| Valmeyer | Valmeyer | Pirates | | Monroe | 100 | 2006 | |

=== Illinois Division ===
| School | Location | Team name | Colors | County | School Enrollment (2025–26) | Year Joined | Previous Conference |
|---|---|---|---|---|---|---|---|
| Carlyle | Carlyle | Indians | | Clinton | 258 | 1988 | Southwest Egyptian |
| Chester | Chester | Yellow Jackets | | Randolph | 314 | 2022 | Black Diamond-West |
| Okawville | Okawville | Rockets; Lady Rockets | | Washington | 147 | 2022 | Independent |
| Red Bud | Red Bud | Musketeers | | Randolph | 347 | 1972 | Chartres |
| Sparta | Sparta | Bulldogs | | Randolph | 298 | 2022 | Southern Illinois River-to-River |
| Wesclin | Trenton | Warriors | | Clinton | 328 | 1983 | |

1. Dupo played in Midwestern Conference 1956–71.
2. Marissa left in 1933, and rejoined in 1983.

=== Former Schools ===
Partial list, more schools to be added.

| School | Location | Team name | Colors | County | Year Joined | Previous Conference | Year Left | Conference Joined |
|---|---|---|---|---|---|---|---|---|
| O'Fallon | O'Fallon | Panthers | | St. Clair | 1928 | Independent (SWC 1926) | 1971 | Mississippi Valley |
| Roxana | Roxana | Shells | | Madison | 2022 | South Central | 2026 | Independent |
| Salem | Salem | Wildcats | | Marion | 2017 | Apollo | 2026 | Southern Illinois River-to-River |

== Sports ==
Each year a conference champion is determined in each division for volleyball, boys and girls basketball, baseball, and softball by each division member playing round-robin home and away. The team with the best win–loss record is the champion.

For boys and girls golf and boys soccer one champion is determined by round–robin play, with each school in the conference playing each other once. The team with the best win–loss record is the champion.

Cross country and track & field for boys and girls each have one champion determined by the winner of each sport's conference meet. The scholastic bowl champion is the winner of the conference tournament.

Like golf and soccer, the conference football championship is determined based on round–robin play. However, only seven teams (the Mississippi division and Dupo) field football teams. As noted above, Carlyle will begin 8-man play in 2020 moving the conference to 6 schools for the short-term.

There is no cross-over for conference play due to the size discrepancy between schools in the Mississippi Division and schools in the Kaskaskia Division.

== State trophies ==
=== Breese (Central) ===
- 1989 Scholastic Bowl Runner-Up
- 1992 Girls Volleyball Third Place (Class A)
- 1996 Girls Volleyball Champions (Class A)
- 1999 Girls Volleyball Third Place (Class A)
- 2005 Girls Volleyball Champions (Class A)
- 2006 Girls Volleyball Runner-Up (Class A)
- 2007 Girls Basketball Champions (Class A)
- 2007 Girls Volleyball Champions (Class 2A)
- 2009 Girls Track and Field Second Place (Class 1A)
- 2010 Girls Volleyball Second Place (Class 2A)
- 2010 Boys Basketball Fourth Place (Class 2A)
- 2011 Girls Volleyball Third Place (Class 2A)
- 2012 Girls Basketball Runner-Up (Class 2A)
- 2012 Boys Basketball Champions (Class 2A)
- 2013 Girls Competitive Cheerleading Third Place (Class S)
- 2014 Girls Volleyball Third Place (Class 2A)
- 2014 Girls Competitive Cheerleading Champions (Class S)
- 2015 Girls Competitive Cheerleading Champions (Class S)
- 2015 Girls Basketball Runner-Up (Class 2A)
- 2016 Girls Competitive Cheerleading Third Place (Class S)
- 2016 Boys Basketball Third Place (Class 2A)
- 2017 Girls Competitive Cheerleading Champions (Class S)
- 2018 Girls Basketball Fourth Place (Class 3A)
- 2021 Girls Competitive Cheerleading Third Place (Class S)

=== Carlyle ===
- 1981 Boys Baseball Champions (Class A)
- 1988 Football Champions (Class 2A)
- 1989 Boys Basketball Champions (Class A)
- 1995 Girls Basketball Runner-Up (Class A)
- 1996 Girls Basketball Champions (Class A)
- 1997 Girls Basketball Champions (Class A)
- 2016 Girls Competitive Cheerleading Runner-up (Small)

=== Columbia ===
- 1987 Baseball Champions (Class A)
- 2005 Girls Volleyball Runner-Up (Class A)
- 2006 Girls Soccer Runner-Up (Class A)
- 2006 Baseball Fourth Place (Class A)
- 2007 Scholastic Bowl Runner-Up (Class A)
- 2007 Baseball Champions (Class A)
- 2007 Football Runner-Up (Class 3A)
- 2008 Girls Soccer Third Place (Class A)
- 2009 Competitive Cheerleading Third Place (Class S)
- 2010 Competitive Cheerleading Champions (Class S)
- 2010 Boys Soccer Third Place (Class 1A)
- 2011 Competitive Cheerleading Champions (Class S)
- 2012 Competitive Cheerleading Champions (Class S)
- 2013 Competitive Cheerleading Champions (Class M)
- 2014 Boys Soccer Champions (Class 1A)
- 2015 Competitive Cheerleading Second Place (Class M)
- 2019 Girls Soccer Champions (Class 1A)

=== Dupo ===
- 1990 Baseball Runner-Up (Class A)
- 1996 Baseball Champions (Class A)
- 2009 Softball Fourth Place (Class 1A)
- 2016 Softball Runner-Up (Class 2A)

=== Freeburg ===
- 1956 Baseball Runner-Up
- 1977 Girls Archery State Champions
- 1977 Girls Volleyball Third Place (Class A)
- 1978 Girls Archery Second Place
- 1979 Girls Volleyball Champions (Class A)
- 1981 Girls Volleyball Fourth Place (Class A)
- 1982 Girls Volleyball Champions (Class A)
- 1985 Softball Champions (Class A)
- 1989 Baseball Champions (Class A)
- 2002 Baseball Runner-Up (Class A)
- 2003 Girls Track Champions (Class A)
- 2004 Girls Track Champions (Class A)
- 2005 Girls Track Third Place (Class A)
- 2008 Girls Volleyball Champions (Class 2A)
- 2009 Girls Volleyball Champions (Class 2A)
- 2014 Baseball Third Place (Class 2A)
- 2016 Boys Cross Country Runner-Up (Class A)
- 2020 Baseball Champions (Class 2A)

=== Lebanon ===
- 1976 Boys Cross Country Champions (Class A)
- 1977 Boys Track Runner-Up (Class A)
- 1997 Softball Runner-Up (Class A)
- 2008 Softball Fourth Place (Class 1A)
- 2010 Softball Runner-Up (Class 1A)
- 2010 Baseball Third Place (Class 1A)
- 2018 Girls Basketball Third Place (Class 1A)

=== Marissa ===
- 1986 Baseball Champions (Class A)
- 2008 Baseball Runner-Up (Class 1A)
- 2009 Baseball Runner-Up (Class 1A)

=== New Athens ===
- 1948 Baseball Runner-Up
- 1978 Baseball Runner-Up (Class A)
- 1979 Baseball Champions (Class A)
- 2013 Girls Volleyball Fourth Place (Class 1A)
- 2014 Baseball Fourth Place (Class 1A)

=== Red Bud ===
- 1974 Volleyball Third Place (Class A)
- 2002 Volleyball Third Place (Class A)

=== Steeleville ===
- 1993 Baseball Runner-Up (Class A)
- 2019 Baseball Third Place (Class A)
- 2022 Boys Basketball Fourth Place (Class 1A)

=== Trenton (Wesclin) ===
- 1981 Boys Cross Country Runner-Up (Class A)
- 1982 Boys Cross Country Champions (Class A)
- 1990 Boys Basketball Champions (Class A)
- 2002 Boys Bowling Runner-up (Class A)
- 2006 Baseball Runner-Up (Class A)
- 2009 Competitive Cheerleading Champions (Class S)
- 2012 Baseball Fourth Place (Class 2A)
- 2018 ICTM Math Team Tenth Place (Class 1A)

=== Valmeyer ===
- 2012 Girls Volleyball Fourth Place (Class 1A)
- 2017 Baseball Runner-up (Class 1A)
- 2018 Baseball Runner-up (Class 1A)

== Miscellaneous Facts ==
=== Baseball Achievements ===
No other small school athletic conference in the state of Illinois has claimed as many state baseball championships as the Cahokia Conference. The list of championships by current member teams includes 7 years (1979, 1981, 1986, 1987, 1989, 1996, and 2007), as well as 9 runner-up performances (1948, 1956, 1978, 1990, 1993, 2002, 2006, 2008, and 2009), and two third-place finishes (2010 & 2014).

=== 2005 Volleyball Championship ===
In the 2005 state volleyball tournament Breese Central defeated Columbia in the championship match. This was the first time in IHSA Volleyball history that two teams from the same conference met in the title match. Ironically, the conference champion of 2005 was Freeburg, which had moved to class AA and won the first ever AA regional for a school from this conference.
