= Mississippi Valley Conference (Illinois) =

High school athletic league in the Metro-East region of southwestern Illinois

- Conference: IHSA
- Founded: 1971
- Folded: 2026
- No. of teams: 6
- Region: Metro-East region of southwestern Illinois (Jersey, Madison, Monroe, and St. Clair counties)

The Mississippi Valley Conference is a high school athletic league in the Metro-East region of southwestern Illinois. It has schools from the counties of Jersey, Madison, Monroe, and St. Clair. All of its members are class "AA" in Illinois' two-class and three-class systems and "AAA" in the four-class system.

Locations of Mississippi Valley Schools

== Member schools (2026) ==
School	Location	Mascot	Colors	County	Enrollment	Year Joined	Previous Conference
Civic Memorial High School	Bethalto, Illinois	Eagles		Madison	766	1971	Midwestern
Highland High School	Highland, Illinois	Bulldogs		Madison	967	1971	Midwestern
Jersey Community High School	Jerseyville, Illinois	Panthers		Jersey	898	1971	Independent
Mascoutah Community High School	Mascoutah, Illinois	Indians		St. Clair	966	1971	Cahokia
Triad High School	Troy, Illinois	Knights		Madison	1,150	1971^{1} 1993	Midwestern; South Central
Waterloo High School	Waterloo, Illinois	Bulldogs		Monroe	838	1997	Cahokia

1. Triad left to become an Independent in 1978. They joined the SCC in 1985 prior to returning to the MVC.

=== Former members ===
School	Location	Mascot	Colors	County	Enrollment	Year Joined	Previous Conference	Year Left	Conference Joined
East Alton-Wood River High School	Wood River, Illinois	Oilers		Madison	527	1971	Southwestern	1997	South Central
O'Fallon Township High School	O'Fallon, Illinois	Panthers		St. Clair	2,473	1971	Cahokia	1993	South Seven
Roxana High School	Roxana, Illinois	Shells		Madison	538	1971	Midwestern	1997	South Central

== History ==
The Mississippi Valley Conference was formed in 1971 and has been one of the most stable conferences in Illinois high school athletics. The MVC was initially formed by Civic Memorial, Highland, Jersey Community, Mascoutah, O’Fallon, Roxana, Triad, and East Alton-Wood River High Schools. Ironically, the name Mississippi Valley had been used 2 times previous with the first occurrence happening in 1922 with teams from Macomb, Carthage, Pittsfield and Quincy from Illinois and Fort Madison and Keokuk in Iowa. This incarnation of the conference only lasted one season. In 1957, the name was resurrected with teams from East Moline, Moline and Rock Island from Illinois joining an Iowa conference by the same name that included teams from Cedar Rapids and Davenport Iowa. This league is still in operation today in Iowa, however, the three Illinois schools left at the end of the 1969 school year.

While conferences in Illinois have gone through many changes in membership, with some conferences expanding while others have disappeared over the years, the MVC has remained notably stable. O’Fallon withdrew in 1993 due to a significantly increasing student enrollment and joined the South Seven Conference, ultimately ending up as members of the Southwestern Conference. Triad left the MVC in 1979 but rejoined in 1993. Roxana and East Alton-Wood River withdrew from the Mississippi Valley in 1998 due to decreasing enrollment and joined the South Central Conference, where Roxana remains, while EAWR is now a member of the Prairie State Conference. Waterloo joined the MVC in 1998 to take the place of Roxana and East Alton-Wood River. The MVC currently has six schools, of which five are Charter members. During the 40+ year history of the league, there have only been three instances of schools entering or leaving the conference, and this is a point of pride for the MVC and its member schools. Mascoutah and Triad will be leaving the MVC for the Southwestern for the 26-27 school year. It was also announced that Highland would also be leaving at the end of the school year to join the South Seven Conference for 2026-27. With only three schools potentially competing for the 2026-27 season, the conference announced that it would be disbanding at the conclusion of the 2025-26 school year. The remaining members would end up joining the Cahokia Conference.

== Membership timeline ==
Full members Full members (non-football) Partial member (listed sports) Full members (8-man football) Full members (Football Coop) Other Conference

== Sports ==
A listing of the sports and the seasons they are played in:

Fall

- Boys' Cross-Country
- Girls' Cross-Country
- Football
- Boys' Golf
- Girls' Golf
- Boys' Soccer
- Girls' Tennis
- Volleyball

Winter

- Cheerleading
- Boys' Basketball
- Girls' Basketball
- Wrestling
- Boys Bowling
- Girls Bowling

Spring

- Boys' Baseball
- Girls' Soccer
- Girls' Softball
- Boys' Tennis
- Boys' Track and Field
- Girls' Track and Field

In addition, schools compete in activities such as bass fishing, competitive cheerleading, competitive dance, and scholastic bowl - though none of those are organized at the conference level.

=== State Trophies ===
Bethalto (Civic Memorial)

- Competitive Dance: 2nd (1A-2013)
- Softball: 4th (3A-2011)

Highland

- Softball: 1st (3A-2021)
- Baseball: 1st (3A-2008, 3A-2015)
- Bass Fishing: 1st (2012)
- Competitive Dance: 1st (1A-2014)

Mascoutah

- Football: 1st (3A-1979)
- Softball: 4th (AA-1991)
- Speech, Individual Events: 2nd (1965)

Troy (Triad)

- Baseball: 4th (3A-2012)
- Boys Soccer: 3rd (2A-2009)
- Competitive Cheerleading: 1st (M-2005), 3rd (M-2008)
- Competitive Dance: 2nd (1A-2015)
- Girls Soccer: 1st (2A-2011), 2nd (A-2003), 1st (2A-2017)
- Wrestling: 4th (2A-2009)

Waterloo (H.S.)

- Baseball: 3rd (3A-2011)
- Boys Soccer: 3rd (2A-2010), 1st (2A-2017)
- Football: 2nd (3A-1993)

=== All-Conference teams ===
- 2023-2024

Boys Basketball All Conference Teams
Player	School	Year	Team	Position	Misc.
Jaxon Brunaugh	Jersey	Junior	1st Team	Guard	
Jake Ottensmeier	Highland	Senior	1st Team	Guard	
Garrin Stone	Highland	Junior	1st Team		
Jayden McCoo	Mascoutah	Junior	1st Team	Guard	MVP
Miles Ntekop	Mascoutah	Senior	1st Team	Center	
Drew Winslow	Triad	Junior	1st Team		
Braxdon Decker	Highland		2nd Team		
Corey Harris	Mascoutah	Junior	2nd Team	Guard	
Ethan Stewart	Triad	Junior	2nd Team	Guard	
Adam Ogden	Civic Memorial	Junior	2nd Team	Guard	
August Frankford	Civic Memorial	Junior	2nd Team	Forward	
Francis Vogel	Jersey	Senior	Honorable Mention	Guard	
Grant Fleming	Highland	Junior	Honorable Mention	Forward	
Trey Koisher	Highland	Senior	Honorable Mention	Guard	
Tyler Thompson	Triad	Sophomore	Honorable Mention	Guard	
Landon Zawodniak	Triad	Senior	Honorable Mention		
Jacob Jung	Mascoutah	Senior	Honorable Mention	Forward	

Girls Basketball All Conference Teams
Player	School	Year	Team	Position	Misc.
Tessa Crawford	Jersey	Senior	1st Team	Guard	Co-MVP
Larissa Taylor	Highland	Senior	1st Team	Center	Co-MVP
Abby Schultz	Highland	Senior	1st Team		
Lauren Maas	Highland	Senior	2nd Team		
Jordan Bircher	Highland	Sophomore	2nd Team		
Meredith Gray	Jersey	Sophomore	2nd Team	Center	
Ella Smith	Jersey	Junior	Honorable Mention	Guard	
Sophie Schroeder	Highland	Sophomore	Honorable Mention		
