= South Central Conference (Illinois) =

- Conference: IHSA
- Founded: 1926
- No. of teams: 10
- Region: South Central Illinois

The South Central Conference (SCC) is a conference in South Central Illinois made up of ten schools. The SCC was established in 1926 with ten charter schools. The current schools are all full members of the Illinois High School Association.

Locations of Current South Central Schools

== History ==
Named for its location in the state of Illinois, the South Central Conference was formed in 1926 with 10 schools. The charter schools included; Carlinville, Gillespie, Hillsboro, Litchfield, Mt. Olive, Nokomis, Pana, Shelbyville, Staunton and Taylorville. Only six years into the league, however, Shelbyville would drop out in 1932 and Litchfield would follow in 1934. Benld High School would join in 1935 and the conference would stay status quo for 10 years.

A wave of change occurred in 1944 as Hillsboro, Nokomis, Pana and Taylorville would all leave the South Central for the newly formed Mid State Conference. This exodus resulted in a 5 team football conference that would not change until 1955. Prior to the 1955 school year, Nokomis would rejoin the league as well as Piasa South Western. South Western would only remain in the conference for 6 years, leaving in 1961. That same year, Benld High School was consolidated into Gillespie High School, reducing the number of schools back down to only 5 schools playing football. In 1963, Springfield Feitshans entered the conference and Virden High School joined in 1966. In 1967, Feitshans would close and all of attending students would go to the newly constructed Springfield Southeast High School and leave the South Central, moving to the Capitol Conference. As the 1960s came to a close, the total number of schools remained at six.

In 1970, Piasa South Western came back to the league and the South Central would hold at seven teams throughout the entirety of the decade. Litchfield would make its return in 1980 as well as a new entry White Hall North Greene. In that same year, Mt. Olive would leave the conference and the total number of schools would increase to eight. Another mass exodus would occur in 1985 as Nokomis, Virden and North Greene High Schools would leave the conference for the newly created Prairie State Conference. However, in that same year, St. Jacob Triad High School would join the league from the Midwestern Conference. As the 1980s came to a close, the total number of schools was down to six.

Triad would leave the league in 1993, entering the Mississippi Valley Conference, however, Alton Marquette would take their place that same year. The South Central would reach its largest number of schools in 1997 when Hillsboro and Pana would rejoin the league and new schools; Greenville, Roxana, Vandalia, and East Alton-Wood River came aboard. With 12 teams, the conference would split into two divisions West, which included; Carlinville, Wood River, Gillespie, Marquette, Roxana and Southwestern and the East, which included; Greenville, Hillsboro, Litchfield, Pana, Staunton and Vandalia. The league would remain at 12 teams for a dozen years, only changing in 2009 when Gillespie and Staunton would leave for the Prairie State Conference. The conference made another push for realignment in 2010 and "kicked out" Marquette, Wood River and Roxana, giving them a two year window for locating a new conference. Marquette and Wood River would move to the Prairie State, however, when Nokomis backed out of their membership agreement, Roxana was invited to stay in the South Central.

When the 2012 school year began, not only did Gillespie and Staunton return, the South Central removed the divisions and consisted of one division with 10 schools. Those schools included; Carlinville, Gillespie, Greenville, Hillsboro, Litchfield, Pana, Roxana, Southwestern, Staunton and Vandalia. Coops have emerged in the league during the 2010s with Litchfield cooping with Lincolnwood from 2014 through 2016 as well as cooping with Mt. Olive High School from 2022. Additionally, Staunton developed two different coops during the decade. First with Mt. Olive in 2019 and 2020, and with Bunker Hill starting in 2021.

In 2020, Roxana received an invitation to the Cahokia Conference to begin in the 2021 school year. To keep the conference at 10 schools, the South Central reached out to Virden North Mac and they entered the league in 2022.

== Member schools ==
School	Location	Mascot	Colors	County	Enrollment	Class	Year Joined	Previous Conference
Carlinville High School	Carlinville, Illinois (5,917)	Cavaliers		Macoupin	434	2A	1926	Independents
Gillespie High School	Gillespie, Illinois (3,319)	Miners		Macoupin	364	2A	1926^{1} 2012	Independents; Prairie State
Greenville High School	Greenville, Illinois (7,000)	Comets		Bond	537	2A	1997	Mid-State
Hillsboro High School	Hillsboro, Illinois (6,207)	Hiltoppers		Montgomery	499	2A	1926^{2} 1997	Independents; Mid-State
Litchfield High School	Litchfield, Illinois (6,939)	Purple Panthers		Montgomery	420	2A	1926^{3} 1980	Independents; Mid-State
North Mac High School	Virden, Illinois (3,000)	Panthers		Macoupin	420	2A	2022	Sangamo
Pana High School	Pana, Illinois (5,847)	Panthers		Christian	407	2A	1926^{2} 1997	Independents; Mid-State
Southwestern High School	Piasa, Illinois ()	Piasa Birds		Macoupin	488	2A	1955^{5} 1970	none (new school); Illinois Valley
Staunton High School	Staunton, Illinois (5,139)	Bulldogs		Macoupin	375	2A	1926^{1} 2012	Independents; Prairie State
Vandalia Community High School	Vandalia, Illinois (7,042)	Vandals		Fayette	423	2A	1997	Mid-State

1. Gillespie and Staunton left in 2009 to join the PSC, then returned in 2012.
2. Hillsboro and Pana left in 1944 to help found the MSC, then returned in 1997.
3. Litchfield left the conference in 1934, rejoining in 1980.
4. Roxana was kicked out of the conference in 2012, then readmitted as the 10th member after Nokomis rejected an offer. Roxana left the SCC in 2020 to join the Cahokia Conference.
5. Southwestern left for the IVC in 1961, then returned in 1970.

== Former members ==
This is a partial list, more schools may have been members.

School	Location	Mascot	Colors	County	Year Joined	Previous Conference	Year Left	Conference Joined
Mount Olive High School	Mount Olive, Illinois	Wildcats		Macoupin	1926	Independents	1980	Egyptian Illini
Nokomis High School	Nokomis, Illinois	Redskins		Montgomery	1926; 1955	Independents; MSM	1944; 1985	Mid-State; Prairie State
Shelbyville High School	Shelbyville, Illinois	Rams		Shelby	1926	Independents	1934	Independents
Taylorville High School	Taylorville, Illinois	Tornadoes		Christian	1926	Independents	1944	Mid-State
Benld	Benld, Illinois	Indians		Macoupin	1935	Independents	1961	none (consolidated into Gillespie)
Feitshans	Springfield, Illinois	Flyers		Sangamon	1963	Independents	1967	Capitol
Virden	Virden, Illinois	Bulldogs		Macoupin	1966	MSM	1985	Prairie State
North Greene	White Hall, Illinois	Huskies		Greene	1980	Independents (IVC 1974)	1985	Western Illinois Valley
Triad High School	Troy, Illinois	Knights		Madison	1985	Independents (MVC 1978)	1993	Mississippi Valley
Marquette Catholic High School	Alton, Illinois	Explorers		Madison	1993	Independents	2012	Prairie State
East Alton-Wood River High School	Wood River, Illinois	Oilers		Madison	1997	Mississippi Valley	2012	Prairie State
Roxana High School	Roxana, Illinois (1,542)	Shells		Madison	1997	Mississippi Valley	2020^{4}	Cahokia Conference

== Membership timeline ==
Full members Full members (Football Coop) Illinois Valley Conference MSM Conference Mid State Conference Prairie State Conference
