= Triad High School (Illinois) =

American high school in southern Illinois

Location
- 703 E. HWY 40; Troy, Illinois 62294; United States; 38.71545°N 89.85658°W

Information
- Type: Public high school
- Established: 1999; 27 years ago
- Principal: Joshua Ackerman
- Faculty: 75.53 (FTE)
- Grades: 9–12
- Enrollment: 1,209 (2025–26)
- Student to teacher ratio: 15.73
- Colors: Red, black, and white
- Athletics conference: Mississippi Valley Conference
- Nickname: (Lady) Knights
- Rival: Highland High School
- Website: triadhs.tcusd2.org

Triad High School is a high school located in Troy, Illinois. Triad serves the communities of Troy, St. Jacob, and Marine, Illinois, and small portions of Collinsville, Maryville, Glen Carbon, Edwardsville and Highland. The school district has a total area of 121.5 square miles (315 km^{2}). The majority of Triad High School students live in Troy, Illinois, a town 18 miles (29 km) northeast of St. Louis, Missouri.

== History ==
When the Triad district was formed, a contest was held to decide a name for the school which would serve the communities. Students in the district had gone to St. Jacob High School, Marine High School, and McCray-Dewey High School of Troy. All three high schools closed down upon the formation of the Triad school district.

Triad High School was originally located in St. Jacob, Illinois from the 1959–60 school year through the 1998–99 school year. Since the school year of 1999–2000, the Triad High School campus has been located in Troy, Illinois. The St. Jacob campus now serves as Triad Middle School, which serves the sixth through eighth grades as a feed-in school to Triad High School.

== Athletics ==
The Triad High School athletic teams originally competed in the now defunct Midwestern Conference before moving to the South Central Conference. In the 1993–94 school year, Triad moved to the Mississippi Valley Conference (MVC) due to enrollment growth, replacing O'Fallon Township High School. The MVC currently consists of six schools: Bethalto's Civic Memorial High School, Highland High School, Jerseyville's Jersey Community High School, Mascoutah Community High School, Troy's Triad High School, and Waterloo High School. Triad's colors are red, black, and white and their mascot is the Knights. Triad has the following sports programs:

Fall sports	Winter sports	Spring sports
Boys' cross-country	Boys' basketball	Boys' baseball
Girls' cross-country	Girls' basketball	Girls' soccer
Football	Cheerleading	Girls' softball
Boys' golf	Wrestling	Boys' tennis
Girls' golf	Hockey	Boys' track & field
Boys' soccer		Girls' track & field
Girls' tennis		Bass Fishing
Girls' volleyball		Trap Shooting

=== Rivalries ===
Triad had a rivalry with both Highland High School and Collinsville High School, however recently their main rival has become neighboring Highland High School. Highland usually competes with them in major sporting events such as football and baseball and other activities such as marching band.

=== Cheerleading ===
The Triad varsity cheerleading squad won Illinois Cheerleading Coaches Association (ICCA) state titles in 2001 and 2002 in the Medium Varsity division. In 2006, they became the first squad to win both state championships (ICCA and IHSA). That was the first year that the Illinois High School Association considered cheerleading a sport.

=== State championships ===
In 1974, senior Fritz Nemsky became Triad High School's first state champion by winning the class "A" heavyweight wrestling championship.

In 2007, junior Erin Wykoff became the school's first female state champion and first state champion in the biggest school division. She won the class "AA" discus championship at the IHSA State Track and Field Finals with a throw of 147 ft 9 in (45.03 m). Her twin sister, Kristin, finished 9th the same year.

In 2011, senior Elizabeth Hampl captured a state championship in shot put. She won the "AA" shot put championship at the IHSA Track and Field Finals with a throw of 43 ft 5.5 in (13.246 m).

In 2011, the Triad Knights girls' soccer team won the Class 2A State Championship on penalty kicks 4–1 over Marian following a 1–1 tie in regulation time.

In 2016, senior Adam Nelson won a state championship in the 100 meter dash. He won the 2A boys title at the IHSA Track and Field finals with a time of 10.72 seconds.

In 2017, the Triad Knights girls' soccer team won the Class 2A State Championship on penalty kicks 5–4 against Wheaton Academy after a scoreless tie in regulation time.

In 2021, the Triad Knights girls' soccer team won the Class 2A State Championship 1–0 in regulation time against Joliet Catholic. With their win, the Lady Knights became the first team in school history to finish a season undefeated with their 24–0–1 record.

In 2022, sophomore Colby Crouch became Triad High School's youngest individual state champion by winning the 120 weight division in wrestling.

In 2022, the Triad Knights girls' soccer team won the Class 2A State Championship 1–0 against Benet Academy.

== Activities ==
Triad High School also offers many extra-curricular activities that are not considered sports by the IHSA. Triad sponsors Model UN, Envirothon, Color Guard, Dance, Scholar Bowl, Band, Chorus, Jazz Band, Robotics, and many other clubs that do not compete interscholastically.

The Triad High School Music Dept. is ranked 8th in the state of Illinois in the Illinois High School Association Sweepstakes.

=== Envirothon ===
Triad Envirothon placed first in Illinois state Envirothon competitions in 2000, 2005, and 2007. In those years, the team went on to represent the state of Illinois at the North American Envirothon Competition.

=== Theatre & drama ===
Triad High School's Theatre department has had various productions through the years. Every spring, the school has a musical as well as a play every fall. Since the school's formation, it has had the same theater facility; however, as of March 2026, construction of a new theater began outside of the cafetorium.

=== Dance team ===
The Triad Varsity Dance Team won the school's first dance state title in 2009 at the IDTA State Finals in the AA Pom/Dance category. The dance team also won the TDI state title in the A Kick category and also the IDTA state title in the AA kick category in 2011.
