= Vandalia Baptist Association =

The Vandalia Baptist Association, a precursor to the Centralia Baptist Association and Kaskaskia Baptist Association, was organized in 1840 and centered in the Vandalia, Illinois, area. It originated from the Saline Fraternity, which was organized in 1834, which in turn was an offspring of the Old South District of the Friends of Humanity.

== History ==
In October 1840, a meeting was held with Union Church, six miles southwest of Patoka, Illinois, for the purpose of forming a new Baptist Association. The following churches located in the South Central Illinois counties of Fayette, Marion, and Clinton were represented: Vandalia, Salem, Marshall Creek, Bethel, Clinton Hill, Diamond Springs, and Beaver Creek. The ministers present were Rev. George Stacy, Rev. W. F. Boyakin, Rev. S. K. Kellam, and Rev. J. R. Ford. The organization was completed by the adoption of the associational constitution and the election of a moderator, clerk, standing secretary and treasurer.

The association took its name from the old state capital and was hence known as the Vandalia Baptist Association. The first annual meeting of the association was held in Vandalia. During the ensuing twenty years (1841–1861) the following churches came into the association: Shoal Creek, Wabash, Liberty, Bear Creek, Fosterburg, Clear Creek, and Zion Hill. Among the ministers connected with the body during this period were Rev. Joseph Taylor, Rev. Joseph Huey, Rev. William Steele, Rev. E.A. Cooley, Rev. T. B. Grubb, Rev. W. J. Goldsborough, Rev. A. J. McClelland, and Rev. I. A. Dale.

== Missions ==
Around 1847, the association felt a great call to do missions. In 1851, Rev. William Steele and Rev. J. R. Ford engaged in missions under appointment of the Baptist Convention of Southern Illinois, the latter supplying eight churches. In 1853, Rev. J. R. Ford and Rev. Nathan Arnett were appointed missionaries, but on account of sickness served only a few days. In the fall of 1854, Rev. I. H. Elkin devoted part of his time as associational missionary.

The association adopted a resolution in 1858 endorsing the efforts of the Domestic Missions Society. The resolution states:

"We approve of the Domestic Missions Society formed within the bounds of our Association since its last meeting for the purpose of procuring more preaching in said bounds. We recommend the Executive Committee to make an effort to procure preaching at least two Sabbaths in each month in all the churches in our Association." A motion was passed in 1867 "that a brief history of some of the churches be written and published with the minutes." This was not carried out beyond one or two years.

In 1867, Missionary Elder J. R. Ford reported that he traveled 1,205 miles during the year, preached 155 sermons, baptized 19 converts, and collected $339.80. His entire salary of $500 was raised by the association.

During the annual meeting of 1868, the association addressed the question of recognizing baptisms from church candidates from other denominations.

"Shall we receive the baptism by ministers of other denominations when administered in accordance with our principles and practices? This question has been for years differently decided by different Baptist churches, and as every Gospel church has control of its own internal affairs, we think that as to the course to be pursued in the matter, the individual church should be the sole judge."

In 1870, there were but two Baptist Sunday Schools in the association. By 1871, seven thriving Sunday Schools were reported and a new Sunday School Convention held three engaging sessions that year.

In 1872, there were reported seven Sunday Schools, 41 officers and teachers, 396 students, and $96.40 raised for all purposes. George M. Sanders was president of the convention and John Andereck, clerk.

At the meeting in 1875, several books were purchased from the Baptist Publication Society by friends and presented to J.C. Carter, W. R. Andereck, and J. Holloway. Prominent deceased associational lay members were honored at this meeting: James Joliff, John Carter, Samuel McClelland, James Chance, John Wright, Jeremiah Gilmore, William Craig, Asa Entrikin, Smuth Moore, W. R. Huey, J. R. Tolbert, and Isaac Andereck.

At the annual meeting of 1878, the following resolution was passed:

"Believing that the custom of electing pastors annually is unscriptural as well as a cause of much division in our churches, we recommend that such a practice be abolished, and that churches retain their pastors so long as they are useful."

Twenty years between 1861 and 1881, the following churches joined the association: Center Church, Collins Station, Patoka, Bethlehem, Vandalia, Wisetown, Shobonier, Good Hope, Liberty, and First Baptist Salem.

At the annual meeting in 1880, the association voted to reorganize itself as the Centralia Baptist Association because of recent additions of churches south of Centralia, Illinois.
