= Chester High School =

Chester High School may refer to:

- Chester High School (California)
- Chester High School (Chester, Illinois)
- Chester High School (Montana)
- Chester High School (Chester, Pennsylvania)
- Chester High School (South Carolina)
- Chester High School (South Dakota)
- Chester High School (Texas)
