= Kaskaskia Baptist Association =

Founded in 1840, the Kaskaskia Baptist Association is a Southern Baptist ministry centered in Patoka, Illinois and is active in ministry to people in Southern and South Central Illinois. Named after the Kaskaskia River, it consists of thirty-three churches in Southern and South Central Illinois, and in recent years has become involved with the Southern Illinois Hispanic Outreach Project, a cooperative missions agency working with Hispanics throughout Southern Illinois. Bimonthly it publishes the Kaskaskia Baptist Visitor, a newsletter with a circulation of about 1,000 that reports on mission projects and church news from throughout the association.

== History ==
The Kaskaskia Baptist Association has a unique history. It was formed as the Vandalia Baptist Association in 1840 by three converging movements: The Friends of Humanity, which was the group of Anti-slavery Baptists led by the Lemen family, the Sunday School Movement, and the Missions Movement, both of which were led by John Mason Peck, who was sent by the Northern (American) Baptists from the East. The Vandalia Baptist Association was the fifth association formed by the Friends of Humanity. Many of the churches within the present Kaskaskia Baptist Association, which predate the association, seemed to have simultaneously been formed by the Sunday School Movement and the anti-slavery movement. Neither of these movements, however, worked together at the time.

Many of the founding churches still exist today. The association has never disbanded, but rather has had three different names which were changed in order to accommodate the changes of boundaries as new areas joined. The name changed from Vandalia Baptist Association to Centralia Baptist Association to assimilate churches in Mt. Vernon and Centralia in 1880. The name of the association again changed in 1912 to the Kaskaskia Baptist Association when churches left the Northern (American) Baptist denomination to become Southern Baptist.

In the year 2007, records from the association from 1845 to 1910 will be available on the Kaskaskia Baptist Association website. Eventually all historical records will be available on the website. Also at the website there is a complete history online of the churches as well as a timeline history of the association.
