= Roger Counsil =

American gymnastics coach

- Full name: Roger L. Counsil
- Born: January 11, 1935 Wood River, Illinois, U.S.
- Died: August 8, 2017 (aged 82) Wilmington Island, Georgia, U.S.

Gymnastics career
- Discipline: Men's artistic gymnastics

Roger L. Counsil (January 11, 1935 – August 8, 2017) was a former American gymnastics coach, and head of the United States Gymnastics Federation, now known as USA Gymnastics.

== Biography ==
Counsil was born on January 11, 1935, in Wood River, Illinois. He attended East Alton–Wood River High School and graduated in 1954.

He was an athlete at Southern Illinois University, where he competed in track, swimming, and gymnastics. He was the NAIA 1-meter diving champion in 1957, the same year he was named the "Most Valuable Athlete" at SIU. In addition to his bachelor's degree, he earned his Master's from SIU and completed his doctorate in Higher Education Administration at Indiana University Bloomington.

For 17 years, he coached at Indiana State University.

Counsil was named Olympic coach for the U.S.-boycotted 1980 Summer Olympics and held several other positions. These included:

- Chairman of the NCAA Gymnastics Committee.
- Men's coach for the U.S. team in the 1978 World Games .
- Host coach for the 1975 NCAA National Championships in Terre Haute.
- National "Coach of the Year" and four-time recipient of Mideast "Coach of the Year" honors.
- Executive Director of the USA Gymnastics, a position he assumed after leaving ISU in February 1980.

In 1980, he was inducted into the Southern Illinois University Athletics Hall of Fame. In 1985, he was inducted into the Indiana State University Athletics Hall of Fame. On August 8, 2014, he was selected as an Institutional Great by the Missouri Valley Conference and inducted into the Conference Hall of Fame.

== Death ==
Counsil died on August 8, 2017, at the age of 82.
