= Southwestern High School (Illinois) =

American high school in southern Illinois

Location
- 8226 Rt. 111; Piasa, Illinois; United States; 39.1190°N 90.1404°W

Information
- Type: Public High School
- Principal: Nicole Nance
- Teaching staff: 31.28 (FTE)
- Grades: 9–12
- Enrollment: 376 (2023–2024)
- Student to teacher ratio: 12.02
- Colors: Kelly green and gold
- Nickname: Piasa Birds
- Website: www.piasabirds.net/schools/high-school/index

Southwestern High School is a high school for grades 9–12 students located near Piasa, Illinois. It serves students from southwestern Macoupin and eastern Jersey counties in Illinois. Towns served by the high school are Brighton, Medora, Shipman, Piasa, Fidelity, Royal Lakes, Kemper, Plainview, and Summerville.

The school is commonly referred to as SWHS and is home to the Southwestern Piasa Birds. Southwestern is a member of the South Central Conference (Illinois).

== Athletics ==
=== Baseball ===
The baseball team plays during the spring. The team has won ten IHSA Regional Titles and two IHSA Sectional Titles. In 1990, the Piasa Birds finished fourth in the IHSA Class A State Tournament.

=== Boys Basketball ===
The SWHS boys' basketball team has won 15 IHSA Regional Titles and two IHSA Sectional Titles.

=== Boys Bowling ===
Bowling is played during the winter.

=== Boys Cross Country ===
Cross Country is a club sport at SWHS and its season is in the fall.

=== Boys Soccer ===
Soccer is offered, but a team has not been organized since 2019 due to lack of student interest. Soccer was added during the 2013–14 school year.

=== Boys Track and Field ===
The boys' track team competes in the spring. The SWHS track program has won one IHSA Class A Sectional Title in 2009.

=== Football ===
The football team plays during the fall. SWHS has qualified for the IHSA State Playoffs 11 times, but has yet to win a playoff game.

=== Girls Basketball ===
The SWHS girls' basketball team has won 18 IHSA Regional Titles and three IHSA Sectional titles. In 1991, the Lady Piasa Birds placed third in the IHSA Class A State Basketball Tournament.

=== Girls Bowling ===
Bowling is played during the winter.

=== Girls Cross Country ===
Cross Country is a club sport at SWHS and its season is in the fall. SWHS won an IHSA Class A Regional title in 2007.

=== Girls Soccer ===
Girls at SWHS play soccer during the spring season. Soccer was added during the 2013–14 school year.

=== Girls Track and Field ===
The girls' track team competes in the spring. The SWHS track program has won three IHSA Class A Sectional Titles in the years: 2001, 2010, and 2011.

=== Golf ===
Golf competes on the team in the fall. Boys' and girls' teams are organized based on the level of interest.

=== Softball ===
Softball is a girls' spring sport at SWHS. The Lady Piasa Birds have won nine IHSA Regional Titles and five IHSA Sectional Titles. In 2003 and 2009, SWHS finished second in the IHSA Class A State Tournament. In 2006, the team finished third in the IHSA Class A State Tournament. In 2008, the Lady Birds finished fourth in the IHSA Class 2A State Tournament.

=== Volleyball ===
Volleyball is a girls' fall sport at SWHS. In 2010, the Lady Piasa Birds won the South Central Conference Championship.

== Activities ==
=== Scholastic Bowl ===
The Scholastic Bowl team plays from August to May. The SWHS team has won 11 IHSA Class 1A Regional Titles, and one IHSA Class 2A Regional Title. The Piasa Birds won the NAQT Small School State Championship in 2017. They have also placed second in the NAQT Small School State Championship Tournament five times. SWHS has placed fourth, fifth (twice), seventh (three times), and eleventh at the NAQT Small School National Championship Tournament, which has been hosted in Minneapolis, Atlanta, and Chicago.
