= Waterloo Community Unit School District 5 =

School district in Monroe County, Illinois, United States

Address
- 302 Bellefontaine Drive Waterloo, Illinois, 62298; United States

District information
- Type: Public
- Grades: PreK–12
- NCES District ID: 1741070

Students and staff
- Students: 2,687 (2020–2021)

Other information
- Website: www.wcusd5.net

Waterloo Community Unit School District is a unified school district located in Waterloo, which is both one of the largest cities in and the county seat of Monroe County, which is located in the southwest reaches of the state of Illinois. It is composed of five schools: three elementary schools, one junior high school, and one senior high school. W. J. Zahnow Elementary School serves students in grades PK-1; this picks up at Rogers Elementary School, which educates students anywhere in between second grade and third grade. Gardner Elementary School educates students anywhere in between fourth grade and fifth grade. Waterloo Junior High School serves grades six through eight, while this picks up at Waterloo High School, which serves the last of the four grades. The current superintendent of Waterloo's school district is Brian Charon. The principal of Zahnow Elementary is Mary Gardner; the principal at Rogers Elementary is named Brian Smith; Nick Schwartz governs Waterloo Junior High School; and lastly, Lori Costello is principal of Waterloo Senior High School.
