= Centralia Baptist Association =

The Vandalia Baptist Association (1840–1880) was renamed the Centralia Baptist Association when churches from Centralia, Mt. Vernon and other churches south of Centralia, Illinois joined the Association in 1881. It was renamed the Kaskaskia Baptist Association (Southern Baptist) in 1912.

== History ==
At the annual meeting in 1880, a committee consisting of Rev. J.R. Ford, Rev. Levi Elliot, and Rev. E.A. Ince was appointed "to consider the propriety of calling a convention or a mass meeting to organize a new Association." This committee, therefore, (with Rev. Gilbert Frederick substituted for his predecessor, Rev. E.A. Ince) called a convention of the churches in the Vandalia Baptist Association to meet at Centralia on July 12, 1881. At this meeting it was recommended to the Centralia and Mount Vernon churches that they obtain letters from their Associations and unite with the Vandalia Baptist Association under the name "Centralia." These recommendations were adopted by the churches at their annual meeting in 1881 and so the name of the association changed from "Vandalia" to the "Centralia Baptist Association."

In 1883, the Centralia Baptist Association resolved to take up annual collections in January for foreign missions, in April for Ministerial Education, in July for the publication of Society and Sunday School work and in October for the general association. In 1885, Rev. Gilbert Frederick departed to "cross the great deep" on his missionary work. In 1889, the Associational Women's Home Missions Society was organized. In 1892, a suggestion was made that there be a committee appointed on "Young People's Work," not only for work in the association, but to confer with other associations. The moderator appointed Carrie E. Perrine, Jessie Shoupe, and H.T. Cunningham.

== University of Chicago Controversy ==
In 1896, the University of Chicago human origin and Bible controversy began and the association responded with the following resolution: "Whereas, we have been creditably informed that Dr. W.R. Harper, President of the University of Chicago, has said he does not know whether man was made of the dust of the earth, and does not know whether Eve was made of the rib taken from Adam's side, and has declared that he cannot, in brief, say that he accepts absolutely the story of Jonah and the fish and the Hebrews in the fiery furnace, and that the New Testament is not dependent on the freedom of its writers from fallibility in matters of historical and literary criticism, and whereas, if one part of the Bible is untrustworthy, it is all untrustworthy, and the statements of Dr. Harper tend to undermine the faith of the common people and the Holy Scriptures as the Word of God." The Centralia Baptist Association thus decided to recommend to their pastors and churches that they withhold funding and support from the University of Chicago until they could be "convinced that it stands for the Old Faith and for the Word of God as held by Baptists."

== Separation from American Baptists ==
In 1907 there was avid discussion of state association affairs. At this time American Baptists within the association decided to become Southern Baptists. They decided on the following resolution:

"Whereas, our national Societies connected with the Northern Baptist Convention are committed to what is known as the 'Federation of Churches,' and to union and cooperation with open communion Baptists; therefore, we recognize the right of each Baptist Church to work through whatever Baptist group it pleases. We as an association will cooperate with the Baptist Missionary Convention of Illinois, and in doing general home and foreign work with the Southern Baptist Convention. We recommend that the Sunday Schools use the literature of the Sunday School Board of the Southern Baptist Convention." At this meeting, Bethany Baptist withdrew from the Centralia Baptist Association and decided to become a part of the Alton American Baptist Association.

== A Call for Temperance ==
In 1910, the association made a statement that "we deeply deplore the awful drink that is destroying thousands of our citizens every year, and bringing poverty and misery upon thousands more, and is subversive of all law, and to tends to anarchy. We earnestly urge all our people to use all possible honorable means to destroy it from the face of the earth. To this end, we commend the work of the Anti-Saloon League, and all other organizations which are laboring to stamp out the awful curse, and urge all our people to support it in its work, and to vote for no man in office who will not firmly pledge himself to use his influence to destroy liquor traffic."

== Churches that Joined the Centralia Baptist Association ==
Between 1881 and 1912, the following churches joined the association: First Baptist Centralia, First Baptist Mount Vernon, Wisetown, Smith Grove, Keyesport, Bethania, Harmony, Second Baptist (Patoka), Kinmundy, Vandalia First Baptist, Iuka, Central City, Mulberry Grove, Pocahontas, Arm Prairie, Sandoval, Brubaker, Bear Creek, Mt. Carmel, Friendship, Odin and Hudelson Orphanage.

At the annual meeting of 1912, a motion was made by W.W. Hodge that the name of the Centralia Baptist Association be changed to the Kaskaskia Baptist Association which it has been called ever since.
