= Brent Hawkins =

American football player (born 1983)

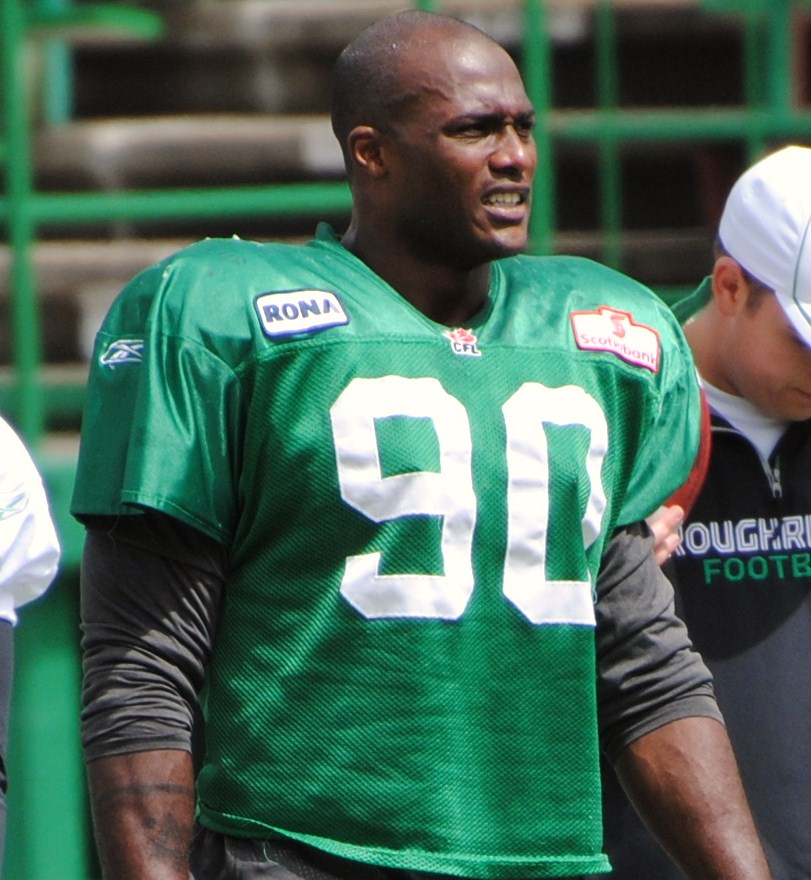
- Hawkins with the Saskatchewan Roughriders in 2010

No. 57, 90
- Position: Defensive end

Personal information
- Born: September 1, 1983 (age 43); Godfrey, Illinois, U.S.
- Listed height: 6 ft 2 in (1.88 m)
- Listed weight: 250 lb (113 kg)

Career information
- High school: Jersey Community (Jerseyville, Illinois)
- College: Illinois State
- NFL draft: 2006: 5th round, 160th overall pick

Career history
- Jacksonville Jaguars (2006–2008); Saskatchewan Roughriders (2010–2013)

Career NFL statistics
- Total tackles: 23
- Sacks: 5.5
- Fumble recoveries: 1
- Stats at Pro Football Reference
- Stats at CFL.ca (archive)

Brent Lee Hawkins (born September 1, 1983) is an American former professional football player who was a defensive end for two years in the National Football League (NFL) and two years in the Canadian Football League (CFL), until retiring from football in May 2013. He was selected by the Jacksonville Jaguars in the fifth round of the 2006 NFL draft. He played college football for the Illinois State Redbirds. He was also a member of the Saskatchewan Roughriders.

== Early life ==
Originally from Godfrey, Illinois, Hawkins graduated from Jersey Community High School in 2001 where he excelled at basketball, football, and track. Hawkins played quarterback, wide receiver and defensive end positions. He recorded career totals of 159 tackles, three sacks, 12 passes defensed, two interceptions and two fumble recoveries. Hawkins was selected as first-team all-state and all-conference as a senior, and was named the Metro-East Area Player of the Year by the St. Louis Post-Dispatch in 2000.

== College career ==
Hawkins began his college career at Purdue University on a football scholarship before transferring and playing his final two seasons at Illinois State University. He was runner-up for the Buck Buchanan Award, presented annually to the top defensive player in I-AA football. Hawkins ranked second in the nation with 17 sacks as a senior, setting school and Gateway Conference records. He was also the MVP for the 2006 Hula Bowl.

== Professional career ==
Pre-draft measurables
Height	Weight
6 ft 2 1/4 in (1.89 m)	244 lb (111 kg)

=== Jacksonville Jaguars ===
In the 2006 NFL season, Hawkins played in six games and had two sacks before he was placed on injured reserve with a season-ending groin injury. During that period, Hawkins became first Jaguars rookie to have a sack in back-to-back games since 2002.

In the 2007 NFL season, Hawkins saw action at both defensive end and on special teams. He finished the season with 14 tackles (12 solo), a career-high 3.5 sack, one fumble recovery and 14 QB pressures. His 3.5 sacks ranked third on team and helped the team to rank tied for fourth in the AFC with 37 sacks. In addition, he added nine special teams tackles.

The Jaguars released Hawkins on September 2, 2008.

=== Saskatchewan Roughriders ===
Hawkins was signed as a free agent by the Saskatchewan Roughriders of the Canadian Football League in April 2010. In his first season in the CFL Hawkins recorded 31 tackles and 3 sacks. Unfortunately, he suffered a right shoulder injury prior to the start of the 2011 CFL season which caused him to miss the entire season. On January 12, 2012, the Saskatchewan Roughriders announced that they had resigned Brent Hawkins. Hawkins played in 14 of the 18 regular season games during the 2012 CFL season. He was credited with 24 tackles, 4 sacks and 2 fumble recoveries. Entering the 2013 training camp Hawkins was still recovering from some scar tissue which had developed in his left shoulder following surgery. On May 15, 2013, the Roughriders announced that Hawkins was retiring from the CFL.

Brent Hawkins finished his CFL career with 27 games played, 55 tackles, 2 special teams tackles, 7 sacks, 4 fumble recoveries, and 1 defensive touchdown.
