= South Central Illinois =

Coordinates: 39°0′N 88°45′W

South Central Illinois is a region in the southern part of Illinois; its approximate boundaries are US 50 in the south, and Illinois Highway 16 in the north. With fertile soil throughout the region, agriculture is a chief industry here. Some of the largest communities in south-central Illinois are Alton, Collinsville, Edwardsville, and Effingham. There is also a South Central Conference (Illinois) of the Illinois High School Association, which includes the schools of Carlinville, East Alton-Wood River, Gillespie, Marquette (Alton), Roxana, Southwestern (Piasa), Greenville, Hillsboro, Litchfield, Pana, Staunton, and Vandalia.

== See also ==
- Central Illinois
