= Highland Community Unit School District 5 =

School district in Madison, Illinois, United States

Highland Community Unit School District 5 is a school district based in Highland, Illinois, and it has 6 schools. The Superintendent of the school district is Michael Sutton.

== Current schools ==
- Alhambra Primary
- Grantfork Upper Elementary
- Highland Primary
- Highland Elementary
- Highland Middle School
- Highland High School
