= Gary Lane (gridiron football) =

American gridiron football player (1942–2003)

No. 15, 14
- Position: Quarterback

Personal information
- Born: December 21, 1942; Alton, Illinois, U.S.
- Died: June 27, 2003 (aged 60); St. Louis, Missouri, U.S.
- Listed height: 6 ft 1 in (1.85 m)
- Listed weight: 210 lb (95 kg)

Career information
- High school: East Alton-Wood River (Wood River, Illinois)
- College: Missouri (1962-1965)
- NFL draft: 1965: 9th round, 125th overall pick
- AFL draft: 1965: Red Shirt 2nd round, 16th overall pick

Career history
- Cleveland Browns (1966–1967); New York Giants (1968); New Orleans Saints (1969)*; Washington Redskins (1969)*; Los Angeles Rams (1969); Saskatchewan Roughriders (1970); Green Bay Packers (1971)*
- * Offseason or practice squad member only

Awards and highlights
- 3× First-team All-Big Eight (1963, 1964, 1965)

Career NFL statistics
- Passing attempts: 43
- Passing completions: 21
- Completion percentage: 48.8%
- TD–INT: 2–1
- Passing yards: 254
- Passer rating: 73.2
- Stats at Pro Football Reference

Gary Owen Lane (December 21, 1942 – June 27, 2003) was an American gridiron football quarterback and referee.

== Biography ==
After graduating from East Alton–Wood River High School in Wood River, Illinois, in 1961, Lane played college football at the University of Missouri from 1963 to 1966. He then played in the National Football League (NFL) for three seasons with the Cleveland Browns and the New York Giants, from 1966 to 1968. He also played one season in the Canadian Football League (CFL) for the Saskatchewan Roughriders in 1970.

Following his playing career, Lane was an official in the NFL for 18 seasons from 1982 to 1999, serving as a side judge (1982–1991, 1998–1999) and referee (1992–1997). Lane was promoted to referee after Tom Dooley retired. He retired prior to the start of the 2000 NFL season, after failing a physical. As an official, Lane was assigned to Super Bowl XXIII in 1989 and Super Bowl XXXIII in 1999 (both in Miami Gardens, Florida) and wore the uniform number 120. He was the side judge for the "Snowplow Game" in 1982 and was the referee of the "Clock Play" game in 1994.

Lane died unexpectedly in 2003 due to a heart attack.

=== Personal life ===
During the last three years of his life, Gary returned to his alma mater of East Alton–Wood River High School and donated many hours as an assistant football coach; contributed his own funds to a scholarship program in his name; and served as a mentor for many of the football players during those years.

The Gary Lane Foundation, a youth program, has been established in his honor. Lane had two daughters. His son-in-law is Mike Matheny, a former player and manager in Major League Baseball (MLB).
