= Triad Community Unit School District 2 =

School district in Illinois, United States

Triad Community Unit School District #2

Location
- Troy, Illinois; United States
- Coordinates: 38°43′54″N 89°52′50″W

District information
- Type: Public
- Grades: PreK-12
- Established: 1954; 72 years ago
- Superintendent: Dr. Jason Henderson

Students and staff
- Students: 3,800
- Faculty: 250
- District mascot: Knight
- Colors: Red, white and black

Other information
- Website: www.triadunit2.org

== Schools ==
- Triad High School
- Triad Middle School
- St. Jacob Elementary
- Marine Elementary
- Henning Elementary
- Silver Creek Elementary

== History ==
The Triad District was formed by consolidation in 1954. The district consists of the communities of Troy, St. Jacob, and Marine, which are all located in Madison County. The district has an area of 121.5 square miles (315 km^{2}). Triad is in Madison County which is in the southwestern sector of Illinois - just 18 miles northeast of St. Louis. The biggest part of the district sits at the crossroads of Interstates 55, 70, and 270. When the district was formed, a contest was held for naming the district. Vincent Kauhl, a student at the McCray Dewey High School in Troy, was the winner with his entry of "TRIAD" for the district name.

When the district was formed, there were 869 students in the three communities which included 222 high school students (grades 9 through 12) and 647 elementary students (grades 1 through 8). There was one grade school in each of the communities and high school buildings in Troy and St. Jacob.

In the fall of 1956, one-half day kindergarten began at the Marine Grade School. Kindergarten students from Troy and St. Jacob could attend school at Marine if so desired. In the fall of 1959 all high school students began attending the new Triad High School. With the addition of the new high school, classroom space became available in Troy and St. Jacob allowing kindergarten to be added in those communities. All kindergarten classes were one-half day every day until the fall of 1974 when kindergarten students began attending school on an all-day, every other day basis. Kindergarten classes were increased to all day every day beginning with the 1999–2000 school year.

The Triad Middle School was established beginning with the 1992–93 school year at the Molden Building in Troy. Until the fall of 1999, district students in grades seven and eight had the option of attending the middle school or attending a traditional junior high concept at St. Jacob or Marine. Beginning with the 1999–2000 school year, a district-wide middle school (Grades 6–8) was established and housed at the former Triad High School.

In November 1997, the district passed a bond issue to build a new high school. The new high school was opened with the beginning of the 1999–2000 school year.

Presently there are 3,635 students attending school in the Triad District from grades pre-kindergarten through grade 12 (1,458 elementary students, 876 middle school students, and 1,301 high school students). There are four elementary schools (grades K-1 at Henning School/grade 2, Pre-K, and Early Childhood at W.S. Freeman and Freeman Annex/grades 3 and 4 at Molden School and grade 5 at McCray-Dewey School); one elementary school in St. Jacob (grades K-5); one elementary school in Marine (grades K-5), along with a district middle school and a district high school
