= Bunker Hill, Illinois =

City in the United States

- City
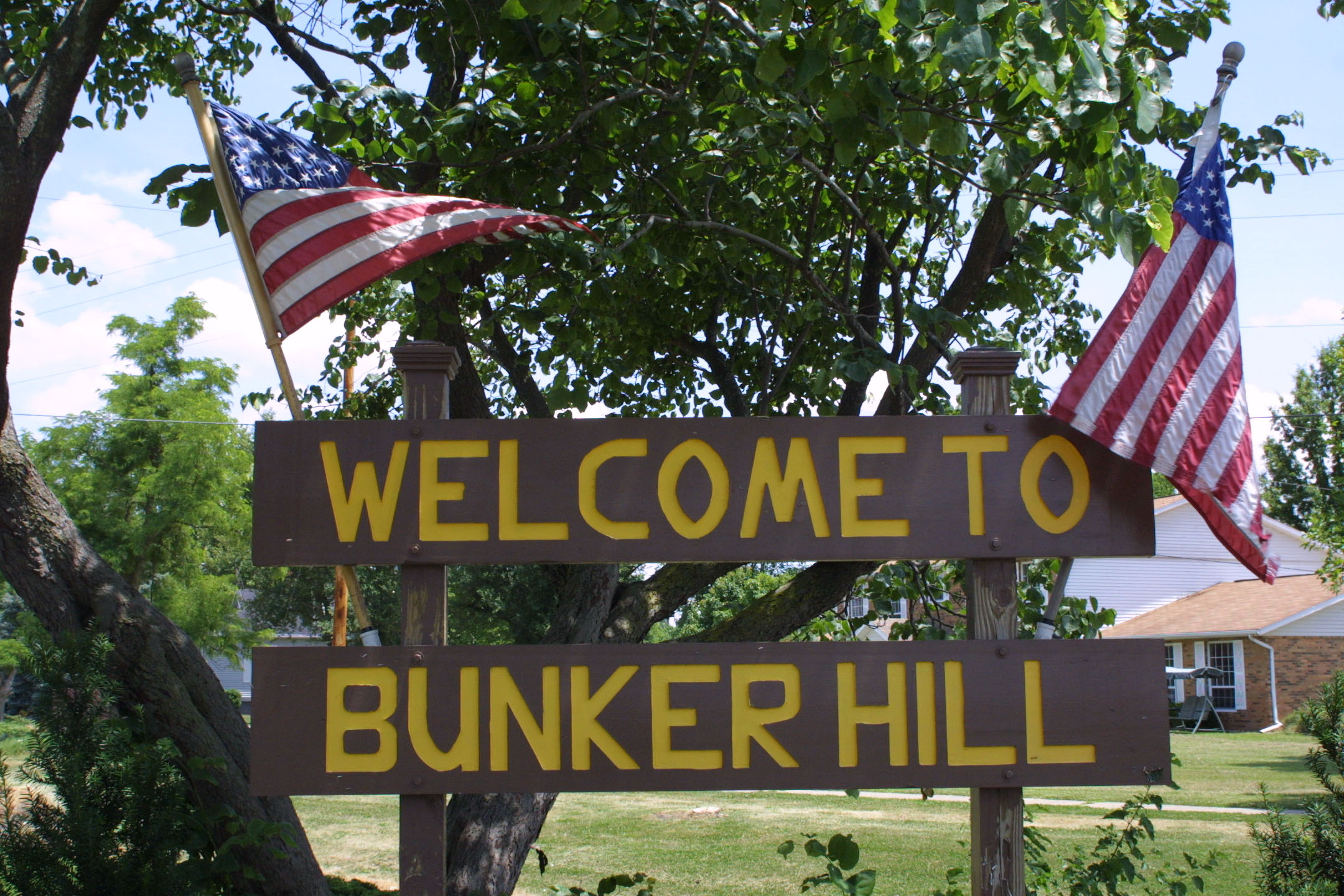
- Welcome sign

- Location in Macoupin County, Illinois
- Coordinates: 39°02′29″N 89°57′04″W
- Country: United States
- State: Illinois
- County: Macoupin
- Township: Bunker Hill
- Named for: Battle of Bunker Hill

Area
  - Total: 1.31 sq mi (3.38 km^{2})
  - Land: 1.28 sq mi (3.32 km^{2})
  - Water: 0.027 sq mi (0.07 km^{2})
- Elevation: 656 ft (200 m)

Population (2020)
  - Total: 1,630
  - Density: 1,272.0/sq mi (491.12/km^{2})
- Time zone: UTC-6 (CST)
  - Summer (DST): UTC-5 (CDT)
- ZIP code: 62014
- Area code: 618
- FIPS code: 17-09577
- GNIS feature ID: 2393463
- Website: www.cityofbunkerhillil.org

Bunker Hill is a city in Macoupin County, Illinois, United States. The population was 1,630 at the 2020 census, down from 1,774 in 2010.

== History ==
=== Settlement ===
The original inhabitants of the Bunker Hill area were the Peoria people, Kickapoo people, and Winnebago people. They were forcibly removed from the area by the United States government around 1830.

As Euro-Americans arrived in Macoupin County, the site of the future Bunker Hill was settled in 1830. At that time, the area was known as "Wolf Ridge", due to the presence of wolves in the vicinity. The first settler was Elijah Lincoln in 1830, who established a land claim one and a half miles southwest of present Bunker Hill. Shortly after he made his claim, Lincoln and a Mr. Tuttle laid out a town, named "Lincoln" after the first settler. The earliest post office in the area was established in 1833 a mile south of Lincoln. A school house was built around 1831, and was also used as the meeting hall for the Baptist denomination. The first church in the area was built by the Baptists. The second was the Congregational church in nearby Woodburn.

In 1834, County Surveyor Luke Knowlton entered 80 acres (320,000 m^{2}) of land that now cover the center of Bunker Hill. On December 25, 1835, Moses True of Salisbury, New Hampshire, John Tilden of Boston, Massachusetts, and Robert Smith of Alton, Illinois, visited Lincoln and formed a company to plat a town and improve the surrounding countryside. By 1836, the settlement of Lincoln had been abandoned, prompting Moses and company to establish a new town, which became Bunker Hill in 1837.

=== The tornado of 1948 ===
View of the downtown business district after the tornado

View of Meissner School, one of few surviving buildings

At 6:45am CST on March 19, 1948, a tornado that originated in Alton, Illinois, blew through Bunker Hill, destroying the majority of the town's buildings and killing 19 people. Although the tornado was only in town for less than a minute, the destruction was devastating. The downtown business district lost many of its buildings. The streets were impassable due to rubble from the storm. The newly renovated Meissner School was one of few buildings virtually undamaged by the tornado. A first aid station was set up in the school, with a temporary morgue in another classroom. By 9:00 am, ambulances from Alton, Carlinville, Litchfield, and Gillespie arrived to transport the injured to local hospitals. By the end of the day, National Guard units, US Army units, the Red Cross, Salvation Army, American Legion, VFW, and Illinois State Police had arrived to restore order and provide assistance to the citizens of Bunker Hill.

The Army and National Guard established patrols to minimize looting, and the State Police set up road blocks to keep sightseers away. The Red Cross, Salvation Army, and Lebanon American Legion opened food stations to feed the volunteers and homeless citizens of the town. Bahn's Grocery Store donated their entire stock for the food stations. A temporary post office was opened in the lobby of the First National Bank. Local farmers brought their tractors and bulldozers to town to clear rubble and reopen the streets.

By evening, the Red Cross had pitched tents in front of Meissner School to house the newly homeless citizens. 126 people were injured and 19 killed by the tornado. Property damage was estimated between four and five million dollars. All five churches in Bunker Hill were destroyed by the tornado, prompting two local ministers, Rev. Burke of the First Congregational Church and Rev. Johnson of the Baptist Church, to conduct the Easter Sunday services on March 28, 1948, using a bulldozer as a pulpit. An estimated 500 residents and volunteers gathered at the center of town for the sermons before returning to work.

A brick pavilion stood in the middle of the intersection of Washington and Warren Streets prior to the tornado. The pavilion, which had been used as a bandstand for community events, was not rebuilt after the tornado, instead being replaced by a flagpole and memorial to local military veterans.

=== Bunker Hill Military Academy ===
Bunker Hill was the home of the Bunker Hill Military Academy toward the end of the 19th and beginning of the 20th centuries. The school opened in 1859 as the Bunker Hill Academy, but closed during the Civil War. From 1862 until 1869, the building housed Bunker Hill's public school. In 1883, the military academy was established in the aging building, offering strict instruction to local children as well as the cadets. The academy remained open until 1914. After the 1948 tornado, the grounds were donated to the American Legion, which built a local post and park on the site.

== Geography ==
Bunker Hill is located in southern Macoupin County in the eastern part of Bunker Hill Township. Carlinville, the Macoupin county seat, is 19 miles (31 km) to the north, Alton on the Mississippi River is 20 miles (32 km) to the southwest, and downtown St. Louis is 37 miles (60 km) to the south-southwest.

According to the U.S. Census Bureau, Bunker Hill has a total area of 1.31 square miles (3.39 km^{2}), of which 1.28 square miles (3.32 km^{2}) are land and 0.025 square miles (0.06 km^{2}), or 1.91%, are water. The city sits on a ridge that drains east to Paddock Creek and west to Indian Creek. Both creeks are south-flowing tributaries of Cahokia Creek, which runs to the Mississippi River northeast of St. Louis.

== Transportation ==
Bunker Hill is centered at the intersection of Illinois Route 159, a north–south thoroughfare running from Illinois Route 16 in the north to Red Bud in the south, and the Bunker Hill Blacktop, running west to Brighton as the Brighton-Bunker Hill Road and east to Staunton and Illinois Route 4 as the Staunton-Bunker Hill Road. The nearest airport is the St. Louis Regional Airport, 15 miles (24 km) southwest of Bunker Hill in Bethalto.

== Lincoln statue ==
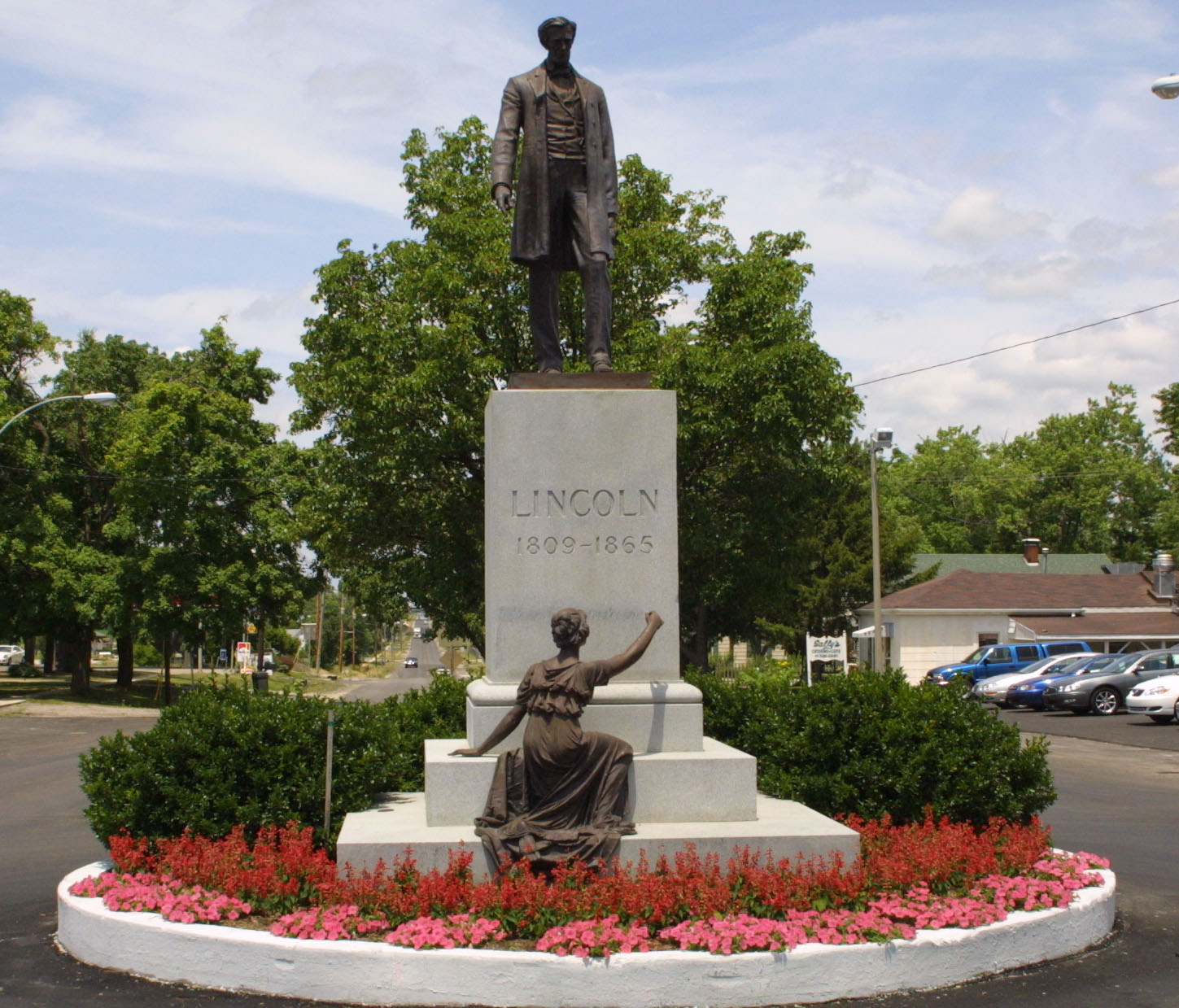
The Lincoln statue in Bunker Hill

Captain Charles Clinton

Bunker Hill is the home of one of four statues of Abraham Lincoln sculpted by William Grandville Hastings. In 1904, Captain Charles Clinton, formerly of Company B of the First Missouri Voluntary Cavalry, donated the statue to the citizens of Bunker Hill in commemoration of the service of local veterans in Company B during the Civil War. The cost of the granite base was raised through voluntary subscription, and the bronze casting of Lincoln was shipped from Philadelphia.

On September 7, 1904, the statue was unveiled by Miss Mary True, daughter of the town's founder. An estimated 7,000 attended the dedication of the statue following a parade through the center of town. Illinois Governor Richard Yates Jr. and Senator Shelby M. Collum were present to witness the ceremonies. Also present were local veterans of Company B John Dennison (Carlinville), James G. Rumbolz (Bunker Hill), Fred Dabel (Bunker Hill), Herman Heuer (Dorsey), James Lawrence (Carlinville), James Pocklington (Carlinville), John Brandenburger (Bunker Hill), E.S. Williams (Bunker Hill), and August Kardel (Upper Alton). Captain Clinton was also present for the dedication.

A plaque mounted on the statue's base reads:

1904– In Ever Lasting Memory of The Conflict By Which The Union In Which They Took Part This Statue of Abraham Lincoln Was Presented To the Citizens of Bunker Hill By the Soldiers of Company B of the First Missouri Cavalry, Charles Clinton

The statue also includes Lady Liberty kneeling at the base, etching the words "with malice toward none."

The Lincoln statue rests in the middle of the intersection of North Washington (IL Route 159) and Fayette streets.

== Other attractions ==
The Bunker Hill City Cemetery, located in the 600 block of East Warren Street, is home to the Soldiers Monument honoring those who fought and died for freedom and liberty. The monument was erected in 1866. It was damaged during the 1948 tornado, but in 1951 three World War II veterans teamed up to repair it. A special re-dedication ceremony was held on September 17, 2016, as part of the 2016 Fall Fest sponsored by the Bunker Hill Chamber of Commerce.

The Bunker Hill Historical Museum, operated by the Bunker Hill Historical Society, is located at 114 East Warren Street in the building which was once home to the Bunker Hill Public Library and then later Bunker Hill City Hall. The museum features exhibits on local history, including information on the area churches, area cemeteries, area schools including the former Bunker Hill Military Academy, the 1948 tornado, and an early 20th-century doctor's office. The museum is open every Tuesday and Saturday morning from 10:00am CST until 12:00pm CST and also by appointment.

Brittany Shooting Park is located north-northeast of town on East Prairie Dell Road, about 4 miles (6 km) north of Bunker Hill off IL 159. The Shooting Park hosts several Illinois State trap meets every year, and offers daily shooting as well as programs for children wanting to learn the sport.

== Education ==
Bunker Hill is served by Bunker Hill CUSD#8 and has 1 high school, Bunker Hill High School.

== Demographics ==
Historical population
Census	Pop.	Note	%±
1880	1,441		—
1890	1,269		−11.9%
1900	1,279		0.8%
1910	1,046		−18.2%
1920	977		−6.6%
1930	947		−3.1%
1940	1,082		14.3%
1950	1,238		14.4%
1960	1,524		23.1%
1970	1,465		−3.9%
1980	1,700		16.0%
1990	1,722		1.3%
2000	1,801		4.6%
2010	1,774		−1.5%
2020	1,630		−8.1%
U.S. Decennial Census

=== 2020 census ===
As of the 2020 census, Bunker Hill had a population of 1,630. The median age was 41.5 years. 22.9% of residents were under the age of 18 and 19.8% of residents were 65 years of age or older. For every 100 females there were 101.5 males, and for every 100 females age 18 and over there were 92.3 males age 18 and over.

0.0% of residents lived in urban areas, while 100.0% lived in rural areas.

There were 677 households in Bunker Hill, of which 30.1% had children under the age of 18 living in them. Of all households, 42.2% were married-couple households, 19.9% were households with a male householder and no spouse or partner present, and 32.2% were households with a female householder and no spouse or partner present. About 33.1% of all households were made up of individuals and 14.6% had someone living alone who was 65 years of age or older.

There were 738 housing units, of which 8.3% were vacant. The homeowner vacancy rate was 3.3% and the rental vacancy rate was 4.1%.

Racial composition as of the 2020 census
Race	Number	Percent
White	1,462	89.7%
Black or African American	19	1.2%
American Indian and Alaska Native	5	0.3%
Asian	12	0.7%
Native Hawaiian and Other Pacific Islander	0	0.0%
Some other race	7	0.4%
Two or more races	125	7.7%
Hispanic or Latino (of any race)	43	2.6%

=== 2000 census ===
As of the 2000 census, there were 1,801 people, 697 households, and 496 families residing in the city. The population density was 1,526.9 inhabitants per square mile (589.5/km^{2}). There were 742 housing units at an average density of 629.1 per square mile (242.9/km^{2}). The racial makeup of the city was 97.50% White, 1.22% African American, 0.11% Asian, 0.28% from other races, and 0.89% from two or more races. Hispanic or Latino of any race were 0.72% of the population.

There were 697 households, out of which 35.6% had children under the age of 18 living with them, 55.8% were married couples living together, 12.1% had a female householder with no husband present, and 28.8% were non-families. 26.1% of all households were made up of individuals, and 14.1% had someone living alone who was 65 years of age or older. The average household size was 2.52 and the average family size was 3.02.

In the city, the population was spread out, with 26.0% under the age of 18, 8.4% from 18 to 24, 28.7% from 25 to 44, 20.4% from 45 to 64, and 16.4% who were 65 years of age or older. The median age was 37 years. For every 100 females, there were 88.8 males. For every 100 females age 18 and over, there were 87.6 males.

The median income for a household in the city was $37,156, and the median income for a family was $45,885. Males had a median income of $35,227 versus $23,000 for females. The per capita income for the city was $16,798. About 8.8% of families and 10.3% of the population were below the poverty line, including 14.3% of those under age 18 and 4.6% of those age 65 or over.
