= Highland High School (Illinois) =

American high school in southern Illinois

Coordinates: 38.755875°N 89.673917°W

Location
- 12760 Troxler Avenue; Highland, Illinois; United States

Information
- Type: Public high school
- Established: 1893; 133 years ago
- School district: Highland Community Unit School District 5
- NCES School ID: 171899002179
- Principal: Caleb Houchins
- Teaching staff: 54.00 (FTE)
- Grades: 9–12
- Enrollment: 847 (2023–24)
- Student to teacher ratio: 15.69
- Colors: Red and black
- Athletics conference: Mississippi Valley Conferencec
- Nickname: Bulldogs
- Rival: Triad High School
- Yearbook: Iris
- Website: highlandcusd5.org

Highland High School is a public high school located in Highland, Illinois. HHS is in the southeast corner of Madison County and is part of Highland Community Unit School District 5.

== History ==
When the Swiss-German town of Highland was founded in the early 1800s, one of its early founders, Soloman Koepfli, had dreamed of Highland having a high school for the town's youth.

The Highland High School was established in 1893, starting with a three-year course of study. The first graduating class was that of 1896, with nine members. The first four-year course graduates would not graduate until 1910.

In 1913, with assistance of a grant, a piece of land located on Lindenthal and Poplar (now 1600 Lindenthal) was purchased from Louis Miller. On February 24, 1934, Palmer L. Ewing, Superintendent of Schools, held a groundbreaking ceremony to begin construction. The school was officially moved from the square to its home on Lindethal on September 16, 1935.

The 1600 block of Lindenthal Avenue housed Highland High School classes beginning in the fall of 1935. The building was built in part to the National Recovery Act and need for a new public school. The building features a central unit gymnasium with high school classes on the left and grade school on the right. The gymnasium was not only used for athletics, but for community events.

In 1974 it was determined that the Lindenthal campus was no longer a viable location for HHS and the Capitol Development Board offered a grant to the Highland Community School District. On June 1, voters passed a bond issue accepting the grant. Highland High School would begin classes on Troxler Avenue starting in the fall of 1976.

== Athletics ==
Highland High School compete in the Mississippi Valley Conference under the Illinois High School Association. They will begin competing in the South 7 conference in the 2026-27 school year. The school currently offers 24 sports.

== Notable alumni ==
- Jake Odorizzi (2008), baseball player
- Geoff Hartlieb (2012), baseball player
- Sam LaPorta (2019), football player
