= Lebanon High School (Illinois) =

American high school in southern Illinois

Coordinates: 38°36′03″N 89°48′37″W

Location
- 200 West Schuetz Street; Lebanon, Illinois 62254; United States

Information
- Type: Public high school
- School district: Lebanon Community Unit 9
- Superintendent: Matt Noyes
- Principal: Kim Emrick
- Teaching staff: 25.40 (on an FTE basis)
- Grades: 6–12
- Student to teacher ratio: 9.29
- Colors: Purple and white
- Athletics conference: Cahokia Conference
- Nickname: Greyhounds
- Website: lcusd9.org/o/lhs

Lebanon High School is the public high school of Lebanon Community Unit School District 9 in Lebanon, Illinois.

== Athletics ==
Lebanon competes in the Cahokia Conference, and is a member of the Illinois High School Association (IHSA), the organization which governs most sports and competitive activities. Teams are stylized as the greyhounds.

The following teams placed in the top four of their respective IHSA sponsored state championship tournaments:

- Cross Country: 4th place (1977–78); State Champions (1976–77)
- Softball: 2nd place (2009–10); 4th place (2007–08); 2nd place (1996–97)
- Track & Field (boys): 4th place (1971–72, 1975–76); 2nd place (1976–77)
- Baseball: 3rd place (2009–10)
- Girls Basketball: 3rd place (2017–2018)

== Notable alumni ==
- Mark Consuelos
- Neal Cotts
- Craig Virgin
