= New Athens High School =

American high school in southern Illinois

Location
- 501 Hanft Street; New Athens, Illinois 62264; United States; 38.3186°N 89.8678°W

Information
- Type: Public high school
- School district: New Athens School District #60
- Principal: Dan Lehman
- Staff: 13.30 (FTE)
- Grades: 9–12
- Enrollment: 161 (2023–24)
- Student to teacher ratio: 12.11
- Colors: Purple and gold
- Athletics conference: Cahokia Conference
- Nickname: Yellow Jackets
- Website: na60.org/o/hs

New Athens High School is a public high school located in New Athens, Illinois.

== Athletics ==
New Athens High School athletics teams compete in the Cahokia Conference in the Kaskaskia Division. Their school colors are gold and purple and their mascot is the yellow jacket. They offer baseball, softball, boys & girls basketball, volleyball, cross country, boys & girls golf, and track & field.

=== State championships ===
- Baseball
  - 1979 Illinois High School Association State Champions

== Demographics ==
As of the 2018–19 school year, New Athens High School enrolled 149 students. Of these, 142 identified as white, four identified as black, and one identified as multi-racial.

== Notable alumni ==
- Whitey Herzog, former Major League Baseball player and manager
