= Roxana High School =

American high school in southern Illinois

Location
- 401 Chaffer Avenue; Roxana, Illinois 62084; United States; 38.8513°N 90.076°W

Information
- Type: Public high school
- Founded: 1941; 85 years ago
- School district: Roxana Community Unit School District #1
- Superintendent: Debra Krueztzrager
- CEEB code: 143765
- Principal: Jason Dandurand
- Teaching staff: 34.27 (FTE)
- Grades: 9–12
- Enrollment: 501 (2023–24)
- Average class size: 18.4
- Student to teacher ratio: 14.62
- Campus type: Suburban/Urban rural fringe
- Colors: Scarlet, gold, and blue
- Fight song: "Youth of America March" by Dr. Paul V. Yoder
- Athletics: Illinois High School Association
- Athletics conference: South Central Conference
- Nickname: Shells
- Rivals: East Alton–Wood River; Civic Memorial
- Newspaper: The Roxette
- Yearbook: The Rox
- Website: roxanaschools.org

Roxana High School is a secondary school in Roxana, Illinois, United States. The school's mascot is the St James shell, logo of the former Shell Oil (now ConocoPhillips) refinery also located in the town. The school district encompasses all of Roxana, South Roxana, and parts of Wood River, Edwardsville and Rosewood Heights.

== History ==
=== 1802–1989 ===
The area around Roxana began offering education in 1802 with the construction of Gilham's Pasture School on the southeast corner of what is now 13th Street and Edwardsville Road in Wood River, across from the current site of a Dairy Queen. Other general schools opened and closed throughout the late nineteenth century and early twentieth century; these include Brushy Grove School (not to be confused with its later incarnation, Brushey Grove School) from 1858 to 1874 (burned down), rebuilt and used until 1929, Brushey Grove School (new brick building on the same location) from 1929 to 1969, Roxana School from 1918 to 1926, Edison School from 1926 to 1963, and Burbank School starting in 1936. Burbank was built as a WPA project, and was named after botanist Luther Burbank.

The school district did not have a secondary school at that time; Roxana students went to other districts for their education instead, primarily Wood River High School, which had opened in 1925. In 1939, citizens of Roxana and part of neighboring Wood River voted to form a new school district; the high school itself was built in 1941 and has been added to throughout its tenure.

The original building had three stories, comprising twelve classrooms, a main office, a library, and a gymnasium. A larger gym was added in 1954.

Wanda-South Roxana School District was numbered 105 This district included Wanda School built in 1923 and the old South Roxana School built in 1927. In 1950, this school district merged with Burbank-Edison-Brushey Grove Schools District 103 and the High School District 156 to form Roxana Community Unit School District No. 1. In 1954, a second larger gymnasium at the high school and new elementary schools at Rosewood, Central, South Roxana, and the Junior High School opened. Wanda School and the old South Roxana School closed once the new South Roxana School opened. Wanda School was used as storage for many years. The old South Roxana School building was sold and acquired by an interstate trucking firm for use as offices.

Throughout the 1960s and 1970s, the district included four elementary schools: Central, Rosewood Heights, Burbank and South Roxana. Roxana Junior High School was built adjacent to the high school; today, they are one contiguous building. Central, Rosewood, South Roxana, and the Junior High buildings were all constructed simultaneously with the 1954 erection of the large gymnasium at the high school.

Brushey Grove School was sold at public auction in 1971. A US Bank now stands on the spot previously occupied by Brushey Grove School, and a commemorative marker in its parking lot notes the existence of the old school.

Roxana School was located on Old Edwardsville Road in Roxana, between Walnut and Tydeman, facing the Standard Oil Refinery fence. After its demolition before 1970 the land was sold to a trucking company.

Edison School was located at the northwest corner of Tydeman and Central Avenue in Roxana, directly across the street from the First Baptist Church of Roxana. After Edison's demolition in the late 1960s, Roxana Public Library was built on the site in 1970.

Burbank added an addition in 1966. However, as enrollment began to decline with the passage of the post-war baby boom, schools began closing. Burbank, the oldest of the four, closed in 1983 and was sold. The building was given to the city and razed in 2009.

Rosewood Heights School followed in 1989, and the building has since been razed. Following the closure of these two schools, sixth graders were moved to the junior high building, and the remaining two grade schools (Central School and South Roxana School) now service grades Pre-K through 5.

=== Since 2011 ===
RHS has grown considerably from its beginnings, to comprise over twenty-five full classrooms, two gyms, an auditorium, a cafeteria, a weight room, a baseball field, a football field, an All-weather running track, six tennis courts, a full bus garage, three on-campus parking lots, and entire buildings dedicated to science, family and consumer sciences, technology, and automotive education. A junior high school and the school district's administrative offices adjoin the high school building. In 2011 construction finished on a new, larger cafeteria, track, and parking lot. The cafeteria is a completely new building built near the bus garage on campus. The track was built in place of the former cinder track. The parking lot was created behind the football field's home-team bleachers, adding about 70 new parking spaces for students.

On April 1, 2014, the school went into a major lockdown after a student sent an untrue text saying that shots had been fired.

== Athletics ==
RHS is a part of the Illinois High School Association, participating in 10 out of 14 sports offered for boys and 10 out of 14 sports offered for girls.

== Notable alumni ==
- Harry Gallatin - Basketball player, coach; Basketball Hall of Fame member.
