= New Athens, Illinois =

New Athens
- Village
- Location of New Athens in St. Clair County, Illinois.
- Coordinates: 38°19′05″N 89°52′42″W
- Country: United States
- State: Illinois
- County: St. Clair
- Named for: Athens, Greece

Area
  - Total: 2.30 sq mi (5.95 km^{2})
  - Land: 2.11 sq mi (5.47 km^{2})
  - Water: 0.19 sq mi (0.48 km^{2})
- Elevation: 427 ft (130 m)

Population (2020)
  - Total: 1,955
  - Density: 925.5/sq mi (357.35/km^{2})
- Time zone: UTC-6 (CST)
  - Summer (DST): UTC-5 (CDT)
- ZIP code: 62264
- Area code: 618
- FIPS code: 17-52116
- GNIS feature ID: 2399452
- Website: www.newathensil.com

New Athens (/ˈeɪθənz/) is a village in St. Clair County, Illinois, United States. Based upon common usage, the 'A' is always sounded with a long vowel, rather than a short vowel, by its residents, unlike the most commonly used English pronunciation of the city in Greece.

As of the 2020 census, New Athens had a population of 1,955. New Athens sits on the Kaskaskia River and was originally called Athens. The village was laid out in 1836 and incorporated in 1866. The name change to New Athens came in 1868 after it was discovered there was already an Athens in another part of the state.

New Athens is home to several churches, including St. Agatha Catholic Church, St. John United Church of Christ, St. Paul Lutheran Church, The United Methodist Church of New Athens, and First Baptist Church.

== History ==
The first organized settlement in what would later become the future town of New Athens, Illinois was Manville Ferry named after early settler and ferryman on the Kaskaskia River, Ira Manville. Manville ran the ferry until his death in 1821. By 1818, the third generation of the Sturdivant family counterfeiters, known as the "Sturdivant Gang", were organized by Roswell S. Sturdivant and his brother, Merrick Sturdivant, who led the criminal organization, would base their southwestern Illinois counterfeiting operations at Manville Ferry and the other part of their criminal operation in southeastern Illinois on the Ohio River at Sturdivant's Fort, in Pope County, Illinois, now present-day Rosiclare, Hardin County, Illinois.

== Geography ==
According to the 2010 census, New Athens has a total area of 2.129 square miles (5.51 km^{2}), of which 1.92 square miles (4.97 km^{2}) (or 90.18%) is land and 0.209 square miles (0.54 km^{2}) (or 9.82%) is water.

== Demographics ==
Historical population
Census	Pop.	Note	%±
1880	603		—
1890	624		3.5%
1900	856		37.2%
1910	1,131		32.1%
1920	1,406		24.3%
1930	1,269		−9.7%
1940	1,355		6.8%
1950	1,518		12.0%
1960	1,923		26.7%
1970	2,000		4.0%
1980	1,937		−3.1%
1990	2,010		3.8%
2000	1,981		−1.4%
2010	2,054		3.7%
2020	1,955		−4.8%
U.S. Decennial Census

=== 2020 census ===
As of the 2020 census, New Athens had a population of 1,955. The median age was 42.7 years. 21.6% of residents were under the age of 18 and 19.9% of residents were 65 years of age or older. For every 100 females there were 90.5 males, and for every 100 females age 18 and over there were 88.3 males age 18 and over.

0.0% of residents lived in urban areas, while 100.0% lived in rural areas.

There were 797 households in New Athens, of which 28.9% had children under the age of 18 living in them. Of all households, 51.7% were married-couple households, 14.9% were households with a male householder and no spouse or partner present, and 24.3% were households with a female householder and no spouse or partner present. About 26.1% of all households were made up of individuals and 12.2% had someone living alone who was 65 years of age or older.

There were 869 housing units, of which 8.3% were vacant. The homeowner vacancy rate was 3.0% and the rental vacancy rate was 8.2%.

Racial composition as of the 2020 census
Race	Number	Percent
White	1,814	92.8%
Black or African American	13	0.7%
American Indian and Alaska Native	1	0.1%
Asian	3	0.2%
Native Hawaiian and Other Pacific Islander	1	0.1%
Some other race	19	1.0%
Two or more races	104	5.3%
Hispanic or Latino (of any race)	47	2.4%

=== 2000 census ===
As of the census of 2000, there were 1,981 people, 774 households, and 541 families residing in the village. The population density was 1,148.3 inhabitants per square mile (443.4/km^{2}). There were 819 housing units at an average density of 474.7 per square mile (183.3/km^{2}). The racial makeup of the village was 97.98% White, 0.76% African American, 0.15% Native American, 0.35% Asian, 0.15% Pacific Islander, and 0.61% from two or more races. Hispanic or Latino of any race were 0.56% of the population.

There were 774 households, out of which 33.6% had children under the age of 18 living with them, 55.7% were married couples living together, 10.3% had a female householder with no husband present, and 30.1% were non-families. 26.0% of all households were made up of individuals, and 15.1% had someone living alone who was 65 years of age or older. The average household size was 2.49 and the average family size was 3.00.

In the village, the population was spread out, with 23.9% under the age of 18, 9.3% from 18 to 24, 28.9% from 25 to 44, 20.7% from 45 to 64, and 17.2% who were 65 years of age or older. The median age was 38 years. For every 100 females, there were 88.3 males. For every 100 females age 18 and over, there were 83.5 males.

The median income for a household in the village was $39,625, and the median income for a family was $49,236. Males had a median income of $36,307 versus $22,462 for females. The per capita income for the village was $17,627. About 6.8% of families and 8.4% of the population were below the poverty line, including 10.0% of those under age 18 and 6.7% of those age 65 or over.

== Education ==
The village of New Athens is the home of New Athens Community Unit School District #60 (NACUSD 60) – New Athens High School Yellow Jackets. The school website provides additional resources and references.

== Notable people ==
- Rich Hacker, coach for the St. Louis Cardinals and Toronto Blue Jays
- Whitey Herzog, MLB Hall of Fame manager for the St. Louis Cardinals and Kansas City Royals
- Sturdivant Gang, 19th Century counterfeiters

== See also ==
- List of municipalities in Illinois
