= Freeburg Community High School =

American high school in southern Illinois

Freeburg High School

Location
- 401 S Monroe Street; Freeburg, Illinois 62243; United States; 38°25′22″N 89°52′45″W

Information
- Type: Public high school
- Established: 1904; 122 years ago
- School district: Freeburg Community High School District #77
- Teaching staff: 44.00 (FTE)
- Grades: 9–12
- Enrollment: 685 (2023–24)
- Student to teacher ratio: 15.57
- Colors: Blue, white, and silver
- Nickname: Midgets
- Website: fchs77.org

Freeburg Community High School (FCHS) is a high school located in Freeburg, Illinois, United States. It is operated by the Freeburg Community High School District #77. The district encompasses approximately 122 square miles (320 km^{2}) and has an average enrollment of 750 students.

== History ==
Freeburg Community High School was founded in 1904 as a two-year school and graduated its first class of four students in 1906. In 1923, after converting to a traditional four-year high school, two students were presented with Freeburg High School diplomas. The existing school was constructed in 1929, becoming "Home of the Freeburg Midgets." The original mascot was named Marty the Midget, a name that lasted through the 1960s. In February 2025, State Rep. Maurice West propose a bill HB3527 that would prohibit the use of "discriminatory disability mascots" in all schools in response to public pressure about the name. The Illinois House of Representatives passed the bill, which would only affect FCHS, in April 2025.

== Notable alumni ==
- C. T. Wilson, member of the Maryland House of Delegates
