= Chester High School (Chester, Illinois) =

School in Chester, Illinois, United States

Location
- 1901 Swanwick Street; Chester, Illinois, (Randolph County) 62233; United States
- Coordinates: 37°55′12″N 89°48′47″W

Information
- School type: Public
- Superintendent: Kimberly Briggs
- School code: 140625
- Principal: Jeremy Blechle
- Teaching staff: 22.60 (FTE)
- Grades: 9-12
- Gender: Coeducational
- Classes: −
- Student to teacher ratio: 14.65
- Hours in school day: 8 am - 3 pm
- Campus: Suborban
- Colour
- Sports: Golf, cross country, football, volleyball, basketball, track, baseball, softball
- Mascot: Yellow Jacket
- Rival: Trico Pioneers
- Newspaper: The Sting
- Yearbook: Summit
- Website: chester139.com

Chester High School is a public high school in Chester, Illinois, United States.

== Athletics ==
- Football - boys (freshman, junior varsity, varsity)
- Volleyball - girls (freshman, junior varsity, varsity)
- Cross country - boys and girls (varsity)
- Golf - boys and girls (varsity)
- Cheerleading - boys and girls (varsity)
- Trapshooting - boys and girls (varsity)
- Baseball - boys (junior varsity, varsity)
- Softball - girls (varsity)
- Track - boys and girls (varsity)
- Basketball - girls (junior varsity, varsity) boys (freshman, junior varsity, varsity)
- Dance - Coed (varsity)
