= Bunker Hill High School (Illinois) =

High school in Illinois, US

Location
- 314 S Meissner Street; Bunker Hill, Illinois 62014; United States; 39.03996°N 89.96093°W

Information
- Type: Comprehensive public high school
- School district: Bunker Hill CUSD 8
- Principal: Matt Smith
- Grades: 8–12
- Enrollment: 208 (2023–24)
- Colors: Red and white
- Nickname: Minutemen
- Website: bhcusd.org/o/bunker-hill

Bunker Hill High School is a public high school located in Bunker Hill, Illinois.

== Student body ==
43% of the student body qualifies for free or reduced lunch. The high school has an enrollment of 213 students. There are 13 students for every 1 teacher. 17% of students scored proficient in math and 32% scored proficient or above in reading.

The demographics of Bunker Hill High School in 2020:

| White | African American | Asian American | Latino | Two or More Races |
|---|---|---|---|---|
| 94% | 1.8% | 0% | 1.4% | 2.7% |

== Athletics ==
BHHS offers a variety of sports to its students. The following is a list of all sports teams at BHHS:

Boys Athletics

- Baseball
- Basketball
- Football
- Soccer
- Wrestling
- Volleyball

Girls Athletics

- Basketball
- Cheer
- Soccer
- Softball
- Tennis
- Volleyball
