= Mascoutah, Illinois =

- City
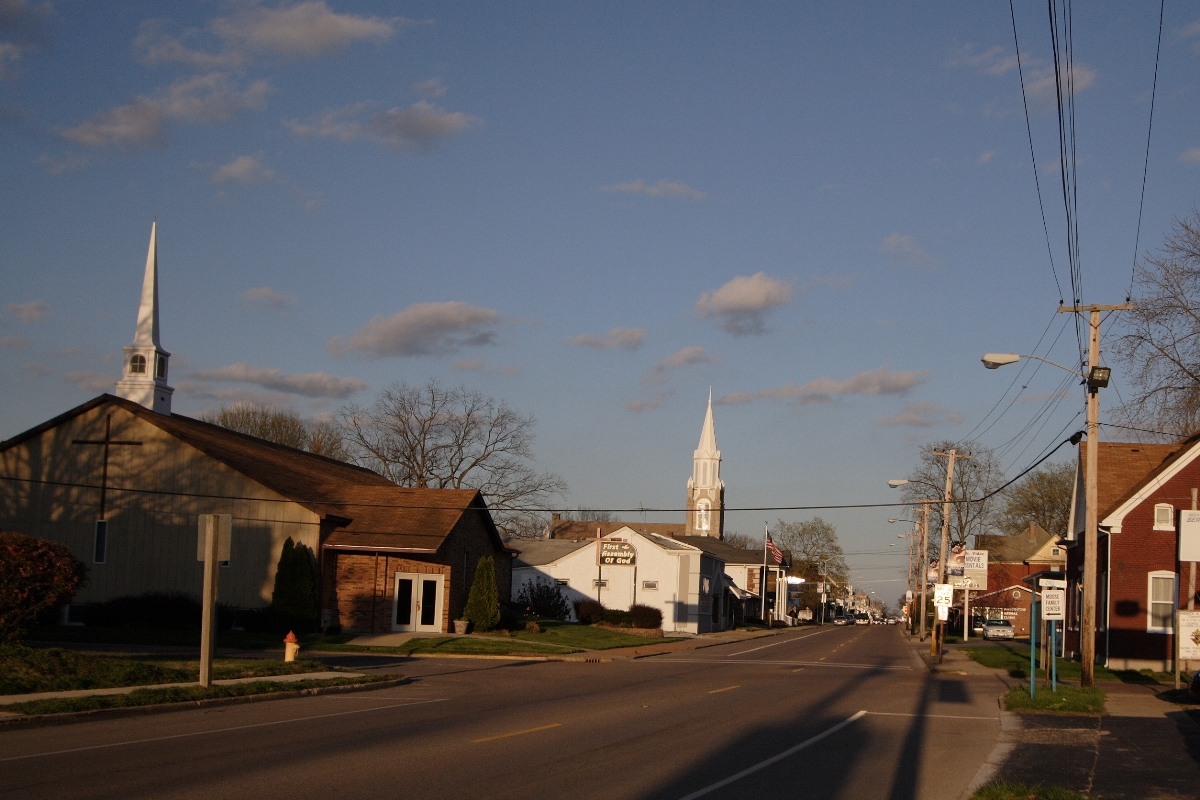
- Main Street, 2006

- Flag Seal

- Location of Mascoutah in St. Clair County, Illinois.
- Coordinates: 38°30′19″N 89°48′21″W
- Country: United States
- State: Illinois
- County: St. Clair

Area
  - Total: 9.73 sq mi (25.19 km^{2})
  - Land: 9.58 sq mi (24.81 km^{2})
  - Water: 0.15 sq mi (0.38 km^{2})
- Elevation: 430 ft (130 m)

Population (2020)
  - Total: 8,754
  - Density: 914/sq mi (352.9/km^{2})
- Time zone: UTC-6 (CST)
  - Summer (DST): UTC-5 (CDT)
- ZIP code: 62258
- Area code: 618
- FIPS code: 17-47423
- GNIS feature ID: 2395038
- Website: www.mascoutah.org

Mascoutah is a city in St. Clair County, Illinois, United States. The population was 8,754 at the 2020 census. It is part of the Metro East region of Greater St. Louis. The city was named for the Mascoutens, a tribe of Algonquian-speaking Native Americans.

== History ==
The town of Mascoutah was originally established in 1837 as Mechanicsburg. This was disputed with the establishment of a Post Office; the inhabitants were informed that another township in Illinois was already named Mechanicsburg. The town was renamed after the Mascouten tribe, and was officially designated Mascoutah in 1839.

Mascoutah was considered a progressive town near the turn of the 20th century. The town saw steady growth thanks to the construction of a train depot in 1870, courtesy of the St. Louis and Southeastern Railway (later the Louisville and Nashville). The largest Turner Hall in Southern Illinois was established in Mascoutah in 1873 which served as the center of town social life, and the town constructed its own citizen owned power plant in 1894. The Mascoutah Herald was established in 1885 and remains in production to this day. In 1903 the Belleville And Mascoutah Electric Railway Company planned an electric rail system to Belleville that was delayed and never completed.

The train depot shut down, the Turner Hall eventually became the chamber of commerce, and the municipal power plant now houses the city's fleet and equipment maintenance department.

== Geography ==
According to the 2010 census, Mascoutah has a total area of 9.65 square miles (24.99 km^{2}), of which 9.5 square miles (24.60 km^{2}) (or 98.45%) is land and 0.15 square miles (0.39 km^{2}) (or 1.55%) is water.

== Demographics ==
Historical population
Census	Pop.	Note	%±
1860	2,076		—
1870	2,790		34.4%
1880	2,558		−8.3%
1890	2,032		−20.6%
1900	2,171		6.8%
1910	2,081		−4.1%
1920	2,343		12.6%
1930	2,311		−1.4%
1940	2,294		−0.7%
1950	3,009		31.2%
1960	3,625		20.5%
1970	5,045		39.2%
1980	4,962		−1.6%
1990	5,511		11.1%
2000	5,659		2.7%
2010	7,483		32.2%
2020	8,754		17.0%
U.S. Decennial Census

Mascoutah was the United States center of population point in 1970.

=== Racial and ethnic composition ===
Mascoutah city, Illinois – Racial and ethnic composition Note: the US Census treats Hispanic/Latino as an ethnic category. This table excludes Latinos from the racial categories and assigns them to a separate category. Hispanics/Latinos may be of any race.
Race / Ethnicity (NH = Non-Hispanic)	Pop 2000	Pop 2010	Pop 2020	% 2000	% 2010	% 2020
White alone (NH)	5,149	6,562	6,979	90.99%	87.69%	79.72%
Black or African American alone (NH)	232	374	532	4.10%	5.00%	6.08%
Native American or Alaska Native alone (NH)	20	21	20	0.35%	0.28%	0.23%
Asian alone (NH)	53	91	142	0.94%	1.22%	1.62%
Native Hawaiian or Pacific Islander alone (NH)	3	26	6	0.05%	0.35%	0.07%
Other race alone (NH)	8	8	59	0.14%	0.11%	0.67%
Mixed race or Multiracial (NH)	95	191	572	1.68%	2.55%	6.53%
Hispanic or Latino (any race)	99	210	444	1.75%	2.81%	5.07%
Total	5,659	7,483	8,754	100.00%	100.00%	100.00%

=== 2020 census ===
As of the 2020 census, Mascoutah had a population of 8,754. The median age was 36.9 years. 27.2% of residents were under the age of 18 and 13.0% of residents were 65 years of age or older. For every 100 females there were 94.5 males, and for every 100 females age 18 and over there were 90.6 males age 18 and over.

97.3% of residents lived in urban areas, while 2.7% lived in rural areas.

There were 3,217 households in Mascoutah, of which 38.3% had children under the age of 18 living in them. Of all households, 55.2% were married-couple households, 15.2% were households with a male householder and no spouse or partner present, and 24.1% were households with a female householder and no spouse or partner present. About 23.7% of all households were made up of individuals and 9.2% had someone living alone who was 65 years of age or older.

There were 3,440 housing units, of which 6.5% were vacant. The homeowner vacancy rate was 0.8% and the rental vacancy rate was 6.4%.

Racial composition as of the 2020 census
Race	Number	Percent
White	7,133	81.5%
Black or African American	539	6.2%
American Indian and Alaska Native	23	0.3%
Asian	150	1.7%
Native Hawaiian and Other Pacific Islander	8	0.1%
Some other race	144	1.6%
Two or more races	757	8.6%

=== 2000 census ===
As of the census of 2000, there were 5,659 people, 2,162 households, and 1,571 families residing in the city. The population density was 655.1 inhabitants per square mile (252.9/km^{2}). There were 2,309 housing units at an average density of 267.3 per square mile (103.2/km^{2}). The racial makeup of the city was 91.73% White, 4.19% African American, 0.35% Native American, 0.97% Asian, 0.05% Pacific Islander, 0.85% from other races, and 1.86% from two or more races. Hispanic or Latino of any race were 1.75% of the population.

There were 2,162 households, out of which 35.8% had children under the age of 18 living with them, 57.5% were married couples living together, 11.2% had a female householder with no husband present, and 27.3% were non-families. 23.7% of all households were made up of individuals, and 10.5% had someone living alone who was 65 years of age or older. The average household size was 2.57 and the average family size was 3.05.

In the city, the population was spread out, with 26.4% under the age of 18, 8.5% from 18 to 24, 29.4% from 25 to 44, 21.5% from 45 to 64, and 14.2% who were 65 years of age or older. The median age was 38 years. For every 100 females, there were 92.4 males. For every 100 females age 18 and over, there were 90.1 males.

The median income for a household in the city was $46,451, and the median income for a family was $55,018. Males had a median income of $37,182 versus $23,156 for females. The per capita income for the city was $21,569. About 6.3% of families and 7.8% of the population were below the poverty line, including 11.8% of those under age 18 and 7.9% of those age 65 or over.

== Parks and recreation ==
There are three parks in town that offer a wide array of activities. Scheve Park has two swimming pools, a splash pad, 7 baseball diamonds (2 with lights), a large dog park, lit sand volleyball court, lit horseshoe pits, two soccer fields, a disc golf course with 18 tee boxes shooting to 9 targets, a skate park, ten pavilions varying in size, and several playground areas. Scheve Park also has a restored train caboose and dining car that visitors can tour. Maple Park is equipped with outdoor basketball facilities, a ball playing area, playground equipment, and a family sized pavilion. Prairie Park has two fishing lakes, 3 lighted colored fountains, picnic tables with grills and a pavilion.

== Education ==
Mascoutah Community Unit School District#19 serves the city. There are five schools in the district: Mascoutah Community High School, Mascoutah Middle School, Mascoutah Elementary School, Scott Air Force Base Elementary School, and Wingate Elementary School.

Holy Childhood School is a private Catholic school in Mascoutah. It offers preschool through eighth grade.

== Notable people ==
- Benno Lischer orthodontist, president of American Association of Dental Schools and American Association of Orthodontists
- Rosalind Keith actor, American film actress most known for her role in the 1937 film Motor Madness
