= East Alton–Wood River High School =

High school in Wood River, Illinois, US

Location
- 777 N. Wood River Avenue; Wood River, Illinois 62095; United States; 38°52′17.2″N 90°5′52.4″W

Information
- Type: Public high school
- Motto: Do great things
- Founded: 1919; 107 years ago
- School district: 14
- Superintendent: Rob Miller
- Principal: Leigh Robinson
- Teaching staff: 33.05 (FTE)
- Grades: 9–12
- Gender: Coed
- Enrollment: 520 (2023–24)
- Student to teacher ratio: 15.73
- Colors: Maroon and gold
- Fight song: Oiler Loyalty
- Athletics conference: Cahokia Conference
- Mascot: Oiler Dan
- Nickname: Oilers
- Rival: Roxana High School
- Newspaper: Oiler Times
- Website: eawr.org

East Alton–Wood River High School is a public high school located in Wood River, Illinois, United States.

== Athletics ==
The mascot is the Oilers which dates back to the time where the main employer in the area was Standard Oil.

== Notable alumni ==
- Jayden Ulrich (class of 2021), 2024 Olympian
- Gary Lane (class of 1961), NFL referee
- Dewayne Staats (class of 1970), broadcaster
- Roger Counsil (class of 1954), former USA Gymnastics executive director
