= Waterloo High School (Illinois) =

American high school in southern Illinois

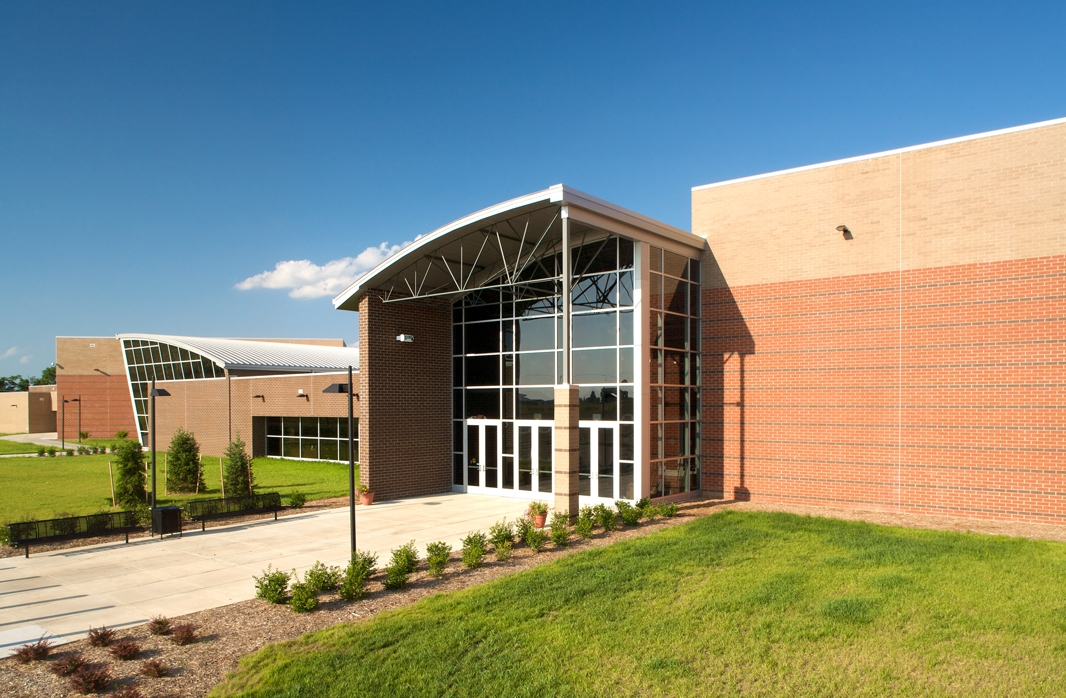

Location
- 505 East Bulldog Boulevard; Waterloo, Illinois 62298; United States; 38.3192°N 90.1392°W

Information
- Type: Public high school
- Established: 1895; 131 years ago
- School district: Waterloo Community Unit School District 5
- Superintendent: Brian Charron
- Principal: Tim McDermott
- Grades: 9–12
- Enrollment: 876 (2024–25)
- Colors: Orange and black
- Athletics conference: Mississippi Valley Conference
- Team name: Bulldogs
- Newspaper: The Orange and Black
- Yearbook: Wahischo
- Website: whs.wcusd5.net

Waterloo High School is one of two high schools in Waterloo, Illinois, the other being Gibault Catholic High School, and is the only public high school in the city.

== History ==
In 2007, ground was broken on a new building. The school's cost is roughly $38 million. The school is built on 62 acres (250,000 m^{2}) of land and holds 1,400 students. The school has a total of 57 classrooms.

Waterloo High School has an auditorium that can hold 462 people. The school also has a fitness center and weight room used for PE students and athletes, four computer labs, a library, a cafeteria, band room, chorus room, and an engineering lab. The school has an interior courtyard area for agricultural classes.

== Academics ==
Waterloo High School offers four Advanced Placement classes: AP English Language and Composition, AP English Literature and Composition, AP Chemistry, and AP Calculus AB. The school also offers 24 honors courses, three of which overlap with the school's ten dual enrollment courses. Sophomore students are able to enter into the Running Start program offered at Southwestern Illinois College if they have a minimum GPA of 3.2 and are enrolled in Algebra II Honors, allowing them to earn a high school diploma and associate's degree upon graduation. The Health Occupations dual-enrollment course is taught at the Career Center of Southern Illinois.

== Athletics ==
The school has a 20,040-square-foot (1,862 m^{2}) gym that holds a total of 2,000 people. School facilities include six tennis courts, one softball field, one baseball field, and a football/soccer field, as well as a marching band field and an eight-lane track.

Waterloo High School has the following school-sanctioned teams:

- Marching band
- Baseball
- Boys and girls basketball
- Boys and girls bowling
- Competitive cheerleading
- Boys and girls cross country
- Football
- Boys and girls golf
- Boys and girls soccer
- Softball
- Boys and girls tennis
- Boys and girls track and field
- Girls volleyball
- Boys and girls wrestling

The school participates in the Mississippi Valley Conference, which is governed by the Illinois High School Association. These teams compete in different seasons: the fall, winter, and spring seasons, each around three months long. Marching band, boys and girls cross country, football, boys and girls golf, boys soccer, girls tennis, and girls volleyball compete in the fall; boys and girls basketball, boys and girls bowling, competitive cheerleading, and boys and girls wrestling compete in the winter; and baseball, girls soccer, boys tennis, and boys and girls track and field compete in the spring. They are typically divided based on age and skill into the varsity, junior varsity, and freshman/sophomore categories.

== Notable alumni ==
- Olga Hartman (1900–1974), zoologist specializing in polychaete worms
