= Mascoutah Community Unit School District =

School district in Illinois, United States

Address
- 421 West Harnett Street Mascoutah, Illinois, 62258; United States

District information
- Type: Public
- Grades: PreK–12
- NCES District ID: 1724940

Students and staff
- Students: 4,001 (2020–2021)

Other information
- Website: msd19.org

Mascoutah Community Unit School District #19 is a school district headquartered in Mascoutah, Illinois, United States.

The district serves Mascoutah and some unincorporated areas in St. Clair County, including Scott Air Force Base. The district also serves some parts of Belleville, Illinois such as The Orchards. The district has three elementary schools which provide Kindergarten through 5th grade, a middle school that provides 6th through 8th grades, and a high school for 9th through 12th grades.

== Schools ==
=== Secondary schools ===
- Mascoutah Community High School (Mascoutah)
- Mascoutah Middle School (Mascoutah)

=== Elementary schools ===
- Mascoutah Elementary School (Mascoutah)
- Scott Elementary School (Unincorporated area, On Scott Air Force Base)
- Wingate Elementary School (Belleville)
