= Jersey Community High School =

Location
- 801 North State Street; Jerseyville, Illinois; United States; 39.12611°N 90.32959°W

Information
- Type: Public High School
- Motto: Just Commit to Higher Success
- Established: 1874, original school 2006, current building
- School district: Jersey Community Unit School District 100
- Dean: Mindy Woelfel
- Principal: Cory Breden
- Teaching staff: 55.00 (FTE)
- Grades: 8–12
- Enrollment: 986 (2023–2024)
- Student to teacher ratio: 17.93
- Campus: Suburban
- Colors: Columbia Blue and white
- Mascot: Panthers
- Website: www.jersey100.org

Jersey Community High School is a public high school in Jerseyville, Illinois. It is part of the Jersey Community Unit School District 100. Jersey Community High School has an enrollment of approximately 1,100 students and currently employs 96 teachers and staff members.

== History ==
The present high school building was built during the 2005 school year on an adjacent site. The new facility was opened on January 17, 2006, when the students returned after an extended winter break.

== Athletics ==
Jersey Community High School is a part of the Illinois High School Association, and plays in the Mississippi Valley Conference league. Its athletics director is currently Rob Steinkuehler.

The school has the following athletic programs:

=== Male athletics ===
- Baseball
- Basketball
- Bowling
- Cross country
- Football
- Golf
- Hockey
- Soccer
- Tennis
- Track
- Wrestling

=== Female athletics ===
- Basketball
- Bowling
- Cross country
- Golf
- Softball
- Soccer
- Tennis
- Track
- Volleyball
- Wrestling

== Clubs and organizations ==
The school has the following organizations:

- Alternative Fiction Club
- Art Club
- Audio Visual/Communications Club
- Cheerleading
- Class Council
- Concert band
- Cooperative Education
- Future Farmers of America
- French / German Club
- Illinois Career Association
- Illinois Youth Council
- Improv Actors
- International Thespian Society
- Jazz band
- Jazz Ensemble
- JILG (Jobs For Illinois Graduates)
- ITICAT (Alcohol and Drug Community Prevention)
- Key Club (Kiwanis-sponsored community service)
- Marching band
- Model United Nations
- Olympiad Math Contest
- Panther Chess Club
- PC Wet (Piasa Creek Watershed Education Team)
- Poms/Dance Team
- Rifle / Drill Team
- Scholastic Bowl
- Shades of Blue
- Show Choir
- Spanish Club
- Student Council
- Symphonic Band
- Talent Search
- TATU (Teens Against Tobacco Use)
- WYSE (Worldwide Youth in Science and Engineering)
- Yearbook Committee

== Notable alumni ==
- Brent Hawkins - professional football player for the Saskatchewan Roughriders of the CFL, and formerly for the Jacksonville Jaguars of the NFL
- Jana Shortal - Television news reporter in Minneapolis, Minnesota for KARE.
- Billy Hurst - Nashville recording artist, St. Louis sports photographer, class of 1992 25-year homecoming representative.
- Victor Ojeda - television reporter at KPLR-TV in St. Louis, Mo.
- Terry Shepard - Assistant Foreign News Editor, Sunday News Editor, Los Angeles Times; Deputy Associate Chancellor for Public Affairs, University of Illinois; Director of University Communications, Stanford University; Vice President for Public Affairs, Rice University.
