= Piasa, Illinois =

- Unincorporated community
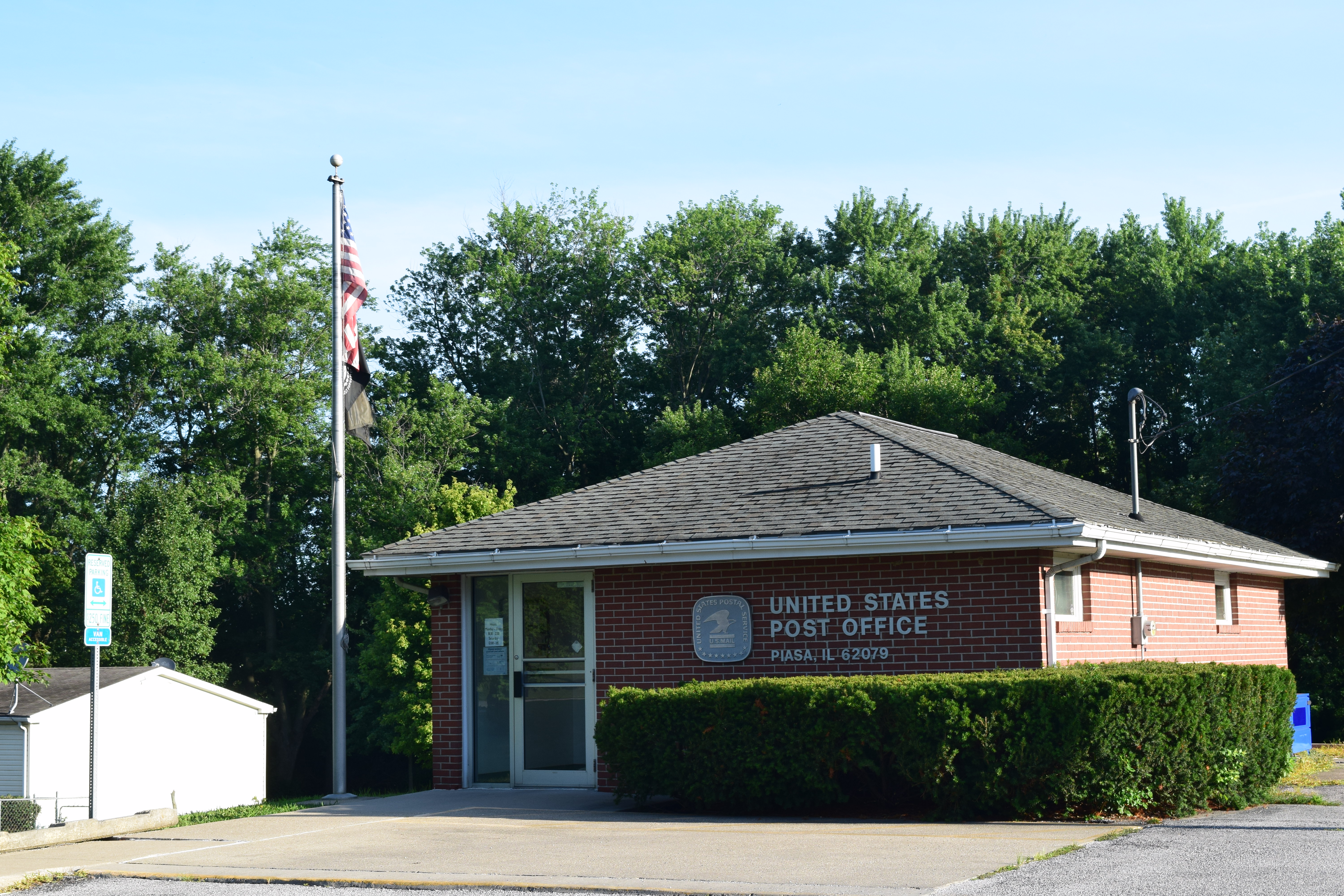
- Piasa post office

- Location within Illinois Location within the United States
- Coordinates: 39°06′57″N 90°07′25″W
- Country: United States
- State: Illinois
- County: Macoupin
- Elevation: 594 ft (181 m)
- Time zone: UTC-6 (Central (CST))
  - Summer (DST): UTC-5 (CDT)
- ZIP code: 62079
- Area code: 618
- GNIS feature ID: 415623

Piasa is an unincorporated community in Macoupin County, Illinois, United States. Piasa is located on Illinois Route 16 4 miles (6.4 km) west of Shipman. Piasa has a post office with ZIP code 62079.
