= Wood River, Illinois =

- City
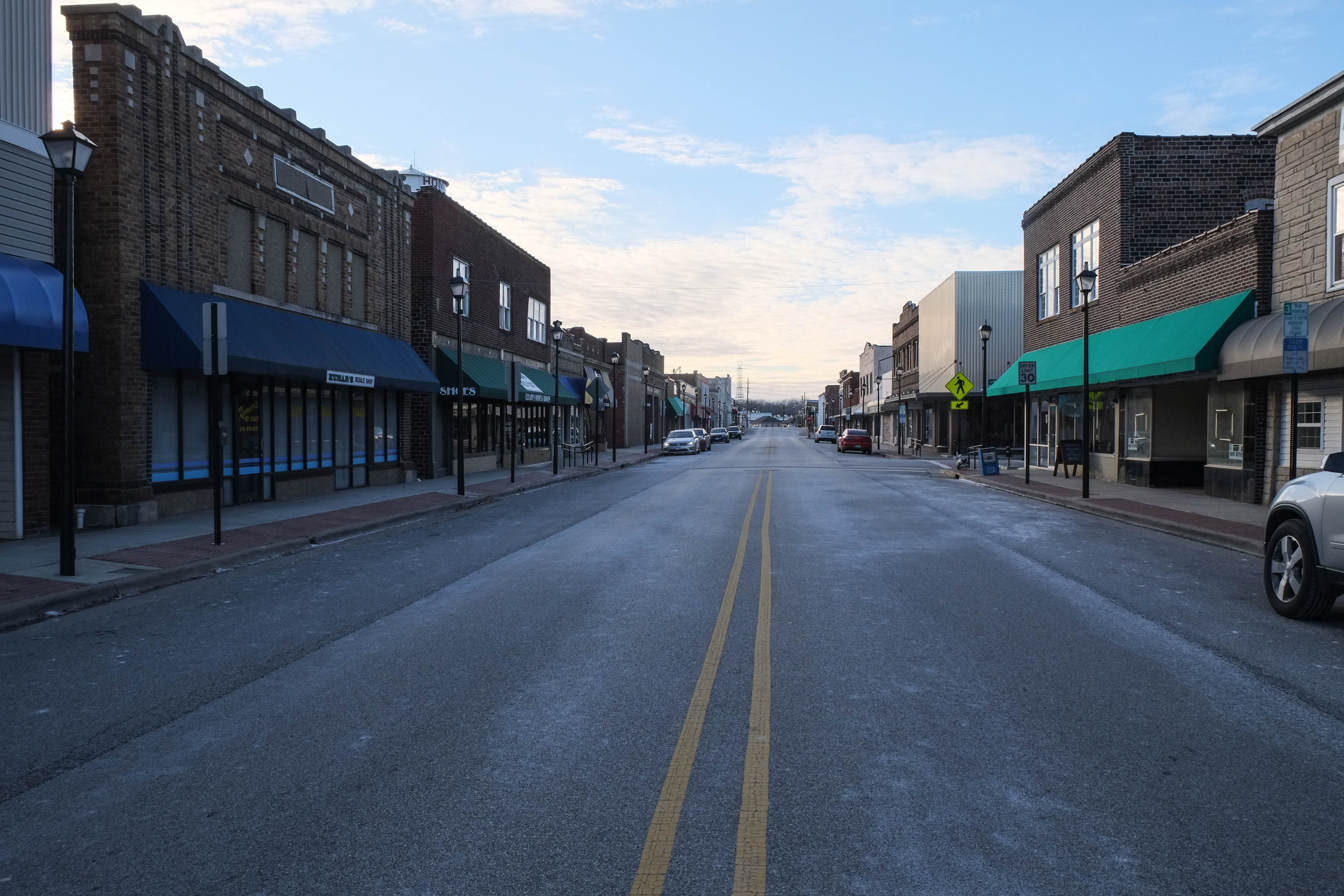
- Wood River, Illinois

- Flag Logo
- Motto: "Progressing in the Spirit of Lewis & Clark"
- Location in Madison County, Illinois
- Coordinates: 38°52′14″N 90°04′32″W
- Country: United States
- State: Illinois
- County: Madison
- Townships: Wood River; Fort Russell

Government
  - Type: Manager-Council

Area
  - Total: 7.23 sq mi (18.72 km^{2})
  - Land: 6.97 sq mi (18.06 km^{2})
  - Water: 0.25 sq mi (0.65 km^{2})
- Elevation: 436 ft (133 m)

Population (2020)
  - Total: 10,464
  - Density: 1,500.3/sq mi (579.25/km^{2})
- Time zone: UTC−6 (CST)
  - Summer (DST): UTC−5 (CDT)
- ZIP code: 62095
- Area code: 618
- FIPS code: 17-83271
- GNIS feature ID: 2397363
- Website: www.woodriver.org

Wood River is a city in Madison County, Illinois. The population was 10,464 as of the 2020 census.

Wood River developed as a company town around a Standard Oil refinery built in 1907 and 1908 and was chartered as a city in 1923. The community lies near the site of Camp River Dubois, the winter staging camp of the Lewis and Clark Expedition, a heritage reflected in the city's motto, "Progressing in the Spirit of Lewis & Clark."

== History ==
Wood River developed as a company town around an oil refinery. The Standard Oil Company broke ground on a refinery near the site in April 1907, and the plant began operating at the start of 1908. The community was founded in 1907; it merged with the neighboring settlement of East Wood River in 1910 and with Benbow City in 1917, and was chartered as a city in 1923.

Standard Oil shaped the early town beyond employment. The company purchased about two dozen Sears, Roebuck and Company mail-order houses to shelter workers, and it helped establish the community's first school and a volunteer fire department in 1909. The refinery later operated as an Amoco facility and closed in the mid-1990s; Amoco merged with British Petroleum in 1998, and a long-term environmental remediation of the site followed.

== Geography ==
Wood River is located in western Madison County on the Mississippi River approximately 15 miles (24 km) upstream of downtown St. Louis, Missouri. It is among several contiguous cities and villages that have come to be known as the "Riverbend" area. The current confluence of the Mississippi and the Missouri rivers is just south of one of these neighboring villages, Hartford. Wood River is bordered to the northwest by East Alton, to the north by Rosewood Heights, to the northeast by Bethalto, to the southeast by Roxana, to the south by Hartford, and to the southwest, across the Mississippi River, by West Alton, Missouri.

Illinois Route 3 passes through the west side of the city, leading north 5 miles (8 km) to the north side of Alton and south 18 miles (29 km) to East St. Louis. Illinois Route 143 passes through the center of Wood River as Madison Avenue, leading northwest 5 miles (8 km) to the center of Alton and southeast 9 miles (14 km) to Edwardsville. Illinois Route 111 follows Central Avenue through the center of Wood River, leading north 3.5 miles (5.6 km) to the west part of Bethalto and south 16 miles (26 km) to Washington Park. Illinois Route 255, a four-lane limited-access highway, passes through the east side of Wood River, leading northwest 10 miles (16 km) to Godfrey and south 15 miles (24 km) to Collinsville.

According to the 2021 census gazetteer files, Wood River has a total area of 7.23 square miles (18.73 km^{2}), of which 6.98 square miles (18.08 km^{2}) (or 96.53%) is land and 0.25 square miles (0.65 km^{2}) (or 3.47%) is water.

The city lies near the mouth of the Wood River, the small tributary of the Mississippi that shares its name, close to that river's confluence with the Missouri to the south.

== Demographics ==
Historical population
Census	Pop.	Note	%±
1910	84		—
1920	3,476		4,038.1%
1930	8,136		134.1%
1940	8,197		0.7%
1950	10,190		24.3%
1960	11,694		14.8%
1970	13,186		12.8%
1980	12,446		−5.6%
1990	11,490		−7.7%
2000	11,296		−1.7%
2010	10,657		−5.7%
2020	10,464		−1.8%
U.S. Decennial Census

As of the 2020 census there were 10,464 people, 4,319 households, and 2,525 families residing in the city. The population density was 1,448.10 inhabitants per square mile (559.11/km^{2}). There were 4,933 housing units . The racial makeup of the city was 88.30% White, 4.25% African American, 0.23% Native American, 0.51% Asian, 0.05% Pacific Islander, 0.72% from other races, and 5.94% from two or more races. Hispanic or Latino of any race were 2.07% of the population.

There were 4,319 households, out of which 31.9% had children under the age of 18 living with them, 37.81% were married couples living together, 16.81% had a female householder with no husband present, and 41.54% were non-families. 32.02% of all households were made up of individuals, and 11.09% had someone living alone who was 65 years of age or older. The average household size was 2.83 and the average family size was 2.32.

The city's age distribution consisted of 22.7% under the age of 18, 7.3% from 18 to 24, 31.6% from 25 to 44, 23.3% from 45 to 64, and 15.1% who were 65 years of age or older. The median age was 36.0 years. For every 100 females, there were 86.0 males. For every 100 females age 18 and over, there were 88.0 males.

The median income for a household in the city was $50,047, and the median income for a family was $61,484. Males had a median income of $42,077 versus $29,167 for females. The per capita income for the city was $26,915. About 14.9% of families and 18.0% of the population were below the poverty line, including 30.3% of those under age 18 and 11.9% of those age 65 or over.

There were 4,933 housing units at an average density of 682.67 per square mile (263.58/km^{2}), of which 9.0% were vacant. The homeowner vacancy rate was 2.1% and the rental vacancy rate was 10.2%.

The median value of owner-occupied housing units was $108,100. Among residents age 25 and older, an estimated 94.3 percent were high school graduates or higher and 15.5 percent held a bachelor's degree or higher.

Racial composition as of the 2020 census
Race	Number	Percent
White	9,240	88.3%
Black or African American	445	4.3%
American Indian and Alaska Native	24	0.2%
Asian	53	0.5%
Native Hawaiian and Other Pacific Islander	5	0.0%
Some other race	75	0.7%
Two or more races	622	5.9%
Hispanic or Latino (of any race)	217	2.1%

== Economy ==
Wood River's economy has been tied to petroleum refining since its founding around a Standard Oil refinery in 1907 and 1908. That plant later became an Amoco facility and closed in the mid-1990s. Petroleum refining remains prominent in the immediate area: the Phillips 66 Wood River Refinery, which has a crude oil processing capacity of about 345,000 barrels per day and produces transportation fuels, is located in the neighboring village of Roxana rather than within the city.

== Government ==
Wood River is governed by an elected mayor and a city council. As of 2026 the mayor is Tom Stalcup, and the council has four members. The city's departments include police, fire, public services, finance, parks and recreation, building and zoning, and a city clerk's office.

== Education ==
Public secondary education is provided by East Alton-Wood River Community High School District 14, whose high school, East Alton–Wood River High School, is located in Wood River. The school's athletic teams are nicknamed the Oilers, a reference to the Standard Oil refinery around which the town developed.

== Landmarks and culture ==
Wood River is closely associated with the Lewis and Clark Expedition. The Corps of Discovery wintered from December 1803 to May 1804 at Camp River Dubois, which stood at the mouth of the Wood River near the confluence of the Mississippi and Missouri rivers, and set out up the Missouri River on May 14, 1804. The Lewis and Clark State Historic Site, which interprets the camp and displays a full-scale keelboat replica, is located just south of the city in Hartford. Also in Hartford, the Lewis and Clark Confluence Tower, which has observation decks at 50, 100, and 150 feet, opened in 2010 to mark the bicentennial of the expedition's departure and overlooks the confluence.

Within the city, the Wood River Museum and Visitor Center, operated by the Wood River Heritage Council, presents exhibits on the town's Standard Oil refinery history and its Lewis and Clark heritage.

The Roundhouse, a community recreation building in Central Park, was built by Standard Oil in 1926 to host public events.

== Transportation ==
The nearest Amtrak station is Alton, about 8 miles to the northwest, served by the Texas Eagle and the Lincoln Service.

St. Louis Regional Airport, a general aviation airport about 3 miles to the northeast in Bethalto, has no scheduled commercial service. The nearest airport with commercial passenger service is St. Louis Lambert International Airport, about 25 miles to the west in Missouri.

Local bus service is provided by Madison County Transit, which operates several routes serving Wood River.

== Notable people ==
- Joe Astroth, Major League Baseball catcher; attended Wood River High School
- Roger Counsil, gymnastics coach who led Indiana State University to the 1977 NCAA Division I championship; a Wood River native
- Gary Lane, University of Missouri and National Football League quarterback, later an NFL official; attended Wood River High School
- Ken Retzer, Major League Baseball catcher; born in Wood River
- Dewayne Staats, television broadcaster for the Tampa Bay Rays; raised in Wood River
- John Stoneham, Major League Baseball outfielder; born in Wood River
- Jean Stothert, former mayor of Omaha, Nebraska (2013 to 2025); grew up in Wood River
- Kristopher Tharp, former member of the Illinois Senate for the 56th district (2022 to 2023)
