= Metro East =

Coordinates: 38°40′N 90°0′W

St. Louis Metro East
- Region
Interactive Map of St. Louis–St. Charles–
Farmington, MO–IL CSA
St. Louis, MO–IL MSA
City of St. Louis
Greater St. Louis (Missouri)
Metro East (Illinois)
Other Statistical Areas in the St. Louis CSA
Farmington, MO μSA
Centralia, IL μSA
- Country: United States
- State: Illinois
- Largest city: Belleville, IL
- Other cities: O'Fallon, IL; Granite City, IL; Edwardsville, IL; Alton, IL; East St. Louis, IL
- Elevation: 466–1,280 ft (142–390 m)

Population (2020)
  - Total: 681,678
- Time zone: UTC−6 (CST)
  - Summer (DST): UTC−5 (CDT)
- Area codes: 618, 730, 217, 447

The Metro East is an urban area in Southern Illinois, United States that contains the eastern and northern urban, suburban, and exurban areas on the Mississippi River in Greater St. Louis. It encompasses eight Illinois counties and constitutes the second-most populous metropolitan area in Illinois.

A historically significant region, the area included the mound building native culture of Cahokia, and the later French settlements of the Illinois Country. It also includes the fertile lands of the riparian American Bottom. The region has almost 700,000 residents and its most populated city is Belleville, with 42,404 residents. The area hosts several colleges and universities, with Southern Illinois University Edwardsville as the largest. Scott Air Force Base is located in the Metro East.

== Geography ==
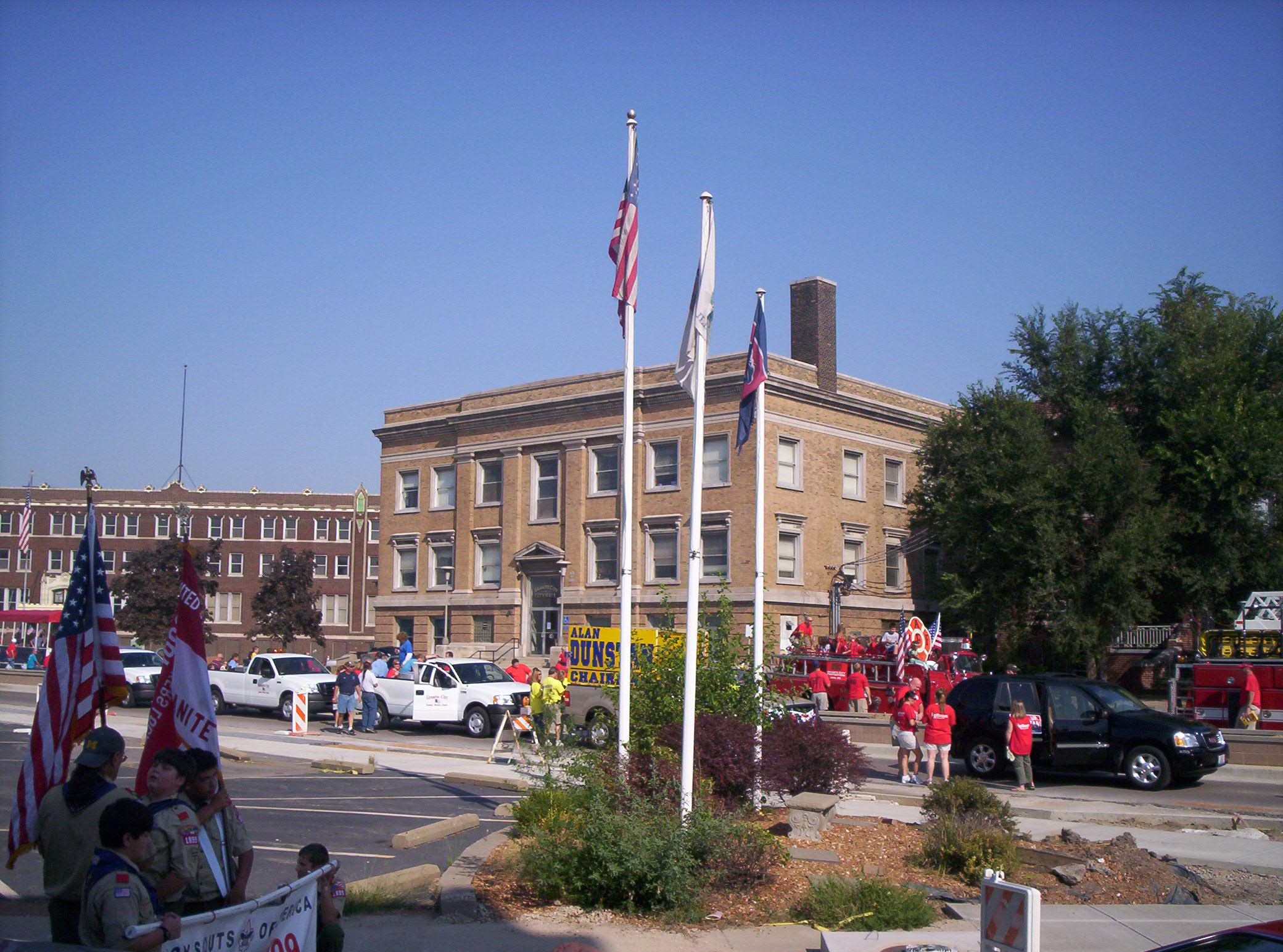
City Hall of Granite City

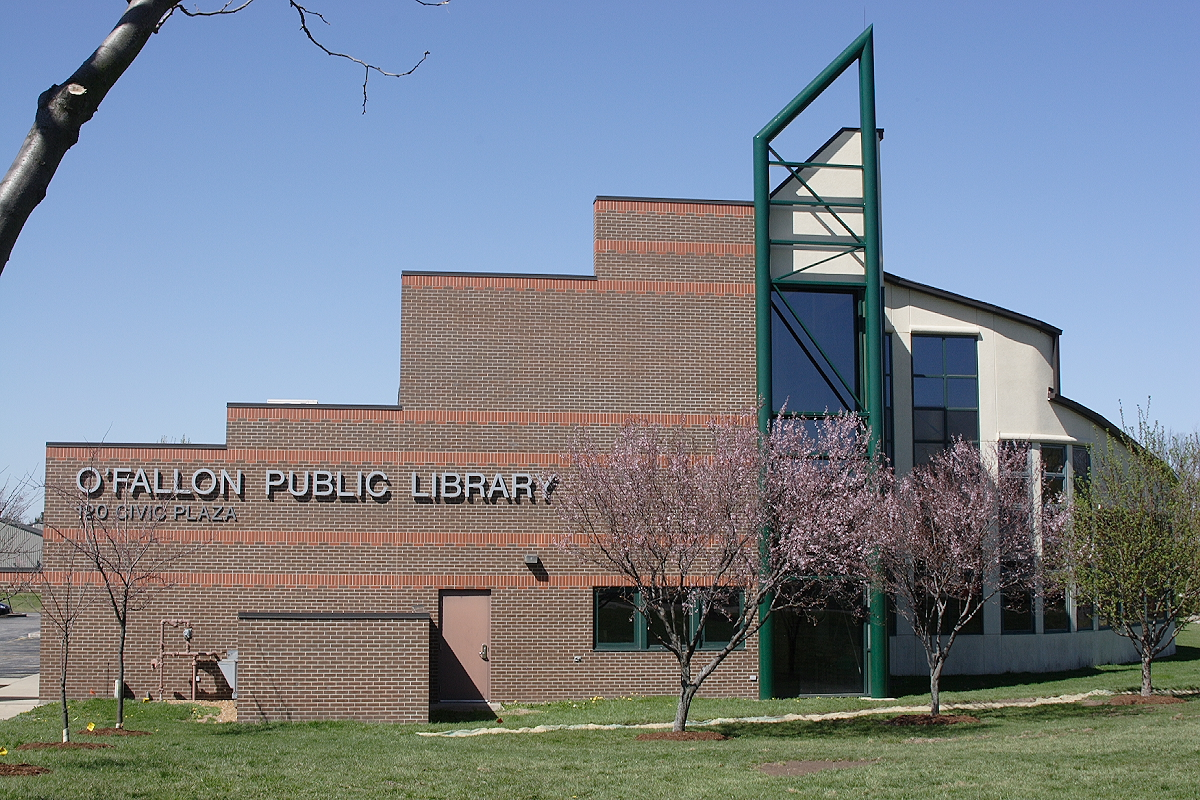
O'Fallon Public Library

The Metro East is an Illinois county-based collection of small and mid-sized cities sitting along the American Bottom and the bluffs of the Mississippi River. According to the U.S. Census Bureau, the eight counties of the region have a total area of 6,974 km^{2} (2,692 mi^{2}). 6,787 km^{2} (2,620 mi^{2}) of it is land and 186 km^{2} (71 mi^{2}) of it (2.74%) is water.

As of the 2020 census, the most populated cities in the region included the following

Principal cities

- Belleville
- O'Fallon
- Granite City
- Edwardsville
- Alton
- Collinsville

City populations

- 42,404
- 32,289
- 27,549
- 26,808
- 25,676
- 24,366

== Demographics ==
As of the 2010 census, there had been a major shift in population from the older rust belt industrial cities in the Mississippi River bottom, such as East St. Louis and Alton, to the more suburban satellite cities, such as, Belleville, Edwardsville, and O'Fallon sitting on the bluffs. This is mainly due to continued white flight.

As of the census of 2000, there were 599,845 people, 229,888 households, and 160,260 families residing in the eight Metro East counties.

The most common language is English, although various other languages are spoken. German speakers exist in southeastern Madison, and Clinton, and southern and eastern St. Clair Counties. Spanish is spoken in the Fairmont City area, and in parts of Clinton County. The largest concentration of African-Americans is in Madison, Venice, western Granite City, East St. Louis, Washington Park, Belleville, Cahokia, Alorton and Alton.

== List of counties ==
- Bond
- Calhoun
- Clinton
- Jersey
- Macoupin
- Madison
- Monroe
- St. Clair

== List of cities, towns, and villages ==
Notes:

- ^ means part of city in another county/counties
- **Bold** indicates county seat

=== Bond County ===
- Donnellson ^ (also in Montgomery County)
- **Greenville**
- Keyesport ^ (also in Clinton County)
- Mulberry Grove
- Old Ripley
- Panama ^ (also in Montgomery County)
- Pierron ^ (also in Madison County)
- Pocahontas
- Smithboro
- Sorento

=== Calhoun County ===
- Batchtown
- Brussels
- Hamburg
- **Hardin**
- Kampsville

=== Clinton County ===
- Albers
- Aviston
- Bartelso
- Beckemeyer
- Breese
- **Carlyle**
- Centralia ^ (also in Marion County)
- Damiansville
- Germantown
- Huey
- Keyesport ^ (also in Bond County)
- New Baden ^ (also in St. Clair County)
- Trenton
- Wamac ^ (also in Washington and Marion Counties)

=== Jersey County ===
- Brighton ^ (also in Macoupin County)
- Chautauqua
- Delhi
- Dow
- Elsah
- Fidelity
- Fieldon
- Grafton
- **Jerseyville**
- Otterville

=== Macoupin County ===
- Benld
- Brighton ^ (also in Jersey County)
- Bunker Hill
- **Carlinville**
- Chesterfield
- Dorchester
- Eagarville
- East Gillespie
- Gillespie
- Girard
- Hettick
- Lake Ka-ho
- Medora ^ (also in Jersey County)
- Modesto
- Mount Clare
- Mount Olive
- Nilwood
- Palmyra
- Royal Lakes
- Sawyerville
- Scottville
- Shipman
- Standard City
- Staunton
- Virden ^ (also in Sangamon County)
- White City
- Wilsonville

=== Madison County ===
- Alhambra
- Alton
- Bethalto
- Collinsville ^ (also in St. Clair County)
- Dorsey
- East Alton
- **Edwardsville**
- Fairmont City ^ (also in St. Clair County)
- Glen Carbon
- Godfrey
- Granite City
- Hamel
- Highland
- Livingston
- Madison
- Marine
- Maryville
- New Douglas
- Pierron ^ (also in Bond County)
- Pontoon Beach
- Roxana
- South Roxana
- St. Jacob
- Troy
- Venice
- Wood River
- Worden

=== Monroe County ===
- Columbia ^ (also in St. Clair County)
- Fults
- Hecker ^ (also in St. Clair County)
- Mayestown
- Valmeyer
- **Waterloo**

=== St. Clair County ===
- **Belleville**
- Brooklyn
- Cahokia Heights
- Caseyville
- Collinsville ^ (also in Madison County)
- Columbia ^ (also in Monroe County)
- Dupo
- East St. Louis
- Fairmont City ^ (also in Madison County)
- Fairview Heights
- Fayetteville
- Freeburg
- Hecker ^ (also in Monroe County)
- Lebanon
- Lenzburg
- Marissa
- Mascoutah
- Millstadt
- New Athens
- O'Fallon
- St. Libory
- Sauget
- Scott AFB
- Shiloh
- Summerfield
- Smithton
- Swansea
- Washington Park

== Colleges and universities ==
- Greenville University
- Kaskaskia College
- Lewis and Clark Community College
- McKendree University
- Principia College
- Southern Illinois University Edwardsville
- Southwestern Illinois College

== Transportation ==
=== State routes ===
- Illinois Route 3
- Illinois Route 4
- Illinois Route 13
- Illinois Route 15
- Illinois Route 16
- Illinois Route 100
- Illinois Route 109
- Illinois Route 111
- Illinois Route 127
- Illinois Route 140
- Illinois Route 143
- Illinois Route 153
- Illinois Route 156
- Illinois Route 157
- Illinois Route 158
- Illinois Route 159
- Illinois Route 160
- Illinois Route 161
- Illinois Route 162
- Illinois Route 163
- Illinois Route 177
- Illinois Route 203
- Illinois Route 255 (an extension of I-255)
- Illinois Route 267

=== U.S. routes ===
- U.S. Route 40
- U.S. Route 50
- U.S. Route 51
- Historic U.S. Route 66
- U.S. Route 67

=== Interstate freeways ===
- I-55
- I-64
- I-70
- I-255
- I-270

=== Public transit ===
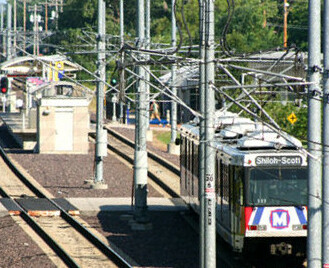
MetroLink in Belleville, Illinois

Public transit service in St. Clair County is provided by Metro Transit in partnership with the St. Clair County Transit District. Service includes local bus lines and the MetroLink light rail system. MetroLink has 11 stations in Illinois between the East St. Louis Riverfront and Scott Air Force Base. It links the suburban Metro East to St. Louis Lambert International Airport on the Red Line and Shrewsbury, Missouri on the Blue Line. Intermediate stops include downtown St. Louis, area universities and hospitals, and downtown Clayton.

In 2019, the St. Clair County Transit District was awarded $96 million in Illinois infrastructure funding to build a 5.2-mile (8.4 km) extension of the Red Line from Shiloh-Scott to MidAmerica St. Louis Airport in Mascoutah. This extension will include two 2.6-mile (4.2 km) segments, a double-track and a single-track segment, along with a station at the airport. Construction on the extension began in 2023 with Metro expecting to begin operations in early 2026.

Additionally, Madison County Transit operates local bus service in that county with routes that serve downtown St. Louis transit centers.

== Major employers ==
- Anheuser-Busch
- Boeing
- Charter Communications
- Illinois Department of Transportation
- Monsanto
- National Steel
- Norrenberns Trucking
- Olin Corporation
- Scott Air Force Base
- Southern Illinois University Edwardsville
- U.S. Steel
- Wood River Refinery

== Notable attractions ==
- National Shrine of Our Lady of the Snows, Centreville, near Belleville; operated by the Missionary Oblates of Mary Immaculate
- Brooks Catsup Bottle, Collinsville
- Belle Clair Fairgrounds and Expo Center, Belleville
- Cahokia Mounds, Collinsville, on Madison-St. Clair County line
- GCS Ballpark, Sauget
- Gateway International Raceway, Madison
- Eads Bridge, historic bridge, among East. Louis, on the East St. Louis, Illinois, and St. Louis, Missouri border, over the Mississippi River
- Pere Marquette State Park, Grafton
- St. Clair Square, Fairview Heights
- Robert Wadlow Statue, Alton
- Horseshoe Lake, Pontoon Beach, Madison, and Granite City
- Alton Square Mall, Alton
- Carlyle Lake, Carlyle
- National Building Arts Center, Sauget

== Residents, historic figures, and contributors ==
- Josephine Baker, East St. Louis, performer and activist
- Jason Boyd, Edwardsville, AAA pitcher
- Jimmy Connors, East St. Louis and Belleville, tennis player
- Neal Cotts, Lebanon, former MLB pitcher
- Brian Daubach, Belleville, former MLB 1B/DH/outfielder
- Miles Davis, East St. Louis and Alton, jazz artist
- Lea DeLaria, Belleville, jazz singer, actress, and comedian (Orange is the New Black)
- Elizabeth Donald, Edwardsville, horror novelist
- Dick Durbin, East St. Louis, U.S. senator
- Buddy Ebsen, Belleville, television actor
- Jay Farrar, Belleville, musician
- William Holden, O'Fallon, film actor
- Louis Jolliet, explorer of the Mississippi River
- Jackie Joyner-Kersee, East St. Louis, Olympic athlete
- Ken Kwapis, Belleville, film and television director and producer
- Père Jacques Marquette, French discoverer
- T. J. Mathews, Columbia, former MLB pitcher
- Laurie Metcalf, Edwardsville, film and television actress (Rosanne, Uncle Buck, JFK)
- Yadier Molina, Caseyville, Cardinals Baseball catcher (resides there only during baseball season, and is originally from Puerto Rico)
- Jake Odorizzi, Highland, MLB Pitcher
- Van Allen Plexico, Smithton, author and professor
- Peter Sarsgaard, Belleville/Scott AFB, actor (Magnificent Seven, Jarhead, Green Lantern)
- John Shimkus, Collinsville, Congressman from Illinois's 15th congressional district (1997–2021)
- Michael Stipe, Collinsville, lead singer of the band REM
- Jeff Tweedy, Belleville, lead singer of the band Wilco
- Uncle Tupelo, Belleville, alternative country band
- Craig Virgin, distance runner
- Robert Pershing Wadlow, Alton, world's tallest man
- Scott Wolf, Belleville, actor

== Media in the Metro East ==
=== St. Louis area TV stations ===
- Note: This list is for the entire Metro East area; however, the low-powered stations may not reach the entire five-county Metro East area. WSIU, despite not being based from the St. Louis DMA, is available in Clinton, Washington, and most of St. Clair.

=== Champaign-Urbana/Decatur/Springfield area TV stations ===
- Note: This list is for Jersey County; however, the majority of these stations are not available for most Jersey County residents. These stations are more likely to be available in Greene and Macoupin counties, which border Jersey County.

=== Paducah/Cape Girardeau/Harrisburg area TV stations ===
- Note: This list is for St. Clair, and Clinton counties; however, the majority of the stations, with the exception of WSIU and WPXS and possibly KFVS, are not available for a majority of the St. Clair, and/or Clinton County residents. These stations are more likely to be available in Washington County and the Centralia area.

=== Daily newspapers ===
- Note: daily newspaper coverage depends on county.
- Riverbender.com (Madison, Jersey counties)
- EdGlenToday (Madison county)
- The Metro East Star (St. Clair, Madison counties)
- Alton Telegraph (Madison, Jersey counties)
- Belleville News-Democrat (region-wide)
- Centralia Sentinel (Clinton and Washington counties)
- Southern Illinoisan (mainly in Washington County, rarely found elsewhere in the Metro East)
- St. Louis Post-Dispatch (region-wide)
- Edwardsville Intelligencer (Madison County)

=== Radio stations ===
- Note: stations listed are licensed and have offices in Metro East counties only. Stations that can be heard in the Metro East but not listed have offices outside the Metro East counties.
- WSIE 88.7 FM (Edwardsville), Jazz/Public radio
- WLCA 89.9 FM (Godfrey), Alternative/College radio
- WIBI 91.1 FM (Carlinville), Christian contemporary
- W224DC 92.7 FM (Caseyville), Catholic
- W232CR 94.3 FM (Alton), Oldies
- WRXX 95.3 FM (Centralia), Pop
- KXBS 95.5 FM (Bethalto), Christian rhythmic contemporary
- WCXO 96.7 FM (Carlyle), Adult hits
- WDLJ 97.5 FM (Breese), Classic rock
- WXOS 101.1 FM (East St. Louis), Sports
- WGEL 101.7 FM (Greenville), Country
- W279AQ 103.7 FM (Mascoutah), Black-oriented news
- WJAF-LP 103.7 FM (Centralia), Classic hits
- WNSV 104.7 FM (Nashville), Hot AC
- KTLK 104.9 FM (Columbia), Conservative talk
- WAOX 105.3 FM (Staunton), Hot AC
- KPNT 105.7 FM (Collinsville), Alternative
- WSMI 106.1 FM (Litchfield). Country
- WARH 106.5 FM (Granite City), Adult Hits
- W296DR 107.1 FM (Alton) News/Talk
- KFNS 590 AM (Wood River), Sports
- WIJR 880 AM (Highland), Regional Mexican
- WRYT 1080 AM (Edwardsville), Catholic
- WILY 1210 AM (Centralia), Oldies
- WSDZ 1260 AM (Belleville), Catholic
- WJBM 1480 AM (Jerseyville), Talk
- WSMI 1540 AM (Litchfield), Classic Country
- WBGZ 1570 AM (Alton), News/Talk

See also: Radio stations in Illinois

=== The Metro East in film ===
- Note, the following is a partial list of films shot, often partially, sometimes with significant production, within the Metro East. All data can be rechecked via the Internet Movie Database.

"Uncredited" means a Metro East location was not credited within the database, but was clearly shot on Metro East soil upon watching the film itself.

- In the Heat of the Night - feature-length film, shot in Belleville, Illinois (1968 Oscar winner for Best Picture of 1967)
- Things Are Tough All Over (uncredited) - feature-length film, shot on the East St. Louis riverfront (1982)
- King of the Hill - feature-length film, shot in Alton, Illinois (1993)
- A Will of their Own - feature-length TV film, shot in Belleville, Illinois (1998)
- The Big Brass Ring - feature-length film, shot in Alton, Illinois (1999)
- Steel City - feature-length film, shot in Alton, East Alton, Godfrey, and Jerseyville, Illinois (2006)
- The Lucky Ones - feature-length film, Shot in Edwardsville, Illinois (2008)
- The Coverup - feature-length film, shot in Alton, Illinois (2008)
- Kingshighway - feature-length film, shot in Fairview Heights, Illinois (2010)
- Joint Body - feature-length film, shot in various locations throughout the Metro East (2011)

=== Metro East in fiction ===
Laurell K. Hamilton has used the Metro East as a setting in several books from the Anita Blake and Merry Gentry series. In the Merry Gentry series, fairies of the Unseelie Court have made their home in Monk's Mound.

Robert J. Randisi set one of his Joe Keough mysteries, East of the Arch (2002), in the Metro East communities of East St. Louis and Fairview Heights.

== Awards ==
The 2010 issue of Family Circle magazine named Edwardsville third in their "Top 10 Best Towns for Families".

== Area codes ==
- Area code 217: extreme northeast part of Metro East
- Area code 618: the majority of the Metro East is in this area code.
