= Hettick, Illinois =

- Village
- Location in Macoupin County, Illinois
- Coordinates: 39°21′21″N 90°02′15″W
- Country: United States
- State: Illinois
- County: Macoupin
- Townships: Barr, South Palmyra

Area
  - Total: 0.37 sq mi (0.95 km^{2})
  - Land: 0.37 sq mi (0.95 km^{2})
  - Water: 0 sq mi (0.00 km^{2})
- Elevation: 600 ft (180 m)

Population (2020)
  - Total: 149
  - Density: 407.9/sq mi (157.49/km^{2})
- Time zone: UTC-6 (CST)
  - Summer (DST): UTC-5 (CDT)
- ZIP code: 62649
- Area code: 618
- FIPS code: 17-34423
- GNIS feature ID: 2398498

Hettick is a village in west-central Macoupin County, Illinois, United States. The population was 149 at the 2020 census, down from 181 in 2010.

== Geography ==
Hettick is located in western Macoupin County 13 miles (21 km) northwest of Carlinville, the county seat. Illinois Route 111 passes through the village as Main Street, leading north 6 miles (10 km) to Palmyra and south 7 miles (11 km) to Chesterfield.

According to the 2021 census gazetteer files, Hettick has a total area of 0.37 square miles (0.96 km^{2}), all land. The village sits on a ridge that drains northwest to Solomon Creek and southeast to Nassa Creek, both part of the Macoupin Creek watershed leading west to the Illinois River.

== Demographics ==
Historical population
Census	Pop.	Note	%±
1900	259		—
1910	306		18.1%
1920	298		−2.6%
1930	220		−26.2%
1940	290		31.8%
1950	268		−7.6%
1960	253		−5.6%
1970	258		2.0%
1980	262		1.6%
1990	211		−19.5%
2000	182		−13.7%
2010	181		−0.5%
2020	149		−17.7%
U.S. Decennial Census

As of the 2020 census there were 149 people, 71 households, and 40 families residing in the village. The population density was 408.22 inhabitants per square mile (157.61/km^{2}). There were 70 housing units at an average density of 191.78 per square mile (74.05/km^{2}). The racial makeup of the village was 95.30% White, 0.00% African American, 0.00% Native American, 0.00% Asian, 0.00% Pacific Islander, 0.00% from other races, and 4.70% from two or more races. Hispanic or Latino of any race were 1.34% of the population.

There were 71 households, out of which 18.3% had children under the age of 18 living with them, 46.48% were married couples living together, 4.23% had a female householder with no husband present, and 43.66% were non-families. 36.62% of all households were made up of individuals, and 15.49% had someone living alone who was 65 years of age or older. The average household size was 2.53 and the average family size was 2.06.

The village's age distribution consisted of 14.4% under the age of 18, 5.5% from 18 to 24, 23.3% from 25 to 44, 30.2% from 45 to 64, and 26.7% who were 65 years of age or older. The median age was 52.5 years. For every 100 females, there were 165.5 males. For every 100 females age 18 and over, there were 150.0 males.

The median income for a household in the village was $51,250, and the median income for a family was $71,250. Males had a median income of $44,688 versus $40,000 for females. The per capita income for the village was $31,065. About 22.5% of families and 22.6% of the population were below the poverty line, including 42.9% of those under age 18 and 5.1% of those age 65 or over.
