= Chesterfield, Illinois =

- Village
- Location in Macoupin County, Illinois
- Coordinates: 39°15′24″N 90°04′00″W
- Country: United States
- State: Illinois
- County: Macoupin
- Township: Chesterfield

Area
  - Total: 0.54 sq mi (1.40 km^{2})
  - Land: 0.54 sq mi (1.40 km^{2})
  - Water: 0 sq mi (0.00 km^{2})
- Elevation: 594 ft (181 m)

Population (2020)
  - Total: 170
  - Density: 314.4/sq mi (121.38/km^{2})
- Time zone: UTC-6 (CST)
  - Summer (DST): UTC-5 (CDT)
- ZIP code: 62630
- Area code: 618
- FIPS code: 17-13165
- GNIS feature ID: 2397617

Chesterfield is a village in Macoupin County, Illinois, United States. The population was 170 at the 2020 census.

== History ==
It is believed that the original owners of the land, both Jesse Peebles and Aaron Tilly, were the ones who established the town in 1836. It is thought that the settlement got its name from the men's hometown of Chesterfield in Derbyshire, England. A post office was constructed in 1838 and Chesterfield was incorporated as a village in 1882. Reverend Jesse Peebles was buried in Peebles Cemetery in 1864, named after him and his family.

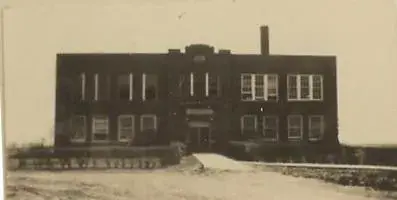
Chesterfield High School in 1934

Chesterfield High School served the community from the late 1800s until 1947. By 1949 many educational consolidation issues were solved and Chesterfield students began attending classes at Carlinville High School.

== Geography ==
Chesterfield is located in western Macoupin County. Illinois Route 111 passes through the village as Main Street, leading north 7 miles (11 km) to Hettick and southwest 8 miles (13 km) to Medora. Carlinville, the Macoupin county seat, is 12 miles (19 km) to the east via Routes 111 and 108.

According to the 2021 census gazetteer files, Chesterfield has a total area of 0.54 square miles (1.40 km^{2}), all land. The village drains north to Bear Creek, a west-flowing tributary of Hodges Creek and subsequently Macoupin Creek, part of the Illinois River watershed.

== Demographics ==
Historical population
Census	Pop.	Note	%±
1880	195		—
1890	374		91.8%
1900	377		0.8%
1910	364		−3.4%
1920	363		−0.3%
1930	325		−10.5%
1940	290		−10.8%
1950	272		−6.2%
1960	280		2.9%
1970	262		−6.4%
1980	280		6.9%
1990	230		−17.9%
2000	223		−3.0%
2010	188		−15.7%
2020	170		−9.6%
U.S. Decennial Census

As of the 2020 census there were 170 people, 75 households, and 62 families residing in the village. The population density was 314.23 inhabitants per square mile (121.32/km^{2}). There were 77 housing units at an average density of 142.33 per square mile (54.95/km^{2}). The racial makeup of the village was 91.76% White, 0.59% African American, 0.00% Native American, 0.00% Asian, 0.00% Pacific Islander, 0.00% from other races, and 7.65% from two or more races. Hispanic or Latino of any race were 2.35% of the population.

There were 75 households, out of which 58.7% had children under the age of 18 living with them, 69.33% were married couples living together, 12.00% had a female householder with no husband present, and 17.33% were non-families. 9.33% of all households were made up of individuals, and 1.33% had someone living alone who was 65 years of age or older. The average household size was 3.03 and the average family size was 2.77.

The village's age distribution consisted of 28.8% under the age of 18, 7.2% from 18 to 24, 38.9% from 25 to 44, 13.1% from 45 to 64, and 12.0% who were 65 years of age or older. The median age was 31.8 years. For every 100 females, there were 110.1 males. For every 100 females age 18 and over, there were 108.5 males.

The median income for a household in the village was $53,977, and the median income for a family was $54,091. Males had a median income of $43,281 versus $17,143 for females. The per capita income for the village was $22,360. About 9.7% of families and 11.1% of the population were below the poverty line, including 6.8% of those under age 18 and 8.0% of those age 65 or over.
