= Carlinville High School =

American high school in southern Illinois

Location
- 829 West Main Street; Carlinville, Illinois; United States; 39.2791°N 89.8932°W

Information
- Type: Public high school
- Motto: "Excellence...A Carlinville Tradition", "Students First"
- School district: Carlinville CUSD #1
- Principal: Patrick T. Drew
- Staff: 32.55 (FTE)
- Grades: 9–12
- Enrollment: 361 (2023–24)
- Student to teacher ratio: 11.09
- Campus type: Rural
- Colors: Cardinal red and royal blue
- Nickname: Cavaliers
- Yearbook: Carlin-HI
- Website: cusd1.com

Carlinville High School is a public high school located in Carlinville, Illinois that serves students from the surrounding areas of Carlinville, Chesterfield, Standard City, Atwater, and Plainview.

== History ==
A portion of the school was destroyed by fire on September 13, 1987. Despite this devastating fire, students were able to resume classes two days later, and the school continues to operate to this day.

== Academics ==
Carlinville High School is a 2015 U.S. News Best High Schools Silver Medal winner, ranked as the 83rd best high school in Illinois. The school has a student-teacher ratio of 14:1. The average class size is 17. The school had a 4-year graduation rate of 81% in 2014, lower than the state average of 86%. The 2014 5-year graduation rate was 88%. The school's 2014 graduating class had an average ACT Composite score of 22. In 2014, 57% of students scored at least a 21 on the ACT, the state's college readiness benchmark.

Currently, the school offers 7 Advanced Placement courses: AP Biology, AP Calculus AB, AP Chemistry, AP English Language and Composition, AP English Literature and Composition, AP Psychology, and AP United States History. In addition, the school offers 27 dual credit courses through Lewis and Clark Community College.

== Athletics and activities ==
Boys Athletics

- Baseball
- Basketball
- Cross Country
- Football
- Golf
- Soccer
- Track & Field
- Wrestling

Girls Athletics

- Basketball
- Cross Country
- Cheerleading
- Dance
- Golf
- Softball
- Soccer
- Track & Field
- Volleyball

Activities

- Band
- Marching Cavaliers
- Choir
- National FFA Organization
- Scholastic Bowl
- All-School Musical
- Student Council
- Worldwide Youth in Science and Engineering
- Model United Nations
- Family, Career and Community Leaders of America
- Envirothon
- Math Team

== Notable alumni ==
- Kyle Dixon, NFL wide receiver for the New England Patriots
