= Scottville, Illinois =

- Village
- Location in Macoupin County, Illinois
- Coordinates: 39°28′40″N 90°06′14″W
- Country: United States
- State: Illinois
- County: Macoupin
- Township: Scottville

Area
  - Total: 1.00 sq mi (2.58 km^{2})
  - Land: 1.00 sq mi (2.58 km^{2})
  - Water: 0 sq mi (0.00 km^{2})
- Elevation: 653 ft (199 m)

Population (2020)
  - Total: 93
  - Density: 93.3/sq mi (36.03/km^{2})
- Time zone: UTC-6 (CST)
  - Summer (DST): UTC-5 (CDT)
- ZIP codes: 62683 (Scottville); 62674 (Palmyra)
- Area code: 217
- FIPS code: 17-68406
- GNIS feature ID: 2399777

Scottville is a village in Macoupin County, Illinois, United States. The population was 93 at the 2020 census down from 116 in 2010.

== History ==
It is believed that a man named Benjamin Stephenson (no relation to Illinois politician Benjamin Stephenson) laid out the town in 1835. However it would not be until 1885 that Scottville was incorporated as a village. A post office was finally opened in that same year, since 2012 the village has no such post office.

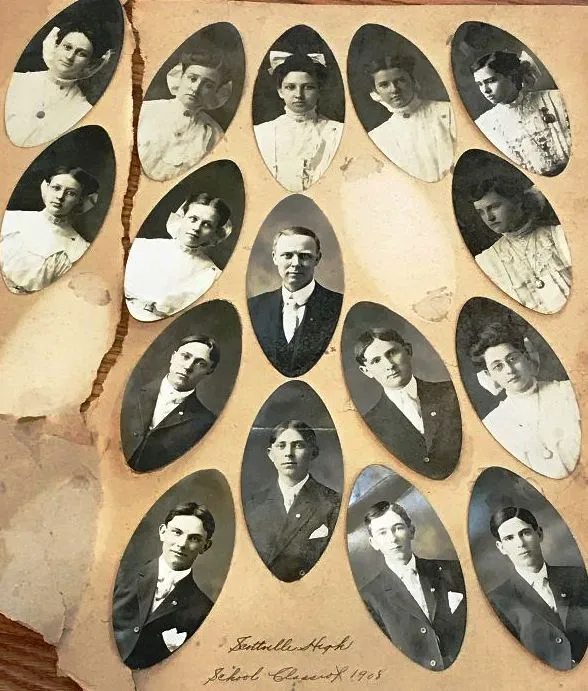
Scottville High School Class of 1908

Scottville High School served the village from the late 1800s through 1948. That same year Scottville, Palmyra, Modesto, and Hettick formed the Northwestern School District to consolidate their educational efforts. Today, students from Scottville attend Northwestern Jr-Sr High School in Palmyra.

Despite a peak population of 364 in the 1900 census, it has since dwindled to only 93 people in 2020.

== Geography ==
Scottville is located in northwestern Macoupin County. It is 8 miles (13 km) northwest of Palmyra and 24 miles (39 km) northwest of Carlinville, the county seat.

According to the 2021 census gazetteer files, Scottville has a total area of 1.00 square mile (2.59 km^{2}), all land. Headwaters of Rock Branch flow through the village, leading northwest to Apple Creek, a west-flowing tributary of the Illinois River.

== Demographics ==
Historical population
Census	Pop.	Note	%±
1880	284		—
1890	363		27.8%
1900	364		0.3%
1910	301		−17.3%
1920	285		−5.3%
1930	198		−30.5%
1940	277		39.9%
1950	200		−27.8%
1960	186		−7.0%
1970	196		5.4%
1980	214		9.2%
1990	165		−22.9%
2000	140		−15.2%
2010	116		−17.1%
2020	93		−19.8%
U.S. Decennial Census

As of the 2020 census there were 93 people, 58 households, and 31 families residing in the village. The population density was 93.28 inhabitants per square mile (36.02/km^{2}). There were 44 housing units at an average density of 44.13 per square mile (17.04/km^{2}). The racial makeup of the village was 100.00% White, 0.00% African American, 0.00% Native American, 0.00% Asian, 0.00% Pacific Islander, 0.00% from other races, and 0.00% from two or more races. Hispanic or Latino of any race were 0.00% of the population.

There were 58 households, out of which 13.8% had children under the age of 18 living with them, 50.00% were married couples living together, 3.45% had a female householder with no husband present, and 46.55% were non-families. 31.03% of all households were made up of individuals, and 27.59% had someone living alone who was 65 years of age or older. The average household size was 2.35 and the average family size was 2.14.

The village's age distribution consisted of 12.9% under the age of 18, 4.0% from 18 to 24, 15.3% from 25 to 44, 13.6% from 45 to 64, and 54.0% who were 65 years of age or older. The median age was 67.4 years. For every 100 females, there were 69.9 males. For every 100 females age 18 and over, there were 61.2 males.

The median income for a household in the village was $48,750, and the median income for a family was $56,518. Males had a median income of $33,750 versus $21,250 for females. The per capita income for the village was $22,705. About 6.5% of families and 11.0% of the population were below the poverty line, including 20.0% of those under age 18 and 7.5% of those age 65 or over.
