= Modesto, Illinois =

- Village
- Location in Macoupin County, Illinois
- Coordinates: 39°28′44″N 89°58′49″W
- Country: United States
- State: Illinois
- County: Macoupin
- Township: North Palmyra

Area
  - Total: 0.56 sq mi (1.45 km^{2})
  - Land: 0.56 sq mi (1.45 km^{2})
  - Water: 0 sq mi (0.00 km^{2})
- Elevation: 679 ft (207 m)

Population (2020)
  - Total: 182
  - Density: 325.3/sq mi (125.61/km^{2})
- Time zone: UTC-6 (CST)
  - Summer (DST): UTC-5 (CDT)
- ZIP code: 62667
- Area code: 217
- FIPS code: 17-49802
- GNIS feature ID: 2399379

Modesto is a village in Macoupin County, Illinois, United States. The population was 182 at the 2020 census, down from 252 in 2000.

== Geography ==
Modesto is located in northern Macoupin County. Illinois Route 111 passes through the village as Main Street, leading north 8 miles (13 km) to Waverly and south 3 miles (5 km) to Palmyra. Carlinville, the Macoupin county seat, is 19 miles (31 km) to the southeast.

According to the 2021 census gazetteer files, Modesto has a total area of 0.56 square miles (1.45 km^{2}), all land. The village drains east to an unnamed tributary of Nassa Creek, a southwest-flowing feeder of the Macoupin Creek watershed leading west to the Illinois River.

== Demographics ==
Historical population
Census	Pop.	Note	%±
1900	299		—
1910	298		−0.3%
1920	280		−6.0%
1930	246		−12.1%
1940	276		12.2%
1950	232		−15.9%
1960	228		−1.7%
1970	221		−3.1%
1980	260		17.6%
1990	240		−7.7%
2000	252		5.0%
2010	189		−25.0%
2020	182		−3.7%
U.S. Decennial Census

As of the 2020 census there were 182 people, 87 households, and 53 families residing in the village. The population density was 325.58 inhabitants per square mile (125.71/km^{2}). There were 87 housing units at an average density of 155.64 per square mile (60.09/km^{2}). The racial makeup of the village was 96.15% White, 0.00% African American, 0.55% Native American, 0.00% Asian, 0.00% Pacific Islander, 0.00% from other races, and 3.30% from two or more races. Hispanic or Latino of any race were 0.00% of the population.

There were 87 households, out of which 29.9% had children under the age of 18 living with them, 44.83% were married couples living together, 12.64% had a female householder with no husband present, and 39.08% were non-families. 36.78% of all households were made up of individuals, and 18.39% had someone living alone who was 65 years of age or older. The average household size was 3.40 and the average family size was 2.55.

The village's age distribution consisted of 24.3% under the age of 18, 5.0% from 18 to 24, 20.3% from 25 to 44, 28.5% from 45 to 64, and 22.1% who were 65 years of age or older. The median age was 46.5 years. For every 100 females, there were 133.7 males. For every 100 females age 18 and over, there were 104.9 males.

The median income for a household in the village was $59,375, and the median income for a family was $74,750. Males had a median income of $50,250 versus $24,583 for females. The per capita income for the village was $23,683. About 9.4% of families and 14.4% of the population were below the poverty line, including 14.8% of those under age 18 and 10.2% of those age 65 or over.
