= Illinois Route 108 =

State highway in western Illinois, US

Illinois Route 108
- IL 108 highlighted in red

Route information
- Maintained by IDOT
- Length: 54.06 mi (87.00 km)
- Existed: 1924–present

Major junctions
- West end: IL 100 in Kampsville
- US 67 in Carrollton
- East end: I-55 in Raymond

Location
- Country: United States
- State: Illinois
- Counties: Calhoun, Greene, Macoupin, Montgomery

Highway system
- Illinois State Highway System; Interstate; US; State; Tollways; Scenic
← IL 107	→ IL 109

Illinois Route 108 is an east–west highway in western Illinois. Its western terminus is at Illinois Route 100 in Kampsville, and its eastern terminus is at Interstate 55 in Zanesville Township near Raymond. This is a distance of 54.06 miles (87.00 km).

== Route description ==
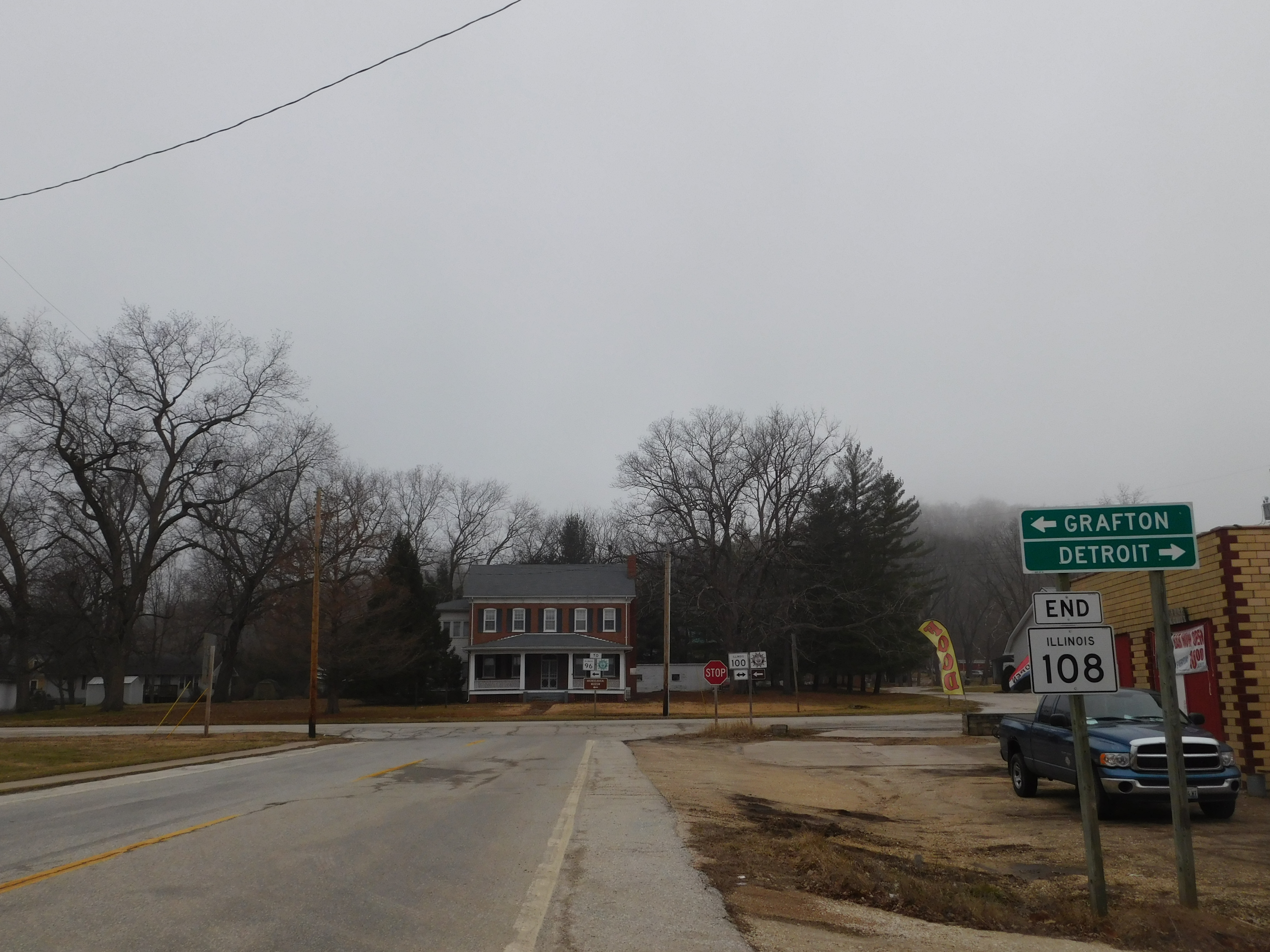
IL 108 in Kampsville, approaching IL 100/IL 96

Illinois 108 is a two-lane undivided surface road for its entire length. In Kampsville, the Kampsville ferry operates across the Illinois River and connects the Kampsville segment of Illinois 108 with its remainder. The ferry is free and runs 24 hours a day, seven days a week. It is one of two permanent ferries still operated by the Illinois Department of Transportation; the other is located in Grafton near the intersection of Illinois 100 and Illinois Route 3.

== History ==
SBI Route 108 was established in 1924. Its routing has not changed since its establishment.

== Major intersections ==
County	Location	mi	km	Destinations	Notes
Calhoun	Kampsville	0.00	0.00	IL 100 / Great River Road Spur south / Illinois River Road to IL 96 – Hardin, Pearl	Western terminus of IL 108
Illinois River		0.2	0.32	Kampsville Ferry Great River Road Spur ends	
Greene	Carrollton	11.4	18.3	US 67 (Fifth Street) – Jerseyville, Jacksonville	
Greene	Rockbridge Township	22.0	35.4	IL 267 – Medora, Jacksonville	
Macoupin	Western Mound Township	31.1	50.1	IL 111 north – Hettick	Begin/end concurrency with IL 111
Macoupin	Western Mound Township	32.0	51.5	IL 111 south – Chesterfield	Begin/end concurrency with IL 111
Macoupin	Carlinville	41.0	66.0	IL 4 north (North Broad Street) – Springfield	Begin/end concurrency with IL 4
Macoupin	Carlinville	41.7	67.1	IL 4 south / Historic US 66 – Gillespie	Begin/end concurrency with IL 4, alternate Route of US 66
Montgomery	Zanesville Township	53.76	86.52	Historic US 66	
Montgomery	Zanesville Township	54.06	87.00	I-55 – East St. Louis, Springfield	Exit 60 (I-55); eastern terminus of IL 108
1.000 mi = 1.609 km; 1.000 km = 0.621 mi: Concurrency terminus
