= Nilwood, Illinois =

- Town
- Location in Macoupin County, Illinois
- Coordinates: 39°23′58″N 89°48′28″W
- Country: United States
- State: Illinois
- County: Macoupin
- Townships: Nilwood, South Otter
- Incorporated: March 9, 1867

Area
  - Total: 0.47 sq mi (1.21 km^{2})
  - Land: 0.47 sq mi (1.21 km^{2})
  - Water: 0 sq mi (0.00 km^{2})
- Elevation: 669 ft (204 m)

Population (2020)
  - Total: 201
  - Density: 431.9/sq mi (166.76/km^{2})
- Time zone: UTC-6 (CST)
  - Summer (DST): UTC-5 (CDT)
- ZIP code: 62672
- Area code: 217
- FIPS code: 17-53039
- GNIS feature ID: 2396817

Nilwood is an incorporated town in Macoupin County, Illinois, United States. The population was 201 at the 2020 census, down from 239 in 2010.

== Geography ==
Illinois Route 4 passes through the north side of town, leading southwest 11 miles (18 km) to Carlinville, the county seat, and northeast 4 miles (6 km) to Girard.

According to the 2021 census gazetteer files, Nilwood has a total area of 0.47 square miles (1.22 km^{2}), all land. The town is drained to the northeast by the headwaters of Shearles Branch, which turns south and flows to Macoupin Creek, a west-flowing tributary of the Illinois River.

== Demographics ==
Historical population
Census	Pop.	Note	%±
1900	529		—
1910	401		−24.2%
1920	449		12.0%
1930	327		−27.2%
1940	325		−0.6%
1950	321		−1.2%
1960	274		−14.6%
1970	245		−10.6%
1980	278		13.5%
1990	238		−14.4%
2000	284		19.3%
2010	239		−15.8%
2020	201		−15.9%
U.S. Decennial Census

As of the 2020 census there were 201 people, 85 households, and 63 families residing in the town. The population density was 432.26 inhabitants per square mile (166.90/km^{2}). There were 96 housing units at an average density of 206.45 per square mile (79.71/km^{2}). The racial makeup of the town was 92.54% White, 0.50% African American, 0.00% Native American, 0.00% Asian, 0.00% Pacific Islander, 0.00% from other races, and 6.97% from two or more races. Hispanic or Latino of any race were 0.00% of the population.

There were 85 households, out of which 21.2% had children under the age of 18 living with them, 63.53% were married couples living together, 10.59% had a female householder with no husband present, and 25.88% were non-families. 21.18% of all households were made up of individuals, and 15.29% had someone living alone who was 65 years of age or older. The average household size was 2.57 and the average family size was 2.21.

The town's age distribution consisted of 11.7% under the age of 18, 1.1% from 18 to 24, 17% from 25 to 44, 34.6% from 45 to 64, and 35.6% who were 65 years of age or older. The median age was 54.5 years. For every 100 females, there were 86.1 males. For every 100 females age 18 and over, there were 71.1 males.

The median income for a household in the town was $47,292, and the median income for a family was $54,250. Males had a median income of $38,750 versus $18,000 for females. The per capita income for the town was $22,410. About 3.2% of families and 8.5% of the population were below the poverty line, including 13.6% of those under age 18 and 7.5% of those age 65 or over.
