= Atwater, Illinois =

- Unincorporated community
- Location within Illinois Location within the United States
- Coordinates: 39°19′58″N 89°43′30″W
- Country: United States
- State: Illinois
- County: Macoupin
- Elevation: 633 ft (193 m)
- Time zone: UTC-6 (Central (CST))
  - Summer (DST): UTC-5 (CDT)
- Area code: 217
- GNIS feature ID: 422421

Atwater is an unincorporated community in Shaws Point Township, Macoupin County, Illinois, United States. Atwater is 3.5 miles (5.6 km) east-southeast of Standard City. Atwater had a post office, which closed on October 12, 2002.
