= Otter Lake (Illinois) =

Lake in Macoupin County, Illinois

- Location within Illinois
- Location: Macoupin County, Illinois
- Coordinates: 39°24′29″N 089°54′42″W
- Type: reservoir
- Primary inflows: Otter Creek
- Primary outflows: Otter Creek
- Basin countries: United States
- Surface area: 765 acres (310 ha)
- Surface elevation: 620 ft (189 m)

Otter Lake is a 765 acres (310 ha) reservoir in Macoupin County, Illinois. It is located 6 miles (9.7 km) west of Girard. The reservoir is named after Otter Creek, a tributary of Macoupin Creek and the Illinois River.

Otter Creek was dammed to provide flood control, water-based recreation, and a source of clean water for North Otter and South Otter Townships within Macoupin County. Recreation centers on fishing opportunities, with the lake managed for striped bass, crappie, and muskie.

There is a strictly-enforced power limit on the lake, with motors banned if stronger than 115 horsepower. The lake is troubled by sedimentation, with riprap applied to many patches of shoreline to reduce (but not eliminate) erosion of silt into the lake. Historically, quantities of atrazine have entered the lake from nearby farm fields to which the chemical is applied.
