= Chesterfield Township =

Chesterfield Township may refer to the following places in the United States:

- Chesterfield Township, Macoupin County, Illinois
- Chesterfield Township, Michigan
- Chesterfield Township, New Jersey
- Chesterfield Township, Ohio
