= Bird Township =

Bird Township may refer to the following townships in the United States:

- Bird Township, Conway County, Arkansas, Conway County, Arkansas
- Bird Township, Jackson County, Arkansas, Jackson County, Arkansas
- Bird Township, Macoupin County, Illinois
