= Frank W. Burton =

American judge and politician (1857–1934)

Frank Webster Burton (October 8, 1857 – November 22, 1934) was an American judge and politician.

Burton wa born in Bunker Hill, Illinois. He graduated from Blackburn College in Carlinville, Illinois and was admitted to the Illinois bar in 1879. He lived with his wife in Carlinville, Illinois and practiced law. He served as state's attorney for Macoupin County, Illinois and as city attorney for Carlinville, Illinois. Burton served on the board of education and was the president of the board of education. Burton served in the Illinois House of Representatives in 1903 and 1904 and was a Democrat. He also served in the Illinois Senate from 1905 to 1913. Burton served as an Illinois Circuit Court judge from 1914 to 1933, He died at a hospital in Carlinville, Illinois.
