= Barr Township =

Barr Township may refer to:

- Barr Township, Macoupin County, Illinois
- Barr Township, Daviess County, Indiana
- Barr Township, Cambria County, Pennsylvania
