= Dorchester, Illinois =

- Village
- Location in Macoupin County, Illinois
- Coordinates: 39°05′09″N 89°53′16″W
- Country: United States
- State: Illinois
- County: Macoupin
- Townships: Dorchester, Gillespie

Area
  - Total: 0.72 sq mi (1.87 km^{2})
  - Land: 0.72 sq mi (1.87 km^{2})
  - Water: 0 sq mi (0.00 km^{2})
- Elevation: 656 ft (200 m)

Population (2020)
  - Total: 133
  - Density: 184.3/sq mi (71.15/km^{2})
- Time zone: UTC-6 (CST)
  - Summer (DST): UTC-5 (CDT)
- ZIP Code: 62033
- Area code: 618
- FIPS code: 17-20370
- GNIS ID: 2398740

Dorchester is a village in Macoupin County, Illinois, United States. The population was 133 at the 2020 census.

== Geography ==
Dorchester is located in southern Macoupin County 2 miles (3 km) northwest of Wilsonville; 5 miles (8 km) southwest of Gillespie, with which it shares a ZIP Code (62033) and 15 miles (24 km) south of Carlinville, the Macoupin county seat.

According to the 2021 census gazetteer files, Dorchester has a total area of 0.72 square miles (1.86 km^{2}), all land. The village drains eastward to the West Fork of Cahokia Creek, which leads south, then west, to the Mississippi River near St. Louis.

== Demographics ==
Historical population
| Census | Pop. | Note | %± |
|---|---|---|---|
| 1880 | 69 | | — |
| 1890 | 104 | | 50.7% |
| 1910 | 102 | | — |
| 1920 | 179 | | 75.5% |
| 1930 | 144 | | −19.6% |
| 1940 | 185 | | 28.5% |
| 1950 | 162 | | −12.4% |
| 1960 | 161 | | −0.6% |
| 1970 | 170 | | 5.6% |
| 1980 | 155 | | −8.8% |
| 1990 | 145 | | −6.5% |
| 2000 | 142 | | −2.1% |
| 2010 | 151 | | 6.3% |
| 2020 | 133 | | −11.9% |
U.S. Decennial Census

As of the 2020 census there were 133 people, 50 households, and 40 families residing in the village. The population density was 184.21 inhabitants per square mile (71.12/km^{2}). There were 59 housing units at an average density of 81.72 per square mile (31.55/km^{2}). The racial makeup of the village was 94.74% White, 0.00% African American, 0.75% Native American, 0.00% Asian, 0.00% Pacific Islander, 0.00% from other races, and 4.51% from two or more races. Hispanic or Latino of any race were 1.50% of the population.

There were 50 households, out of which 38.0% had children under the age of 18 living with them, 76.00% were married couples living together, 2.00% had a female householder with no husband present, and 20.00% were non-families. 16.00% of all households were made up of individuals, and 2.00% had someone living alone who was 65 years of age or older. The average household size was 3.50 and the average family size was 3.02.

The village's age distribution consisted of 35.1% under the age of 18, 0.0% from 18 to 24, 19.3% from 25 to 44, 31.1% from 45 to 64, and 14.6% who were 65 years of age or older. The median age was 37.5 years. For every 100 females, there were 115.7 males. For every 100 females age 18 and over, there were 108.5 males.

The median income for a household in the village was $78,750, and the median income for a family was $112,857. Males had a median income of $47,105 versus $65,089 for females. The per capita income for the village was $30,755. About 0.0% of families and 1.3% of the population were below the poverty line, including 0.0% of those under age 18 and 0.0% of those age 65 or over.
