= Kyle Dixon (American football) =

American football player (born 2000)

No. 83 – New England Patriots
- Position: Wide receiver
- Roster status: Practice squad

Personal information
- Born: September 14, 2000 (age 26); Carlinville, Illinois, U.S.
- Listed height: 6 ft 2 in (1.88 m)
- Listed weight: 220 lb (100 kg)

Career information
- High school: Carlinville (Carlinville, Illinois)
- College: Culver–Stockton (2024–2025)
- NFL draft: 2026: undrafted

Career history
- New England Patriots (2026–present)*
- * Offseason or practice squad member only

Awards and highlights
- 2× First-team All-HAAC (2024, 2025)
- Stats at Pro Football Reference

Kyle Dixon (born September 14, 2000) is an American football wide receiver for the New England Patriots of the National Football League (NFL). He played college football at Culver–Stockton.

== Early life ==
Dixon grew up in Carlinville, Illinois and attended Carlinville High School.

== College career ==
Dixon originally played college baseball at Southern Illinois for two years before transferring to SIU Edwardsville. He transferred a second time to Georgia Gwinnett College, where he played one season before deciding to end his baseball career to pursue football.

Dixon enrolled at Culver–Stockton College, an NAIA school, to play college football. He was named first-team All-Heart of America Athletic Conference (HAAC) in his first season with the Wildcats after catching 60 passes for 1,112 yards and 12 touchdowns. Dixon repeated as a first-team All-HAAC selection after finishing his senior season with 83 receptions for 1,282 yards and 12 touchdowns.

== Professional career ==
Pre-draft measurables
Height	Weight	Arm length	Hand span	Wingspan	40-yard dash	10-yard split	20-yard split	20-yard shuttle	Three-cone drill	Vertical jump	Broad jump	Bench press
6 ft 2 1/2 in (1.89 m)	220 lb (100 kg)	31 7/8 in (0.81 m)	9 in (0.23 m)	6 ft 6 in (1.98 m)	4.51 s	1.53 s	2.58 s	4.51 s	7.05 s	40.5 in (1.03 m)	10 ft 11 in (3.33 m)	15 reps
All values from Pro Day

Dixon was signed by the New England Patriots as an undrafted free agent on April 25, 2026. On August 30, Dixon was waived by the Patriots as a part of final roster cuts; he was re–signed to the team's practice squad the next day.
