= Barr, Macoupin County, Illinois =

Barr, Illinois
- Unincorporated community
- Location within Illinois Location within the United States
- Coordinates: 39°24′17″N 90°06′15″W
- Country: United States
- State: Illinois
- County: Macoupin
- Elevation: 666 ft (203 m)
- Time zone: UTC-6 (Central (CST))
  - Summer (DST): UTC-5 (CDT)
- Area code: 217
- GNIS feature ID: 422436

Barr is an unincorporated community in Macoupin County, Illinois, United States. Barr is 6 miles (9.7 km) southwest of Palmyra.

An post office was established on August 8, 1850.
