= Polk Township, Macoupin County, Illinois =

Polk Township
- Township

- Location of Illinois in the United States
- Coordinates: 39°13′N 89°59′W
- Country: United States
- State: Illinois
- County: Macoupin
- Settled: November 1, 1870

Area
  - Total: 36.19 sq mi (93.7 km^{2})
  - Land: 35.95 sq mi (93.1 km^{2})
  - Water: 0.24 sq mi (0.62 km^{2}) 0.65%
- Elevation: 607 ft (185 m)

Population (2020)
  - Total: 566
  - Density: 15.7/sq mi (6.08/km^{2})
- Time zone: UTC-6 (CST)
  - Summer (DST): UTC-5 (CDT)
- FIPS code: 17-117-60924

Polk Township (T9N R8W) is located in Macoupin County, Illinois, United States. As of the 2020 census, its population was 566 and it contained 290 housing units.

== Geography ==
According to the 2021 census gazetteer files, Polk Township has a total area of 36.19 square miles (93.73 km^{2}), of which 35.95 square miles (93.11 km^{2}) (or 99.35%) is land and 0.24 square miles (0.62 km^{2}) (or 0.65%) is water.

== Demographics ==
As of the 2020 census there were 566 people, 250 households, and 210 families residing in the township. The population density was 15.64 inhabitants per square mile (6.04/km^{2}). There were 290 housing units at an average density of 8.01 per square mile (3.09/km^{2}). The racial makeup of the township was 96.11% White, 0.18% African American, 0.35% Native American, 0.00% Asian, 0.00% Pacific Islander, 0.18% from other races, and 3.18% from two or more races. Hispanic or Latino of any race were 0.88% of the population.

There were 250 households, out of which 24.00% had children under the age of 18 living with them, 71.20% were married couples living together, 4.00% had a female householder with no spouse present, and 16.00% were non-families. 13.60% of all households were made up of individuals, and 10.00% had someone living alone who was 65 years of age or older. The average household size was 2.37 and the average family size was 2.52.

According to the 2020 American Community Survey, township's age distribution consisted of 14.5% under the age of 18, 9.9% from 18 to 24, 9.7% from 25 to 44, 45.2% from 45 to 64, and 20.6% who were 65 years of age or older. The median age was 53.4 years. For every 100 females, there were 105.8 males. For every 100 females age 18 and over, there were 100.4 males.

The median income for a household in the township was $83,229, and the median income for a family was $84,271. Males had a median income of $58,500 versus $30,972 for females. The per capita income for the township was $34,412. About 4.8% of families and 11.1% of the population were below the poverty line, including 31.4% of those under age 18 and 0.0% of those age 65 or over.

Historical population
Census	Pop.	Note	%±
2000	514		—
2010	563		9.5%
2020	566		0.5%
U.S. Decennial Census

== Adjacent townships ==
- Bird Township (north)
- Carlinville Township (northeast)
- Brushy Mound Township (east)
- Gillespie Township (southeast)
- Hillyard Township (south)
- Shipman Township (southwest)
- Chesterfield Township (west)
- Western Mound Township (northwest)
