= Womac, Illinois =

- Unincorporated community
- Location within Illinois Location within the United States
- Coordinates: 39°16′17″N 89°47′17″W
- Country: United States
- State: Illinois
- County: Macoupin
- Elevation: 640 ft (200 m)
- Time zone: UTC-6 (Central (CST))
  - Summer (DST): UTC-5 (CDT)
- Area code: 217
- GNIS feature ID: 423330

Womac is an unincorporated community in Macoupin County, in the U.S. state of Illinois.

== History ==
A post office called Womac was established in 1888, and remained in operation until it was discontinued in 1910. The community was named for John J. Womac, a merchant and local landowner.
