= Palmyra, Illinois =

- Village
- Location in Macoupin County, Illinois
- Coordinates: 39°26′04″N 89°59′55″W
- Country: United States
- State: Illinois
- County: Macoupin
- Townships: North Palmyra; South Palmyra

Area
  - Total: 1.00 sq mi (2.59 km^{2})
  - Land: 1.00 sq mi (2.59 km^{2})
  - Water: 0 sq mi (0.00 km^{2})
- Elevation: 676 ft (206 m)

Population (2020)
  - Total: 605
  - Density: 605.6/sq mi (233.84/km^{2})
- Time zone: UTC-6 (CST)
  - Summer (DST): UTC-5 (CDT)
- ZIP code: 62674
- Area code: 217
- FIPS code: 17-57329
- GNIS feature ID: 2399614

Palmyra is a village in Macoupin County, Illinois, United States. The population was 605 at the 2020 census, down from 698 in 2010.

== History ==
The first home in the Palmyra area was a log cabin built in 1835 by William Owens.

The town originally was named "Newburg", then changed to "Cummington" and finally was platted as Palmyra in 1855.

Palmyra High School was established in 1892. It closed in 1948 as it combined with three other small towns.

== Geography ==
Palmyra is located in northwestern Macoupin County. Illinois Route 111 passes through the village as Main Street, leading north 11 miles (18 km) to Waverly and southwest 22 miles (35 km) to Medora. Carlinville, the Macoupin county seat, is 16 miles (26 km) to the southeast via local roads.

According to the 2021 census gazetteer files, Palmyra has a total area of 1.00 square mile (2.59 km^{2}), all land. Solomon Creek, part of the Macoupin Creek watershed leading to the Illinois River, flows southward along the western border of the village.

=== Landmarks ===
==== Palmyra Opera House ====
In November 1902, Clarence Grimett bought a half interest in land and a building at the corner of Main and State streets in Palmyra, where Joseph Waters later joined him in operating a general store. In about 1905, they built a basement oven, hired a baker, and began selling baked goods. After they opened a second-floor theater for presentation of plays and touring performers, the entire establishment became known as the Palmyra Opera House. After a long history as the center of town activity and many years of ownership by Joyce and Rosco Bettis, the Palmyra Opera House was re-opened as a restaurant in November 1999 by Rick Creasy.

==== Palmyra Castle ====
Palmyra Castle is a 9,000-square-foot (840 m^{2}) residence in a park-like setting of 40 acres (16 ha), designed to resemble a German castle.

== Demographics ==
Historical population
| Census | Pop. | Note | %± |
|---|---|---|---|
| 1880 | 222 | | — |
| 1890 | 505 | | 127.5% |
| 1900 | 813 | | 61.0% |
| 1910 | 873 | | 7.4% |
| 1920 | 835 | | −4.4% |
| 1930 | 760 | | −9.0% |
| 1940 | 824 | | 8.4% |
| 1950 | 746 | | −9.5% |
| 1960 | 811 | | 8.7% |
| 1970 | 776 | | −4.3% |
| 1980 | 864 | | 11.3% |
| 1990 | 722 | | −16.4% |
| 2000 | 733 | | 1.5% |
| 2010 | 698 | | −4.8% |
| 2020 | 605 | | −13.3% |
U.S. Decennial Census

As of the 2020 census there were 605 people, 303 households, and 187 families residing in the village. The population density was 605.61 inhabitants per square mile (233.83/km^{2}). There were 311 housing units at an average density of 311.31 per square mile (120.20/km^{2}). The racial makeup of the village was 94.88% White, 0.17% African American, 1.16% Native American, 0.00% Asian, 0.00% Pacific Islander, 0.17% from other races, and 3.64% from two or more races. Hispanic or Latino of any race were 1.49% of the population.

There were 303 households, out of which 29.4% had children under the age of 18 living with them, 45.21% were married couples living together, 15.18% had a female householder with no husband present, and 38.28% were non-families. 31.02% of all households were made up of individuals, and 9.90% had someone living alone who was 65 years of age or older. The average household size was 2.62 and the average family size was 2.14.

The village's age distribution consisted of 24.3% under the age of 18, 2.5% from 18 to 24, 24.4% from 25 to 44, 26.8% from 45 to 64, and 21.9% who were 65 years of age or older. The median age was 43.7 years. For every 100 females, there were 81.2 males. For every 100 females age 18 and over, there were 80.8 males.

The median income for a household in the village was $31,563, and the median income for a family was $41,875. Males had a median income of $26,875 versus $28,864 for females. The per capita income for the village was $21,406. About 18.2% of families and 24.0% of the population were below the poverty line, including 30.1% of those under age 18 and 5.6% of those age 65 or over.

== Notable people ==
- Richard Grace, justice of the North Dakota Supreme Court
- Joe McManus, pitcher for the Cincinnati Reds
- Earle Benjamin Searcy, Illinois state legislator
