= WLCA =

Radio station at Lewis and Clark Community College in Godfrey, Illinois

Coordinates: 38.9492°N 90.1965°W

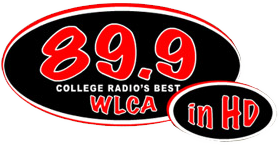
- Godfrey, Illinois; United States
- Broadcast area: Greater St. Louis / St. Louis Metro-East
- Frequency: 89.9 MHz
- Branding: 89.9

Programming
- Format: Alternative rock/College Radio
- Subchannels: HD2: "Hit Radio"

Ownership
- Owner: Lewis and Clark Community College

History
- First air date: April 30, 1974
- Call sign meaning: Lewis and Clark

Technical information
- Licensing authority: FCC
- Class: A
- ERP: 1,500 watts
- HAAT: 120 meters (390 ft)

Links
- Public license information: Public file; LMS
- Website: wlcafm.com

WLCA (89.9 FM) is a student-run radio station owned and operated by Lewis and Clark Community College in Godfrey, Illinois. It currently plays an alternative rock/college radio format. It can be heard in the northern St. Louis, Missouri market area, as well as the city of St. Louis and parts of the Metro-East area.

== Awards ==
WLCA was the recipient of the 2001 and 2002 Achievement In Radio Award for the best student-run radio station in the St. Louis market.
