= Medora, Illinois =

- Village
- Location in Macoupin County, Illinois
- Coordinates: 39°10′35″N 90°08′29″W
- Country: United States
- State: Illinois
- County: Macoupin
- Townships: Chesterfield, Shipman

Area
  - Total: 0.38 sq mi (0.98 km^{2})
  - Land: 0.38 sq mi (0.98 km^{2})
  - Water: 0 sq mi (0.00 km^{2})
- Elevation: 607 ft (185 m)

Population (2020)
  - Total: 379
  - Density: 997.1/sq mi (384.98/km^{2})
- Time zone: UTC-6 (CST)
  - Summer (DST): UTC-5 (CDT)
- ZIP code: 62063
- Area code: 618
- FIPS code: 17-48138
- GNIS feature ID: 2399305

Medora is a village in Macoupin County, Illinois, United States. The population was 379 at the 2020 census, down from 419 in 2010.

== Geography ==
Medora is located along the western edge of Macoupin County. The village's western border is the Jersey County line. Illinois Routes 111 and 267 pass through the east side of the village. Together the highways lead south 9 miles (14 km) to Brighton. Route 267 leads north 13 miles (21 km) to Greenfield, while Route 111 leads northeast 8 miles (13 km) to Chesterfield. Carlinville, the Macoupin county seat, is 20 miles (32 km) to the northeast via Routes 111 and 108.

According to the 2021 census gazetteer files, Medora has a total area of 0.38 square miles (0.98 km^{2}), all land. The village drains northwest to a tributary of Macoupin Creek, part of the Illinois River watershed.

== Demographics ==
Historical population
Census	Pop.	Note	%±
1880	397		—
1890	470		18.4%
1900	449		−4.5%
1910	444		−1.1%
1920	483		8.8%
1930	367		−24.0%
1940	438		19.3%
1950	432		−1.4%
1960	447		3.5%
1970	505		13.0%
1980	532		5.3%
1990	420		−21.1%
2000	501		19.3%
2010	419		−16.4%
2020	379		−9.5%
U.S. Decennial Census

As of the 2020 census there were 379 people, 138 households, and 102 families residing in the village. The population density was 997.37 inhabitants per square mile (385.09/km^{2}). There were 162 housing units at an average density of 426.32 per square mile (164.60/km^{2}). The racial makeup of the village was 91.03% White, 0.53% African American, 0.79% Native American, 0.00% Asian, 0.00% Pacific Islander, 0.26% from other races, and 7.39% from two or more races. Hispanic or Latino of any race were 2.11% of the population.

There were 138 households, out of which 32.6% had children under the age of 18 living with them, 61.59% were married couples living together, 6.52% had a female householder with no husband present, and 26.09% were non-families. 23.19% of all households were made up of individuals, and 7.97% had someone living alone who was 65 years of age or older. The average household size was 2.72 and the average family size was 2.34.

The village's age distribution consisted of 19.2% under the age of 18, 5.0% from 18 to 24, 32.8% from 25 to 44, 25.4% from 45 to 64, and 17.6% who were 65 years of age or older. The median age was 43.1 years. For every 100 females, there were 116.8 males. For every 100 females age 18 and over, there were 108.8 males.

The median income for a household in the village was $56,250, and the median income for a family was $76,250. Males had a median income of $53,333 versus $24,943 for females. The per capita income for the village was $27,228. About 18.6% of families and 20.1% of the population were below the poverty line, including 21.0% of those under age 18 and 0.0% of those age 65 or over.
