= Hillyard Township, Macoupin County, Illinois =

Hillyard Township
- Township

- Location of Illinois in the United States
- Coordinates: 39°8′N 89°58′W
- Country: United States
- State: Illinois
- County: Macoupin
- Settled: November 1, 1870

Area
  - Total: 36.17 sq mi (93.7 km^{2})
  - Land: 36.09 sq mi (93.5 km^{2})
  - Water: 0.08 sq mi (0.21 km^{2}) 0.22%
- Elevation: 627 ft (191 m)

Population (2020)
  - Total: 628
  - Density: 17.4/sq mi (6.72/km^{2})
- Time zone: UTC-6 (CST)
  - Summer (DST): UTC-5 (CDT)
- FIPS code: 17-117-35242

Hillyard Township (T8N R8W) is located in Macoupin County, Illinois, United States. As of the 2020 census, its population was 628 and it contained 314 housing units.

== Geography ==
According to the 2021 census gazetteer files, Hillyard Township has a total area of 36.17 square miles (93.68 km^{2}), of which 36.09 square miles (93.47 km^{2}) (or 99.78%) is land and 0.08 square miles (0.21 km^{2}) (or 0.22%) is water.

== Demographics ==
As of the 2020 census there were 628 people, 330 households, and 199 families residing in the township. The population density was 17.36 inhabitants per square mile (6.70/km^{2}). There were 314 housing units at an average density of 8.68 per square mile (3.35/km^{2}). The racial makeup of the township was 79.46% White, 13.69% African American, 1.27% Native American, 0.00% Asian, 0.00% Pacific Islander, 0.16% from other races, and 5.41% from two or more races. Hispanic or Latino of any race were 0.96% of the population.

There were 330 households, out of which 31.80% had children under the age of 18 living with them, 55.45% were married couples living together, 1.21% had a female householder with no spouse present, and 39.70% were non-families. 35.50% of all households were made up of individuals, and 13.00% had someone living alone who was 65 years of age or older. The average household size was 2.55 and the average family size was 3.37.

According to the 2020 American Community Survey, township's age distribution consisted of 29.8% under the age of 18, 5.1% from 18 to 24, 18% from 25 to 44, 32.6% from 45 to 64, and 14.5% who were 65 years of age or older. The median age was 41.8 years. For every 100 females, there were 101.3 males. For every 100 females age 18 and over, there were 98.8 males.

The median income for a household in the township was $32,206, and the median income for a family was $85,417. Males had a median income of $57,784 versus $51,429 for females. The per capita income for the township was $23,404. About 11.1% of families and 24.1% of the population were below the poverty line, including 19.0% of those under age 18 and 33.6% of those age 65 or over.

Historical population
Census	Pop.	Note	%±
2000	733		—
2010	686		−6.4%
2020	628		−8.5%
U.S. Decennial Census

== Adjacent townships ==
- Polk Township (north)
- Brushy Mound Township (northeast)
- Gillespie Township (east)
- Dorchester Township (southeast)
- Bunker Hill Township (south)
- Brighton Township (southwest)
- Shipman Township (west)
- Chesterfield Township (northwest)
