= Louis P. Daley =

American politician

Louis P. Daley (June 17, 1868–January 11, 1930) was an American farmer and politician.

Daley was born in Carlinville, Illinois. He went to St. Mary's Academy in Carlinville and to University of Notre Dame. He was a farmer and raised livestock. Daley served in the Illinois House of Representatives from 1909 to 1913 and was a Democrat. He died in Hollywood, Los Angeles, California.
