= Anderson, Macoupin County, Illinois =

Anderson, Illinois
- Unincorporated community
- Location within Illinois Location within the United States
- Coordinates: 39°20′38″N 89°50′42″W
- Country: United States
- State: Illinois
- County: Macoupin
- Elevation: 640 ft (200 m)
- Time zone: UTC-6 (Central (CST))
  - Summer (DST): UTC-5 (CDT)
- Area code: 217
- GNIS feature ID: 422409

Anderson is an unincorporated community in Macoupin County, Illinois, United States.
