= Standard City, Illinois =

- Village
- Location in Macoupin County, Illinois
- Coordinates: 39°21′01″N 89°47′01″W
- Country: United States
- State: Illinois
- County: Macoupin
- Townships: Nilwood, Shaws Point

Area
  - Total: 0.64 sq mi (1.66 km^{2})
  - Land: 0.64 sq mi (1.65 km^{2})
  - Water: 0.0039 sq mi (0.01 km^{2})
- Elevation: 627 ft (191 m)

Population (2020)
  - Total: 135
  - Density: 212.2/sq mi (81.94/km^{2})
- Time zone: UTC-6 (CST)
  - Summer (DST): UTC-5 (CDT)
- ZIP code: 62640
- Area code: 217
- FIPS code: 17-72234
- GNIS feature ID: 2399885

Standard City is a village in Macoupin County, Illinois, United States. The population was 135 at the 2020 census.

== Geography ==
Standard City is located in northeastern Macoupin County. It is 9 miles (14 km) northeast of Carlinville, the county seat, and 13 miles (21 km) west of Raymond.

According to the 2021 census gazetteer files, Standard City has a total area of 0.64 square miles (1.66 km^{2}), of which 0.64 square miles (1.66 km^{2}) (or 99.53%) is land and 0.00 square miles (0.00 km^{2}) (or 0.47%) is water.

== Demographics ==
Historical population
Census	Pop.	Note	%±
1940	207		—
1950	192		−7.2%
1960	182		−5.2%
1970	139		−23.6%
1980	148		6.5%
1990	128		−13.5%
2000	138		7.8%
2010	152		10.1%
2020	135		−11.2%
U.S. Decennial Census

As of the 2020 census there were 135 people, 71 households, and 57 families residing in the village. The population density was 211.27 inhabitants per square mile (81.57/km^{2}). There were 58 housing units at an average density of 90.77 per square mile (35.05/km^{2}). The racial makeup of the village was 94.81% White, 0.00% African American, 1.48% Native American, 1.48% Asian, 0.00% Pacific Islander, 0.74% from other races, and 1.48% from two or more races. Hispanic or Latino of any race were 0.74% of the population.

There were 71 households, out of which 40.8% had children under the age of 18 living with them, 78.87% were married couples living together, 0.00% had a female householder with no husband present, and 19.72% were non-families. 2.82% of all households were made up of individuals, and 2.82% had someone living alone who was 65 years of age or older. The average household size was 3.23 and the average family size was 3.08.

The village's age distribution consisted of 27.4% under the age of 18, 8.2% from 18 to 24, 18.7% from 25 to 44, 27.9% from 45 to 64, and 17.8% who were 65 years of age or older. The median age was 40.8 years. For every 100 females, there were 93.8 males. For every 100 females age 18 and over, there were 109.2 males.

The median income for a household in the village was $75,938, and the median income for a family was $60,417. Males had a median income of $44,107 versus $63,889 for females. The per capita income for the village was $24,139. About 3.5% of families and 9.7% of the population were below the poverty line, including 5.2% of those under age 18 and 0.0% of those age 65 or over.
