= Western Mound Township, Macoupin County, Illinois =

Western Mound Township
- Township

- Location of Illinois in the United States
- Coordinates: 39°18′N 90°5′W
- Country: United States
- State: Illinois
- County: Macoupin
- Settled: November 1, 1870

Area
  - Total: 35.15 sq mi (91.0 km^{2})
  - Land: 35.03 sq mi (90.7 km^{2})
  - Water: 0.12 sq mi (0.31 km^{2}) 0.35%
- Elevation: 499 ft (152 m)

Population (2020)
  - Total: 263
  - Density: 7.51/sq mi (2.90/km^{2})
- Time zone: UTC-6 (CST)
  - Summer (DST): UTC-5 (CDT)
- FIPS code: 17-117-80229

Western Mound Township (T10N R9W) is located in Macoupin County, Illinois, United States. As of the 2020 census, its population was 263 and it contained 120 housing units.

== Geography ==
According to the 2021 census gazetteer files, Western Mound Township has a total area of 35.15 square miles (91.04 km^{2}), of which 35.03 square miles (90.73 km^{2}) (or 99.65%) is land and 0.12 square miles (0.31 km^{2}) (or 0.35%) is water.

== Demographics ==
As of the 2020 census there were 263 people, 131 households, and 122 families residing in the township. The population density was 7.48 inhabitants per square mile (2.89/km^{2}). There were 120 housing units at an average density of 3.41 per square mile (1.32/km^{2}). The racial makeup of the township was 93.92% White, 0.38% African American, 0.00% Native American, 0.00% Asian, 0.00% Pacific Islander, 0.00% from other races, and 5.70% from two or more races. Hispanic or Latino of any race were 0.00% of the population.

There were 131 households, out of which 21.40% had children under the age of 18 living with them, 90.08% were married couples living together, 0.00% had a female householder with no spouse present, and 6.87% were non-families. 6.90% of all households were made up of individuals, and 6.90% had someone living alone who was 65 years of age or older. The average household size was 2.37 and the average family size was 2.47.

According to the 2020 American Community Survey, township's age distribution consisted of 18.7% under the age of 18, 0.0% from 18 to 24, 8% from 25 to 44, 31.6% from 45 to 64, and 41.6% who were 65 years of age or older. The median age was 57.7 years. For every 100 females, there were 108.7 males. For every 100 females age 18 and over, there were 108.2 males.

The median income for a household in the township was $145,375, and the median income for a family was $146,500. Males had a median income of $70,500 versus $50,833 for females. The per capita income for the township was $50,785. About 6.6% of families and 5.2% of the population were below the poverty line, including 0.0% of those under age 18 and 12.4% of those age 65 or over.

Historical population
Census	Pop.	Note	%±
2000	302		—
2010	272		−9.9%
2020	263		−3.3%
U.S. Decennial Census

== Adjacent townships ==
- Barr Township (north)
- South Palmyra Township (northeast)
- Bird Township (east)
- Polk Township (southeast)
- Chesterfield Township (south)
- Ruyle Township, Jersey County (southwest)
- Rockbridge Township, Greene County (west)
- Rubicon Township, Greene County (northwest)
