= Carlinville Township, Macoupin County, Illinois =

Carlinville Township
- Township

- Location of Illinois in the United States
- Coordinates: 39°18′N 89°52′W
- Country: United States
- State: Illinois
- County: Macoupin
- Settled: November 1, 1870

Area
  - Total: 35.36 sq mi (91.6 km^{2})
  - Land: 35.36 sq mi (91.6 km^{2})
  - Water: 0 sq mi (0 km^{2}) 0%
- Elevation: 630 ft (190 m)

Population (2020)
  - Total: 6,448
  - Density: 182.4/sq mi (70.41/km^{2})
- Time zone: UTC-6 (CST)
  - Summer (DST): UTC-5 (CDT)
- FIPS code: 17-117-11209

Carlinville Township (T10N R7W) is located in Macoupin County, Illinois, United States. As of the 2020 census, its population was 6,448 and it contained 2,899 housing units.

== Geography ==
According to the 2021 census gazetteer files, Carlinville Township has a total area of 35.36 square miles (91.58 km^{2}), all land.

== Demographics ==
As of the 2020 census there were 6,448 people, 2,412 households, and 1,569 families residing in the township. The population density was 182.36 inhabitants per square mile (70.41/km^{2}). There were 2,899 housing units at an average density of 81.99 per square mile (31.66/km^{2}). The racial makeup of the township was 91.08% White, 1.97% African American, 0.31% Native American, 0.84% Asian, 0.00% Pacific Islander, 0.48% from other races, and 5.32% from two or more races. Hispanic or Latino of any race were 1.26% of the population.

There were 2,412 households, out of which 26.80% had children under the age of 18 living with them, 48.05% were married couples living together, 10.16% had a female householder with no spouse present, and 34.95% were non-families. 30.90% of all households were made up of individuals, and 20.40% had someone living alone who was 65 years of age or older. The average household size was 2.37 and the average family size was 2.93.

According to the 2020 American Community Survey, township's age distribution consisted of 21.1% under the age of 18, 14.4% from 18 to 24, 20.5% from 25 to 44, 20.3% from 45 to 64, and 23.9% who were 65 years of age or older. The median age was 38.0 years. For every 100 females, there were 92.2 males. For every 100 females age 18 and over, there were 87.7 males.

The median income for a household in the township was $53,618, and the median income for a family was $73,715. Males had a median income of $43,311 versus $24,121 for females. The per capita income for the township was $27,288. About 11.9% of families and 18.4% of the population were below the poverty line, including 29.3% of those under age 18 and 3.7% of those age 65 or over.

Historical population
Census	Pop.	Note	%±
2000	6,910		—
2010	6,665		−3.5%
2020	6,448		−3.3%
U.S. Decennial Census

== Adjacent townships ==
- South Otter Township (north)
- Nilwood Township (northeast)
- Shaws Point Township (east)
- Honey Point Township (southeast)
- Brushy Mound Township (south)
- Polk Township (southwest)
- Bird Township (west)
- South Palmyra Township (northwest)
