= South Otter Township, Macoupin County, Illinois =

South Otter Township
- Township

- Location of Illinois in the United States
- Coordinates: 39°23′N 89°52′W
- Country: United States
- State: Illinois
- County: Macoupin
- Settled: November 1, 1870

Area
  - Total: 36.39 sq mi (94.2 km^{2})
  - Land: 35.75 sq mi (92.6 km^{2})
  - Water: 0.64 sq mi (1.7 km^{2}) 1.75%
- Elevation: 659 ft (201 m)

Population (2020)
  - Total: 440
  - Density: 12/sq mi (4.8/km^{2})
- Time zone: UTC-6 (CST)
  - Summer (DST): UTC-5 (CDT)
- FIPS code: 17-117-71123

South Otter Township (T11N R7W) is located in Macoupin County, Illinois, United States. As of the 2020 census, its population was 440 and it contained 196 housing units.

== Geography ==
According to the 2021 census gazetteer files, South Otter Township has a total area of 36.39 square miles (94.25 km^{2}), of which 35.75 square miles (92.59 km^{2}) (or 98.25%) is land and 0.64 square miles (1.66 km^{2}) (or 1.75%) is water.

== Demographics ==
As of the 2020 census there were 440 people, 110 households, and 101 families residing in the township. The population density was 12.09 inhabitants per square mile (4.67/km^{2}). There were 196 housing units at an average density of 5.39 per square mile (2.08/km^{2}). The racial makeup of the township was 95.00% White, 0.00% African American, 0.00% Native American, 1.14% Asian, 0.00% Pacific Islander, 0.23% from other races, and 3.64% from two or more races. Hispanic or Latino of any race were 0.23% of the population.

There were 110 households, out of which 11.80% had children under the age of 18 living with them, 90.91% were married couples living together, 0.91% had a female householder with no spouse present, and 8.18% were non-families. 8.20% of all households were made up of individuals, and 0.00% had someone living alone who was 65 years of age or older. The average household size was 2.27 and the average family size was 2.39.

According to the 2020 American Community Survey, township's age distribution consisted of 13.2% under the age of 18, 4.0% from 18 to 24, 11.6% from 25 to 44, 38% from 45 to 64, and 33.2% who were 65 years of age or older. The median age was 55.5 years. For every 100 females, there were 103.7 males. For every 100 females age 18 and over, there were 103.5 males.

The median income for a household in the township was $136,250, and the median income for a family was $147,250. Males had a median income of $48,021 versus $51,477 for females. The per capita income for the township was $63,749. About 1.0% of families and 5.2% of the population were below the poverty line, including 9.1% of those under age 18 and 0.0% of those age 65 or over.

Historical population
Census	Pop.	Note	%±
2000	395		—
2010	465		17.7%
2020	440		−5.4%
U.S. Decennial Census

== Adjacent townships ==
- North Otter Township (north)
- Girard Township (northeast)
- Nilwood Township (east)
- Shaws Point Township (southeast)
- Carlinville Township (south)
- Bird Township (southwest)
- South Palmyra Township (west)
- North Palmyra Township (northwest)
