= Lake Ka-ho, Illinois =

- Village
- Location in Macoupin County, Illinois
- Coordinates: 39°05′55″N 89°44′54″W
- Country: United States
- State: Illinois
- County: Macoupin
- Township: Cahokia

Area
  - Total: 0.32 sq mi (0.84 km^{2})
  - Land: 0.28 sq mi (0.73 km^{2})
  - Water: 0.039 sq mi (0.10 km^{2})
- Elevation: 656 ft (200 m)

Population (2020)
  - Total: 194
  - Density: 684/sq mi (264.2/km^{2})
- Time zone: UTC-6 (Central (CST))
  - Summer (DST): UTC-5 (CDT)
- ZIP Code: 62069 (Mount Olive)
- Area code: 217
- FIPS code: 17-41214
- GNIS feature ID: 2398380

Lake Ka-ho is a village in Cahokia Township, Macoupin County, Illinois, United States. It was incorporated in 2000. The population was 194 at the 2020 census, down from 237 in 2010.

The village is part of the St. Louis, MO–IL Metropolitan Statistical Area.

== Geography ==
The village is in southeastern Macoupin County, surrounding Lake Ka-Ho, a reservoir built on a tributary of Panther Creek. It is just south of Mount Olive Lake, a reservoir built on Panther Creek. The reservoirs are in the watershed of Cahokia Creek, which flows west-southwest to the Mississippi River near St. Louis.

Lake Ka-Ho is 2 miles (3 km) northwest of Mount Olive and 6 miles (10 km) southeast of Gillespie. Interstate 55 passes just southeast of the village limits, with access from Exit 44 west of Mount Olive.

According to the 2021 census gazetteer files, Lake Ka-Ho has a total area of 0.32 square miles (0.83 km^{2}), of which 0.28 square miles (0.73 km^{2}) (or 87.65%) is land and 0.04 square miles (0.10 km^{2}) (or 12.35%) is water.

== Demographics ==
Historical population
Census	Pop.	Note	%±
2010	237		—
2020	194		−18.1%
U.S. Decennial Census

As of the 2020 census there were 194 people, 123 households, and 53 families residing in the village. The population density was 598.77 inhabitants per square mile (231.19/km^{2}). There were 129 housing units at an average density of 398.15 per square mile (153.73/km^{2}). The racial makeup of the village was 91.75% White, 0.00% African American, 0.52% Native American, 0.00% Asian, 0.00% Pacific Islander, 0.00% from other races, and 7.73% from two or more races. Hispanic or Latino of any race were 4.12% of the population.

There were 123 households, out of which 15.4% had children under the age of 18 living with them, 34.15% were married couples living together, 5.69% had a female householder with no husband present, and 56.91% were non-families. 55.28% of all households were made up of individuals, and 15.45% had someone living alone who was 65 years of age or older. The average household size was 3.06 and the average family size was 1.90.

The village's age distribution consisted of 14.5% under the age of 18, 8.1% from 18 to 24, 19.2% from 25 to 44, 41.5% from 45 to 64, and 16.7% who were 65 years of age or older. The median age was 49.5 years. For every 100 females, there were 118.7 males. For every 100 females age 18 and over, there were 143.9 males.

The median income for a household in the village was $41,875, and the median income for a family was $74,531. Males had a median income of $31,250 versus $38,125 for females. The per capita income for the village was $24,102. About 5.7% of families and 19.7% of the population were below the poverty line, including 0.0% of those under age 18 and 10.3% of those age 65 or over.
