= Brushy Mound Township, Macoupin County, Illinois =

Brushy Mound Township
- Township

- Location of Illinois in the United States
- Coordinates: 39°13′N 89°51′W
- Country: United States
- State: Illinois
- County: Macoupin

Area
  - Total: 35.83 sq mi (92.8 km^{2})
  - Land: 35.32 sq mi (91.5 km^{2})
  - Water: 0.51 sq mi (1.3 km^{2}) 1.43%
- Elevation: 679 ft (207 m)

Population (2020)
  - Total: 633
  - Density: 17.9/sq mi (6.92/km^{2})
- Time zone: UTC-6 (CST)
  - Summer (DST): UTC-5 (CDT)
- FIPS code: 17-117-09135

Brushy Mound Township (T9N R7W) is located in Macoupin County, Illinois, United States. As of the 2020 census, its population was 633 and it contained 326 housing units.

== Geography ==
According to the 2021 census gazetteer files, Brushy Mound Township has a total area of 35.83 square miles (92.80 km^{2}), of which 35.32 square miles (91.48 km^{2}) (or 98.57%) is land and 0.51 square miles (1.32 km^{2}) (or 1.43%) is water.

- Carlinville Township (north)
- Shaws Point Township (northeast)
- Honey Point Township (east)
- Cahokia Township (southeast)
- Gillespie Township (south)
- Hillyard Township (southwest)
- Polk Township (west)
- Bird Township (northwest)

== Demographics ==
As of the 2020 census there were 633 people, 238 households, and 158 families residing in the township. The population density was 17.67 inhabitants per square mile (6.82/km^{2}). There were 326 housing units at an average density of 9.10 per square mile (3.51/km^{2}). The racial makeup of the township was 97.47% White, 0.00% African American, 0.16% Native American, 0.32% Asian, 0.00% Pacific Islander, 0.32% from other races, and 1.74% from two or more races. Hispanic or Latino of any race were 0.95% of the population.

There were 238 households, out of which 21.80% had children under the age of 18 living with them, 66.39% were married couples living together, 0.00% had a female householder with no spouse present, and 33.61% were non-families. 26.90% of all households were made up of individuals, and 4.20% had someone living alone who was 65 years of age or older. The average household size was 2.41 and the average family size was 3.04.

According to the 2020 American Community Survey, township's age distribution consisted of 23.7% under the age of 18, 2.1% from 18 to 24, 23.5% from 25 to 44, 31% from 45 to 64, and 19.7% who were 65 years of age or older. The median age was 47.2 years. For every 100 females, there were 106.2 males. For every 100 females age 18 and over, there were 111.8 males.

The median income for a household in the township was $48,913, and the median income for a family was $71,667. Males had a median income of $41,000 versus $33,466 for females. The per capita income for the township was $34,832. About 0.0% of families and 1.4% of the population were below the poverty line, including 0.0% of those under age 18 and 0.0% of those age 65 or over.

Historical population
Census	Pop.	Note	%±
2000	751		—
2010	714		−4.9%
2020	633		−11.3%
U.S. Decennial Census
