= WBGZ =

- Alton, Illinois; United States
- Broadcast area: St. Louis, Missouri
- Frequency: 1570 kHz
- Branding: The Big Z

Programming
- Format: Talk
- Affiliations: Salem Radio Network

Ownership
- Owner: Metroplex Communications, Inc.

History
- First air date: February 4, 1948 (as WOKZ)
- Former call signs: WOKZ (1948–1984)

Technical information
- Licensing authority: FCC
- Facility ID: 41384
- Class: D
- Power: 1,000 watts day 74 watts night
- Transmitter coordinates: 38°55′44.00″N 90°13′3.00″W
- Translator: 107.1 W296DR (Alton)

Links
- Public license information: Public file; LMS
- Webcast: Listen Live
- Website: wbgzradio.com

WBGZ (1570 AM) is a radio station licensed to Alton, Illinois. The station carries a talk radio format. The station has been broadcasting for over 75 years. The station also broadcasts on translator W296DR 107.1 in Alton.

== History ==
WOKZ began broadcasting Wednesday, Feb. 4, 1948. Studios were located in the Stratford Hotel in downtown Alton. It was owned by the Illinois-Alton Broadcasting Company.

Former logo
