= Wilsonville, Illinois =

- Village
- Location in Macoupin County, Illinois
- Coordinates: 39°04′10″N 89°51′19″W
- Country: United States
- State: Illinois
- County: Macoupin
- Township: Dorchester

Area
  - Total: 0.98 sq mi (2.54 km^{2})
  - Land: 0.95 sq mi (2.47 km^{2})
  - Water: 0.027 sq mi (0.07 km^{2})
- Elevation: 640 ft (200 m)

Population (2020)
  - Total: 536
  - Density: 561.0/sq mi (216.59/km^{2})
- Time zone: UTC-6 (CST)
  - Summer (DST): UTC-5 (CDT)
- ZIP code: 62093
- Area code: 217
- FIPS code: 17-82218
- GNIS feature ID: 2399709

Wilsonville is a village in Macoupin County, Illinois, United States. The population was 536 at the 2020 census.

== Geography ==
Wilsonville is located in southern Macoupin County. Illinois Route 138 passes through the northwest side of the village, leading northeast 3 miles (5 km) to Mount Clare and west 7 miles (11 km) to Bunker Hill. Carlinville, the Macoupin county seat, is 17 miles (27 km) to the north.

According to the 2021 census gazetteer files, Wilsonville has a total area of 0.98 square miles (2.54 km^{2}), of which 0.96 square miles (2.49 km^{2}) (or 97.35%) is land and 0.03 square miles (0.08 km^{2}) (or 2.65%) is water. The West Fork of Cahokia Creek runs through a 50-foot-deep (15 m) ravine on the western edge of the village, flowing south to Cahokia Creek, a west-running direct tributary of the Mississippi River.

== Demographics ==
Historical population
Census	Pop.	Note	%±
1920	837		—
1930	1,220		45.8%
1940	902		−26.1%
1950	822		−8.9%
1960	688		−16.3%
1970	691		0.4%
1980	608		−12.0%
1990	609		0.2%
2000	604		−0.8%
2010	586		−3.0%
2020	536		−8.5%
U.S. Decennial Census

As of the 2020 census there were 536 people, 232 households, and 143 families residing in the village. The population density was 545.82 inhabitants per square mile (210.74/km^{2}). There were 256 housing units at an average density of 260.69 per square mile (100.65/km^{2}). The racial makeup of the village was 91.98% White, 0.75% African American, 0.19% Native American, 0.37% Asian, 0.00% Pacific Islander, 0.56% from other races, and 6.16% from two or more races. Hispanic or Latino of any race were 0.75% of the population.

There were 232 households, out of which 27.6% had children under the age of 18 living with them, 29.74% were married couples living together, 25.00% had a female householder with no husband present, and 38.36% were non-families. 34.48% of all households were made up of individuals, and 16.38% had someone living alone who was 65 years of age or older. The average household size was 3.06 and the average family size was 2.64.

The village's age distribution consisted of 27.1% under the age of 18, 5.7% from 18 to 24, 27.7% from 25 to 44, 21.8% from 45 to 64, and 17.5% who were 65 years of age or older. The median age was 40.2 years. For every 100 females, there were 138.1 males. For every 100 females age 18 and over, there were 102.7 males.

The median income for a household in the village was $48,500, and the median income for a family was $63,147. Males had a median income of $34,167 versus $30,833 for females. The per capita income for the village was $23,052. About 15.4% of families and 16.9% of the population were below the poverty line, including 25.8% of those under age 18 and 1.9% of those age 65 or over.
