= Bird Township, Macoupin County, Illinois =

Bird Township
- Township

- Location of Illinois in the United States
- Coordinates: 39°18′N 90°1′W
- Country: United States
- State: Illinois
- County: Macoupin
- Settled: November 1, 1870

Area
  - Total: 36.19 sq mi (93.7 km^{2})
  - Land: 36.17 sq mi (93.7 km^{2})
  - Water: 0.02 sq mi (0.052 km^{2}) 0.05%
- Elevation: 600 ft (180 m)

Population (2020)
  - Total: 291
  - Density: 8.05/sq mi (3.11/km^{2})
- Time zone: UTC-6 (CST)
  - Summer (DST): UTC-5 (CDT)
- FIPS code: 17-117-06067

Bird Township (T10N R8W) is located in Macoupin County, Illinois, United States. As of the 2020 census, its population was 291 and it contained 132 housing units.

== Geography ==
According to the 2021 census gazetteer files, Bird Township has a total area of 36.19 square miles (93.73 km^{2}), of which 36.17 square miles (93.68 km^{2}) (or 99.95%) is land and 0.02 square miles (0.05 km^{2}) (or 0.05%) is water.

=== Adjacent townships ===
- South Palmyra Township (north)
- South Otter Township (northeast)
- Carlinville Township (east)
- Brushy Mound Township (southeast)
- Polk Township (souths)
- Chesterfield Township (southwest)
- Western Mound Township (west)
- Barr Township (northwest)

== Demographics ==
As of the 2020 census there were 291 people, 88 households, and 45 families residing in the township. The population density was 8.04 inhabitants per square mile (3.10/km^{2}). There were 132 housing units at an average density of 3.65 per square mile (1.41/km^{2}). The racial makeup of the township was 97.94% White, 0.34% African American, 0.00% Native American, 0.00% Asian, 0.00% Pacific Islander, 0.00% from other races, and 1.72% from two or more races. Hispanic or Latino of any race were 0.69% of the population.

There were 88 households, out of which 15.90% had children under the age of 18 living with them, 51.14% were married couples living together, 0.00% had a female householder with no spouse present, and 48.86% were non-families. 38.60% of all households were made up of individuals, and 38.60% had someone living alone who was 65 years of age or older. The average household size was 1.91 and the average family size was 2.58.

According to the 2020 American Community Survey, township's age distribution consisted of 16.1% under the age of 18, 0.0% from 18 to 24, 0% from 25 to 44, 36.4% from 45 to 64, and 47.6% who were 65 years of age or older. The median age was 64.4 years. For every 100 females, there were 114 males. For every 100 females age 18 and over, there were 115.2 males.

The median income for a household in the township was $95,962. Males had a median income of $90,446 versus $32,292 for females. The per capita income for the township was $63,495. About 0.0% of families and 10.7% of the population were below the poverty line, including 0.0% of those under age 18 and 11.3% of those age 65 or over.

Historical population
Census	Pop.	Note	%±
2000	279		—
2010	308		10.4%
2020	291		−5.5%
U.S. Decennial Census
