= South Palmyra Township, Macoupin County, Illinois =

South Palmyra Township
- Township

- Location of Illinois in the United States
- Coordinates: 39°23′N 89°58′W
- Country: United States
- State: Illinois
- County: Macoupin
- Settled: November 1, 1870

Area
  - Total: 36.18 sq mi (93.7 km^{2})
  - Land: 36.16 sq mi (93.7 km^{2})
  - Water: 0.02 sq mi (0.052 km^{2}) 0.06%
- Elevation: 620 ft (190 m)

Population (2020)
  - Total: 672
  - Density: 18.6/sq mi (7.18/km^{2})
- Time zone: UTC-6 (CST)
  - Summer (DST): UTC-5 (CDT)
- FIPS code: 17-117-71136

South Palmyra Township (T11N R8W) is located in Macoupin County, Illinois, United States. As of the 2020 census, its population was 672 and it contained 354 housing units.

== Geography ==
According to the 2021 census gazetteer files, South Palmyra Township has a total area of 36.18 square miles (93.71 km^{2}), of which 36.16 square miles (93.65 km^{2}) (or 99.94%) is land and 0.02 square miles (0.05 km^{2}) (or 0.06%) is water.

== Demographics ==
As of the 2020 census there were 672 people, 334 households, and 202 families residing in the township. The population density was 18.57 inhabitants per square mile (7.17/km^{2}). There were 354 housing units at an average density of 9.78 per square mile (3.78/km^{2}). The racial makeup of the township was 96.28% White, 0.60% African American, 0.74% Native American, 0.15% Asian, 0.00% Pacific Islander, 0.15% from other races, and 2.08% from two or more races. Hispanic or Latino of any race were 1.34% of the population.

There were 334 households, out of which 26.60% had children under the age of 18 living with them, 42.22% were married couples living together, 13.47% had a female householder with no spouse present, and 39.52% were non-families. 29.90% of all households were made up of individuals, and 14.70% had someone living alone who was 65 years of age or older. The average household size was 2.25 and the average family size was 2.76.

According to the 2020 American Community Survey, township's age distribution consisted of 18.4% under the age of 18, 2.8% from 18 to 24, 17.3% from 25 to 44, 36.6% from 45 to 64, and 25.0% who were 65 years of age or older. The median age was 47.5 years. For every 100 females, there were 106.1 males. For every 100 females age 18 and over, there were 106.8 males.

The median income for a household in the township was $49,583, and the median income for a family was $50,833. Males had a median income of $39,474 versus $30,446 for females. The per capita income for the township was $24,464. About 11.9% of families and 14.8% of the population were below the poverty line, including 18.7% of those under age 18 and 6.9% of those age 65 or over.

Historical population
Census	Pop.	Note	%±
2000	819		—
2010	747		−8.8%
2020	672		−10.0%
U.S. Decennial Census

== Adjacent townships ==
- North Palmyra Township (north)
- North Otter Township (northeast)
- South Otter Township (east)
- Carlinville Township (southeast)
- Bird Township (south)
- Western Mound Township (southwest)
- Barr Township (west)
- Scottville Township (northwest)
