= Shaws Point Township, Macoupin County, Illinois =

Shaws Point Township
- Township

- Location of Illinois in the United States
- Coordinates: 39°18′N 89°46′W
- Country: United States
- State: Illinois
- County: Macoupin
- Settled: November 1, 1870

Area
  - Total: 34.16 sq mi (88.5 km^{2})
  - Land: 34.08 sq mi (88.3 km^{2})
  - Water: 0.08 sq mi (0.21 km^{2}) 0.24%
- Elevation: 633 ft (193 m)

Population (2020)
  - Total: 469
  - Density: 13.8/sq mi (5.31/km^{2})
- Time zone: UTC-6 (CST)
  - Summer (DST): UTC-5 (CDT)
- FIPS code: 17-117-69121

Shaws Point Township (T10N R6W) is located in Macoupin County, Illinois, United States. As of the 2020 census, its population was 469 and it contained 215 housing units.

== Geography ==
According to the 2021 census gazetteer files, Shaws Point Township has a total area of 34.16 square miles (88.47 km^{2}), of which 34.08 square miles (88.27 km^{2}) (or 99.76%) is land and 0.08 square miles (0.21 km^{2}) (or 0.24%) is water.

== Demographics ==
As of the 2020 census there were 469 people, 217 households, and 179 families residing in the township. The population density was 13.73 inhabitants per square mile (5.30/km^{2}). There were 215 housing units at an average density of 6.29 per square mile (2.43/km^{2}). The racial makeup of the township was 95.31% White, 0.64% African American, 0.21% Native American, 0.64% Asian, 0.00% Pacific Islander, 0.43% from other races, and 2.77% from two or more races. Hispanic or Latino of any race were 1.07% of the population.

There were 217 households, out of which 24.90% had children under the age of 18 living with them, 68.20% were married couples living together, 13.82% had a female householder with no spouse present, and 17.51% were non-families. 16.60% of all households were made up of individuals, and 13.40% had someone living alone who was 65 years of age or older. The average household size was 2.31 and the average family size was 2.41.

According to the 2020 American Community Survey, township's age distribution consisted of 15.5% under the age of 18, 4.8% from 18 to 24, 19.4% from 25 to 44, 27.8% from 45 to 64, and 32.7% who were 65 years of age or older. The median age was 50.8 years. For every 100 females, there were 116.1 males. For every 100 females age 18 and over, there were 105.4 males.

The median income for a household in the township was $80,875, and the median income for a family was $71,146. Males had a median income of $80,278 versus $30,729 for females. The per capita income for the township was $34,343. About 6.1% of families and 11.2% of the population were below the poverty line, including 1.3% of those under age 18 and 26.8% of those age 65 or over.

Historical population
Census	Pop.	Note	%±
2000	490		—
2010	532		8.6%
2020	469		−11.8%
U.S. Decennial Census

== Adjacent townships ==
- Nilwood Township (north)
- Zanesville Township, Montgomery County (east)
- North Litchfield Township, Montgomery County (southeast)
- Honey Point Township (south)
- Brushy Mound Township (southwest)
- Carlinville Township (west)
- South Otter Township (northwest)
