= North Palmyra Township, Macoupin County, Illinois =

North Palmyra Township
- Township

- Location of Illinois in the United States
- Coordinates: 39°29′N 89°59′W
- Country: United States
- State: Illinois
- County: Macoupin
- Settled: November 1, 1870

Area
  - Total: 36.22 sq mi (93.8 km^{2})
  - Land: 36.16 sq mi (93.7 km^{2})
  - Water: 0.06 sq mi (0.16 km^{2}) 0.17%
- Elevation: 679 ft (207 m)

Population (2020)
  - Total: 845
  - Density: 23.4/sq mi (9.02/km^{2})
- Time zone: UTC-6 (CST)
  - Summer (DST): UTC-5 (CDT)
- FIPS code: 17-117-54053

North Palmyra Township (T12N R8W) is located in Macoupin County, Illinois, United States. As of the 2020 census, its population was 845 and it contained 375 housing units.

== Geography ==
According to the 2021 census gazetteer files, North Palmyra Township has a total area of 36.22 square miles (93.81 km^{2}), of which 36.16 square miles (93.65 km^{2}) (or 99.83%) is land and 0.06 square miles (0.16 km^{2}) (or 0.17%) is water.

== Demographics ==
As of the 2020 census there were 845 people, 419 households, and 300 families residing in the township. The population density was 23.33 inhabitants per square mile (9.01/km^{2}). There were 375 housing units at an average density of 10.35 per square mile (4.00/km^{2}). The racial makeup of the township was 95.15% White, 0.00% African American, 0.47% Native American, 0.36% Asian, 0.00% Pacific Islander, 0.00% from other races, and 4.02% from two or more races. Hispanic or Latino of any race were 0.83% of the population.

There were 419 households, out of which 20.50% had children under the age of 18 living with them, 63.01% were married couples living together, 6.92% had a female householder with no spouse present, and 28.40% were non-families. 24.30% of all households were made up of individuals, and 13.10% had someone living alone who was 65 years of age or older. The average household size was 2.27 and the average family size was 2.66.

According to the 2020 American Community Survey, township's age distribution consisted of 17.9% under the age of 18, 6.8% from 18 to 24, 17.8% from 25 to 44, 30.9% from 45 to 64, and 26.5% who were 65 years of age or older. The median age was 47.7 years. For every 100 females, there were 103.1 males. For every 100 females age 18 and over, there were 99.4 males.

The median income for a household in the township was $51,138, and the median income for a family was $52,455. Males had a median income of $26,250 versus $36,538 for females. The per capita income for the township was $25,589. About 8.0% of families and 14.0% of the population were below the poverty line, including 24.1% of those under age 18 and 4.8% of those age 65 or over.

Historical population
Census	Pop.	Note	%±
2000	974		—
2010	854		−12.3%
2020	845		−1.1%
U.S. Decennial Census

== Adjacent townships ==
- Road District No. 13, Morgan County, Illinois (north)
- Talkington Township, Sangamon County (northeast)
- North Otter Township (east)
- South Otter Township (southeast)
- South Palmyra Township (south)
- Barr Township (southwest)
- Scottville Township (west)
- Road District No. 12, Morgan County, Illinois (northwest)
