= Macoupin County, Illinois =

County in Illinois, United States

- County
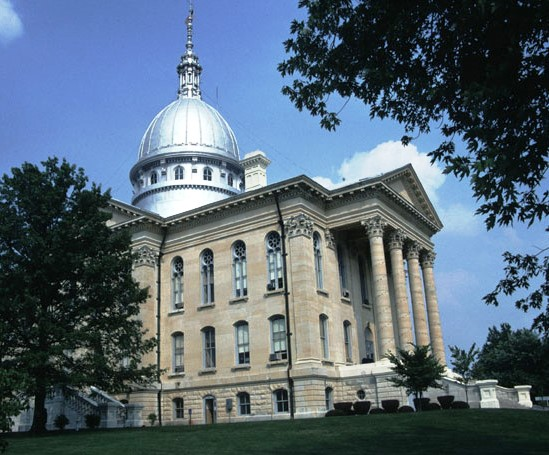
- Macoupin County Courthouse in Carlinville

- Location within the U.S. state of Illinois
- Coordinates: 39°16′N 89°55′W
- Country: United States
- State: Illinois
- Founded: 1829
- Named for: Macoupin Creek
- Seat: Carlinville
- Largest city: Carlinville

Area
  - Total: 868 sq mi (2,250 km^{2})
  - Land: 863 sq mi (2,240 km^{2})
  - Water: 4.7 sq mi (12 km^{2}) 0.5%

Population (2020)
  - Total: 44,967
  - Estimate (2025): 43,748 ▼
  - Density: 52.1/sq mi (20.1/km^{2})
- Time zone: UTC−6 (Central)
  - Summer (DST): UTC−5 (CDT)
- Congressional district: 13th
- Website: www.macoupincountyil.gov

Macoupin County (/məˈkupɪn/ or /məˈkupən/) is a county located in the U.S. state of Illinois. According to the 2020 census, it had a population of 44,967. The county seat is Carlinville.

The primary industry is agriculture, consisting of crops of corn (maize), soybeans, and some wheat.

== History ==
The region was inhabited by Illinoisan Indians when the first white explorers arrived. Macoupin is an adaptation of the Miami-Illinois term for the American lotus Nelumbo lutea. None of the native Indians remain, although some descendants of the earliest European settlers claim partial ancestry. The first European contact was by French explorers in the seventeenth century, travelling southward down the major rivers. The main European settlement was from the southwest, as people moved inland from the established transportation route of the Mississippi River.

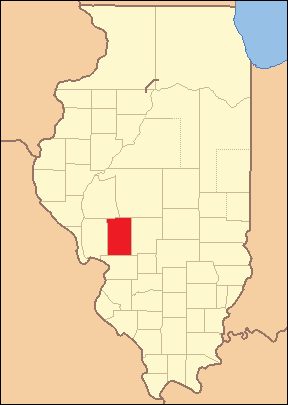
Macoupin County at the time of its creation in 1829

Macoupin County was established on January 17, 1829. It was formed out of Greene and Madison Counties and was named after Macoupin Creek, which runs near Carlinville and meanders southwest to the Illinois River. The economy was based on subsistence agriculture, and communication was to the southwest.

In the middle 19th century, Illinois developed and changed rapidly. The greatest change was in the building of railroads, and Macoupin County was on the rail and road transportation link between St. Louis and the still-young metropolis of Chicago. The county lies midway between St. Louis and the relocated state capital of Springfield. The economy was still based entirely on agriculture, but there was now easier market access. Towns were small and sparsely distributed, and any new communities were founded along the railroad lines that provided transportation. Culturally, the county remained closer to its historical ties with St. Louis than to more northerly areas.

Agriculture remained a mainstay of the economy, but this was joined by coal mining, an industry that partially changed the complexion of the county. With coal underlying the entire region, the most economical development was to place mines alongside the railroad tracks (for transportation of coal) and located in or near already-existing towns. By the twentieth century, there were mines in many towns, all of them with substantial populations of foreign-born miners from everywhere in Europe.

During the twentieth century, agriculture and coal mining remained the mainstays of the county's economy, and the county's fortunes rose and fell with them. Farming was still family based. Macoupin County was often at the center of major labor disputes between mine owners and miners and was a hotbed of union activity. The county had previously played a significant role in violent 1890s disputes that brought unwanted national attention, was at center stage when the United Mine Workers rose to power, and was again prominent during the internecine war between the UMW and the Progressive Miners of America of the 1930s.

Agriculture remained the county's prime economic activity, but farming became a large-scale corporate enterprise, with small family farms rapidly disappearing. Coal mining decreased and has almost disappeared entirely. Buildings and structures related to coal mining were torn down as they were wasted away, so there is now little to see of this once-major industry.

Towns were (and still are) characterized either by a midwestern town square layout or by a main street layout. In the former, a central city block may be a small park with a gazebo, with the small businesses of the town surrounding it. In the latter, a single street will have the small businesses of the town lining either side of it. Carlinville has a city square layout, with the main county building occupying the central city block. This building houses all the offices of the county. Typically, churches of the various denominations will lie within two or three blocks of the town square, or sometimes will lie mainly along a single street near the town's center.

With modern roads easily accessible, some towns in the northern part of the county became virtual bedroom communities as people commuted to Springfield to work and shop, hastening the decline of small businesses in the towns. The same effect was felt in the southernmost part of the county, and in 2005, the U.S. Census Bureau included the county in the St. Louis Metropolitan Statistical Area due to increased commuting patterns and employment in St. Louis and the Metro-East.

== Geography ==
According to the U.S. Census Bureau, the county has a total area of 868 square miles (2,250 km^{2}), of which 863 square miles (2,240 km^{2}) is land and 4.7 square miles (12 km^{2}) (0.5%) is water.

=== Climate and weather ===
Carlinville, Illinois

Climate chart (precipitation, max. and min. temperature)
J	F	M	A	M	J	J	A	S	O	N	D
2 35 17	2 41 22	3.5 53 32	4 65 43	4.3 75 53	3.9 84 62	3.7 87 67	3.3 86 64	2.9 79 56	2.7 68 44	3.6 52 33	2.9 40 23
- █ Average max. and min. temperatures in °F
- █ Precipitation totals in inches
- Source: The Weather Channel
Metric conversion
J	F	M	A	M	J	J	A	S	O	N	D
50 2 −8	50 5 −6	90 12 0	100 18 6	108 24 12	99 29 17	93 31 19	85 30 18	73 26 13	68 20 7	92 11 1	73 4 −5
- █ Average max. and min. temperatures in °C
- █ Precipitation totals in mm

In recent years, average temperatures in the county seat of Carlinville have ranged from a low of 17 °F (−8 °C) in January to a high of 87 °F (31 °C) in July. A record low of −23 °F (−31 °C) was recorded in February 1905 and a record high of 113 °F (45 °C) was recorded in July 1954. Average monthly precipitation ranged from 1.95 inches (50 mm) in February to 4.25 inches (108 mm) in May.

=== Major highways ===
- Interstate 55
- Illinois Route 4
- Illinois Route 16
- Illinois Route 138
- Illinois Route 108
- Illinois Route 111
- Illinois Route 159
- Illinois Route 267

=== Adjacent counties ===
- Sangamon County – northeast
- Montgomery County – east
- Madison County – south
- Greene County – west
- Jersey County – west
- Morgan County – northwest

== Demographics ==
Historical population
Census	Pop.	Note	%±
1830	1,990		—
1840	7,826		293.3%
1850	12,355		57.9%
1860	24,602		99.1%
1870	32,726		33.0%
1880	37,692		15.2%
1890	40,380		7.1%
1900	42,256		4.6%
1910	50,685		19.9%
1920	57,274		13.0%
1930	48,703		−15.0%
1940	46,304		−4.9%
1950	44,210		−4.5%
1960	43,524		−1.6%
1970	44,557		2.4%
1980	49,384		10.8%
1990	47,679		−3.5%
2000	49,019		2.8%
2010	47,765		−2.6%
2020	44,967		−5.9%
2025 (est.)	43,748	▼	−2.7%
U.S. Decennial Census; 1790-1960 1900-1990; 1990-2000 2010

=== 2020 census ===
As of the 2020 census, the county had a population of 44,967. The median age was 44.4 years. 20.9% of residents were under the age of 18 and 21.6% of residents were 65 years of age or older. For every 100 females there were 98.5 males, and for every 100 females age 18 and over there were 95.6 males age 18 and over.

The racial makeup of the county was 93.6% White, 0.8% Black or African American, 0.3% American Indian and Alaska Native, 0.4% Asian, <0.1% Native Hawaiian and Pacific Islander, 0.3% from some other race, and 4.6% from two or more races. Hispanic or Latino residents of any race comprised 1.3% of the population.

34.5% of residents lived in urban areas, while 65.5% lived in rural areas.

There were 18,804 households in the county, of which 27.2% had children under the age of 18 living in them. Of all households, 49.6% were married-couple households, 18.6% were households with a male householder and no spouse or partner present, and 24.5% were households with a female householder and no spouse or partner present. About 29.2% of all households were made up of individuals and 14.5% had someone living alone who was 65 years of age or older.

There were 21,023 housing units, of which 10.6% were vacant. Among occupied housing units, 76.0% were owner-occupied and 24.0% were renter-occupied. The homeowner vacancy rate was 2.0% and the rental vacancy rate was 7.8%.

=== Racial and ethnic composition ===
Macoupin County County, Illinois – Racial and ethnic composition Note: the US Census treats Hispanic/Latino as an ethnic category. This table excludes Latinos from the racial categories and assigns them to a separate category. Hispanics/Latinos may be of any race.
Race / Ethnicity (NH = Non-Hispanic)	Pop 1980	Pop 1990	Pop 2000	Pop 2010	Pop 2020	% 1980	% 1990	% 2000	% 2010	% 2020
White alone (NH)	21,665	20,089	47,828	46,315	41,850	97.74%	96.15%	97.57%	96.96%	93.07%
Black or African American alone (NH)	297	581	396	359	368	1.34%	2.78%	0.81%	0.75%	0.82%
Native American or Alaska Native alone (NH)	37	37	100	110	109	0.17%	0.18%	0.20%	0.23%	0.24%
Asian alone (NH)	26	31	88	129	179	0.12%	0.15%	0.18%	0.27%	0.40%
Native Hawaiian or Pacific Islander alone (NH)	x	x	12	8	0	x	x	0.02%	0.02%	0.00%
Other race alone (NH)	9	1	19	32	54	0.04%	0.00%	0.04%	0.07%	0.12%
Mixed race or Multiracial (NH)	x	x	271	394	1,837	x	x	0.55%	0.82%	4.09%
Hispanic or Latino (any race)	133	154	305	418	570	0.60%	0.74%	0.62%	0.88%	1.27%
Total	22,167	20,893	49,019	47,765	44,967	100.00%	100.00%	100.00%	100.00%	100.00%

=== 2010 census ===
As of the 2010 United States census, there were 47,765 people, 19,381 households, and 13,224 families residing in the county. The population density was 55.4 inhabitants per square mile (21.4/km^{2}). There were 21,584 housing units at an average density of 25.0 per square mile (9.7/km^{2}). The racial makeup of the county was 97.6% white, 0.8% black or African American, 0.3% Asian, 0.3% American Indian, 0.2% from other races, and 0.9% from two or more races. Those of Hispanic or Latino origin made up 0.9% of the population. In terms of ancestry, 35.8% were German, 16.2% were Irish, 13.9% were English, 9.5% were American, and 8.0% were Italian.

Of the 19,381 households, 30.2% had children under the age of 18 living with them, 53.5% were married couples living together, 9.8% had a female householder with no husband present, 31.8% were non-families, and 27.0% of all households were made up of individuals. The average household size was 2.42 and the average family size was 2.90. The median age was 41.7 years.

The median income for a household in the county was $47,178 and the median income for a family was $59,700. Males had a median income of $48,878 versus $30,748 for females. The per capita income for the county was $23,222. About 9.7% of families and 12.0% of the population were below the poverty line, including 17.4% of those under age 18 and 5.5% of those age 65 or over.

== Communities ==
=== Cities ===
- Benld
- Bunker Hill
- Carlinville (seat)
- Gillespie
- Girard
- Mount Olive
- Staunton
- Virden

=== Towns ===
- Nilwood
- Shipman

=== Villages ===
- Brighton
- Chesterfield
- Dorchester
- Eagarville
- East Gillespie
- Hettick
- Lake Ka-ho
- Medora
- Modesto
- Mount Clare
- Palmyra
- Royal Lakes
- Sawyerville
- Scottville
- Standard City
- White City
- Wilsonville

=== Unincorporated communities ===
- Anderson
- Atwater
- Barr
- Hagaman
- McVey
- Piasa
- Plainview
- Womac
- Woodburn

=== Townships ===
Macoupin County is divided into twenty-six townships:

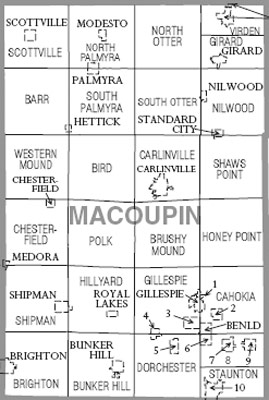
Map of Macoupin County, Illinois

- Barr
- Bird
- Brighton
- Brushy Mound
- Bunker Hill
- Cahokia
- Carlinville
- Chesterfield
- Dorchester
- Gillespie
- Girard
- Hillyard
- Honey Point
- Mount Olive
- Nilwood
- North Otter
- North Palmyra
- Polk
- Scottville
- Shaws Point
- Shipman
- South Otter
- South Palmyra
- Staunton
- Virden
- Western Mound

== Politics ==
As part of the rural German Catholic belt surrounding the Illinois section of the St. Louis metropolitan area, Macoupin County traditionally favored the Democratic Party. Up to and including the 2000 election, Macoupin voted for the Republican nominee only in six major landslide victories, and no Republican gained an absolute majority of the county's vote until Richard Nixon’s 3,000-plus-county landslides victory over George McGovern in 1972.

The twenty-first century has seen a major change in these voting patterns due to the county's conservative population. The 2012 election saw Illinoisan Barack Obama become the first Democrat to win the presidency without carrying Macoupin County, and in 2016 Hillary Clinton won less than thirty percent of the vote in this once traditionally Democratic county – a figure eleven percent worse than McGovern's in his landslide defeat.

United States presidential election results for Macoupin County, Illinois
Year	Republican		Democratic		Third party(ies)	
Year	No.	%	No.	%	No.	%
1892	3,868	40.53%	5,051	52.92%	625	6.55%
1896	4,970	46.41%	5,574	52.05%	164	1.53%
1900	4,814	45.10%	5,472	51.27%	387	3.63%
1904	4,796	46.69%	4,336	42.21%	1,140	11.10%
1908	4,988	42.76%	5,775	49.51%	901	7.72%
1912	2,177	21.11%	4,902	47.53%	3,235	31.37%
1916	8,875	43.64%	10,012	49.24%	1,448	7.12%
1920	8,700	44.68%	5,936	30.49%	4,834	24.83%
1924	8,571	39.24%	6,134	28.08%	7,136	32.67%
1928	10,699	47.68%	11,290	50.32%	449	2.00%
1932	7,031	29.74%	14,810	62.65%	1,799	7.61%
1936	9,502	36.76%	14,896	57.62%	1,453	5.62%
1940	13,000	47.08%	14,356	52.00%	254	0.92%
1944	11,572	48.86%	11,951	50.46%	160	0.68%
1948	10,198	45.74%	11,742	52.66%	358	1.61%
1952	12,336	48.67%	12,944	51.07%	68	0.27%
1956	12,290	49.90%	12,303	49.96%	34	0.14%
1960	11,731	47.12%	13,120	52.70%	45	0.18%
1964	8,430	35.63%	15,227	64.37%	0	0.00%
1968	10,262	43.91%	10,750	46.00%	2,356	10.08%
1972	13,583	58.03%	9,662	41.28%	162	0.69%
1976	10,242	45.55%	11,910	52.97%	334	1.49%
1980	12,131	54.27%	9,116	40.78%	1,107	4.95%
1984	12,282	53.51%	10,602	46.19%	69	0.30%
1988	9,362	43.20%	12,195	56.28%	112	0.52%
1992	6,518	27.55%	12,050	50.93%	5,093	21.52%
1996	7,235	34.33%	11,107	52.70%	2,733	12.97%
2000	9,749	45.58%	11,015	51.50%	625	2.92%
2004	11,413	50.09%	11,193	49.12%	179	0.79%
2008	9,891	44.07%	12,090	53.87%	462	2.06%
2012	10,946	51.92%	9,464	44.89%	673	3.19%
2016	14,322	63.96%	6,689	29.87%	1,380	6.16%
2020	16,153	67.11%	7,365	30.60%	552	2.29%
2024	16,065	68.35%	6,892	29.32%	546	2.32%

== Education ==
- Bunker Hill Community Unit School District 8
- Carlinville Community Unit School District 1
- Gillespie Community Unit School District 7
- Mount Olive Community Unit School District 5
- North Mac Community Unit School District 34
- Northwestern Community Unit School District 2
- Southwestern Community Unit School District 9
- Staunton Community Unit School District 6

== See also ==
- National Register of Historic Places listings in Macoupin County, Illinois
- Charles Goodnight
