= Barr Township, Macoupin County, Illinois =

Barr Township
- Township

- Location of Illinois in the United States
- Coordinates: 39°23′N 90°5′W
- Country: United States
- State: Illinois
- County: Macoupin
- Settled: November 1, 1870

Area
  - Total: 36.81 sq mi (95.3 km^{2})
  - Land: 36.65 sq mi (94.9 km^{2})
  - Water: 0.16 sq mi (0.41 km^{2}) 0.44%
- Elevation: 643 ft (196 m)

Population (2020)
  - Total: 314
  - Density: 8.57/sq mi (3.31/km^{2})
- Time zone: UTC-6 (CST)
  - Summer (DST): UTC-5 (CDT)
- FIPS code: 17-117-03792

Barr Township (T11N R9W) is located in Macoupin County, Illinois, USA. As of the 2020 census, its population was 314 and it contained 140 housing units.

== Geography ==
According to the 2021 census gazetteer files, Barr Township has a total area of 36.81 square miles (95.34 km^{2}), of which 36.65 square miles (94.92 km^{2}) (or 99.56%) is land and 0.16 square miles (0.41 km^{2}) (or 0.44%) is water.

== Demographics ==
As of the 2020 census there were 314 people, 174 households, and 110 families residing in the township. The population density was 8.53 inhabitants per square mile (3.29/km^{2}). There were 140 housing units at an average density of 3.80 per square mile (1.47/km^{2}). The racial makeup of the township was 94.59% White, 0.32% African American, 0.00% Native American, 0.00% Asian, 0.00% Pacific Islander, 0.32% from other races, and 4.78% from two or more races. Hispanic or Latino of any race were 2.55% of the population.

There were 174 households, out of which 42.00% had children under the age of 18 living with them, 27.59% were married couples living together, 24.14% had a female householder with no spouse present, and 36.78% were non-families. 27.60% of all households were made up of individuals, and 14.40% had someone living alone who was 65 years of age or older. The average household size was 3.07 and the average family size was 3.94.

According to the 2020 American Community Survey, township's age distribution consisted of 48.0% under the age of 18, 0.4% from 18 to 24, 21.2% from 25 to 44, 17.3% from 45 to 64, and 12.9% who were 65 years of age or older. The median age was 32.5 years. For every 100 females, there were 119.6 males. For every 100 females age 18 and over, there were 134.3 males.

The median income for a household in the township was $42,500. Males had a median income of $105,313 versus $32,639 for females. The per capita income for the township was $22,143. About 38.2% of families and 40.7% of the population were below the poverty line, including 68.5% of those under age 18 and 0.0% of those age 65 or over.

Historical population
| Census | Pop. | Note | %± |
|---|---|---|---|
| 2000 | 351 | | — |
| 2010 | 329 | | −6.3% |
| 2020 | 314 | | −4.6% |
U.S. Decennial Census

== Adjacent townships ==
- Scottville Township (north)
- North Palmyra Township (northeast)
- South Palmyra Township (east)
- Bird Township (southeast)
- Western Mound Township (south)
- Rockbridge Township, Greene County (southwest)
- Rubicon Township, Greene County (west)
- Athensville Township, Greene County (northwest)
