= Chesterfield Township, Macoupin County, Illinois =

Chesterfield Township
- Township

- Location of Illinois in the United States
- Coordinates: 39°13′N 90°5′W
- Country: United States
- State: Illinois
- County: Macoupin
- Settled: November 1, 1870

Area
  - Total: 35.84 sq mi (92.8 km^{2})
  - Land: 35.81 sq mi (92.7 km^{2})
  - Water: 0.03 sq mi (0.078 km^{2}) 0.07%
- Elevation: 571 ft (174 m)

Population (2020)
  - Total: 744
  - Density: 20.8/sq mi (8.02/km^{2})
- Time zone: UTC-6 (CST)
  - Summer (DST): UTC-5 (CDT)
- FIPS code: 17-117-13178

Chesterfield Township (T9N R9W) is located in Macoupin County, Illinois, United States. As of the 2020 census, its population was 744 and it contained 340 housing units.

== Geography ==
According to the 2021 census gazetteer files, Chesterfield Township has a total area of 35.84 square miles (92.83 km^{2}), of which 35.81 square miles (92.75 km^{2}) (or 99.93%) is land and 0.03 square miles (0.08 km^{2}) (or 0.07%) is water.

== Demographics ==
As of the 2020 census there were 744 people, 318 households, and 261 families residing in the township. The population density was 20.76 inhabitants per square mile (8.02/km^{2}). There were 340 housing units at an average density of 9.49 per square mile (3.66/km^{2}). The racial makeup of the township was 93.01% White, 1.08% African American, 0.40% Native American, 0.13% Asian, 0.00% Pacific Islander, 0.54% from other races, and 4.84% from two or more races. Hispanic or Latino of any race were 1.75% of the population.

There were 318 households, out of which 34.30% had children under the age of 18 living with them, 65.72% were married couples living together, 3.77% had a female householder with no spouse present, and 17.92% were non-families. 15.70% of all households were made up of individuals, and 2.50% had someone living alone who was 65 years of age or older. The average household size was 2.36 and the average family size was 2.62.

According to the 2020 American Community Survey, township's age distribution consisted of 18.0% under the age of 18, 4.9% from 18 to 24, 22.7% from 25 to 44, 36.5% from 45 to 64, and 18.1% who were 65 years of age or older. The median age was 46.5 years. For every 100 females, there were 109 males. For every 100 females age 18 and over, there were 109.7 males.

The median income for a household in the township was $63,203, and the median income for a family was $64,960. Males had a median income of $39,821 versus $27,639 for females. The per capita income for the township was $31,584. About 5.7% of families and 7.1% of the population were below the poverty line, including 5.2% of those under age 18 and 1.5% of those age 65 or over.

Historical population
Census	Pop.	Note	%±
2000	943		—
2010	855		−9.3%
2020	744		−13.0%
U.S. Decennial Census

== Adjacent townships ==
- Western Mound Township (north)
- Bird Township (northeast)
- Polk Township (east)
- Hillyard Township (southeast)
- Shipman Township (south)
- Fidelity Township, Jersey County (southwest)
- Ruyle Township, Jersey County (west)
- Rockbridge Township, Greene County (northwest)
