= Illinois Route 111 =

State highway in southwestern Illinois, US

Illinois Route 111
- IL 111 highlighted in red

Route information
- Maintained by IDOT
- Length: 82.18 mi (132.26 km)
- Existed: 1924–present

Major junctions
- South end: Lake Drive in Centreville
- I-64 in Washington Park; I-55 / I-70 / US 40 in Collinsville; I-270 in Pontoon Beach; US 67 / IL 3 in Alton; US 67 / IL 267 in Godfrey
- North end: IL 104 in Waverly

Location
- Country: United States
- State: Illinois
- Counties: St. Clair, Madison, Jersey, Macoupin, Morgan

Highway system
- Illinois State Highway System; Interstate; US; State; Tollways; Scenic
← IL 110 (CKC)	→ IL 113

Illinois Route 111 (IL-111) is an 82.18-mile-long (132.26 km) north–south state highway in the southwestern part of the U.S. state of Illinois. It travels from Short Street (near Lake Drive and 1/4 mile (0.40 km) northwest of Interstate 255) in Centreville to IL 104 in Waverly.

== Route description ==
IL 111 has concurrencies with IL 140 from Bethalto to Alton, IL 3 in Alton, U.S. Route 67 (US 67) in Godfrey, and IL 267 from Godfrey to Medora.

== History ==
In August 1960, a new alignment in Alton on what is now the Homer M. Adams Parkway opened to traffic from IL 100 to IL 140. A second new alignment, Bellwood Road Extension in Bethalto, opened a few years later that would link IL 111 up with Vaughn and Central in Wood River. The original alignment of IL 111 in Alton had it cut up Sixth Street in Wood River, Old Alton–Edwardsville Road (with a concurrency with then-IL 159), and up Broadway in Alton until its concurrency with US 67 using Belle Street.

SBI Route 111 originally traveled from Waverly to Alton on modern-day IL 111. In 1942, it was extended south to Fairmont City. In 1953, it was extended further south to near East Saint Louis, which became Centreville. In 2001, when US 67 was moved west through Jerseyville, IL 267 took its place north of Medora. Some time after, IL 267 was applied south along with IL 111 on a concurrency.

== Major intersections ==
County	Location	mi	km	Destinations	Notes
St. Clair	Centreville	0.0	0.0	Lake Drive	
St. Clair	Washington Park	1.5	2.4	I-64 – Mt. Vernon, St. Louis	I-64 exit 6
Madison	Fairmont City	4.6	7.4	I-55 / I-70 / US 40 – Chicago, St. Louis	I-55 / I-70 exit 6
Madison	Pontoon Beach	9.2	14.8	IL 162 – Granite City, Troy	
Madison	Pontoon Beach	11.8	19.0	I-270 – St. Charles, Effingham	I-270 exit 6
Madison	Pontoon Beach	12.1	19.5	Historic US 66 (Chain of Rocks Road)	
Madison	Wood River	19.0	30.6	IL 143 – Alton, Edwardsville	
Madison	Wood River	20.5	33.0	IL 255 – Alton	IL 255 exit 8
Madison	Bethalto	22.6	36.4	IL 140 east – Bethalto	South end of IL 140 concurrency
Madison	Bethalto	22.9	36.9	IL 255 – Godfrey	IL 255 exit 10
Madison	Alton	26.5	42.6	IL 3 south / IL 140 west – Granite City	North end of IL 140 concurrency; south end of IL 3 concurrency
Madison	Godfrey	30.3	48.8	IL 3 north – Grafton	North end of IL 3 concurrency
Madison	Godfrey	30.9	49.7	US 67 south – Alton	South end of US 67 concurrency
Madison	Godfrey	33.4	53.8	US 67 north / IL 267 – Jerseyville	North end of US 67 concurrency; south end of IL 267 concurrency
Madison	Godfrey	33.6	54.1	IL 255	
Jersey	No major junctions				
Macoupin		44.5	71.6	IL 16 – Jerseyville, Gillespie	
Macoupin	Medora	48.7	78.4	IL 267 north – Jacksonville	North end of IL 267 concurrency
Macoupin		60.0	96.6	IL 108 east – Carlinville	South end of IL 108 concurrency
Macoupin		60.9	98.0	IL 108 west – Carrollton	North end of IL 108 concurrency
Morgan	Waverly	82.18	132.26	IL 104 – Jacksonville, Taylorville	
1.000 mi = 1.609 km; 1.000 km = 0.621 mi: Concurrency terminus
