= Macoupin Creek =

- Location of the mouth within Illinois Macoupin Creek (the United States)

Physical characteristics
- Source
  - location: Montgomery County west of Morrisonville
  - coordinates: 39°24′39″N 89°34′48″W
- Mouth
  - location: Confluence with the Illinois River near Hardin
  - coordinates: 39°10′47″N 90°35′55″W
  - elevation: 420 ft (130 m)
- Length: 99.7 mi (160.5 km)
- Discharge
  - location: Kane, Illinois
  - average: 568 cu/ft. per sec.

Basin features
- GNIS ID: 412812

Macoupin Creek is a 99.7-mile-long (160.5 km) tributary of the Illinois River, which it joins near the village of Hardin, Illinois.

The word macoupin refers to the yellow pond lily (Nuphar advena), a native plant of the regional wetlands, and a favorite food source of local Indians. It has a large rootstock (a tuber) that was baked in a fire pit. The spelling is derived from French attempts at documenting the pronunciation of the Miami-Illinois macopina, with macoupin being the modern form of the earlier French macopine.

Macoupin Creek has been channelized near its junction with the Illinois River. A straight channel cuts through old oxbows on a direct path to the river. The old channel meanders through the Illinois bottoms for about 5 miles (8 km) before joining the river, near the village of Hardin. The two channels thus form an island, called Macoupin Island, across the Illinois River from Hardin.

The old channel of Macoupin Creek forms the northwestern boundary between Greene and Jersey Counties. The actual boundary is ambiguous because of the shifting creek.

The creek is about 100 miles (160 km) in length. The lower 23 miles (37 km) of the creek runs in a narrow valley, usually less than a mile wide, between steep bluffs that rise up to 180 feet (55 m) high. The bottom of the valley is mainly flat, and has little or no gradient in the downstream direction. The modern channel runs in a straight line, with little evidence of old oxbows. This portion of Macoupin Creek therefore appears to be a drainage ditch that was dug through a swamp or a marsh, that had no well-defined natural channel. This matches with old accounts that this area was a wetland, with natural lakes, and vast amounts of growing macoupin.

== Cities, towns and counties ==
The following cities, towns and villages are drained by Macoupin Creek:

- Carlinville
- Farmersville
- Girard
- Greenfield
- Kane
- Medora
- Palmyra
- Royal Lakes
- Shipman

Parts of the following counties are in the Macoupin Creek watershed:

- Greene County
- Jersey County
- Montgomery County
- Macoupin County

== Parks and access points ==
- Beaver Dam State Park

== Lakes and impoundments ==
- Bunn Lake
- Carlinville Lake
- New Gillespie Lake
- Otter Lake
- Sunset Lake

== See also ==
- List of Illinois rivers
