= Carlinville, Illinois =

- City
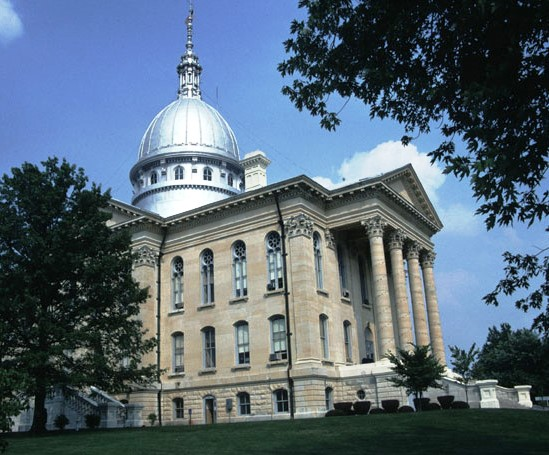
- Macoupin County Courthouse in Carlinville
- Interactive map of Carlinville, Illinois
- Location within Illinois Location within the United States
- Coordinates: 39°16′00″N 89°51′56″W
- Country: United States
- State: Illinois
- County: Macoupin
- Townships: Carlinville; Brushy Mound
- Founded: 1829
- Named for: Thomas Carlin

Area
  - Total: 3.37 sq mi (8.72 km^{2})
  - Land: 3.37 sq mi (8.72 km^{2})
- Elevation: 620 ft (190 m)

Population (2020)
  - Total: 5,710
  - Density: 1,695.1/sq mi (654.48/km^{2})
- Time zone: UTC-6 (CST)
  - Summer (DST): UTC-5 (CDT)
- ZIP code: 62626
- Area code: 217
- FIPS code: 17-11202
- GNIS feature ID: 2393743
- Website: www.cityofcarlinville.com

Carlinville is a city in and the county seat of Macoupin County, Illinois, United States. As of the 2020 census, the population was 5,710.

It is the home of Blackburn College, a small college affiliated with the Presbyterian church. The city is the former home of Prairie Farms Dairy.

== History ==
Carlinville is named for Thomas Carlin, seventh governor of Illinois, who as a member of the state legislature was instrumental in creating Macoupin County.

Carlinville has long been a site of Illinois history, and played host to many presidential hopefuls via campaign stops at a time in American history when railway routes produced many visits by politicians. Perhaps the largest and most important hallmark of Carlinville's history is its courthouse, the largest built outside of New York City at the time of its erection. Built in 1870 and designed by famous state capitol building architect Elijah E. Myers, the construction of Carlinville's courthouse produced its candidacy for the location of the state capitol. Locally, it is known as "The Million Dollar Courthouse" due to its cost overruns at the time it was built.

In the early 1900s Carlinville became the site of a great many Sears Catalog Homes. An entire neighborhood was constructed of the homes and was funded, in 1918, by Standard Oil of Indiana for its mineworkers in Carlinville, at a cost of approximately one million dollars. In gratitude, Sears, Roebuck named one of its house models the "Carlin". Today 149 of the original 156 homes still exist, the largest single repository of Sears Catalog Homes in the United States.

One notable resident of Carlinville was American entomologist Charles Robertson, who carried out what is still the single most intensive study of flower-visiting insects of a single locality (Carlinville), culminating in a 221-page book published in 1928 under the title Flowers and Insects. From among the specimens he collected in the process of doing this study, he named over 100 new species of bees and wasps. Scientists in 1970–1972 did a similar survey, and found that most of the bees noted by Robertson were still present. This is presumably due to the existence of bee habitat in hedgerows, on slopes, and in other non-agricultural land in the survey area.

Other notable Carlinville citizens include nature writer and novelist Mary Hunter Austin, once called "the most intelligent woman in America" by H.G. Wells, distinguished military personnel, politicians, and others.

== Geography ==
Carlinville is in central Macoupin County. Illinois Routes 4 and 108 pass through the city center, joining as East 1st South Street through the city's east side. Route 4 leads north-northeast 40 miles (64 km) to Springfield, the state capital, and south 21 miles (34 km) to Staunton, while Route 108 leads east 13 miles (21 km) to Interstate 55 and west 29 miles (47 km) to Carrollton.

According to the U.S. Census Bureau, Carlinville has a total area of 3.37 square miles (8.7 km^{2}), all land. Briar Creek passes through the east side of the city, joining Macoupin Creek just south of the city limits. Macoupin Creek is a west-flowing tributary of the Illinois River.

=== Climate ===
Climate data for Carlinville, Illinois, 1991–2020 normals, extremes 1893–2022
Month	Jan	Feb	Mar	Apr	May	Jun	Jul	Aug	Sep	Oct	Nov	Dec	Year
Record high °F (°C)	74 (23)	82 (28)	91 (33)	92 (33)	99 (37)	106 (41)	113 (45)	110 (43)	105 (41)	95 (35)	84 (29)	74 (23)	113 (45)
Mean daily maximum °F (°C)	36.1 (2.3)	41.3 (5.2)	52.1 (11.2)	65.1 (18.4)	74.1 (23.4)	82.9 (28.3)	86.2 (30.1)	85.0 (29.4)	79.2 (26.2)	67.0 (19.4)	52.9 (11.6)	40.9 (4.9)	63.6 (17.5)
Daily mean °F (°C)	27.7 (−2.4)	32.2 (0.1)	42.1 (5.6)	54.0 (12.2)	63.8 (17.7)	72.8 (22.7)	76.1 (24.5)	74.3 (23.5)	67.1 (19.5)	55.4 (13.0)	43.0 (6.1)	32.8 (0.4)	53.4 (11.9)
Mean daily minimum °F (°C)	19.2 (−7.1)	23.0 (−5.0)	32.2 (0.1)	42.9 (6.1)	53.5 (11.9)	62.6 (17.0)	66.0 (18.9)	63.6 (17.6)	55.1 (12.8)	43.9 (6.6)	33.2 (0.7)	24.6 (−4.1)	43.3 (6.3)
Record low °F (°C)	−22 (−30)	−23 (−31)	−12 (−24)	16 (−9)	26 (−3)	37 (3)	44 (7)	38 (3)	25 (−4)	14 (−10)	−4 (−20)	−20 (−29)	−23 (−31)
Average precipitation inches (mm)	2.28 (58)	2.09 (53)	2.90 (74)	4.67 (119)	4.27 (108)	4.64 (118)	3.44 (87)	3.24 (82)	3.32 (84)	3.31 (84)	3.53 (90)	2.32 (59)	40.01 (1,016)
Average snowfall inches (cm)	5.8 (15)	4.7 (12)	2.3 (5.8)	0.0 (0.0)	0.0 (0.0)	0.0 (0.0)	0.0 (0.0)	0.0 (0.0)	0.0 (0.0)	0.0 (0.0)	0.9 (2.3)	2.8 (7.1)	16.5 (42.2)
Average precipitation days (≥ 0.01 in)	8.5	7.1	9.0	11.4	11.3	9.4	8.1	7.3	8.1	8.9	8.0	7.8	104.9
Average snowy days (≥ 0.1 in)	3.4	1.7	1.2	0.0	0.0	0.0	0.0	0.0	0.0	0.0	0.5	1.4	8.2
Source 1: NOAA
Source 2: National Weather Service

== Demographics ==
Historical population
Census	Pop.	Note	%±
1880	3,117		—
1890	3,293		5.6%
1900	3,502		6.3%
1910	3,616		3.3%
1920	5,212		44.1%
1930	4,144		−20.5%
1940	4,965		19.8%
1950	5,116		3.0%
1960	5,440		6.3%
1970	5,675		4.3%
1980	5,439		−4.2%
1990	5,416		−0.4%
2000	5,685		5.0%
2010	5,917		4.1%
2020	5,710		−3.5%
U.S. Decennial Census

=== 2020 census ===
As of the 2020 census, Carlinville had a population of 5,710. The median age was 38.6 years. 20.9% of residents were under the age of 18 and 20.0% of residents were 65 years of age or older. For every 100 females there were 93.5 males, and for every 100 females age 18 and over there were 88.3 males age 18 and over.

96.2% of residents lived in urban areas, while 3.8% lived in rural areas.

There were 2,353 households in Carlinville, of which 28.1% had children under the age of 18 living in them. Of all households, 40.2% were married-couple households, 20.0% were households with a male householder and no spouse or partner present, and 31.8% were households with a female householder and no spouse or partner present. About 36.8% of all households were made up of individuals and 17.4% had someone living alone who was 65 years of age or older.

There were 2,564 housing units, of which 8.2% were vacant. The homeowner vacancy rate was 3.2% and the rental vacancy rate was 7.4%.

Racial composition as of the 2020 census
Race	Number	Percent
White	5,166	90.5%
Black or African American	123	2.2%
American Indian and Alaska Native	20	0.4%
Asian	48	0.8%
Native Hawaiian and Other Pacific Islander	0	0.0%
Some other race	29	0.5%
Two or more races	324	5.7%
Hispanic or Latino (of any race)	74	1.3%

=== 2000 census ===
As of the census of 2000, there were 5,685 people, 2,125 households, and 1,393 families residing in the city. The population density was 2,390 inhabitants per square mile (920/km^{2}). There were 2,289 housing units at an average density of 962.3 per square mile (371.5/km^{2}). The racial makeup of the city was 97.01% White, 1.50% African American, 0.25% Native American, 0.26% Asian, 0.02% Pacific Islander, 0.23% from other races, and 0.74% from two or more races. Hispanic or Latino of any race were 0.76% of the population.

There were 2,125 households, of which 31.1% had children under the age of 18 living with them, 50.3% were married couples living together, 11.3% had a female householder with no husband present, and 34.4% were non-families. 30.1% of all households were made up of individuals, and 15.9% had someone living alone who was 65 years of age or older. The average household size was 2.38 and the average family size was 2.96.

In the city, the population was spread out, with 23.4% under the age of 18, 12.8% from 18 to 24, 25.1% from 25 to 44, 19.4% from 45 to 64, and 19.4% who were 65 years of age or older. The median age was 37 years. For every 100 females, there were 89.7 males. For every 100 females age 18 and over, there were 84.1 males.

The median income for a household in the city was $34,259, and the median income for a family was $39,693. Males had a median income of $35,137 versus $21,286 for females. The per capita income for the city was $16,663. About 9.0% of families and 12.5% of the population were below the poverty line, including 15.3% of those under age 18 and 14.6% of those age 65 or over.

== Transportation ==
Illinois Route 4 passes north to south through Carlinville. Interstate 55 passes 12 miles (19 km) east of the city. Illinois Route 108 passes through Carlinville connecting Interstate 55 to the east with Kampsville to the west, where it crosses the Illinois River on a free, state-operated ferry.

The Carlinville Amtrak station is served directly by five daily trains, offering easy access south to St. Louis and north to Springfield and Chicago. One train is the Texas Eagle which connects Chicago to Texas and features sleeping cars, a dining car and a lounge.

Freight rail service is provided by the Union Pacific Railroad, formerly the Gulf, Mobile and Ohio, the Illinois Central Gulf, the Chicago, Missouri and Western, and the Southern Pacific Chicago - St. Louis Railways. The main line of the GM&O passed through Carlinville.

The Illinois Terminal Railroad, an electric interurban to St. Louis from Springfield that once provided both freight and passenger service, passed down the middle of Carlinville's West Street. It was still operating freight trains on West Street to a nearby grain elevator into the 1970s. Its trestle crossing Goat Hollow south of Carlinville burned severing the line, which was then abandoned. A small portion of the line is used by Monterey Coal Co. mine to connect with the former Chicago and North Western Transportation Company L & M District, serving coal-fired power plants.

== Notable people ==
- Walter Stratton Anderson (1881–1981), U.S. Navy vice admiral
- Mary Hunter Austin (1868–1934), writer
- Dana J. Boente (1954– ), General Counsel of the FBI and former Acting Attorney General of the United States
- William A. Boring (1859–1934), architect
- Frank W. Burton (1857–1934), Illinois state legislator and judge
- Kelsey Card (1992- ), Olympic discus thrower
- Louis P. Daley (1868–1930), Illinois state representative
- Vince Demuzio (1941–2004), Illinois state senator and chairman of the Illinois Democratic Party
- Palemon Howard Dorsett (1862–1943), horticulturalist
- Cornelius J. Doyle (1871–1938), Illinois Secretary of State
- David Gore (1823–1911), Illinois state senator and State Auditor
- Mark Juergensmeyer (1940– ), religious scholar
- Truman H. Landon (1905–1986), U.S. Air Force general
- Louis John Lanzerotti (1938- ), research professor of physics, New Jersey Institute of Technology
- Gustave Loehr (1864–1918), co-founder of Rotary International
- Peter F. Mack Jr. (1916–1986), congressman from Illinois
- William Moise (1922–1980), artist
- William L. Mounts (1862–1929), Illinois state legislator, lawyer, and mayor of Carlinville
- John M. Palmer (1817–1900), 15th Governor of Illinois
- John McAuley Palmer (1870–1955), U.S. Army general
- Charles Robertson (1858–1935), entomologist
- Richard Rowett (1830–1887), Civil War officer and horse breeder
- W. O. Woods (1873–1951), Treasurer of the United States
