= Protection of the Holy Virgin Mary Orthodox Church =

The Protection of the Holy Virgin Mary Orthodox Church
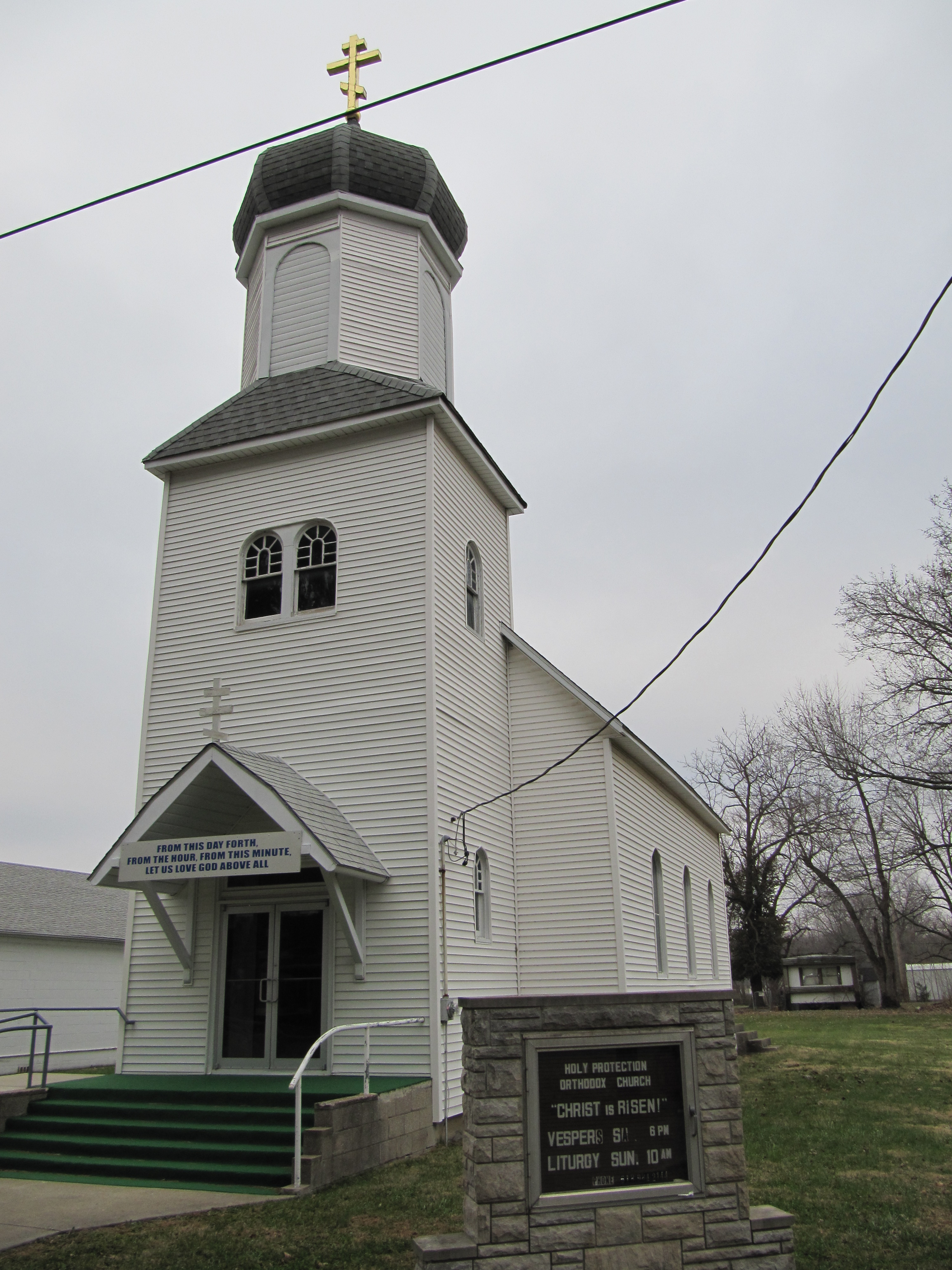

- Location within Illinois Location within the United States
- 37.881885268598715°N 89.11035301933485°W
- Location: 112 N. Fairdale Street, Royalton, IL
- Country: United States
- Denomination: Russian Orthodox
- Website: https://www.phvm.org/

History
- Founded: 1914
- Founder(s): Frank Derbak, John August and Paul Andrews
- Dedication: 1915

Architecture
- Groundbreaking: October 14, 1914
- Construction cost: $2,200 (1914)

Administration
- Diocese: American Carpatho-Russian Orthodox Diocese

Clergy
- Rector: Rev. John Pawelchak

The Protection of the Holy Virgin Mary Orthodox Church in Royalton, IL is one of the only remaining Russian Orthodox churches in southern Illinois. The church was founded by eastern European immigrants, including Rusyns, Ukrainians, Polish, Latvians, and Russians, many of whom worked in local coal mines The three principal founders were Frank Derbak (born in Kolochava), John August and Paul Andrews, with supporting founders Ivan Matichin, Ivan Drozd, Ivan Shender and Ivan Lapko. Ground was broken on October 14, 1914, the same day as the Feast of the Protection of the Theotokos. It was built to mimic the construction of the now-closed St. Ioasaph's in Muddy. Each parishioners family was asked to give $25 at the start of construction and was asked to give another $25 when the construction was finished.

The church opened to parishioners in late 1915.

On October 27, 1914, there was an explosion at the nearby Royalton North No. 1 Mine, killing over 100 miners. Thirteen of the miners who were killed in the disaster were members of the church. There is a memorial at the church, and many of the miners were buried in a cemetery dedicated to the disaster. The mining company donated land north of Royalaton to bury the miners, and became St. Mary’s Russian Orthodox Cemetery. Each year, on October 27 a panachida is celebrated in remembrance of the thirteen parishioners who were killed.

The nearby village of Dowell also had a Russian Orthodox Church, Saints Peter and Paul, but it has since closed. A memorial to the closed Dowell church is located in at the Holy Protection church.

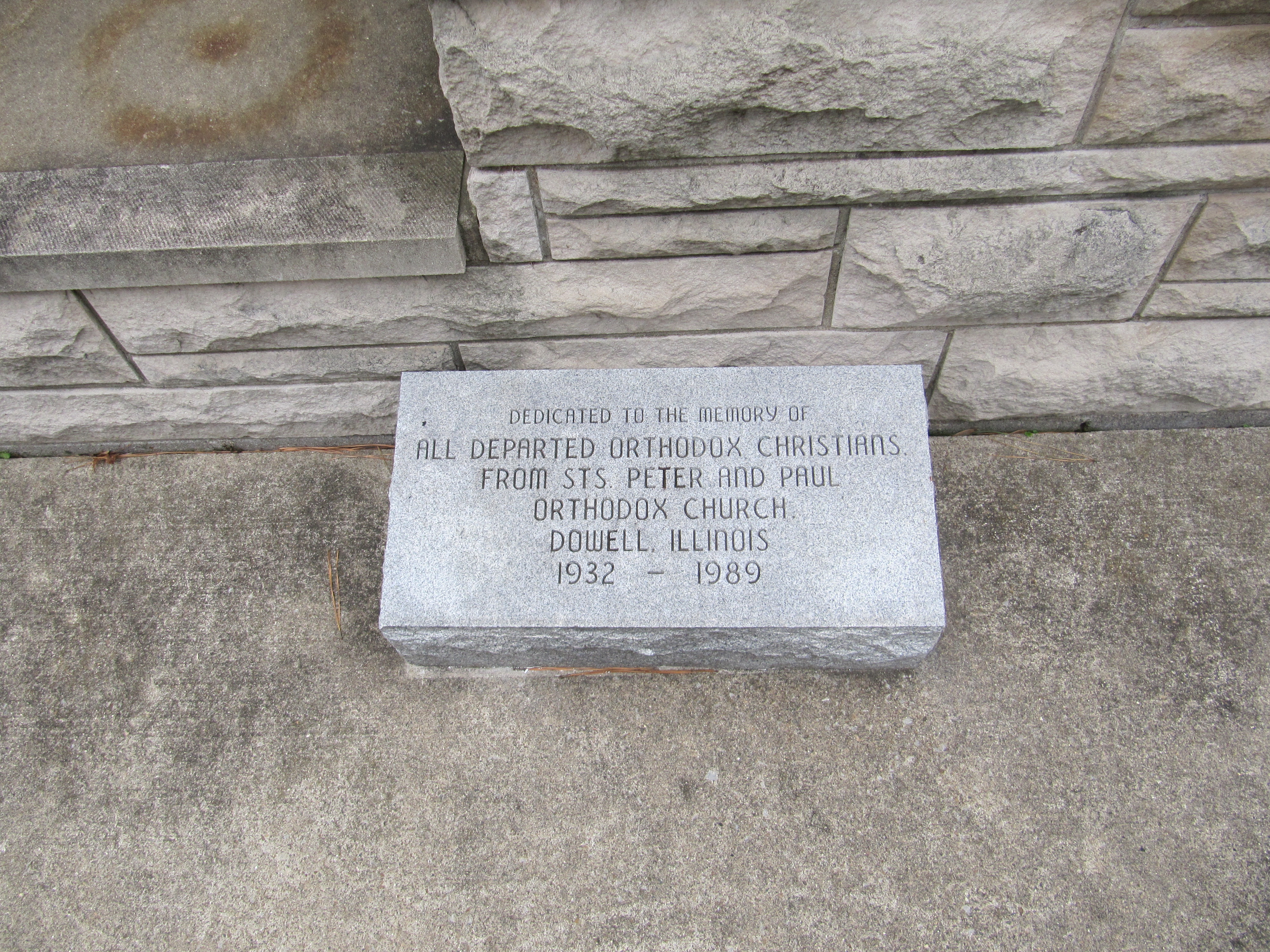
Memorial to the former Dowell Saints Peter and Paul Russian Orthodox Church, located at the Holy Protection Russian Orthodox church in Royalton

Other southern Illinois villages with Orthodox churches included St. Mary's Russian Orthodox Church in Benld, Buckner, and Grand Tower.

== Style ==
The church is a Byzantine-style domed church with a white and gold interior. The church contains traditional Orthodox iconography, some by the hand of the iconographer Alexander Sokolov, as well as a grotto with a mosaic of the Theotokos.

Next to the church is located a church hall and rectory.
