= Buckner, Illinois =

- Village
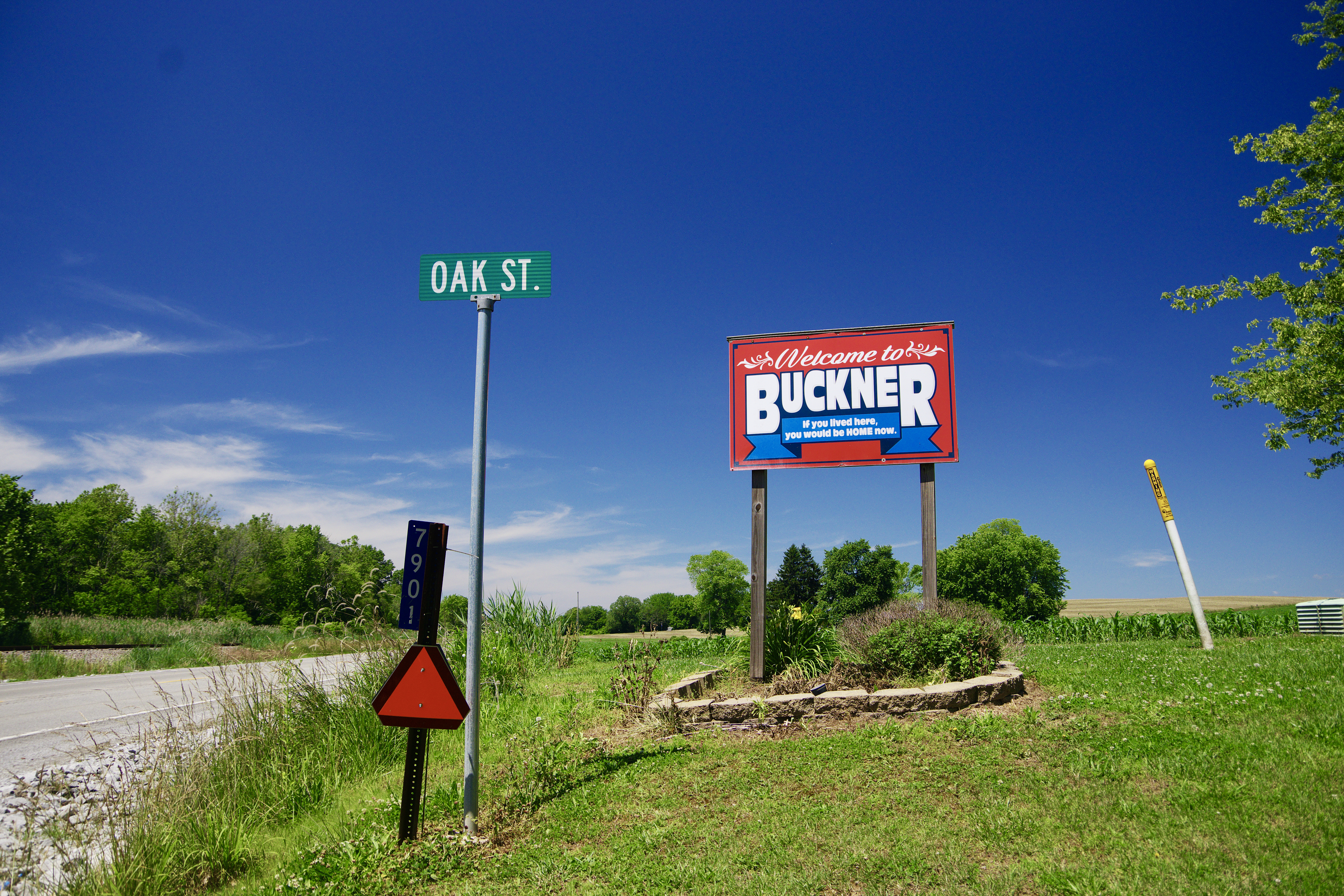
- Welcome sign along IL 14

- Location of Buckner in Franklin County, Illinois.
- Coordinates: 37°58′51″N 89°00′55″W
- Country: United States
- State: Illinois
- County: Franklin
- Township: Browning

Area
  - Total: 0.89 sq mi (2.31 km^{2})
  - Land: 0.87 sq mi (2.26 km^{2})
  - Water: 0.019 sq mi (0.05 km^{2})
- Elevation: 397 ft (121 m)

Population (2020)
  - Total: 409
  - Density: 469.2/sq mi (181.14/km^{2})
- Time zone: UTC-6 (CST)
  - Summer (DST): UTC-5 (CDT)
- Zip code: 62819
- Area code: 618
- FIPS code: 17-09330
- GNIS feature ID: 2397487
- Website: villageofbuckner.org

Buckner is a village in Franklin County, Illinois, United States. The population was 409 at the 2020 census. The current mayor is Aaron Eubanks.

== History ==
The village was named after American Civil War Union veteran Moses Buckner (b. February 11, 1827, d. April 17, 1882), who served in the 15th Regiment Illinois Volunteer Cavalry.

United Coal Mine No. 2 opened in 1911 in Buckner under the ownership of the United Coal Mining Company (later the United Coal Corporation). The mine was sold to the Old Ben Coal Corporation in 1960, and renamed Old Ben Coal Mine No. 14. Eight men were killed in an explosion in 1915, and one man was killed in a gas explosion in 1931. The mine was idle in 1933. Its last production was 1960.

The opening of the mines attracted immigrant workers. A large number of miners arrived, many of them from Austria-Hungary, Poland, Czechoslovakia and many of Lemko and Rusyn origin. Many early immigrants trace their roots to the village of Myscowa in Poland.

The mining community built a Russian Orthodox Church in 1913, which burned down in 1918. A second church was constructed. This church, the Nativity of the Virgin Mary, still stands today. It was built to mimic the construction of St. Ioasaph's in Muddy.

Along with the still standing Holy Protection Church in Royalton, and St Mary's Orthodox Church in Madison, this church in Buckner was among the first of several Orthodox churches built to serve immigrant mining communities in southern Illinois. Others included the towns of Benld, Grand Tower, and Dowell.

This village had a number of taverns and nightclubs and was known as one of the biggest entertainment areas of Franklin County from the 1950s to the early 1980s. in 2023 the last restaurant closed leaving only the liquor store left. In 2025 the restaurant reopened under a new name & company.

== Geography ==
Buckner is located in west-central Franklin County. Illinois Route 14 passes through the village, leading east 5.5 miles (8.9 km) to Benton, the county seat, and west 2 miles (3 km) to Christopher.

According to the 2021 census gazetteer files, Buckner has a total area of 0.89 square miles (2.31 km^{2}), of which 0.87 square miles (2.25 km^{2}) (or 97.65%) is land and 0.02 square miles (0.05 km^{2}) (or 2.35%) is water.

== Demographics ==
Historical population
Census	Pop.	Note	%±
1920	1,827		—
1930	1,409		−22.9%
1940	927		−34.2%
1950	783		−15.5%
1960	610		−22.1%
1970	489		−19.8%
1980	520		6.3%
1990	478		−8.1%
2000	479		0.2%
2010	462		−3.5%
2020	409		−11.5%
U.S. Decennial Census

As of the 2020 census there were 409 people, 151 households, and 89 families residing in the village. The population density was 458.01 inhabitants per square mile (176.84/km^{2}). There were 211 housing units at an average density of 236.28 per square mile (91.23/km^{2}). The racial makeup of the village was 92.18% White, 0.24% African American, 0.00% Native American, 0.00% Asian, 0.00% Pacific Islander, 0.49% from other races, and 7.09% from two or more races. Hispanic or Latino of any race were 0.98% of the population.

There were 151 households, out of which 23.8% had children under the age of 18 living with them, 45.03% were married couples living together, 12.58% had a female householder with no husband present, and 41.06% were non-families. 35.10% of all households were made up of individuals, and 16.56% had someone living alone who was 65 years of age or older. The average household size was 3.00 and the average family size was 2.30.

The village's age distribution consisted of 19.8% under the age of 18, 12.4% from 18 to 24, 27.3% from 25 to 44, 18.7% from 45 to 64, and 21.8% who were 65 years of age or older. The median age was 41.7 years. For every 100 females, there were 108.4 males. For every 100 females age 18 and over, there were 97.9 males.

The median income for a household in the village was $38,542, and the median income for a family was $45,938. Males had a median income of $35,938 versus $22,813 for females. The per capita income for the village was $21,907. About 11.2% of families and 16.7% of the population were below the poverty line, including 44.4% of those under age 18 and 2.6% of those age 65 or over.
