= St. Ioasaph Orthodox Church =

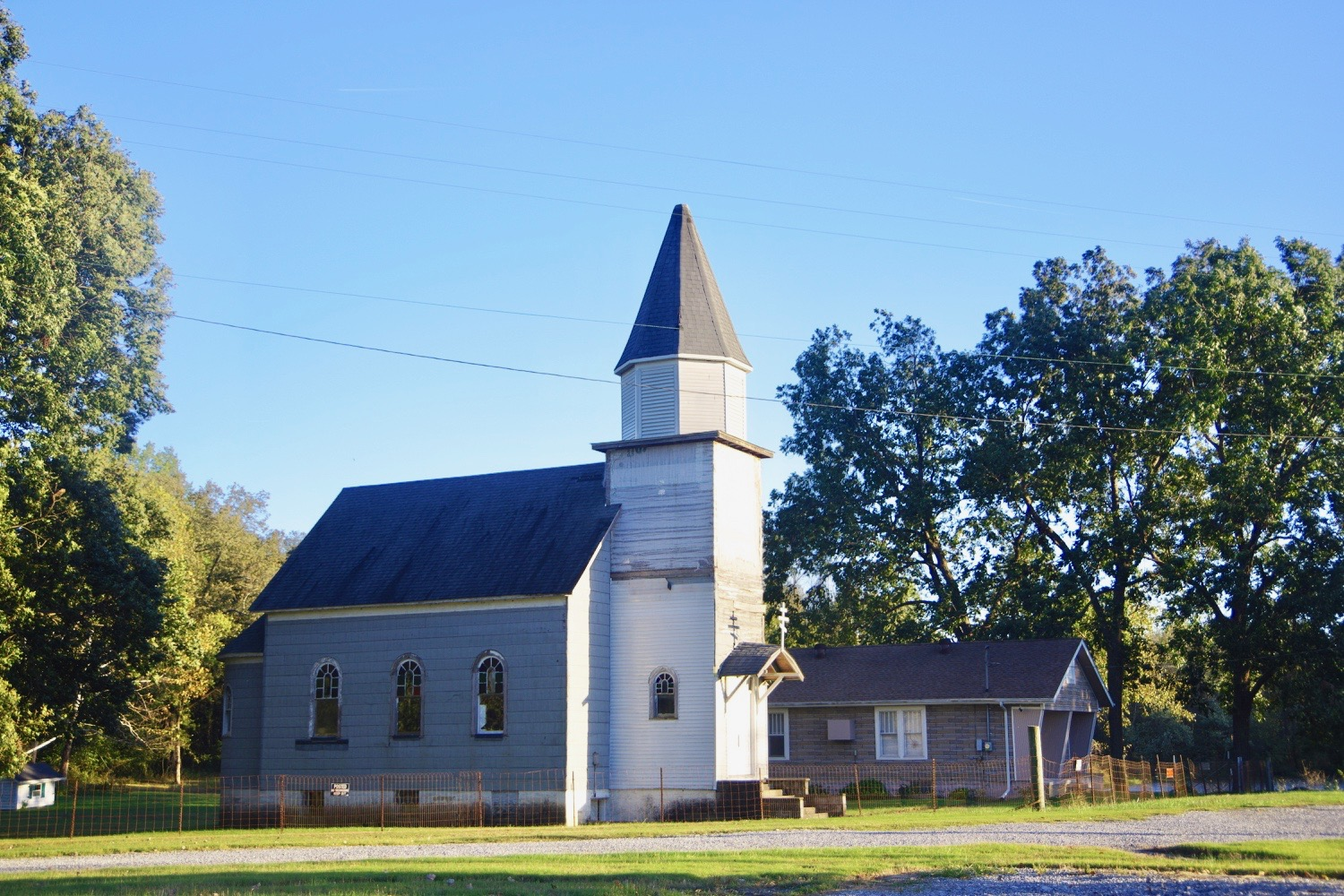

- Location within Illinois Location within the United States
- 37.7655985°N 88.5249862°W
- Location: South St, Harrisburg, IL
- Country: United States
- Denomination: Russian Orthodox

History
- Founded: 1913

Architecture
- Groundbreaking: 1911
- Completed: 1913
- Demolished: 2019

Administration
- Diocese: American Carpatho-Russian Orthodox Diocese

St. Ioasaph Orthodox Church, also known as St. Ioasaph's, was a historic Russian Orthodox church in Muddy, Illinois. It was founded in 1911 and completed in 1913.

== History ==
Carpatho-Rusyn immigrants constructed the church in 1913 to serve the growing mining community of nearby Muddy. The church was built in honor of the recently canonized saint, Joasaph of Belgorod, and funds were provided by Czar Nicholas II. It initially served 60 families.

Along with the Holy Protection Church in Royalton (which was built to mimic St. Ioasaphs), St Mary's Orthodox Church in Madison, St. Iosaph's was among the first of several Orthodox churches built to serve immigrant mining communities in southern Illinois. Others included St. Mary's Russian Orthodox Church in Benld, Buckner, Grand Tower, and Dowell.

After years of disuse, the church was dismantled in 2019. Several icons were relocated to St. Basil, the Great Orthodox Church in St. Louis. The last service was held at St. Ioasaph's in 2017.
