= Grand Tower =

Grand Tower may refer to:

== Places ==
- Grand Tower, Illinois
- Grand Tower Island
- Tower Rock, Mississippi

== Buildings and structures ==
- Grand Tower (Frankfurt am Main)
- Grand Tower (Moscow)
- Grand Tower Pipeline Bridge
- The Shang Grand Tower
