= Mount Clare, Illinois =

- Village
- Location in Macoupin County, Illinois
- Coordinates: 39°5′59″N 89°49′19″W
- Country: United States
- State: Illinois
- County: Macoupin
- Township: Gillespie

Area
  - Total: 1.58 sq mi (4.09 km^{2})
  - Land: 1.54 sq mi (3.98 km^{2})
  - Water: 0.039 sq mi (0.10 km^{2})
- Elevation: 630 ft (190 m)

Population (2020)
  - Total: 311
  - Density: 202.2/sq mi (78.06/km^{2})
- Time zone: UTC-6 (CST)
  - Summer (DST): UTC-5 (CDT)
- ZIP codes: 62033 (Gillespie); 62009 (Benld)
- Area code: 217
- FIPS code: 17-50920
- GNIS feature ID: 2399408

Mount Clare is a village in Macoupin County, Illinois, United States. Its population was 311 at the 2020 census.

== Geography ==
Mount Clare is located in southeastern Macoupin County and is bordered to the east by the city of Benld, and Gillespie is 2 miles (3 km) to the north. Illinois Route 4 runs north–south through the east side of the village, while Illinois Route 138 leads southwest 3 miles (5 km) to Wilsonville.

According to the 2021 census gazetteer files, Mount Clare has a total area of 1.58 square miles (4.09 km^{2}), of which 1.54 square miles (3.99 km^{2}) (or 97.53%) is land and 0.04 square miles (0.10 km^{2}) (or 2.47%) is water. The village is drained by the headwaters of Big Branch, a south-flowing tributary of Cahokia Creek, which runs to the Mississippi River northeast of St. Louis.

== Demographics ==
Historical population
Census	Pop.	Note	%±
1940	331		—
1950	260		−21.5%
1960	320		23.1%
1970	298		−6.9%
1980	300		0.7%
1990	297		−1.0%
2000	433		45.8%
2010	278		−35.8%
2020	311		11.9%
U.S. Decennial Census

As of the 2020 census there were 311 people, 133 households, and 70 families residing in the village. The population density was 197.21 inhabitants per square mile (76.14/km^{2}). There were 139 housing units at an average density of 88.14 per square mile (34.03/km^{2}). The racial makeup of the village was 97.11% White, 0.00% African American, 0.00% Native American, 0.00% Asian, 0.00% Pacific Islander, 0.00% from other races, and 2.89% from two or more races. Hispanic or Latino of any race were 0.00% of the population.

There were 133 households, out of which 21.8% had children under the age of 18 living with them, 39.10% were married couples living together, 12.03% had a female householder with no husband present, and 47.37% were non-families. 39.85% of all households were made up of individuals, and 18.80% had someone living alone who was 65 years of age or older. The average household size was 2.86 and the average family size was 2.22.

The village's age distribution consisted of 18.6% under the age of 18, 2.7% from 18 to 24, 20.1% from 25 to 44, 15.7% from 45 to 64, and 43.0% who were 65 years of age or older. The median age was 57.3 years. For every 100 females, there were 86.9 males. For every 100 females age 18 and over, there were 78.1 males.

The median income for a household in the village was $31,250, and the median income for a family was $48,750. Males had a median income of $47,500 versus $18,929 for females. The per capita income for the village was $21,231. About 22.9% of families and 32.7% of the population were below the poverty line, including 56.9% of those under age 18 and 13.8% of those age 65 or over.
