= Sawyerville =

Sawyerville can refer to:

- Sawyerville, Alabama
- Sawyerville, Illinois
- Sawyerville, Quebec, a village in Cookshire-Eaton, Quebec, Canada
