= William D. Lyons =

American coal miner and politician

William D. Lyons (January 27, 1920 – August 26, 1971) was an American coal miner and politician.

== Biography ==
Lyons was born in Eagarville, Illinois and went to St. Jude School and Gillespie Community High School in Gillespie, Illinois. Lyons was a coal miner, steel worker, and was involved with the labor union. He lived with his wife and family in Gillespie, Illinois. He served on the Gillespie City Council in 1940 and was a Democrat. Lyons served in the Illinois House of Representatives from 1951 to 1957. He then served in the Illinois Senate from 1957 until his death in 1971. Lyons died from toxic hepatitis.
