= Sawyerville, Illinois =

- Village
- Location in Macoupin County, Illinois
- Coordinates: 39°04′43″N 89°48′07″W
- Country: United States
- State: Illinois
- County: Macoupin
- Township: Mount Olive

Area
  - Total: 1.00 sq mi (2.59 km^{2})
  - Land: 0.99 sq mi (2.56 km^{2})
  - Water: 0.015 sq mi (0.04 km^{2})
- Elevation: 630 ft (190 m)

Population (2020)
  - Total: 268
  - Density: 271.4/sq mi (104.78/km^{2})
- Time zone: UTC-6 (CST)
  - Summer (DST): UTC-5 (CDT)
- ZIP code: 62085
- Area code: 217
- FIPS code: 17-67873
- GNIS feature ID: 2399766

Sawyerville is a village in Macoupin County, Illinois, United States. As of the 2020 census the population was 268.

== Geography ==
Sawyerville is located in southeastern Macoupin County. It is bordered to the north by the city of Benld. Illinois Route 4 passes through the west side of the village, leading north 3.5 miles (5.6 km) to Gillespie and south 5 miles (8 km) to Staunton, while Illinois Route 138 passes through the east side of the village, leading north to its terminus in Benld and east 2.5 miles (4.0 km) to Interstate 55 at White City.

According to the 2021 census gazetteer files, Sawyerville has a total area of 1.00 square mile (2.59 km^{2}), of which 0.99 square miles (2.56 km^{2}) (or 98.60%) is land and 0.01 square miles (0.03 km^{2}) (or 1.40%) is water. An unnamed stream forming a 50-foot-deep (15.2 m) ravine splits the village into a small eastern section and larger western section. The village is part of the Cahokia Creek watershed leading southwest to the Mississippi River.

== Demographics ==
Historical population
Census	Pop.	Note	%±
1910	445		—
1920	588		32.1%
1930	501		−14.8%
1940	401		−20.0%
1950	390		−2.7%
1960	362		−7.2%
1970	315		−13.0%
1980	381		21.0%
1990	312		−18.1%
2000	295		−5.4%
2010	279		−5.4%
2020	268		−3.9%
U.S. Decennial Census

As of the 2020 census there were 268 people, 88 households, and 53 families residing in the village. The population density was 267.47 inhabitants per square mile (103.27/km^{2}). There were 125 housing units at an average density of 124.75 per square mile (48.17/km^{2}). The racial makeup of the village was 95.15% White, 0.00% African American, 0.00% Native American, 0.00% Asian, 0.00% Pacific Islander, 0.00% from other races, and 4.85% from two or more races. Hispanic or Latino of any race were 1.49% of the population.

There were 88 households, out of which 37.5% had children under the age of 18 living with them, 35.23% were married couples living together, 19.32% had a female householder with no husband present, and 39.77% were non-families. 27.27% of all households were made up of individuals, and 17.05% had someone living alone who was 65 years of age or older. The average household size was 3.51 and the average family size was 2.75.

The village's age distribution consisted of 32.6% under the age of 18, 5.8% from 18 to 24, 28.1% from 25 to 44, 19.4% from 45 to 64, and 14.0% who were 65 years of age or older. The median age was 32.5 years. For every 100 females, there were 66.9 males. For every 100 females age 18 and over, there were 81.1 males.

The median income for a household in the village was $40,556, and the median income for a family was $51,250. Males had a median income of $36,250 versus $18,571 for females. The per capita income for the village was $18,369. About 24.5% of families and 27.7% of the population were below the poverty line, including 45.3% of those under age 18 and 5.9% of those age 65 or over.
