= Royalton North No. 1 Mine Explosion =

Mining disasters in Illinois, US

Royalton North #1 Mine
- Location within Illinois
- Location: Illinois, United States; 37°53′5″N 89°6′45″W
- Products: Coal
- Opened: 1907
- Closed: 1952
- Company: Franklin Coal & Coke Company

The North #1 mine is a closed coal mine that was located in Royalton, Illinois. The Big Muddy and Carterville Coal Company opened the North #1 mine in 1907. Franklin Coal & Coke Company took over this mine in 1910, and along with its mine south of Royalton, operated two mines in Royalton. At its peak, the #1 mine (sometimes also referred to as the #7 mine) employed over 600 miners. In 1949 Lyda B mine, was opened however it closed in 1952.

== Explosion ==
On October 27, 1914, an explosion killed 52 miners. This was the worst mine disaster to date in the coal fields of southern Illinois.,. Many of the miners killed in the explosion were European immigrants. 13 of the dead miners were parishioners of the Protection of the Holy Virgin Mary Orthodox Church Royalton IL, a Russian Orthodox church in Royalton. There is a memorial at the church, and many of the miners were buried in a cemetery dedicated to the disaster. The mining company donated land north of Royalton to bury the miners, and became St. Mary's Russian Orthodox Cemetery. Each year, on October 27 a panachida is celebrated in remembrance of the thirteen parishioners who were killed.

The North #1 mine operated until September, 1951.

Miners Killed in the 1914 Explosion

B. Orlenti, Will Bater, Berti Barto, B. Merigildo, John Varga, Virgil Bondi, Dom. Ogolini, W. D. Williams, Louis Julius, Dom.Lutanski, Tony Borzoni, Neal Mullen, Pete Holupko, John Barclay, Guy Mozzellia, Steve Bolinski, Philip Parrott, Pete Cornella, Russell Harris, James Johnson, Alex Holodinak, Pete Bovnezono, I George Horuary, Charles Bellonyv, -Geopce Hayonech, A. Sholler, Pete Krelo, Alex Marce, John Smith, Felix Cetric, Sam Smiddie, Peter Young, John Babich, Harry Litkas, George Balis, Jack Kovich, Louie Sakaly, Adam Maleski, Joe Tradonas, Mike Fricosky, Joe Harnalich, Dom. Lorentro, Joe Antonacci, Tony Plusnich, Philip Micetich, Steve Shanders, Louis Benciniza, Charles Petrone, Martin Grachino, Anton Alabanskas, George Dronovich.

=== 1918 explosion ===
Another explosion occurred at the mine on September 27, 1918 killing 21 men.

Miners Killed in the 1918 Explosion

John Lee, John Hynd, Tony Furlih, A. E. Capstick, James E. Beck, Grover Capps, W. H. Holland, Anton Heberet, Wm. A. Ditterline, John Elejanczyk, W. H. Alvis, E. McCleary, Theo. F. Helm, W. J. Boatman, Robert Watts, Jettie Harris, Archie Storrie, James Dickerson, John Karloveck, Harry McLaughlin, Warren Leo Stroud.
