= Joasaph of Belgorod =

Russian Orthodox hierarch

Saint Ioasaph of Belgorod
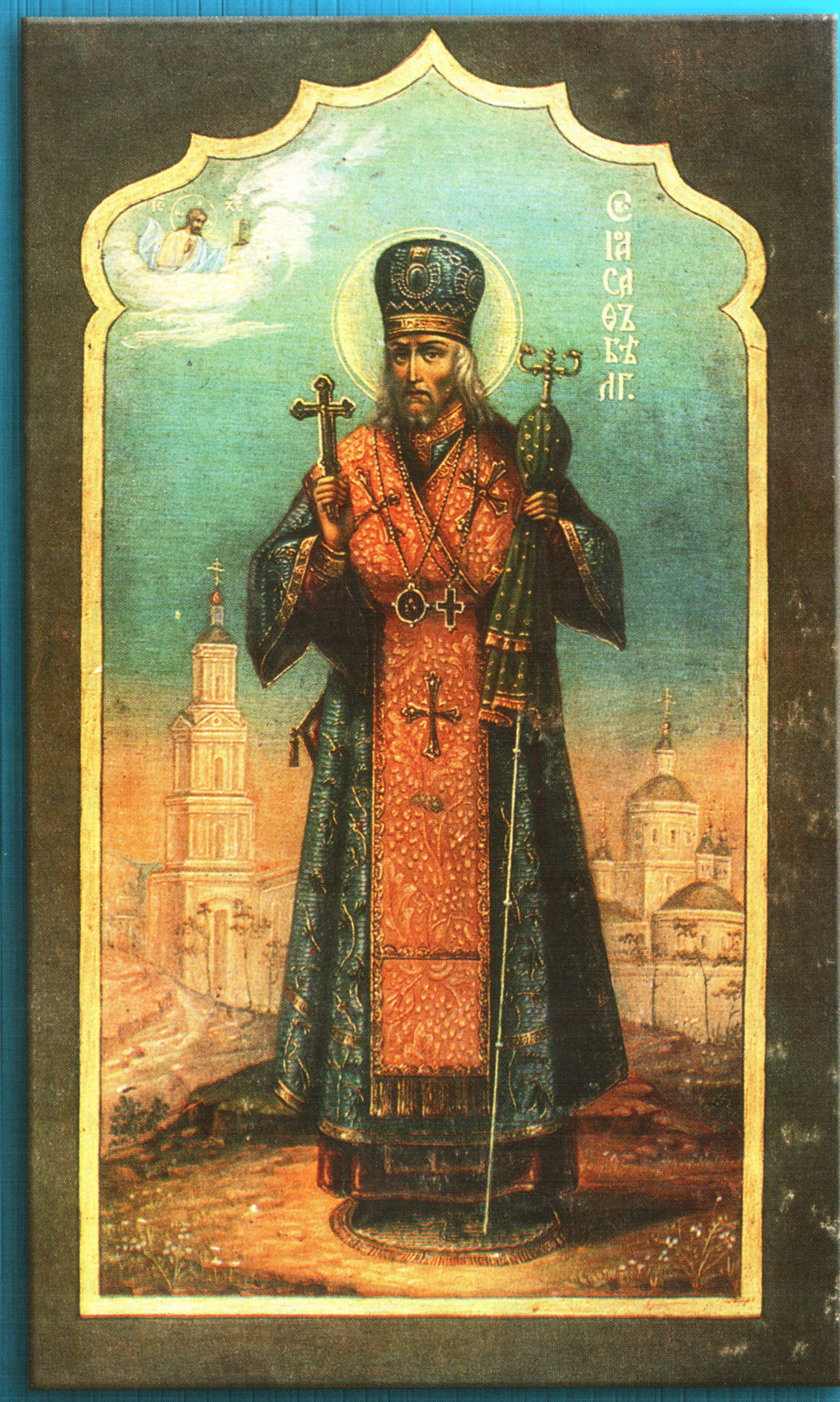

Bishop of Belgorod
- Born: 8 (19) September 1705; Priluki, Pryluky Regiment, Cossack Hetmanate, Tsardom of Russia
- Died: 10 (21) December 1754; Grayvoron, Belgorod Governorate, Russian Empire
- Venerated in: Eastern Orthodoxy
- Major shrine: Cathedral of the Transfiguration of Our Lord in Belgorod, Russia
- Feast: 10 December

Joasaph of Belgorod (Russian: Иоасаф Белгородский, Ukrainian: Йоаса́ф Бєлгородський, secular name Ioakim Andreyevich Gorlenko, Russian: Иоаким Андреевич Горленко; 8 (19) September 1705 – 10 (21) December 1754) was an 18th-century Russian Orthodox hierarch, bishop of Belgorod from 1748 until his death.

His remains were found to be incorrupt, and after many miracles he was glorified by the Eastern Orthodox Church in 1911. Stolen from his shrine in 1917, the saint's body was thought to be lost but was eventually found in storage in a museum and returned to Belgorod in 1991.

== Early life ==
Born at Priluki, in the Russian Empire's Cossack Hetmanate (present-day Ukraine), Ioachim Gorlenko was the son of Colonel Andrei Dmitrievich Gorlenko of the Pryluky Regiment, by his marriage to Maria Danylovna, a daughter of Danylo Apostol (1654–1734), a notable military leader and ruler, Hetman of the Cossack Hetmanate from 1727 until his death. The young Gorlenko thus had influential connections. After attending the Kiev Theological Academy, in 1725 he was tonsured a monk of the Mezhyhirya Monastery, under the name of Hilarion.

== Career and miracles ==
In 1727 Hilarion (as he then was) took monastic vows and received the name of Joasaph, and in 1728 he was ordained a deacon. By the end of that academic year he was teaching at the academy. In 1737 he was appointed archimandrite of the Mhar Monastery near Lubny. In 1744, by command of the Empress Elizabeth, Iosaph was advanced to the rank of archimandrite and translated to become head of the Trinity Lavra of St. Sergius, the most important Russian monastery and the spiritual centre of the Russian Orthodox Church. On 2 June 1748 he was consecrated as bishop of Belgorod and Oboyan.

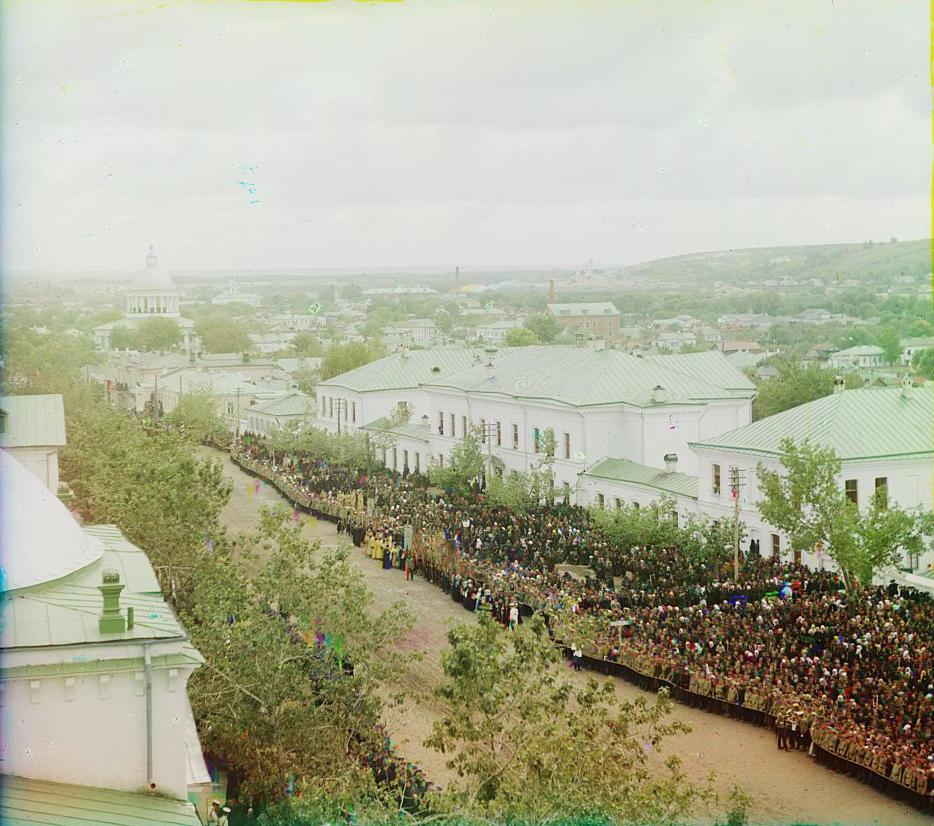
Glorification of Joasaph, Belgorod, 4 September 1911

After his arrival in Belgorod, Joasaph was noted for his untiring efforts for his diocese and especially for his work to help those in need, often visiting the poor and the sick.

He died on 10 December 1754, aged only 49, at a village in the Graivoron district. On 15 December his body was taken from there to Belgorod and was placed in his Holy Trinity Cathedral. Not until 28 February 1755 was the coffin transferred to a crypt in the cathedral which had been made on Joasaph's orders. Some years later the body was found to be incorrupt, and news of this spread. The sick began to visit the coffin of Joasaph, many reporting cures. The miraculous power of Joasaph's relics became known throughout the Russian Empire, and every year more people came to Belgorod to seek help. Joasaph thus gained the aura of a saint, and portraits of him became popular. In 1883, the Holy Trinity Cathedral became a monastery cathedral, and a series of requests for Joasaph's glorification began to be made. Finally, in 1910, Tsar Nicholas II asked the Holy Synod to glorify Joasaph as a saint, which it agreed to do. On 4 September 1911 the glorification was celebrated in the Holy Trinity Cathedral, Belgorud, attended by more than 200,000 people, many of whom had come from all over the Empire and beyond.

Before the First World War, Joasaph's relics were greatly venerated and were brought out for the curing of the sick, when great crowds came hoping for a miraculous cure. One who attended such an occasion wrote "Now, it is hard to imagine that sight: thousands and thousands of sick, bent, crippled, possessed, and blind people stood and lay on both sides of the road, along which the saint's relics were to be carried." A substantial shrine, made of silver, was created in the Holy Trinity Cathedral.

In the summer of 1914, when news came of the Austro-Hungarian monitor bombardment of the Serbian city of Belgrade beginning on 29 July 1914, one landowner, Prince Obolensky, spoke stirringly to his peasantry of the need for war with Austria, and they reacted enthusiastically. He later learned that his hearers had understood him to mean the Belgorod which held the relics of the recently glorified Joasaph.

== Loss and return of the relics ==
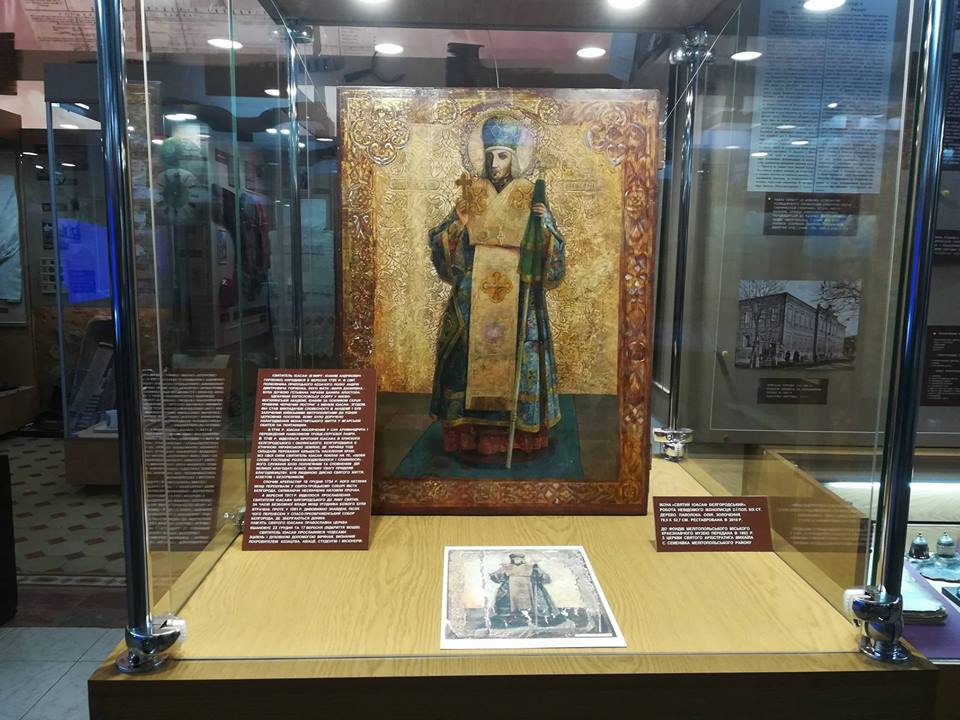
Icon of St Joasaph at an exhibition in 2018

After the October Revolution of 1917, the Bolsheviks removed Saint Joasaph's remains from his shrine in the cathedral at Belgorod, and for some seventy years their whereabouts remained unknown. In 1927 the Holy Trinity Cathedral itself was demolished. In the late 1980s the remains were discovered in the Museum of the History of Religion and Atheism of the Academy of Sciences of the USSR in Leningrad, and on 16 September 1991 they were solemnly returned to the new Cathedral of the Transfiguration of Our Lord in Belgorod, the occasion being marked by a service in which Patriarch Alexy II took part.

Joasaph's name is still revered by the Orthodox faithful, and above all by those from Ukraine.

The Feast of the Opening of the Relics of St. Joasaph, Bishop of Belgorod, is celebrated on 4/17 September and also on 10/23 December, the date of his death.

He is also commemorated on: 19 July and 1 August

== Dedications ==
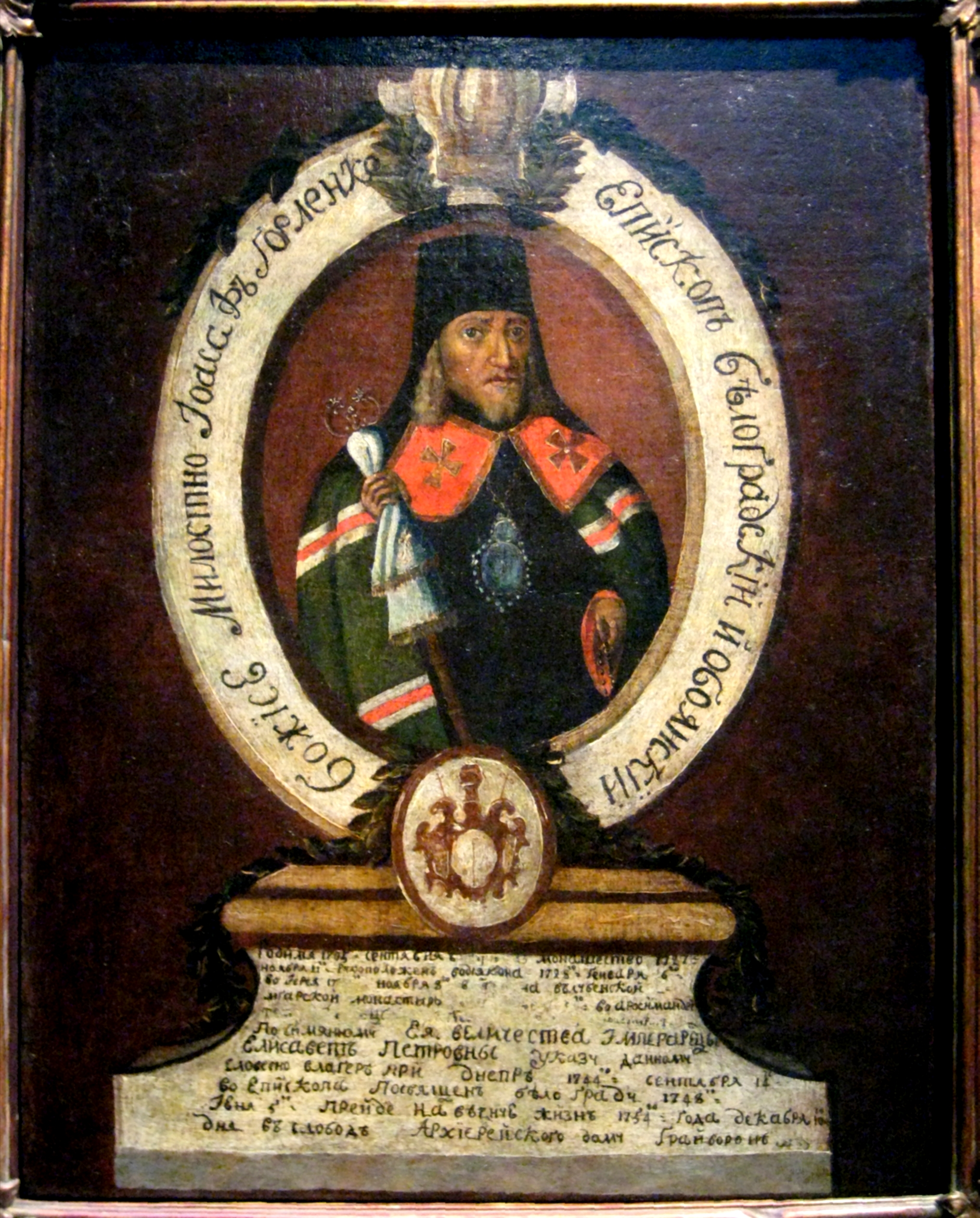
Early 19th century portrait of Joasaph

The Orthodox Church of St Iosaph in Muddy, Illinois, was built in 1913 and dedicated to the newly consecrated St Joasaph of Belgorod. The spelling "Iosaph" was chosen.

There is a Fellowship of Saint Joasaph of Belgorod in Shanghai.

In 1912 Ivan Vassilievich Skorodumov (1888–1955) was tonsured a monk and named Joasaph in honour of the newly glorified St Joasaph. He later became Archbishop Joasaph of Buenos Aires, Argentina and Paraguay.
