= Louis Eilers =

Louis Eilers was the chairperson and president of the Eastman Kodak from 1967 to 1972.

== Life and career ==
Eilers was born in Gillespie, Illinois in 1907. He attended Blackburn College and then the University of Illinois Urbana-Champaign, where he received a bachelor of science degree. Then, he joined the University of Virginia for a Master of Science degree and Northwestern University for a PhD.

Eilers joined Kodak in 1934 and became a CEO of the company in 1969. During his tenure, Kodak expanded its photography market share and developed products such as petrochemicals, plastics, and synthetic fibers.

In 1969, he received Illinois Alumni Achievement Award.
