= East Gillespie, Illinois =

- Village
- Location in Macoupin County, Illinois
- Coordinates: 39°08′16″N 89°48′46″W
- Country: United States
- State: Illinois
- County: Macoupin
- Townships: Gillespie, Cahokia

Area
  - Total: 0.32 sq mi (0.83 km^{2})
  - Land: 0.32 sq mi (0.83 km^{2})
  - Water: 0 sq mi (0.00 km^{2})
- Elevation: 663 ft (202 m)

Population (2020)
  - Total: 269
  - Density: 844.1/sq mi (325.89/km^{2})
- Time zone: UTC-6 (CST)
  - Summer (DST): UTC-5 (CDT)
- ZIP Code: 62033 (Gillespie)
- Area code: 217
- FIPS code: 17-21852
- GNIS ID: 2398776

East Gillespie is a village in Macoupin County, Illinois, United States. As of the 2020 census, the village had a population of 269.

== Geography ==
East Gillespie is located in southeastern Macoupin County and is bordered to the south by the city of Gillespie. Illinois Route 4 runs through the village, leading north 11 miles (18 km) to Carlinville, the Macoupin county seat, and south 9 miles (14 km) to Staunton. Illinois Route 16 runs through the southeast part of the village, leading northeast 9 miles (14 km) to Litchfield and west through Gillespie 29 miles (47 km) to Jerseyville.

According to the 2021 census gazetteer files, East Gillespie has a total area of 0.32 square miles (0.83 km^{2}), all land.

== Demographics ==
Historical population
Census	Pop.	Note	%±
1940	278		—
1950	224		−19.4%
1960	208		−7.1%
1970	187		−10.1%
1980	197		5.3%
1990	205		4.1%
2000	234		14.1%
2010	270		15.4%
2020	269		−0.4%
U.S. Decennial Census

As of the 2020 census there were 269 people, 114 households, and 83 families residing in the village. The population density was 843.26 inhabitants per square mile (325.58/km^{2}). There were 119 housing units at an average density of 373.04 per square mile (144.03/km^{2}). The racial makeup of the village was 93.31% White, 0.37% African American, 0.74% Native American, 1.86% Asian, 0.00% Pacific Islander, 0.00% from other races, and 3.72% from two or more races. Hispanic or Latino of any race were 1.12% of the population.

There were 114 households, out of which 16.7% had children under the age of 18 living with them, 65.79% were married couples living together, 4.39% had a female householder with no husband present, and 27.19% were non-families. 25.44% of all households were made up of individuals, and 7.02% had someone living alone who was 65 years of age or older. The average household size was 2.47 and the average family size was 2.11.

The village's age distribution consisted of 7.5% under the age of 18, 5.0% from 18 to 24, 17.2% from 25 to 44, 32.5% from 45 to 64, and 37.9% who were 65 years of age or older. The median age was 59.1 years. For every 100 females, there were 108.7 males. For every 100 females age 18 and over, there were 119.8 males.

The median income for a household in the village was $64,167, and the median income for a family was $66,875. Males had a median income of $64,583 versus $44,167 for females. The per capita income for the village was $42,426. About 1.2% of families and 5.4% of the population were below the poverty line, including 0.0% of those under age 18 and 4.4% of those age 65 or over.
