= A. C. Bartulis =

American politician and businessman (1927-2011)

Junie Bartulis

Personal details
- Born: August Charles Bartulis; December 9, 1927 Benld, Illinois
- Died: January 31, 2011 (aged 83) Carlinville, Illinois
- Resting place: Holy Cross Cemetery, Calumet City, Illinois; 39.12532°N 89.80898°W
- Party: Republican
- Children: 2

August Charles "Junie" Bartulis, Jr. (December 9, 1927 – January 31, 2011) was an American businessman and politician.

Born in Benld, Illinois, Bartulis went to the Benld public schools. He served in the United States Army shortly after World War II and during the Korean War. He owned the Wayside Garage and Service Station in Benld, Illinois. From 1967 to 1971, Bartulis served as the Macoupin County, Illinois treasurer and was a Republican. Bartulis served in the Illinois House of Representatives and the Illinois State Senate. Bartulis died at Carlinville General Hospital in Carlinville, Illinois.

== Life ==
Bartulis started his political career by being elected Maucopin county commissioner. In 1970, he won a seat in the Illinois House of Representatives 53rd district. He was redistricted to the 49th district in 1972. He also served as a senator from that district.
