= St. Mary's Russian Orthodox Church, Benld, Illinois =

St Mary's Russian Orthodox Church
- Location within Illinois Location within the United States
- 39.0952018°N 89.8045055°W
- Location: 304 N 4th St, Benld, Illinois
- Country: United States
- Denomination: Russian Orthodox
- Website: https://www.facebook.com/HolyDormitionBenldIllinois/

History
- Founded: March 3, 1907
- Founder: Andrew Sesenko

Administration
- Diocese: American Carpatho-Russian Orthodox Diocese

St. Mary's Russian Orthodox Church was a church in Benld, Illinois until 2010. Opened in 1907 by Carpatho-Rusyn immigrants, it was converted to the Holy Dormition Monastery in 2010. The church was founded to serve the immigrant mining community.

The church is located on Route 66.

== History ==
Coal miner Andrew Sosenko founded the church in 1907 after moving to Benld to work in the coal fields in Macoupin County. He contacted Father Michael Potochny of Streator, Illinois as well as priests in Pennsylvania for support opening the church.

St. Mary's original 40 parishioners raised $950 to build their first church. The church was blessed by Czar Nicholas II and the Patriarch of Moscow, who gave the parish holy relics of the saints and icons from Russia.

One July 27, 1915, the feast day of St. Vladimir, the church and all its contents were destroyed by fire. The parish rebuilt the church using brick. Local Rusyn priest, Father Nikita Gress, assisted in recreating the icons.

The church provided services to Slavic immigrants in the area. Many of these immigrants were coal miners.

Other southern Illinois villages with Orthodox churches included the towns of Royalton, IL, Buckner, Dowell, and Grand Tower.

A nearby cemetery was affiliated with the church. Many of the early Slavic immigrants who attended the church are buried there.
