= Stuart J. Traynor =

American lawyer and politician

Stuart J. Traynor Sr. (September 4, 1919 – December 10, 2008) was an American lawyer and politician.

Traynor was born in Gillespie, Illinois and went to the Gillespie public schools. He served in the United States Navy during World War II. He graduated from Saint Louis University School of Law in 1950. Traynor was admitted to the Illinois and Missouri bars. He lived in Taylorville, Illinois with his wife and family and practiced law in Taylorville. Traynor served in the Illinois House of Representatives from 1961 to 1964 and in the Illinois Senate from 1965 to 1967. He was a Democrat. Traynor died at his home in Taylorville, Illinois.
