= Eagarville, Illinois =

- Village
- Location in Macoupin County, Illinois
- Coordinates: 39°06′44″N 89°46′59″W
- Country: United States
- State: Illinois
- County: Macoupin
- Township: Cahokia

Area
  - Total: 0.93 sq mi (2.41 km^{2})
  - Land: 0.91 sq mi (2.36 km^{2})
  - Water: 0.019 sq mi (0.05 km^{2})
- Elevation: 643 ft (196 m)

Population (2020)
  - Total: 114
  - Density: 125.1/sq mi (48.31/km^{2})
- Time zone: UTC-6 (CST)
  - Summer (DST): UTC-5 (CDT)
- ZIP codes: 62023 (Eagarville); 62033 (Gillespie); 62069 (Mount Olive)
- Area code: 217
- FIPS code: 17-21410
- GNIS ID: 2398766

Eagarville is a village in Macoupin County, Illinois, United States. The population was 114 at the 2020 census.

== Geography ==
Eagarville is located in southeastern Macoupin County 3 miles (5 km) southeast of Gillespie, 2 miles (3 km) northeast of Benld, and 5 miles (8 km) northwest of Mount Olive.

According to the 2021 census gazetteer files, Eagarville has a total area of 0.93 square miles (2.41 km^{2}), of which 0.91 square miles (2.36 km^{2}) (or 97.96%) is land and 0.02 square miles (0.05 km^{2}) (or 2.04%) is water. Bear Creek crosses the southwest corner of the village, and Spring Creek crosses the northeast corner. Both are southeast-flowing tributaries of Cahokia Creek, a southwest-flowing direct tributary of the Mississippi River.

== Demographics ==
Historical population
Census	Pop.	Note	%±
1920	378		—
1930	483		27.8%
1940	251		−48.0%
1950	187		−25.5%
1960	149		−20.3%
1970	116		−22.1%
1980	148		27.6%
1990	127		−14.2%
2000	128		0.8%
2010	127		−0.8%
2020	114		−10.2%
U.S. Decennial Census

As of the 2020 census there were 114 people, 55 households, and 45 families residing in the village. The population density was 122.58 inhabitants per square mile (47.33/km^{2}). There were 45 housing units at an average density of 48.39 per square mile (18.68/km^{2}). The racial makeup of the village was 92.11% White, 0.00% African American, 0.00% Native American, 0.00% Asian, 0.00% Pacific Islander, 0.00% from other races, and 7.89% from two or more races. Hispanic or Latino of any race were 0.88% of the population.

There were 55 households, out of which 58.2% had children under the age of 18 living with them, 38.18% were married couples living together, 29.09% had a female householder with no husband present, and 18.18% were non-families. 14.55% of all households were made up of individuals, and 5.45% had someone living alone who was 65 years of age or older. The average household size was 3.42 and the average family size was 3.09.

The village's age distribution consisted of 35.9% under the age of 18, 8.2% from 18 to 24, 20.6% from 25 to 44, 23.5% from 45 to 64, and 11.8% who were 65 years of age or older. The median age was 30.0 years. For every 100 females, there were 97.7 males. For every 100 females age 18 and over, there were 78.7 males.

The median income for a household in the village was $50,938, and the median income for a family was $48,750. Males had a median income of $43,438 versus $22,750 for females. The per capita income for the village was $19,969. About 4.4% of families and 7.6% of the population were below the poverty line, including 9.8% of those under age 18 and 10.0% of those age 65 or over.
