= White City, Illinois =

- Village
- Location in Macoupin County, Illinois
- Coordinates: 39°04′18″N 89°45′49″W
- Country: United States
- State: Illinois
- County: Macoupin
- Township: Mount Olive

Area
  - Total: 1.22 sq mi (3.15 km^{2})
  - Land: 1.21 sq mi (3.14 km^{2})
  - Water: 0.0039 sq mi (0.01 km^{2})
- Elevation: 646 ft (197 m)

Population (2020)
  - Total: 212
  - Density: 174.9/sq mi (67.52/km^{2})
- Time zone: UTC-6 (CST)
  - Summer (DST): UTC-5 (CDT)
- ZIP code: 62069 (Mount Olive)
- Area code: 217
- FIPS code: 17-81191
- GNIS feature ID: 2400162
- Website: thevillageofwhitecity.com

White City is a village in Macoupin County, Illinois, United States. The population was 212 as of the 2020 census.

== Geography ==
White City is located in southeastern Macoupin County. Interstate 55 runs along the eastern border of the village, with access from Exit 44 (Illinois Route 138). The Interstate runs north 51 miles (82 km) to Springfield, the state capital, and southwest 45 miles (72 km) to St. Louis. IL 138 leads east 1.5 miles (2.4 km) to the center of Mount Olive (the mailing address for White City with ZIP Code 62069) and northwest 3.5 miles (5.6 km) to Benld.

According to the 2021 census gazetteer files, White City has a total area of 1.22 square miles (3.16 km^{2}), of which 1.21 square miles (3.13 km^{2}) (or 99.67%) is land and 0.00 square miles (0.00 km^{2}) (or 0.33%) is water. The village drains west to the valley of Cahokia Creek and southeast to East Creek, its tributary. Cahokia Creek is a west-flowing direct tributary of the Mississippi River.

== Demographics ==
Historical population
Census	Pop.	Note	%±
1910	421		—
1920	503		19.5%
1930	409		−18.7%
1940	330		−19.3%
1950	275		−16.7%
1960	197		−28.4%
1970	196		−0.5%
1980	214		9.2%
1990	229		7.0%
2000	221		−3.5%
2010	232		5.0%
2020	212		−8.6%
U.S. Decennial Census

As of the 2020 census there were 212 people, 87 households, and 66 families residing in the village. The population density was 174.34 inhabitants per square mile (67.31/km^{2}). There were 102 housing units at an average density of 83.88 per square mile (32.39/km^{2}). The racial makeup of the village was 96.23% White, 0.00% African American, 0.00% Native American, 1.89% Asian, 0.00% Pacific Islander, 0.00% from other races, and 1.89% from two or more races. Hispanic or Latino of any race were 0.00% of the population.

There were 87 households, out of which 19.5% had children under the age of 18 living with them, 59.77% were married couples living together, 10.34% had a female householder with no husband present, and 24.14% were non-families. 20.69% of all households were made up of individuals, and 11.49% had someone living alone who was 65 years of age or older. The average household size was 2.56 and the average family size was 2.26.

The village's age distribution consisted of 12.7% under the age of 18, 7.6% from 18 to 24, 29.5% from 25 to 44, 32.6% from 45 to 64, and 17.8% who were 65 years of age or older. The median age was 45.3 years. For every 100 females, there were 116.5 males. For every 100 females age 18 and over, there were 117.7 males.

The median income for a household in the village was $54,063, and the median income for a family was $73,750. Males had a median income of $53,750 versus $22,083 for females. The per capita income for the village was $29,857. About 10.6% of families and 10.2% of the population were below the poverty line, including 8.0% of those under age 18 and 2.9% of those age 65 or over.
