= Royalton, Illinois =

- Village
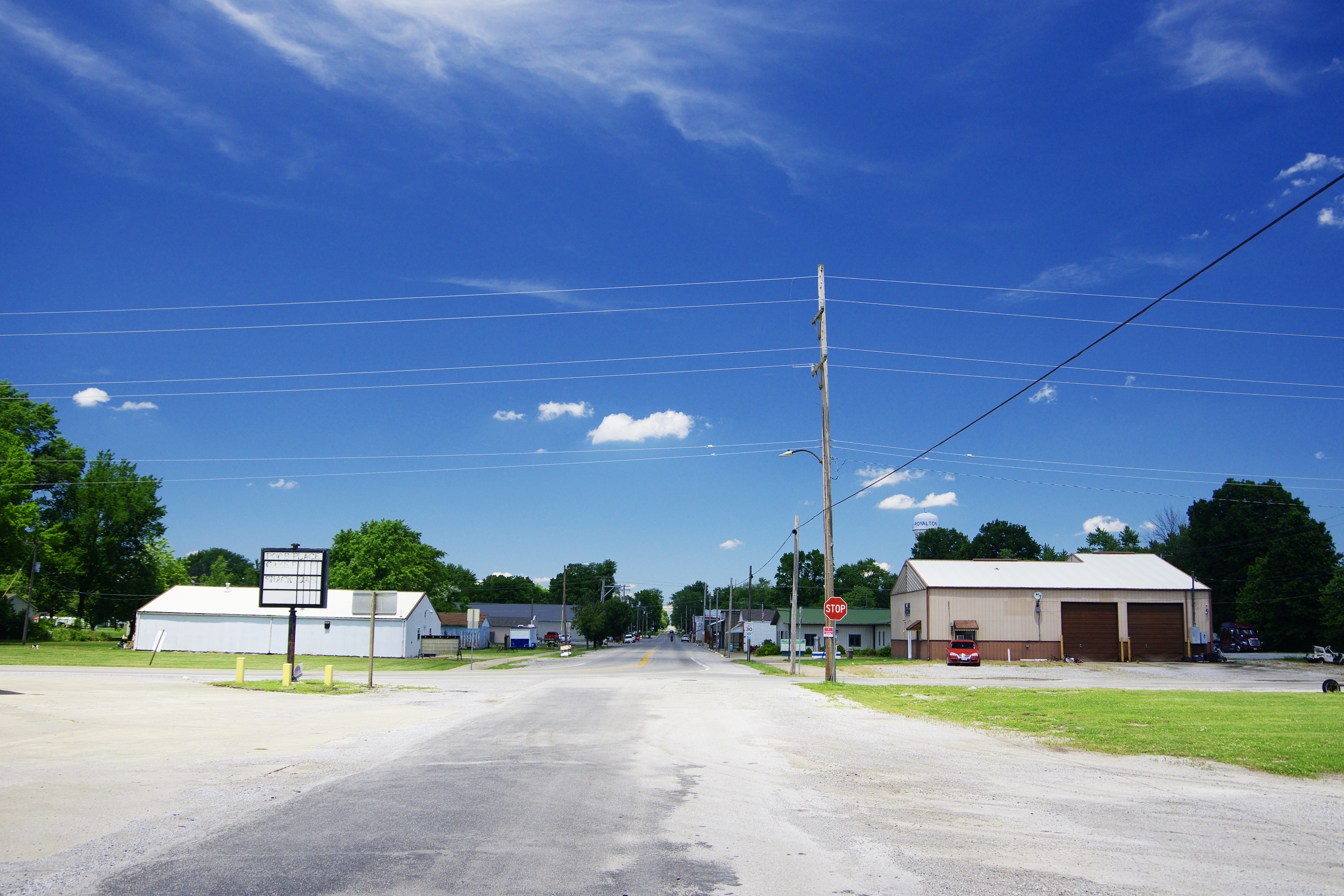
- Main Street

- Location of Royalton in Franklin County, Illinois.
- Coordinates: 37°52′29″N 89°06′51″W
- Country: United States
- State: Illinois
- County: Franklin
- Township: Six Mile

Area
  - Total: 1.12 sq mi (2.91 km^{2})
  - Land: 1.12 sq mi (2.89 km^{2})
  - Water: 0.0077 sq mi (0.02 km^{2})
- Elevation: 390 ft (120 m)

Population (2020)
  - Total: 1,068
  - Density: 957.8/sq mi (369.81/km^{2})
- Time zone: UTC-6 (CST)
  - Summer (DST): UTC-5 (CDT)
- ZIP code: 62983
- Area code: 618
- FIPS code: 17-66209
- GNIS feature ID: 2399139
- Website: www.royaltonillinois.com

Royalton is a village in Franklin County, Illinois, United States. The population was 1,068 at the 2020 census.

== History ==
According to the original surveys of Illinois, in the early 19th century the Lusk's Ferry Road ran through the middle of what is now Royalton, heading on a diagonal line toward the southeast. The Lusk's Ferry Road was an important early road connecting Fort Kaskaskia with Lusk's Ferry on the Ohio River. No trace of this road remains near Royalton. It is not clear whether the road figured in the early history of the town, or if it was long forgotten before Royalton came into existence.

Mr. Isaac Snider lived in nearby Six Mile Township in the 1850s on the Mount Vernon-Murphysboro Mail Road. Mr. Snider built a store in the spring of 1856 and opened a post office named Osage because Osage trees grew there. On November 20, 1857, Mr. Snider plotted a village of 38 lots. The hamlet soon had two stores, a post office, drug store, blacksmith shop, a doctor and a telephone exchange.

In 1904 Mr. Henry Pierce laid out a village just north of the mine and named it Pierce. He set up a store and moved Osage Post Office the store and the name of the village changed to Pierce. However Mr. Pierce died soon after this and he had not recorded his survey. His widow Elizabeth recorded the survey on November 3, 1905. Mr. John W. Royal owned the farm north of the Pierce farm. He had a village surveyed on his farm by September 30, 1905, and recorded that same day. As a result, the town was given the name Royalton.

The village was inhabited by European immigrants related to the mining industry of the area.

The opening of mines in Royalton led to a population explosion, reaching a peak of 3,800 people.

=== Coal mining ===
The Big Muddy and Carterville Coal Company opened the North #1 mine in 1907. It was operated by J. L. Mitchell. Mitchell brought in box cars and used them as homes for the miners. These were located along North Main Street.

Franklin Coal & Coke Company took over this mine in 1910, and along with its mine south of Royalton, operated two mines in Royalton. At its peak, the #1 mine (sometimes also referred to as the #7 mine) employed over 600 miners. In 1949 Lyda B mine was opened, however it closed in 1952.

On October 27, 1914, an explosion in the North #1 Mine of the Franklin Coal & Coke Company killed 52 miners. This was the worst mine disaster to date in the coal fields of southern Illinois. Many of the miners killed in the explosion were European immigrants. Another explosion occurred at the mine on September 28, 1918, killing 21 men.

The South Mine closed in 1920. The North #1 mine operated until September, 1951.

=== Protection of the Holy Virgin Mary Orthodox Church ===
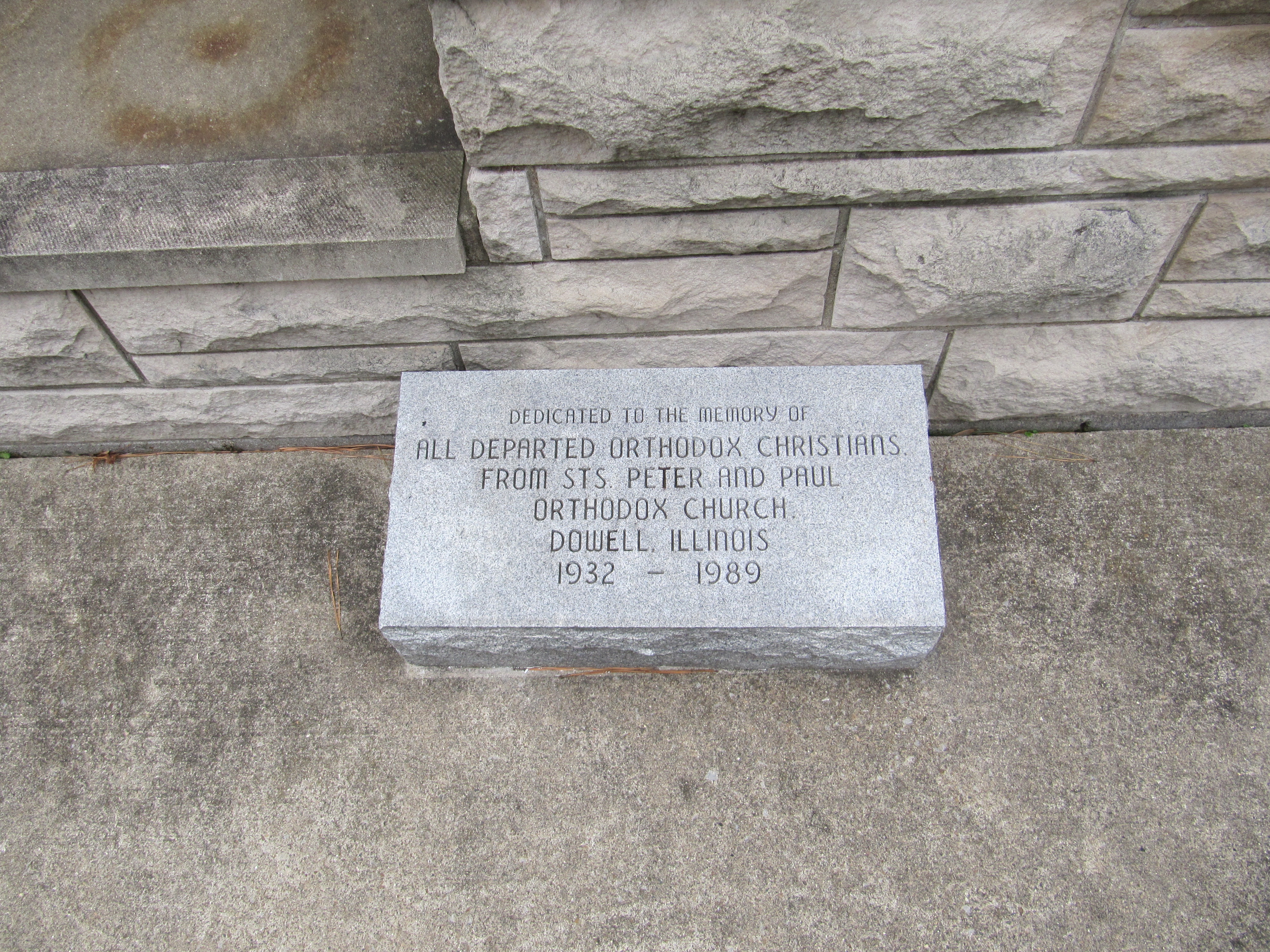
Memorial to the former Dowell Russian Orthodox Church, located at the Holy Protection Russian Orthodox church in Royalton

The Protection of the Holy Virgin Mary Orthodox Church in Royalton is the only remaining Russian Orthodox church in southern Illinois. The church was founded by eastern European immigrants, including Rusyns, many of whom worked in local coal mines. The three principal founders were Frank Derbak, John August and Paul Andrews. The church opened to parishioners in late 1914. It was built to mimic the construction of St. Ioasaph's in Muddy.

Many of the miners who were killed in the 1914 mine disaster were members of the church. There is a memorial at the church, and many of the miners were buried in a cemetery dedicated to the disaster.

At one time, there was a Russian Orthodox church in nearby Dowell, but it has closed. A memorial to the Dowell church is located in Royalton.,

== Geography ==
Royalton is located in southwestern Franklin County. Illinois Route 149 passes through the center of town, leading north and east 4.5 miles (7.2 km) to Zeigler and west and south 4.5 miles (7.2 km) to Hurst.

According to the 2021 census gazetteer files, Royalton has a total area of 1.12 square miles (2.90 km^{2}), of which 1.12 square miles (2.90 km^{2}) (or 99.29%) is land and 0.01 square miles (0.03 km^{2}) (or 0.71%) is water.

== Demographics ==
Historical population
Census	Pop.	Note	%±
1910	357		—
1920	2,043		472.3%
1930	2,108		3.2%
1940	1,772		−15.9%
1950	1,506		−15.0%
1960	1,225		−18.7%
1970	1,166		−4.8%
1980	1,320		13.2%
1990	1,191		−9.8%
2000	1,130		−5.1%
2010	1,151		1.9%
2020	1,068		−7.2%
U.S. Decennial Census

=== 2020 census ===
As of the 2020 census, Royalton had a population of 1,068. The median age was 46.3 years. 19.8% of residents were under the age of 18 and 23.2% were 65 years of age or older. For every 100 females there were 100.0 males, and for every 100 females age 18 and over there were 93.9 males age 18 and over.

0.0% of residents lived in urban areas, while 100.0% lived in rural areas.

There were 311 families residing in the village. The population density was 951.02 inhabitants per square mile (367.19/km^{2}), and there were 542 housing units at an average density of 482.64 per square mile (186.35/km^{2}).

There were 473 households in Royalton, of which 26.6% had children under the age of 18 living in them. Of all households, 40.4% were married-couple households, 18.8% were households with a male householder and no spouse or partner present, and 30.0% were households with a female householder and no spouse or partner present. About 30.0% of all households were made up of individuals and 15.8% had someone living alone who was 65 years of age or older.

Of all housing units, 12.7% were vacant. The homeowner vacancy rate was 4.0% and the rental vacancy rate was 3.3%.

Racial composition as of the 2020 census
Race	Number	Percent
White	993	93.0%
Black or African American	6	0.6%
American Indian and Alaska Native	0	0.0%
Asian	0	0.0%
Native Hawaiian and Other Pacific Islander	0	0.0%
Some other race	6	0.6%
Two or more races	63	5.9%
Hispanic or Latino (of any race)	20	1.9%

=== Socioeconomics ===
The median income for a household in the village was $33,750, and the median income for a family was $56,607. Males had a median income of $43,333 versus $20,859 for females. The per capita income for the village was $29,733. About 10.6% of families and 17.6% of the population were below the poverty line, including 25.7% of those under age 18 and 15.4% of those age 65 or over.
