= Grand Tower Pipeline Bridge =

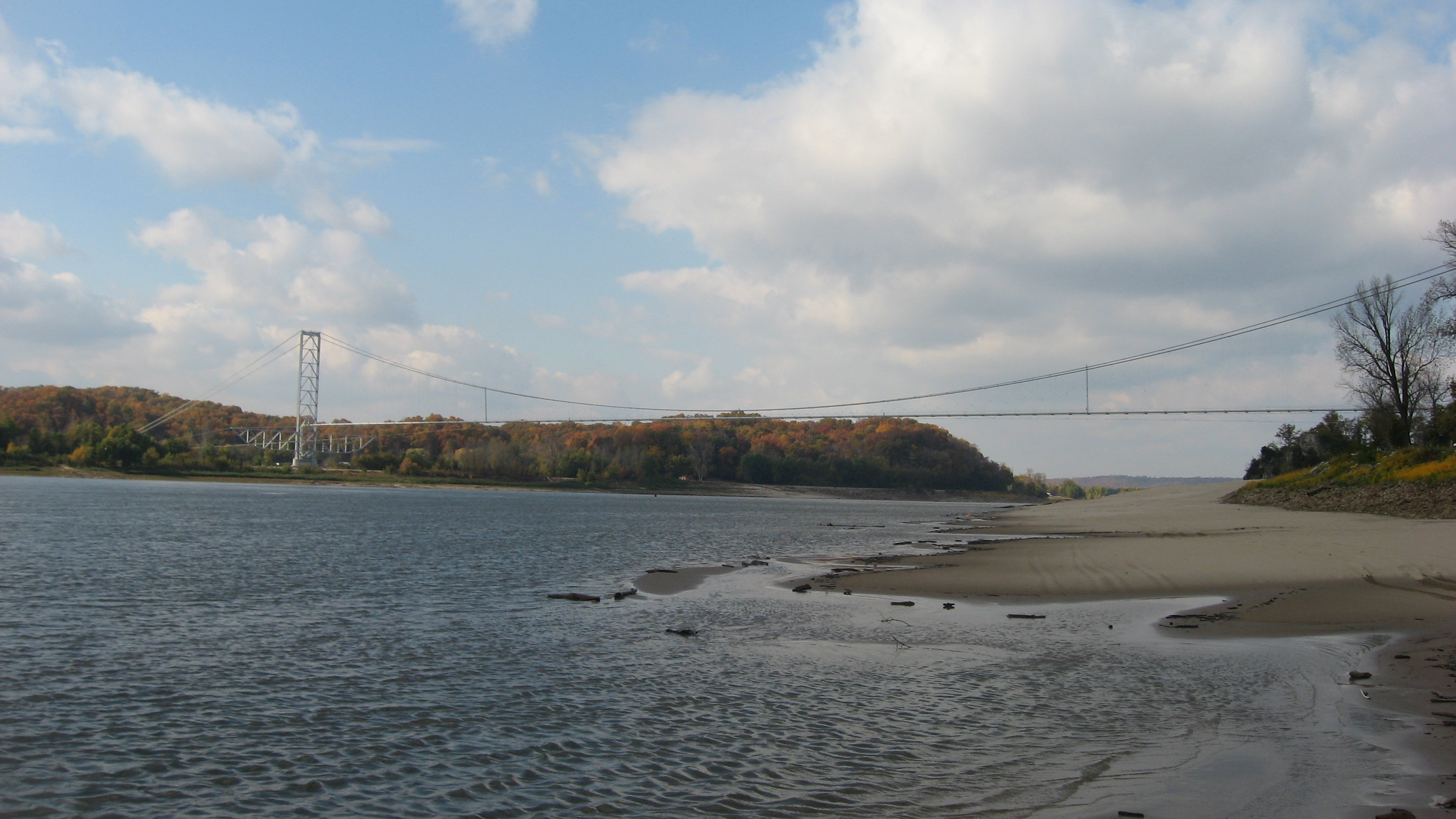
- View of the bridge from the south
- Coordinates: 37°38′31″N 89°31′03″W
- Carries: Natural gas
- Crosses: Mississippi River
- Locale: Grand Tower, Illinois
- Maintained by: Natural Gas Pipeline Company of America

Characteristics
- Design: Suspension bridge
- Longest span: 2,161.5 feet (659 m)

History
- Opened: 1955

The Grand Tower Pipeline Bridge is a suspension bridge carrying a natural gas pipeline across the Mississippi River between Wittenberg, Missouri and Grand Tower, Illinois.

== Construction ==
Although construction of a natural gas pipeline under the Mississippi River would have been cheaper, this option would have created great difficulty in handling any leaks and maintenance, so it was decided to construct a bridge to carry the gas pipeline. The bridge was the first pipeline suspension bridge to cross the Mississippi River. It was constructed for the Texas–Illinois Natural Gas Pipeline company for an estimated $3,800,000 in 1953 (equivalent to $34.6 million in 2023). It was the final piece in the construction of a natural gas pipeline transporting gas from Corpus Christi, Texas to Chicago, Illinois, and Detroit, Michigan, which carries 500 million cubic feet (14×10^{6} m^{3}) of gas a day at a pressure of 850 pounds per square inch (5,900 kPa). Work began in September, 1953. The bridge features two 266-foot-tall (81 m) steel framework towers, one on each side of the river. Vertical steel suspender cables connect the twin 30-inch (76 cm) pipelines to the main suspension cables, at a height of 115 feet (35 m) above the river. During construction the 80-foot-long (24 m) pipes were stretched out across the river where welders connected them together. Each pipe weighs 5 tons and it took 72 pipes to span the river, adding to around 360 tons of dead weight. The abutments to support this weight go to the bedrock, 50 feet (15 m) deep on the Illinois side and 154 feet (47 m) on the Missouri side. The site at Grand Tower/Wittenberg was chosen because the river is narrow and deep there, and the limestone bedrock could be easily reached.

== See also ==
- List of crossings of the Upper Mississippi River
