= Gillespie, Illinois =

- City
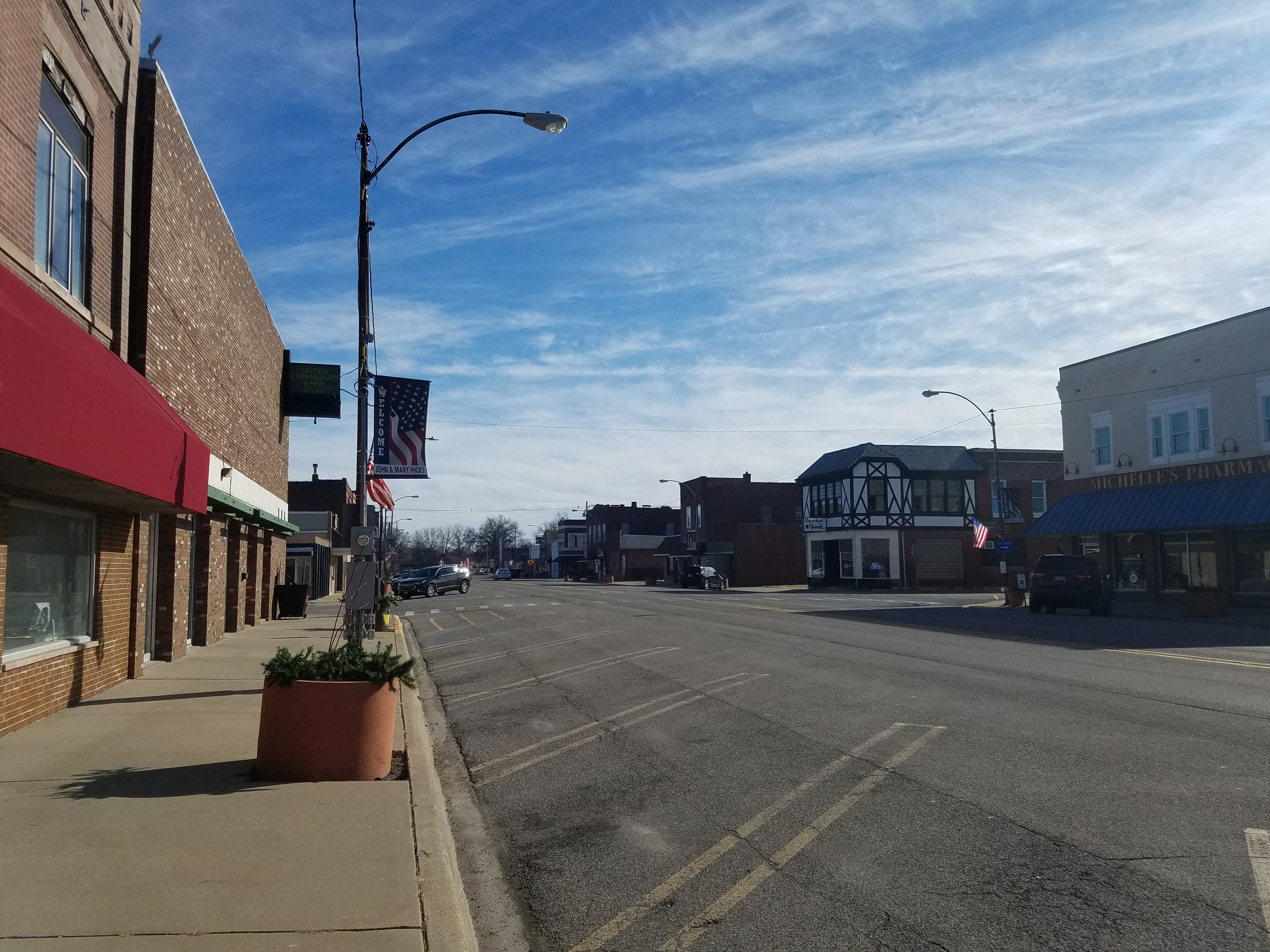
- Downtown Gillespie

- Location in Macoupin County, Illinois
- Coordinates: 39°07′24″N 89°48′58″W
- Country: United States
- State: Illinois
- County: Macoupin
- Townships: Gillespie, Cahokia
- Incorporated: 1853

Area
  - Total: 1.48 sq mi (3.8 km^{2})
  - Land: 1.48 sq mi (3.8 km^{2})
  - Water: 0.00 sq mi (0 km^{2})
- Elevation: 663 ft (202 m)

Population (2020)
  - Total: 3,168
  - Density: 2,140.5/sq mi (826.5/km^{2})
- Time zone: UTC-6 (CST)
  - Summer (DST): UTC-5 (CDT)
- ZIP code: 62033
- Area code(s): 217, 447
- FIPS code: 17-29236
- GNIS feature ID: 2394896
- Website: cityofgillespie.org

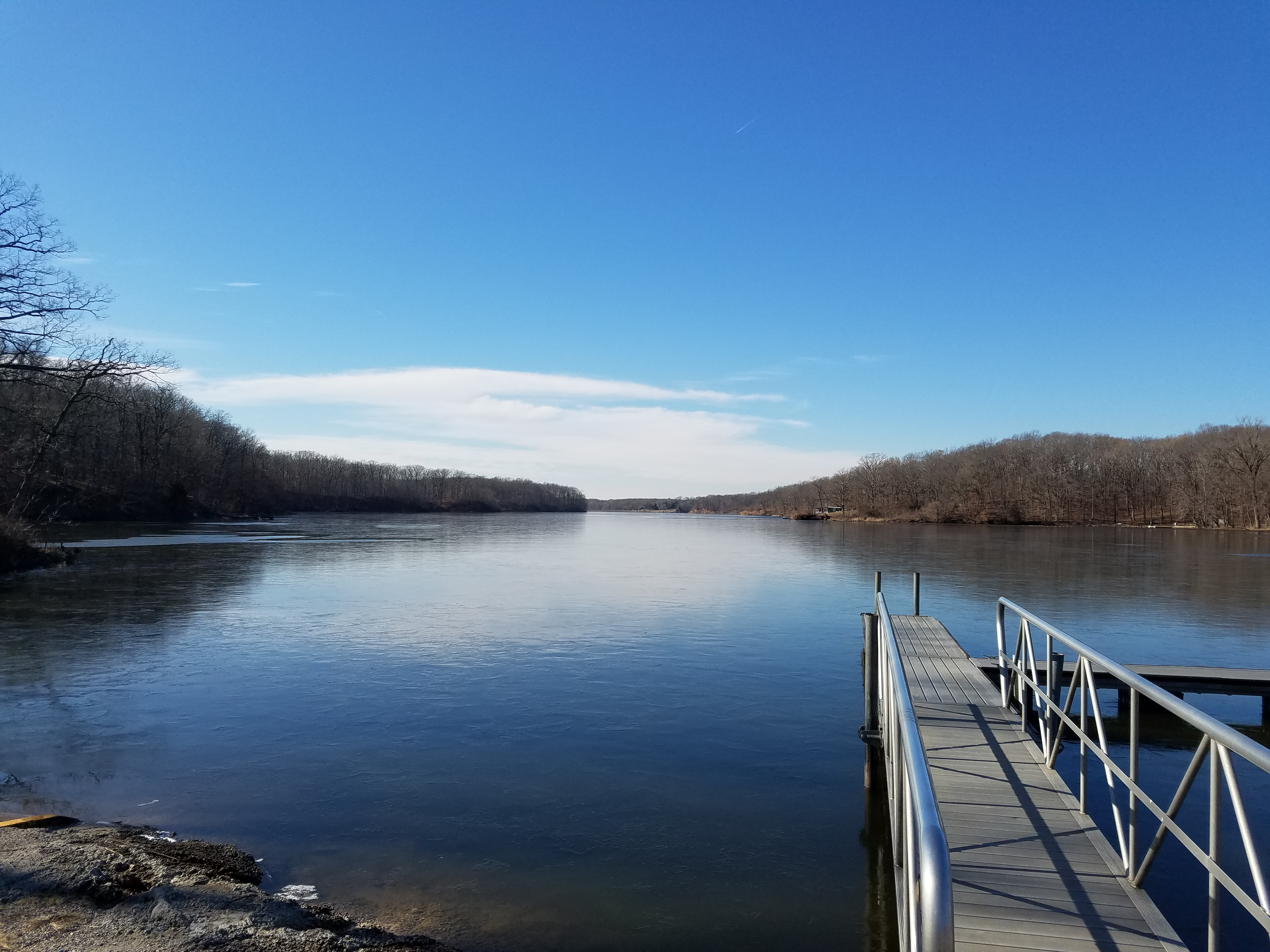
New Lake, west of Gillespie

Gillespie is a city in Macoupin County, Illinois, United States, and part of the Metro East region of the St. Louis metropolitan area. The population was 3,168 at the 2020 census.

== History ==
The first group of settlers arrived to the area of Gillespie in the late 1820s from Kentucky, Ohio, and Indiana. The township thrived in the 1830s, increasing in population and businesses. In 1835 the first schoolhouse was built. Gillespie was incorporated as a town in the spring of 1853. By 1904, the population rose to 3,100 and there were a number of businesses, churches, and schools. On January 29, 1905, a fire swept through the business district and destroyed most businesses and some homes.

For years, Gillespie's main source of employment were the multiple coal mines scattered throughout the township operated by the Chicago & Northwestern Railway. It is said that Gillespie boasted three of the largest coal mines in the world.

Gillespie is named for Judge Joseph Gillespie, who was active in Illinois state politics.

On May 31, 2013, a low-end EF2 tornado tore through Gillespie, causing major damage to a brick gymnasium at Gillespie High School. It was on the ground for three minutes and resulted in zero injuries or fatalities.

== Geography ==
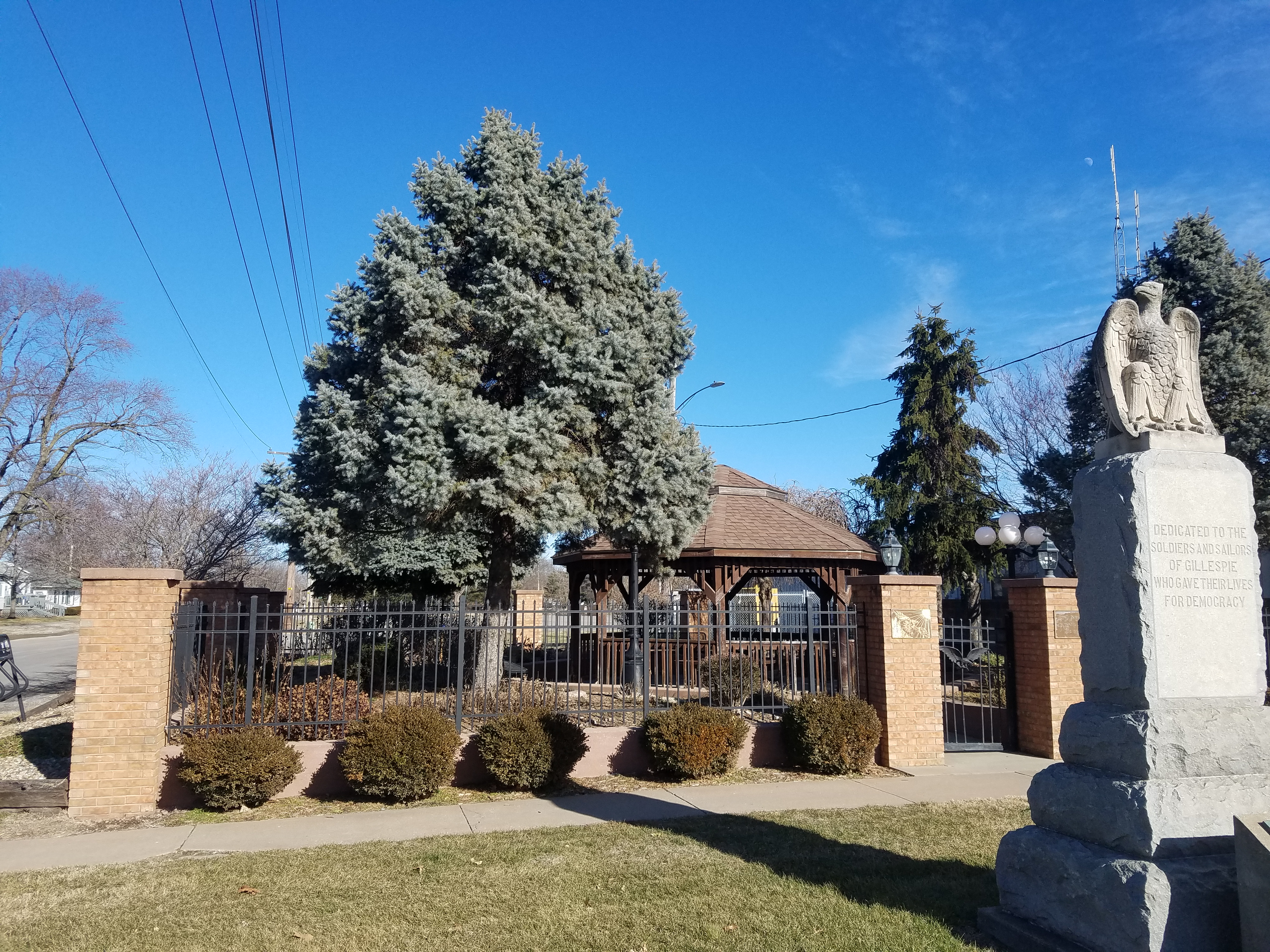
Gillespie's city hall pavilion

Gillespie is located mainly in eastern Gillespie Township but extends east into the west part of Cahokia Township. It is bordered to the north by the village of East Gillespie.

Illinois Routes 4 and 16 pass through Gillespie, joining in the center of town as East Elm Street. Route 4 leads north 13 miles (21 km) to Carlinville, the county seat, and south 8 miles (13 km) to Staunton. St. Louis is 47 miles (76 km) to the southwest. Route 16 leads northeast 10 miles (16 km) to Litchfield and west 28 miles (45 km) to Jerseyville.

According to the U.S. Census Bureau, Gillespie has a total area of 1.48 square miles (3.83 km^{2}), all land. The city is drained to the southeast by Bear Creek, a tributary of Cahokia Creek, which runs to the Mississippi River northeast of St. Louis. To the northwest are Old and New Gillespie Lakes, reservoirs on the Dry Fork of Macoupin Creek, a west-flowing tributary of the Illinois River. The two lakes are 3 to 5 miles (4.8 to 8.0 km) northwest of the city, and many people from surrounding towns enjoy fishing, boating, water-skiing and sunbathing there.

== Demographics ==
Historical population
| Census | Pop. | Note | %± |
|---|---|---|---|
| 1880 | 432 | | — |
| 1890 | 948 | | 119.4% |
| 1900 | 873 | | −7.9% |
| 1910 | 2,241 | | 156.7% |
| 1920 | 4,063 | | 81.3% |
| 1930 | 5,111 | | 25.8% |
| 1940 | 4,440 | | −13.1% |
| 1950 | 4,105 | | −7.5% |
| 1960 | 3,569 | | −13.1% |
| 1970 | 3,457 | | −3.1% |
| 1980 | 3,740 | | 8.2% |
| 1990 | 3,645 | | −2.5% |
| 2000 | 3,412 | | −6.4% |
| 2010 | 3,319 | | −2.7% |
| 2020 | 3,168 | | −4.5% |
U.S. Decennial Census

=== 2020 census ===
As of the 2020 census, Gillespie had a population of 3,168. The median age was 41.3 years. 21.9% of residents were under the age of 18 and 19.7% of residents were 65 years of age or older. For every 100 females there were 97.5 males, and for every 100 females age 18 and over there were 92.3 males age 18 and over.

99.8% of residents lived in urban areas, while 0.2% lived in rural areas.

There were 1,341 households in Gillespie, of which 28.8% had children under the age of 18 living in them. Of all households, 44.9% were married-couple households, 17.2% were households with a male householder and no spouse or partner present, and 28.6% were households with a female householder and no spouse or partner present. About 29.5% of all households were made up of individuals and 15.0% had someone living alone who was 65 years of age or older.

There were 1,511 housing units, of which 11.3% were vacant. The homeowner vacancy rate was 2.5% and the rental vacancy rate was 9.4%.

Racial composition as of the 2020 census
| Race | Number | Percent |
|---|---|---|
| White | 2,991 | 94.4% |
| Black or African American | 7 | 0.2% |
| American Indian and Alaska Native | 11 | 0.3% |
| Asian | 11 | 0.3% |
| Native Hawaiian and Other Pacific Islander | 0 | 0.0% |
| Some other race | 8 | 0.3% |
| Two or more races | 140 | 4.4% |
| Hispanic or Latino (of any race) | 28 | 0.9% |

=== 2000 census ===
As of the census of 2000, there were 3,412 people, 1,452 households, and 936 families residing in the city. The population density was 2,349.3 inhabitants per square mile (907.1/km^{2}). There were 1,547 housing units at an average density of 1,065.1 per square mile (411.2/km^{2}). The racial makeup of the city was 98.56% White, 0.32% African American, 0.21% Native American, 0.12% Asian, 0.06% Pacific Islander, 0.15% from other races, and 0.59% from two or more races. Hispanic or Latino people of any race were 0.73% of the population.

There were 1,452 households, of which 28.9% had children under the age of 18 living with them, 50.8% were married couples living together, 9.9% had a female householder with no husband present, and 35.5% were non-families. 31.0% of all households were made up of individuals, and 16.4% had someone living alone who was 65 years of age or older. The average household size was 2.35 and the average family size was 2.93.

In the city, the population was spread out, with 23.3% under the age of 18, 9.3% from 18 to 24, 27.3% from 25 to 44, 22.7% from 45 to 64, and 17.4% who were 65 years of age or older. The median age was 39 years. For every 100 females, there were 88.3 males. For every 100 females age 18 and over, there were 86.1 males.

The median income for a household in the city was $33,168, and the median income for a family was $40,500. Males had a median income of $35,032 versus $23,136 for females. The per capita income for the city was $19,042. About 8.6% of families and 12.4% of the population were below the poverty line, including 17.4% of those under age 18 and 9.5% of those age 65 or over.

== Education ==
Gillespie is home to Gillespie C.U.S.D. #7, which operates Gillespie High School, Gillespie Middle School, and Ben-Gil Elementary School.

== Services ==
The city of Gillespie provides police protection for the neighboring communities of Benld, Mount Clare, and Eagarville. In addition Gillespie supplies water to Benld, Sawyerville, Wilsonville, Mount Clare, Dorchester, East Gillespie, and Eagarville, as well as sewer services to East Gillespie and Eagarville.

== Notable people ==
- Ferras Alqais, singer-songwriter
- W. Russell Arrington, Illinois state legislator and lawyer; born in Gillespie
- Vince Demuzio, Illinois state legislator; born in Gillespie
- Clarence J. Goodnight, zoologist; born in Gillespie
- Howard Keel, film and television actor and singer
- William D. Lyons, coal miner and Illinois state legislator; lived in Gillespie
- Harry Patton, pitcher for the St. Louis Cardinals; born in Gillespie
- Raphael Tracey, U.S. soccer player and member of the National Soccer Hall of Fame; born in Gillespie
- Stuart J. Traynor, lawyer and Illinois state legislator; born in Gillespie
