= Grand Tower, Illinois =

- City
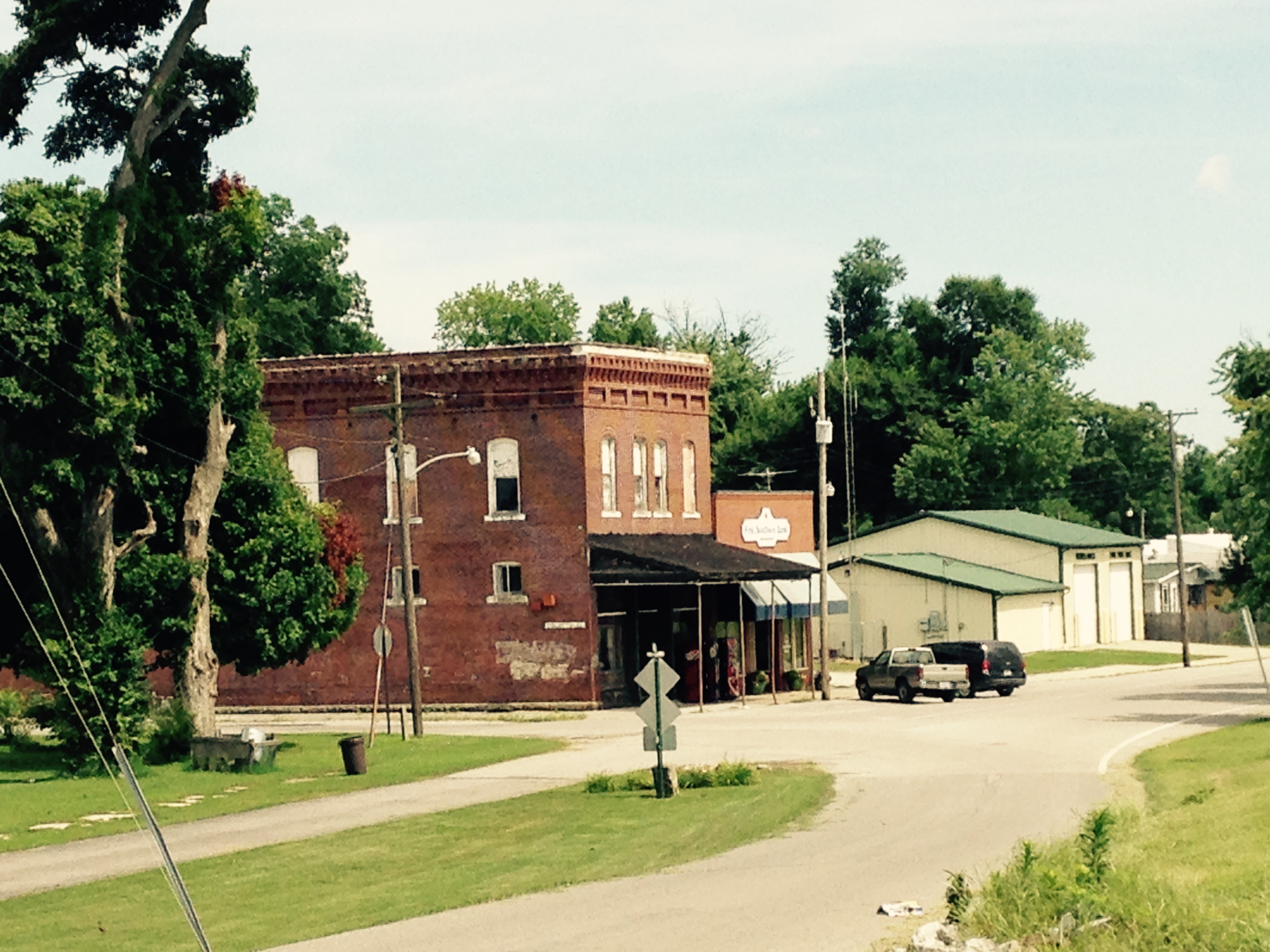
- Front Street

- Location of Grand Tower in Jackson County, Illinois
- Coordinates: 37°37′57″N 89°30′07″W
- Country: United States
- State: Illinois
- County: Jackson
- Township: Grand Tower

Area
  - Total: 1.25 sq mi (3.24 km^{2})
  - Land: 1.25 sq mi (3.23 km^{2})
  - Water: 0.0039 sq mi (0.01 km^{2})
- Elevation: 361 ft (110 m)

Population (2020)
  - Total: 479
  - Density: 383.7/sq mi (148.16/km^{2})
- Time zone: UTC-6 (CST)
  - Summer (DST): UTC-5 (CDT)
- ZIP code: 62942
- Area code: 618
- FIPS code: 17-30770
- GNIS feature ID: 2394955

Grand Tower is a city in Jackson County, Illinois, United States. The population was 479 at the 2020 census. The town gets its name from Tower Rock, a landmark island in the Mississippi River.

== History ==
Former names of this town include La Tour ("The Tower"), Jenkins Landing, Cochran's Woodyard Landing, and Evans' Landing.

The earliest inhabitants were a band of river pirates, who settled here after being driven off Spanish soil west of the Mississippi River, near the pirate ambush spot of Tower Rock. This outlaw settlement was destroyed by the United States Army dragoons in 1803. A subsequent settler was a man named Walker, who is the namesake of Walker Hill.

Severe flooding struck the town in 1947.

Grand Tower once hosted a Russian Orthodox Church. Other nearby southern Illinois villages with Orthodox churches included St. Mary's Russian Orthodox Church in Benld, Buckner, and Dowell.

== Geography ==
Grand Tower is located in southwestern Jackson County and is bordered to the west by the Mississippi River, which forms the Missouri–Illinois boundary. The northern edge of the city borders Shawnee National Forest.

Illinois Route 3 runs through an eastern extension of the city limits, leading north (upriver) 32 miles (51 km) to Chester, where the Chester Bridge crosses the Mississippi, and south 25 miles (40 km) to Illinois Route 146, which crosses the Mississippi to Cape Girardeau, Missouri. There are no other road bridges over the Mississippi closer to Grand Tower.

According to the 2021 census gazetteer files, Grand Tower has a total area of 1.25 square miles (3.24 km^{2}), of which 1.25 square miles (3.24 km^{2}) (or 99.76%) is land and 0.00 square miles (0.00 km^{2}) (or 0.24%) is water.

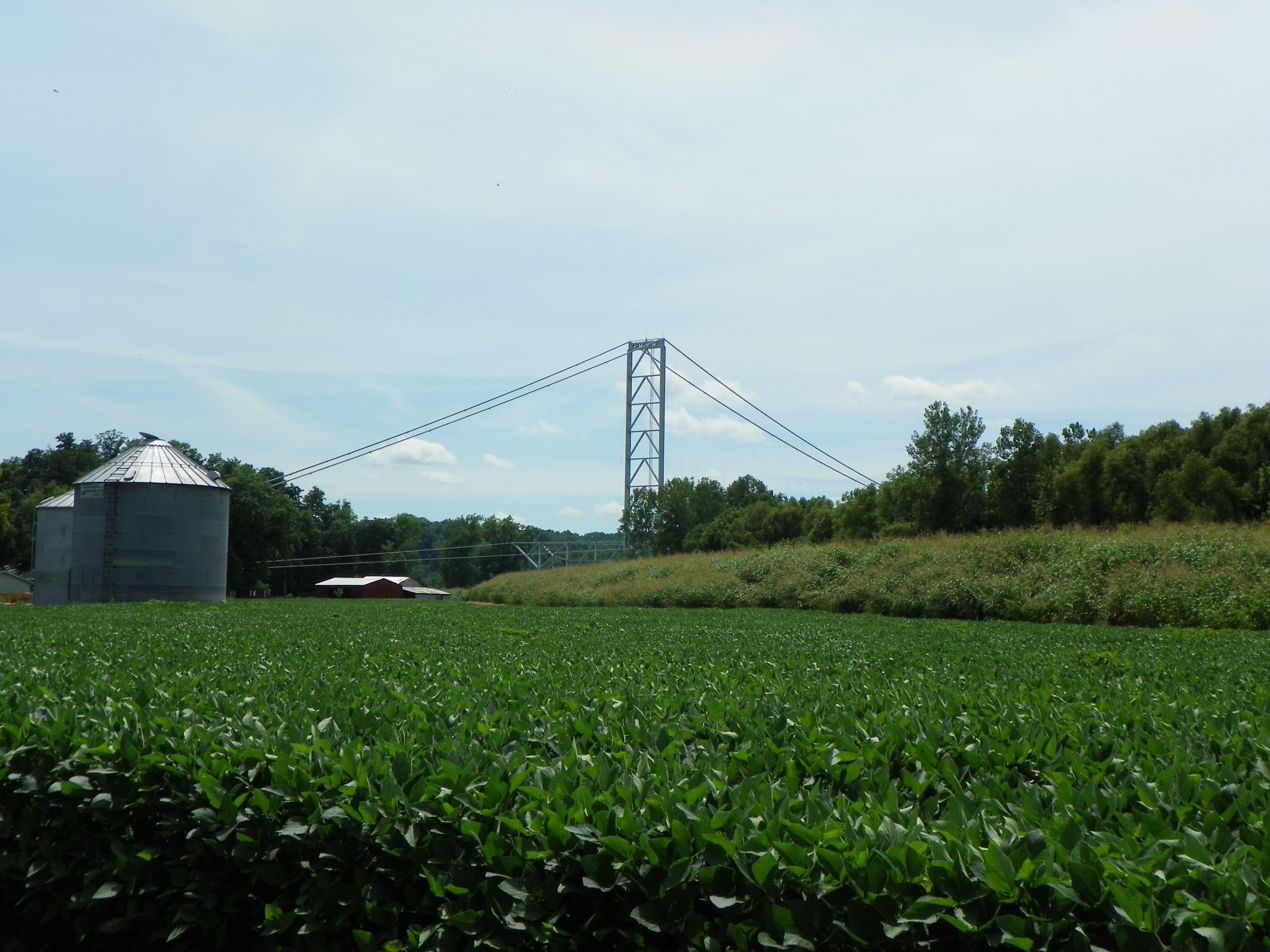
Grand Tower Natural Gas Pipeline Bridge

Immediately to the south of the city is a small portion of Perry County, Missouri, which is known as "Grand Tower Island". The island's sole road connection terminates in Grand Tower. The Grand Tower Pipeline Bridge connects a natural gas pipeline across the Mississippi River between Wittenberg, Missouri and Grand Tower.

== Economy ==
The Grand Tower Energy Center is a 478 megawatt combined cycle gas-fired facility which produces power for the region. It is owned by Ameren Energy Generating Company, or Genco.

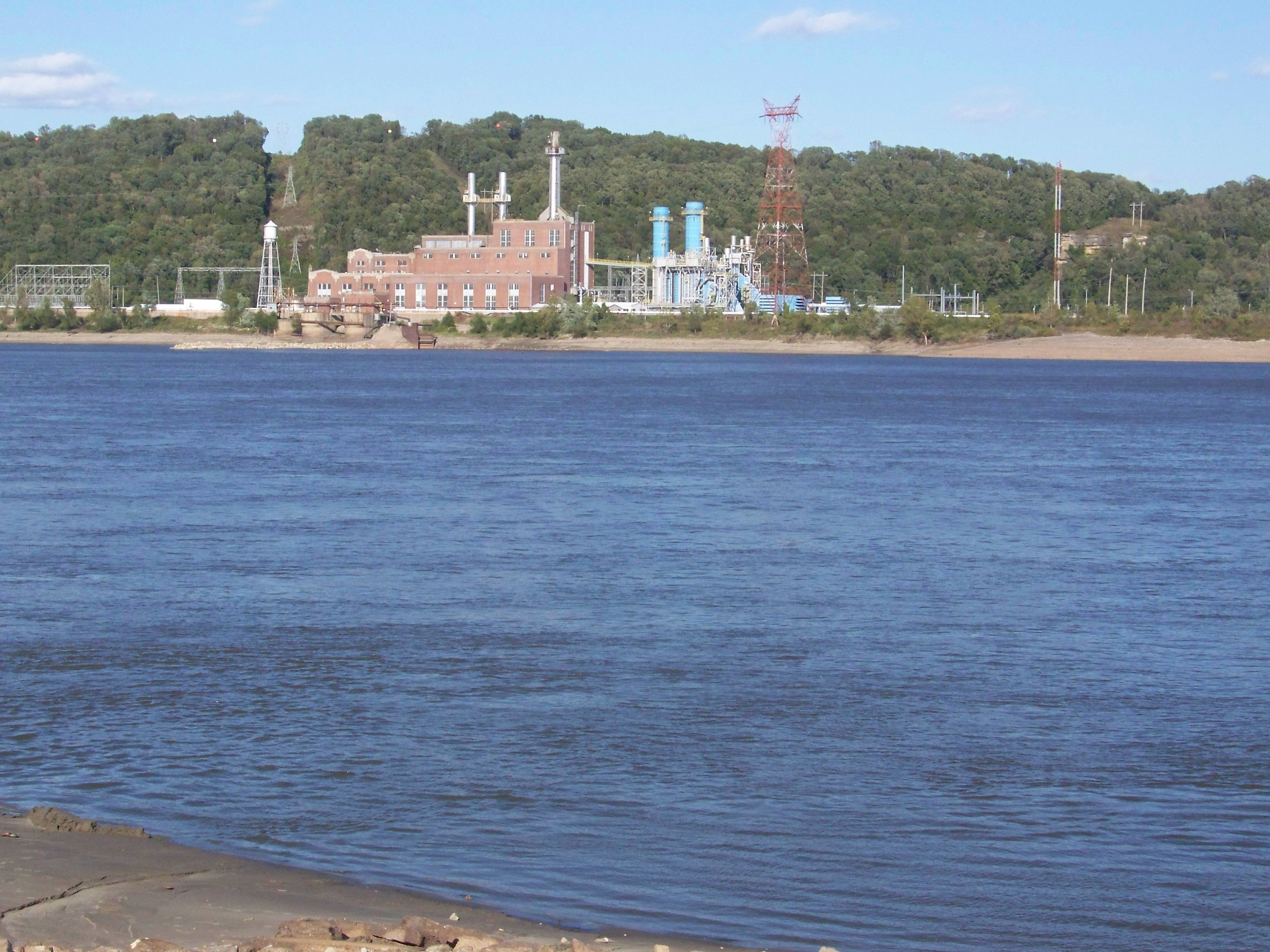
Grand Tower Energy Center

== Community ==
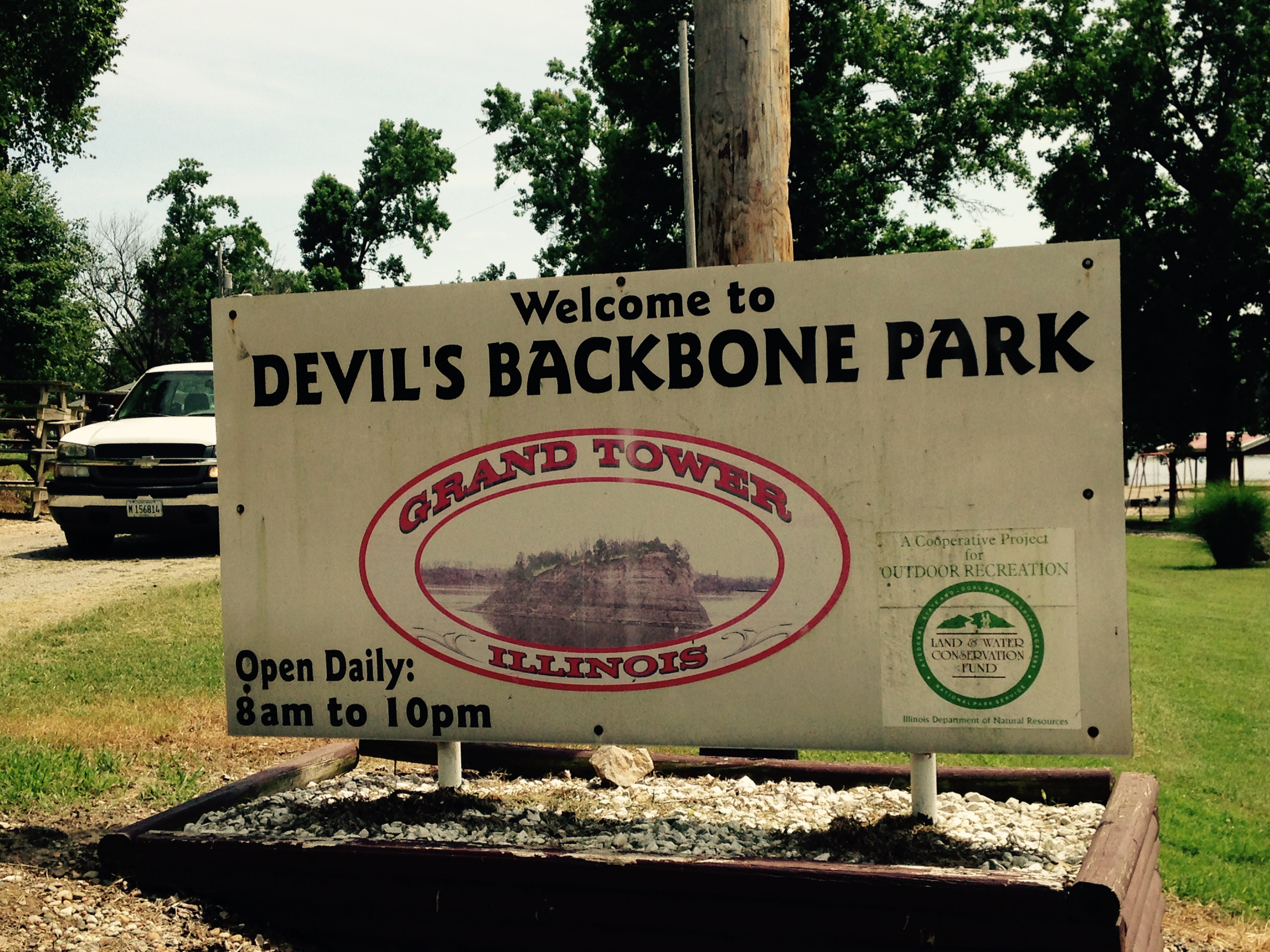
Devil's Backbone Park sign

Shawnee Elementary School, North - Once a public school, now (since 2015) a private residence.

A local post office with zip code 62942 provides mail service. Four churches, the First United Presbyterian Church, the Grand Tower United Methodist Church, First Baptist Church, and Light House Christian Assembly Church offer religious services. A work of levees protects the community from flooding when the Mississippi River water levels rise. The Devil's Backbone Park, named after a limestone ridge which created a natural bottleneck in the Mississippi River, provided easy opportunity for river pirates to attack shipping. This park provides RV camping, playgrounds, picnic facilities, and a shower house.

== Demographics ==
Historical population
| Census | Pop. | Note | %± |
|---|---|---|---|
| 1880 | 966 | | — |
| 1890 | 624 | | −35.4% |
| 1900 | 881 | | 41.2% |
| 1910 | 873 | | −0.9% |
| 1920 | 750 | | −14.1% |
| 1930 | 953 | | 27.1% |
| 1940 | 1,043 | | 9.4% |
| 1950 | 963 | | −7.7% |
| 1960 | 847 | | −12.0% |
| 1970 | 664 | | −21.6% |
| 1980 | 748 | | 12.7% |
| 1990 | 775 | | 3.6% |
| 2000 | 624 | | −19.5% |
| 2010 | 605 | | −3.0% |
| 2020 | 479 | | −20.8% |
U.S. Decennial Census

As of the 2020 census there were 479 people, 220 households, and 135 families residing in the city. The population density was 382.89 inhabitants per square mile (147.83/km^{2}). There were 263 housing units at an average density of 210.23 per square mile (81.17/km^{2}). The racial makeup of the city was 94.57% White, 0.21% African American, 0.00% Native American, 0.00% Asian, 0.00% Pacific Islander, 0.63% from other races, and 4.59% from two or more races. Hispanic or Latino of any race were 1.46% of the population.

There were 220 households, out of which 27.3% had children under the age of 18 living with them, 42.27% were married couples living together, 10.00% had a female householder with no husband present, and 38.64% were non-families. 21.82% of all households were made up of individuals, and 9.09% had someone living alone who was 65 years of age or older. The average household size was 3.21 and the average family size was 2.68.

The city's age distribution consisted of 22.9% under the age of 18, 13.9% from 18 to 24, 25.7% from 25 to 44, 24.8% from 45 to 64, and 12.7% who were 65 years of age or older. The median age was 36.3 years. For every 100 females, there were 115.8 males. For every 100 females age 18 and over, there were 112.1 males.

The median income for a household in the city was $48,500, and the median income for a family was $56,250. Males had a median income of $40,781 versus $21,136 for females. The per capita income for the city was $20,423. About 5.2% of families and 13.0% of the population were below the poverty line, including 17.4% of those under age 18 and 21.3% of those age 65 or over.

== Notable people ==
- Christine Brewer, opera singer
- Ike Morgan, illustrator

== Popular culture ==
- The novel The River Between Us, written by Richard Peck, was set in Grand Tower.

== Gallery ==
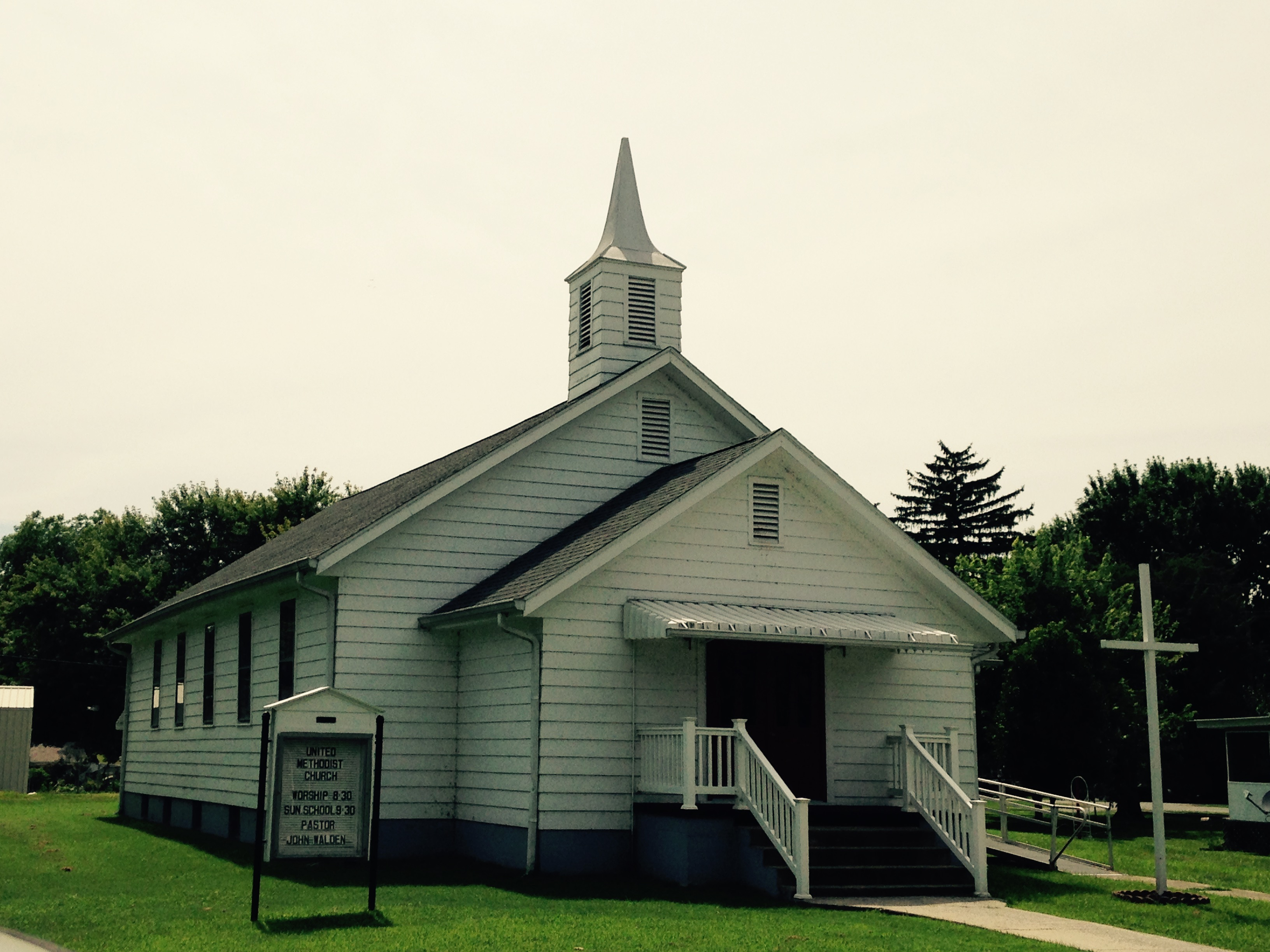
United Methodist Church

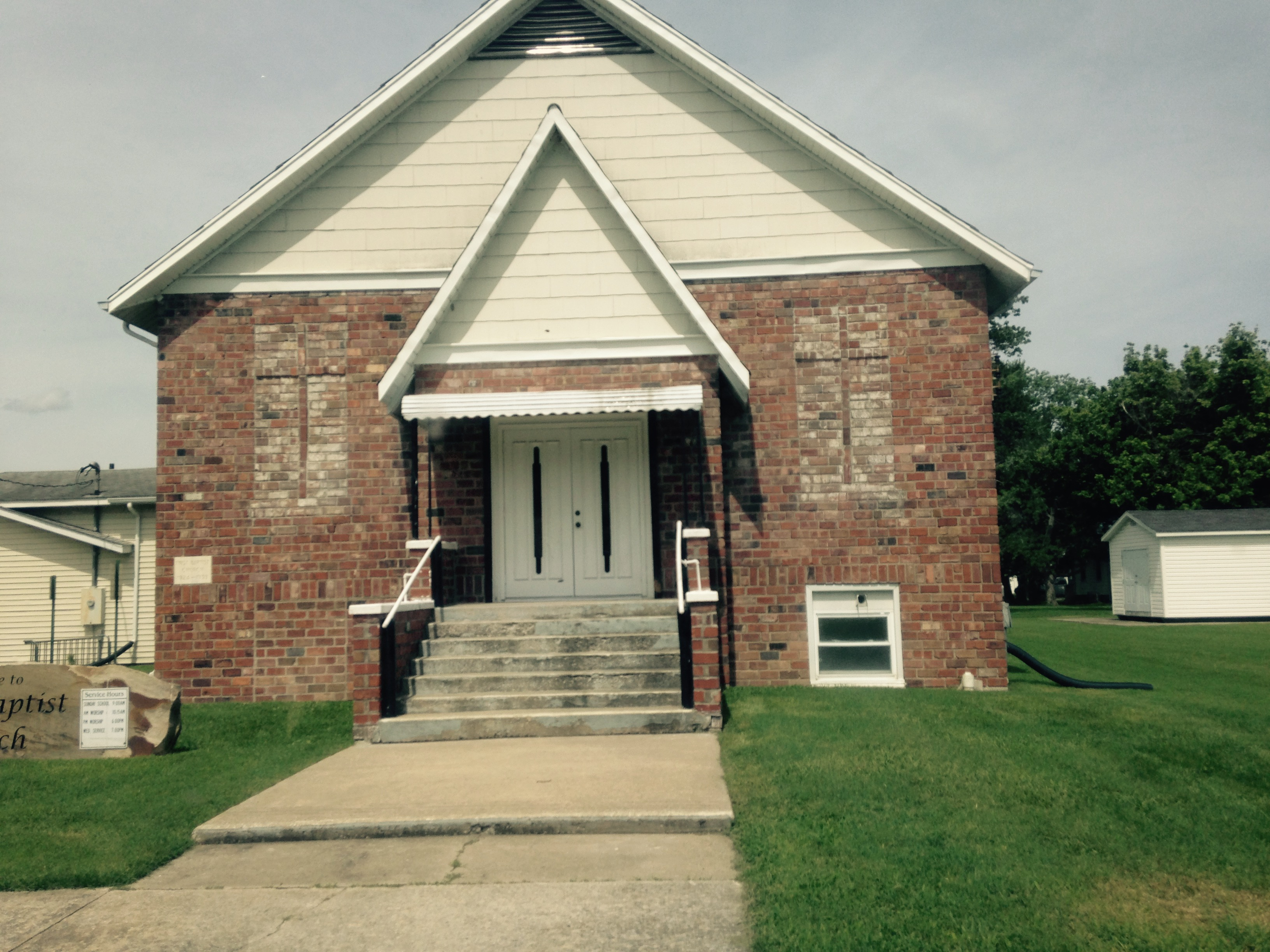
First United Presbyterian Church

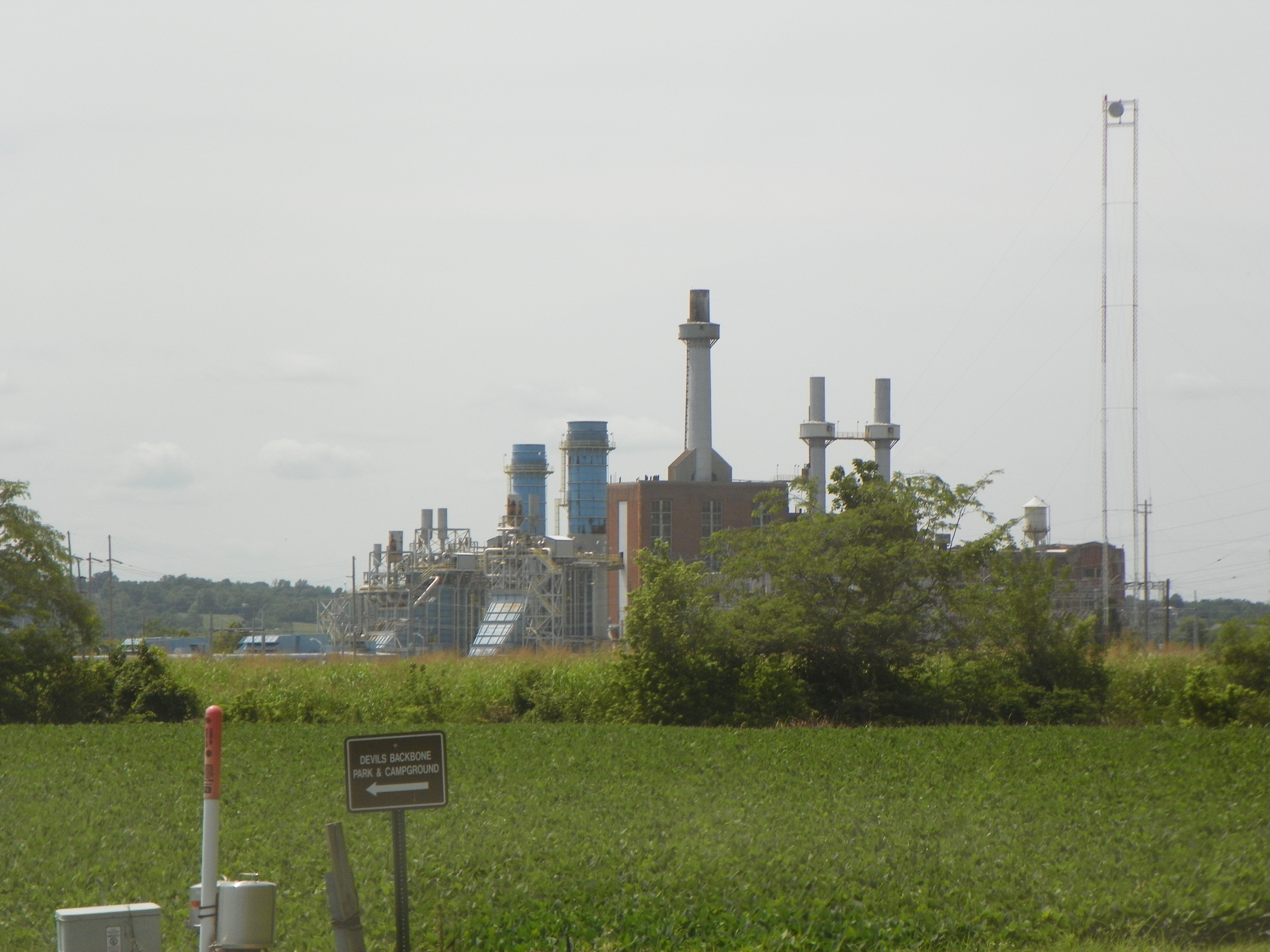
Grand Tower Energy Center
