= Illinois Route 138 =

State highway in Macoupin County, Illinois, US

Illinois Route 138
- IL 138 highlighted in red

Route information
- Maintained by IDOT
- Length: 14.95 mi (24.06 km)
- Existed: 1942–present

Major junctions
- West end: IL 159 in Bunker Hill
- I-55 in White City
- East end: Illinois Street in Mount Olive

Location
- Country: United States
- State: Illinois
- Counties: Macoupin

Highway system
- Illinois State Highway System; Interstate; US; State; Tollways; Scenic
← IL 137	→ IL 140

Illinois Route 138 is a state highway in southwestern Illinois. It runs from Illinois Route 159 north of Bunker Hill to the city of Mount Olive at Illinois Street, a former alignment of U.S. Route 66. This is a distance of 14.95 miles (24.06 km).

== Route description ==
Illinois 138 runs east–west, with a bend north through the city of Benld. It is a two-lane surface road for its entire length. South of Benld, it also overlaps Illinois Route 4 for a few miles.

== History ==
SBI Route 138 ran from Mount Carmel to Grayville; in 1937, this became Illinois Route 1. It was put on its current alignment in 1942, replacing parts of Illinois Route 38.

== Major intersections ==
The entire route is in Macoupin County.

Location	mi	km	Destinations	Notes
	0.0	0.0	IL 159	
Benld	9.1	14.6	IL 4 north	West end of IL 4 overlap
Benld	9.6	15.4	IL 4 south	South end of IL 4 overlap
White City	13.8	22.2	I-55 – East St. Louis, Springfield	I-55 exit 44
	14.1	22.7	Historic US 66	
Mount Olive	14.95	24.06	Historic US 66 (Illinois Street)	1930-1940 Historic US 66
1.000 mi = 1.609 km; 1.000 km = 0.621 mi
