= Muddy, Illinois =

Muddy
- Village
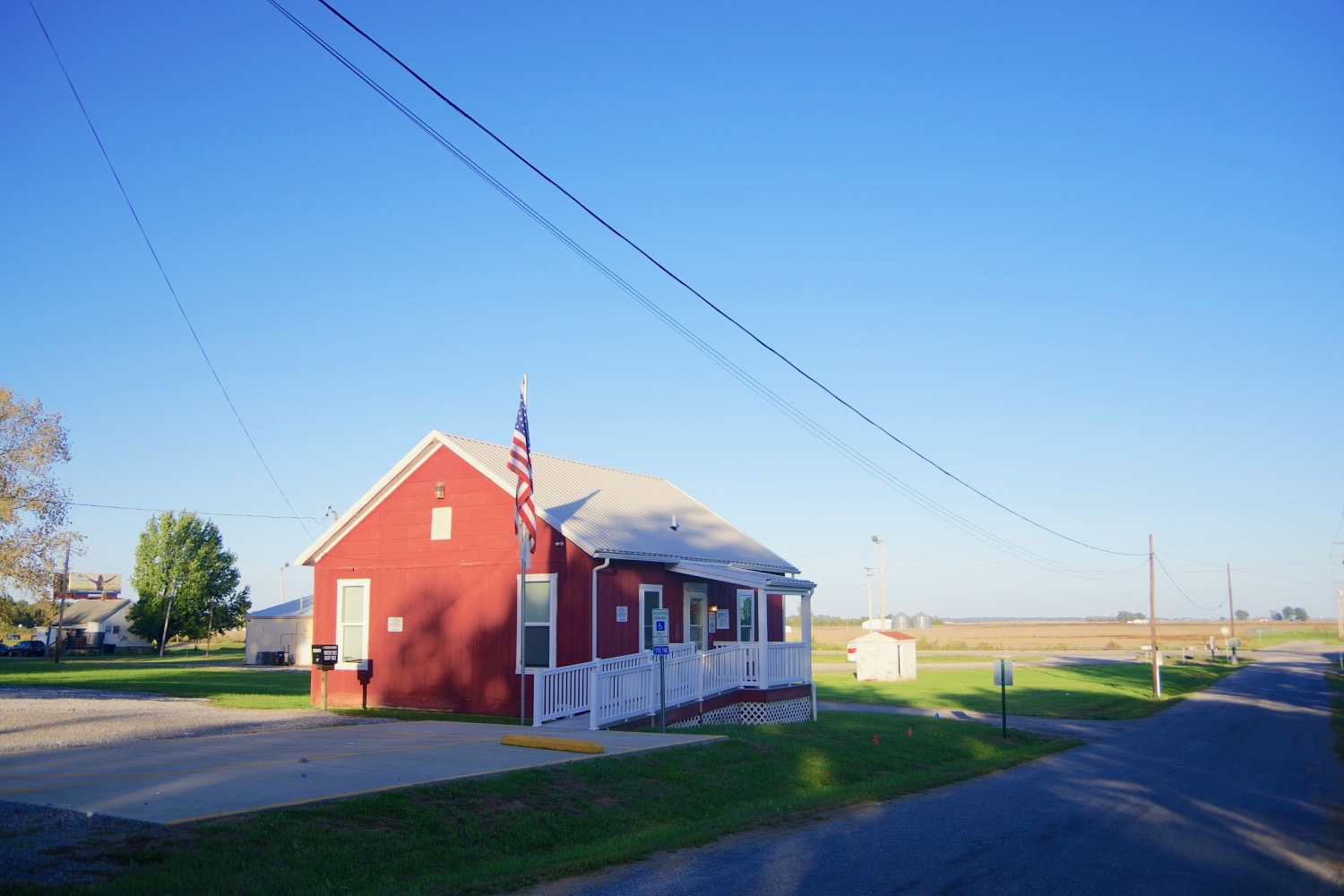
- Village Hall

- Location of Muddy in Saline County, Illinois.
- Coordinates: 37°45′56″N 88°30′50″W
- Country: United States
- State: Illinois
- County: Saline

Government
  - Village President: Frances Bertino

Area
  - Total: 0.31 sq mi (0.79 km^{2})
  - Land: 0.30 sq mi (0.78 km^{2})
  - Water: 0 sq mi (0.00 km^{2})
- Elevation: 374 ft (114 m)

Population (2020)
  - Total: 61
  - Density: 201.3/sq mi (77.71/km^{2})
- Time zone: UTC-6 (CST)
  - Summer (DST): UTC-5 (CDT)
- ZIP code: 62965
- Area code: 618
- FIPS code: 17-51271
- GNIS feature ID: 2399422

Muddy is a small incorporated village located in the Harrisburg Township in Saline County, Illinois, United States. As of the 2020 census, Muddy had a population of 61.

== History ==
During the 19th century, the site of Muddy was home to a small settlement known as Robinson's Ford, which was among the communities considered for the seat of Saline County after the county's creation in the 1840s. The modern village of Muddy had its start as a mining settlement established by the Harrisburg Big Muddy Coal Company, for which it was named, in 1903. The mine was sold to the larger O'Gara Coal Company in 1906.

The former St. Ioasaph Orthodox Church in Muddy, built in 1913, is dedicated to Ioasaph of Belgorod. The church was located on South St. at 37°45′56″N 88°31′21″W. This church was attended by eastern European immigrants, including Russians, Slovaks, Poles, and Rusyns. It was dismantled in 2019.

== Geography ==
Muddy lies along U.S. Route 45 northeast of Harrisburg and southwest of Eldorado. The Middle Fork of the Saline River flows just southwest of Muddy. The Tunnel Hill State Trail, a 45-mile (72 km) rail trail, passes through the village.

According to the 2010 census, Muddy has a total area of 0.301 square miles (0.78 km^{2}), of which 0.3 square miles (0.78 km^{2}) (or 99.67%) is land and 0.001 square miles (0.00 km^{2}) (or 0.33%) is water.

== Demographics ==
Historical population
Census	Pop.	Note	%±
1960	95		—
1970	109		14.7%
1980	88		−19.3%
1990	87		−1.1%
2000	78		−10.3%
2010	68		−12.8%
2020	61		−10.3%
U.S. Decennial Census

As of the census of 2000, there were 78 people, 34 households, and 21 families residing in the village. The population density was 296.9 inhabitants per square mile (114.6/km^{2}). There were 39 housing units at an average density of 148.5 per square mile (57.3/km^{2}). The racial makeup of the village was 88.46% White, 5.13% African American, 2.56% Native American, 3.85% from other races. Hispanic or Latino of any race were 3.85% of the population.

There were 34 households, out of which 38.2% had children under the age of 18 living with them, 44.1% were married couples living together, 8.8% had a female householder with no husband present, and 38.2% were non-families. 38.2% of all households were made up of individuals, and 8.8% had someone living alone who was 65 years of age or older. The average household size was 2.29 and the average family size was 2.95.

In the village, the population was spread out, with 24.4% under the age of 18, 17.9% from 18 to 24, 17.9% from 25 to 44, 26.9% from 45 to 64, and 12.8% who were 65 years of age or older. The median age was 34 years. For every 100 females, there were 110.8 males. For every 100 females age 18 and over, there were 90.3 males.

The median income for a household in the village was $24,375, and the median income for a family was $28,750. Males had a median income of $28,750 versus $28,250 for females. The per capita income for the village was $13,384. There were no families and 7.7% of the population living below the poverty line, including no under eighteens and none of those over 64.
