= Benld, Illinois =

- City
- Location in Macoupin County, Illinois
- Coordinates: 39°05′35″N 89°48′08″W
- Country: United States
- State: Illinois
- County: Macoupin
- Townships: Cahokia, Gillespie

Area
  - Total: 1.06 sq mi (2.75 km^{2})
  - Land: 1.06 sq mi (2.75 km^{2})
  - Water: 0 sq mi (0.00 km^{2})
- Elevation: 620 ft (190 m)

Population (2020)
  - Total: 1,464
  - Density: 1,381.1/sq mi (533.24/km^{2})
- Time zone: UTC-6 (CST)
  - Summer (DST): UTC-5 (CDT)
- ZIP code: 62009
- Area code(s): 217, 447
- FIPS code: 17-05209
- GNIS feature ID: 2394134

Benld (pronounced /bəˈnɛld/ bə-NELD) is a city in Macoupin County, Illinois, United States. The population was 1,464 at the 2020 census, down from 1,556 in 2010. It is located in the Metro-East portion of the Greater St. Louis metropolitan area.

Benld was declared the "most difficult to pronounce" place name in the state of Illinois by Reader's Digest.

== History ==
Benld was established in 1903. The name derives from founder Benjamin L. Dorsey (d. June 19, 1895), who was responsible for gaining the land on which the town was built and coal mining rights. "Benld" is the combination of Dorsey's first name and his middle and last initial.

The village was home to St. Mary's Russian Orthodox church until 2010. Opened in 1901 by Carpatho-Rusyn immigrants, Holy Dormition was converted to a Monastery in 2010. The church was founded to serve the immigrant mining community.

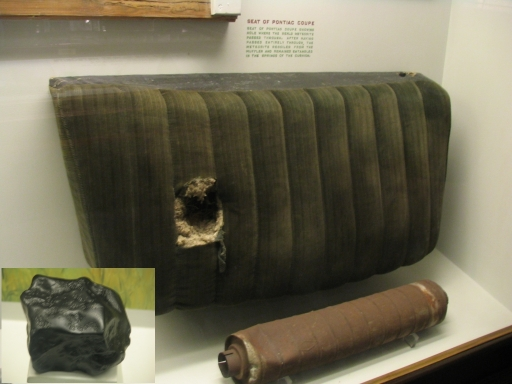
Photo of the car seat and muffler hit by the Benld meteorite with the meteorite inset.

On September 29, 1938, a meteorite landed in Benld, marking only the third meteorite landing in Illinois since records were kept. It is one of the few known meteorites to strike a man-made object, punching a hole in the roof of Edward McCain's garage and embedding itself in the seat of his 1928 Pontiac coupe. A neighbor, Mrs. Carl Crum, was standing about 50 feet from the impact and may be the individual who came closest to being struck by a meteorite in history up to that time. The meteorite and portions of the car are now on display at the Field Museum of Natural History in Chicago.

In March 2009, the seven-year-old Benld Elementary school was damaged beyond repair and ultimately condemned. The damage was caused by mine subsidence and left more than 700 students without a school. The students were moved to the Gillespie High School and Middle School campus, where they finished the remainder of the year on a split shift schedule. High school and middle school students attended school from 6:30am to noon, and elementary aged students attended from 12:30pm until 5:00 pm. The students started the 2010 school year on the split shift. On November 2, 2010, all students returned to a normal schedule, with the elementary children attending class in three different locations (modular units, middle school classrooms, and the S.S. Simon & Jude Catholic School). The district was allowed to collect only $350,000 in mine subsidence insurance due to limits imposed by the state of Illinois. The district is in line to receive funding from the Capital Development Board to help with the construction of a new elementary school. The school is responsible for 20% of the $22 million budget to build a new school. The school district is actively pursuing grants to fulfill their responsibility. The Ben-Gil Boosters, an organization formed to help raise funds for the construction of the new school, won $250,000 in April 2010 through Pepsi's Refresh Everything Campaign. The new school is adjacent to the district's middle school and high school in Gillespie. Its name has been changed to Ben-Gil Elementary School, to reflect both communities.

At a special CUSD 7 Board of Education meeting on August 16, 2017, the board approved a $4 million settlement with the Union Pacific Railroad, legal owners of the assets of the former Superior Coal Company, in connection with the subsidence. Originally, the district had been awarded $9.85 million in 2014, but Union Pacific appealed that ruling.

== Geography ==
Benld is located in southeastern Macoupin County in the southwest corner of Cahokia Township. It is bordered to the south by the village of Sawyerville and to the northwest by the village of Mount Clare.

Illinois Route 4 runs along the western border of Benld, leading north 2.5 miles (4.0 km) to Gillespie and south 6 miles (10 km) to Staunton. Route 4 leads north 15 miles (24 km) to Carlinville, the Macoupin county seat. Illinois Route 138 passes through the center of Benld as Central Street and South 8th Street, leading southeast 4 miles (6 km) to White City and Interstate 55. St. Louis is 45 miles (72 km) southwest of Benld.

According to the U.S. Census Bureau, Benld has a total area of 1.06 square miles (2.75 km^{2}), all land. A small unnamed runs through the center of Benld, flowing south to Cahokia Creek, a southwest-flowing direct tributary of the Mississippi River.

== Demographics ==
Historical population
| Census | Pop. | Note | %± |
|---|---|---|---|
| 1910 | 1,912 | | — |
| 1920 | 3,316 | | 73.4% |
| 1930 | 2,980 | | −10.1% |
| 1940 | 2,444 | | −18.0% |
| 1950 | 2,093 | | −14.4% |
| 1960 | 1,848 | | −11.7% |
| 1970 | 1,736 | | −6.1% |
| 1980 | 1,638 | | −5.6% |
| 1990 | 1,604 | | −2.1% |
| 2000 | 1,541 | | −3.9% |
| 2010 | 1,556 | | 1.0% |
| 2020 | 1,464 | | −5.9% |
U.S. Decennial Census

=== 2020 census ===
As of the 2020 census there were 1,464 people, 594 households, and 395 families residing in the city. The population density was 1,381.13 inhabitants per square mile (533.26/km^{2}). There were 721 housing units at an average density of 680.19 per square mile (262.62/km^{2}). 13.9% of the housing units were vacant. The homeowner vacancy rate was 2.1% and the rental vacancy rate was 7.6%. The racial makeup of the city was 91.87% White, 0.48% African American, 0.48% Native American, 0.20% Asian, 0.00% Pacific Islander, 0.20% from other races, and 6.76% from two or more races. Hispanic or Latino of any race were 1.98% of the population.

There were 594 households, out of which 37.5% had children under the age of 18 living with them, 44.11% were married couples living together, 13.97% had a female householder with no husband present, and 33.50% were non-families. 24.75% of all households were made up of individuals, and 11.11% had someone living alone who was 65 years of age or older. The average household size was 3.24 and the average family size was 2.68.

The city's age distribution consisted of 26.0% under the age of 18, 8.7% from 18 to 24, 26.8% from 25 to 44, 20% from 45 to 64, and 18.4% who were 65 years of age or older. The median age was 38.3 years. For every 100 females, there were 113.4 males. For every 100 females age 18 and over, there were 115.5 males.

The median income for a household in the city was $41,786, and the median income for a family was $54,911. Males had a median income of $31,667 versus $20,284 for females. The per capita income for the city was $20,221. About 21.0% of families and 28.0% of the population were below the poverty line, including 44.2% of those under age 18 and 5.4% of those age 65 or over.

Racial composition as of the 2020 census
| Race | Number | Percent |
|---|---|---|
| White | 1,345 | 91.9% |
| Black or African American | 7 | 0.5% |
| American Indian and Alaska Native | 7 | 0.5% |
| Asian | 3 | 0.2% |
| Native Hawaiian and Other Pacific Islander | 0 | 0.0% |
| Some other race | 3 | 0.2% |
| Two or more races | 99 | 6.8% |
| Hispanic or Latino (of any race) | 29 | 2.0% |

== Notable people ==
- A. C. Bartulis (1927–2011), politician and businessman; born in Benld

== See also ==
- List of cities in Illinois
