= National Register of Historic Places listings in Madison County, Illinois =

Location of Madison County in Illinois

This is a list of the National Register of Historic Places listings in Madison County, Illinois.

This is intended to be a complete list of the properties and districts on the National Register of Historic Places in Madison County, Illinois, United States. Latitude and longitude coordinates are provided for many National Register properties and districts; these locations may be seen together in a map.

There are 44 properties and districts listed on the National Register in the county, including 2 National Historic Landmarks. Another two properties were once listed but have been removed.

This National Park Service list is complete through NPS recent listings posted September 25, 2026.

== Current listings ==
| | Name on the Register | Image | Date listed | Location | City or town | Description |
|---|---|---|---|---|---|---|
| 1 | Alton Chapter House | Alton Chapter House | November 28, 1980 (#80001388) | 509 Beacon St. 38°53′35″N 90°11′24″W | Alton | |
| 2 | Alton Gas & Electric Power House | Alton Gas & Electric Power House | August 28, 2019 (#100004309) | 700 W. Broadway; 38°53′39″N 90°11′47″W | Alton | |
| 3 | Alton Military Prison Site | Alton Military Prison Site | December 31, 1974 (#74000766) | Inside the block bounded by Broadway and William, 4th, and Mill Sts. 38°53′29″N 90°11′22″W | Alton | |
| 4 | Alton National Cemetery | Alton National Cemetery | May 5, 2011 (#11000245) | 600 Pearl St. 38°53′26″N 90°09′48″W | Alton | |
| 5 | AT&T Booster Station | | May 1, 2026 (#100012953) | 119 S. Main Street; 38°48′38″N 89°57′20″W | Edwardsville | |
| 6 | Berleman House | Berleman House | March 27, 1980 (#80001391) | 115 S. Main St. 38°48′39″N 89°57′21″W | Edwardsville | |
| 7 | Bethalto Village Hall | Bethalto Village Hall | December 2, 1987 (#87002049) | 124 Main St. 38°54′36″N 90°02′31″W | Bethalto | |
| 8 | Brooks Catsup Bottle Water Tower | Brooks Catsup Bottle Water Tower | August 13, 2002 (#02000847) | 800 South Morrison Ave. 38°39′46″N 89°58′56″W | Collinsville | |
| 9 | Cahokia Mounds | Cahokia Mounds | October 15, 1966 (#66000899) | 7850 Collinsville Rd., Cahokia Mounds State Park; 38°39′36″N 90°03′44″W | Collinsville | World Heritage Site. Extends into St. Clair County |
| 10 | John Carney House | John Carney House | July 28, 1983 (#83000327) | 306 E. Market St. 38°43′44″N 89°52′44″W | Troy | |
| 11 | Chain of Rocks Bridge | Chain of Rocks Bridge | December 1, 2006 (#06001091) | West Chain of Rocks Rd. 38°45′41″N 90°10′26″W | Madison | |
| 12 | Christian Hill Historic District | Christian Hill Historic District | May 22, 1978 (#78001165) | Roughly bounded by Broadway, Belle, 7th, Cliff, Bluff, and State Sts. 38°53′42″N 90°11′32″W | Alton | |
| 13 | Daniel Dove Collins House | Daniel Dove Collins House | November 21, 2002 (#02001385) | 621 W. Main St. 38°40′04″N 89°59′37″W | Collinsville | |
| 14 | Collinsville City Hall and Fire Station | Collinsville City Hall and Fire Station | August 20, 2004 (#04000865) | 125 S. Center St. 38°40′09″N 89°59′10″W | Collinsville | |
| 15 | Collinsville Masonic Temple Lodge No. 712 A.F. & A.M. | Collinsville Masonic Temple Lodge No. 712 A.F. & A.M. | May 22, 2005 (#05000430) | 213 W. Clay St. 38°40′14″N 89°59′19″W | Collinsville | |
| 16 | Collinsville Township High School | | August 21, 2023 (#100009253) | 1203 Vandalia St. 38°40′58″N 89°58′40″W | Collinsville | |
| 17 | Edwardsville Chapter House | Edwardsville Chapter House | November 28, 1980 (#80001392) | 515 W. High St. 38°48′51″N 89°57′43″W | Edwardsville | |
| 18 | Emmert-Zippel House | Emmert-Zippel House | May 2, 1996 (#96000511) | 3279 Maryville Rd., 2 miles (3.2 km) north of Illinois Route 162; 38°43′20″N 90°06′14″W | Granite City | |
| 19 | Glen Carbon Grade School | Glen Carbon Grade School | August 25, 2014 (#14000507) | 124 School St. 38°44′55″N 89°58′43″W | Glen Carbon | |
| 20 | Glen Carbon Village Hall and Firehouse | | April 19, 2018 (#100002326) | 180 Summit Ave. 38°44′56″N 89°58′46″W | Glen Carbon | |
| 21 | Benjamin Godfrey Memorial Chapel | Benjamin Godfrey Memorial Chapel | May 10, 1979 (#79000856) | Godfrey Rd. 38°57′01″N 90°11′29″W | Godfrey | |
| 22 | Granite City YMCA | Granite City YMCA | September 5, 2017 (#100001564) | 2001 Edison Ave. 38°42′06″N 90°08′56″W | Granite City | |
| 23 | Guertler House | Guertler House | July 30, 1974 (#74000767) | 101 Blair St. 38°54′03″N 90°10′58″W | Alton | |
| 24 | Haskell Playhouse | Haskell Playhouse | July 30, 1974 (#74000768) | Henry St. in Haskell Park; 38°53′55″N 90°10′33″W | Alton | |
| 25 | Horseshoe Lake Mound and Village Site | Horseshoe Lake Mound and Village Site | November 26, 1980 (#80001396) | Southwest of the junction of Illinois Route 111 and Horseshoe Lake Rd. 38°42′15″N 90°04′07″W | Granite City | |
| 26 | Hotel Stratford | Hotel Stratford | January 27, 2000 (#99001709) | 229 Market St. 38°53′27″N 90°11′06″W | Alton | |
| 27 | William W. Jarvis House | William W. Jarvis House | February 3, 1988 (#87002514) | 317 E. Center St. 38°43′36″N 89°52′36″W | Troy | |
| 28 | Kuhn Station Site | Kuhn Station Site | November 25, 1980 (#80001393) | Rosewood Hills Dr. 38°47′11″N 89°51′38″W | Edwardsville | |
| 29 | LeClaire Historic District | LeClaire Historic District | August 8, 1979 (#79000855) | Roughly bounded by the railroad tracks, Wolf St., and Hadley and Madison; 38°48′00″N 89°57′00″W | Edwardsville | |
| 30 | Marine Chapter House | Marine Chapter House | November 28, 1980 (#80001397) | Silver St. 38°47′20″N 89°46′36″W | Marine | |
| 31 | Middletown Historic District | Middletown Historic District | July 11, 1978 (#78001166) | Roughly bounded by Broadway, Market, Alton, Franklin, Common, Liberty, Humboldt, and Plum Sts.; also 3rd St. between Market and Piasa St.; also roughly bounded by Front, State, Fourth, Market, Broadway, Third, Alby, Langdon, and Ridge Sts. 38°53′41″N 90°10′28″W | Alton | Second and third sets of boundaries represents boundary increases of September 16, 1982 and January 4, 2022 |
| 32 | Miners Institute Building | Miners Institute Building | August 29, 1985 (#85001913) | 204 W. Main; 38°40′10″N 89°59′15″W | Collinsville | |
| 33 | Mitchell Archeological Site | Mitchell Archeological Site | February 7, 1978 (#78001168) | Western end of University Dr. 38°45′32″N 90°05′10″W | Mitchell | A boundary increase was approved April 15, 2024. |
| 34 | Mount Lookout | Mount Lookout | June 17, 1980 (#80001389) | 2018 Alby Street; 38°54′21″N 90°11′01″W | Alton | |
| 35 | Narodni Sin | Narodni Sin | November 21, 2002 (#02001353) | 209-211 E. Vandalia; 38°48′49″N 89°57′13″W | Edwardsville | |
| 36 | Post House | Post House | May 28, 1980 (#80001390) | 1516 State St. 38°54′22″N 90°11′43″W | Alton | |
| 37 | Salem Baptist Church | Salem Baptist Church | December 31, 2013 (#13001004) | 2001 Seiler Rd. 38°58′01″N 90°07′21″W | Alton | |
| 38 | St. Louis Street Historic District | St. Louis Street Historic District | May 9, 1983 (#83000328) | 603-1306 St. Louis St. 38°48′39″N 89°58′07″W | Edwardsville | |
| 39 | State Bank Building | State Bank Building | April 23, 2010 (#09000233) | 102 W. Main St. 38°48′25″N 89°57′09″W | Collinsville | |
| 40 | Benjamin Stephenson House | Benjamin Stephenson House | May 31, 1980 (#80001395) | 409 S. Buchanan St. 38°48′25″N 89°57′09″W | Edwardsville | |
| 41 | Lyman Trumbull House | Lyman Trumbull House | May 15, 1975 (#75000667) | 1105 Henry St. 38°53′51″N 90°10′34″W | Alton | |
| 42 | Upper Alton Historic District | Upper Alton Historic District | May 2, 1978 (#78001167) | Seminary St., College, Leverett, and Evergreen Aves. 38°54′17″N 90°08′34″W | Alton | |
| 43 | John Weir House | John Weir House | May 9, 1983 (#83000329) | 715 N. Main St. 38°48′59″N 89°57′42″W | Edwardsville | |
| 44 | Yakel House and Union Brewery | Yakel House and Union Brewery | May 11, 1982 (#82002585) | 1421-1431 Pearl St. 38°53′35″N 90°09′51″W | Alton | |

== Former listings ==
| | Name on the Register | Image | Date listed | Date removed | Location | City or town | Description |
|---|---|---|---|---|---|---|---|
| 1 | Madison County Sheriff's House and Jail | Madison County Sheriff's House and Jail | May 31, 1980 (#80001394) | January 2, 2020 | 210 N. Main St. 38°48′48″N 89°57′27″W | Edwardsville | |
| 2 | Rutherford House | | March 19, 1982 (#82002584) | December 8, 1995 | 1006 Pearl St. | Alton | Demolished in June, 1995. |

== See also ==
- List of National Historic Landmarks in Illinois
- National Register of Historic Places listings in Illinois
