= List of City of Edwardsville Register of Historic Landmarks =

List of local historic sites in Edwardsville, Illinois

Historic Landmarks and Districts is a designation of the Historic Preservation Commission (HPC). Many of these landmarks are also listed on the National Register of Historic Places.

== Historic Preservation Commission ==
The Historic Preservation Commission (HPC) approves new historic districts and landmarks. It was established in 1977.

=== Individual landmarks ===
Landmark Name	Image	Location	Built	Designation date	NRHP date
Berlemann House		115 South Main Street	1865	May-1980	3/27/1980
Benjamin Stephenson House		409 South Buchanan Street	1820	Jul-1980	5/31/1980
American Woman's League Chapter House		515 West High Street	1909	May-1991	11/18/1980
Madison County Historical Museum John Weir Home		715 North Main Street	1836	Aug-1985	5/9/1983
Madison County Centennial Monument (Centennial Memorial Monument)		Edwardsville City Park	1912	Jul-1985	N/A
Wildey Theater		252 North Main Street	1909	Jul-1986	N/A
Columbus Attendance Center		315 North Kansas Street	1886	Jul-1986	N/A
Mateer Funeral Home "Prickett House"		210 North Kansas Street	1854	Aug-1987	N/A
Chapman House		234 Leverett Lane	1857 (razed 1998)	Sep-1990	N/A
Colonial Agency Gabriel Oestrich House		1501 North Main Street	1853	Mar-1991	N/A
Narodni Sin (Czech National Hall) (Lodge Svobodny Rolnick #26)		209-211 E. Vandalia Street	1906	Mar-1991	2002
Judge Wm.Tyler Brown House		104 Springer Avenue	1854	May-1991	N/A
Wabash Hotel		1101 North Main Street	1839 – 40	Dec-1991	N/A
Madison County Courthouse		155 North Main Street	1915	Dec-1991	N/A
"Log Cabin" House		1712 North Main Street	1805	Apr-1992	N/A
Lusk Memorial Cemetery		Randle Street	1818	Jun-1992	N/A
Old Post Office		201 Hillsboro Avenue	1913	Jul-1992	N/A
Klingel House		1801 North Main Street	1859	Jul-1992	N/A
Immanuel Methodist Church		800 North Main Street	1882	May-1993	N/A
Happy House		722 Hillsboro Road	1879-80	May-1993	N/A
Edwardsville Public Library		112 South Kansas Street	1906	May-1993	N/A
Farmers Mill Warehouse		207 West High Street	1895	May-1993	N/A
The Hoffmann House		128 St. Andrews Street	1872	Mar-1994	N/A
The Koenig-Deal House		100 East "O" Street	1866	Mar-1994	N/A
The Krafft House		1310 North Main Street	1830	Mar-1994	N/A
The Keller House		327 Clay Street	1883	Mar-1994	N/A
The Klingel-Balke House		400 West Park Street	1857	Mar-1994	N/A
Grandma Littleton/Giese House		331 North Buchanan Street	1893	Jan-1996	N/A
Ballard Cemetery		Outlot A, Parkview Ridge Center Grove Road, Edwardsville	1847	Jan-1996	N/A
Site of Abraham Lincoln's Speech September 11, 1858 (Madison County Courthouse)		155 North Main Street	1858	Jul-1997	N/A
Site of Pogue Store		1201 North Main Street	1819	Jul-1997	N/A
Coles Monument		Rt. 157 at Lewis Road	1929	Aug-1998	N/A
John Sebastian Trares Building		222-224-226 North Main Street	1885	Mar-1999	N/A
Bohm Building		100 Main Street	1910	Jun-1999	N/A
Lincoln School		1210 North Main Street	1911	Jun-1999	N/A
Madison County Poor Farm		333 S. Main Street	c. 1861 Razed in 2009	Dec-2000	N/A
Dippold House		923 Grand Avenue	1895	Oct-2023	N/A
Lustron House		1320 Grand Avenue	1949 Razed in 2013	Nov-2007	N/A
Religious Center (Geodesic Dome)		Southern Illinois University Campus	1971	Aug-2023	N/A
E. Breese Glass House		647 Hillsboro Avenue	Mid-1870s	Jul-2023	N/A
Ryderus C. & Emily Peters Springer Gillham House		112 Springer Avenue	1891	Jul-2009	N/A
Boeschenstein-Levi House		230 North Kansas Street	1906	Sept-2010	N/A
Bardelmeier House		118 South Main Street	1881-1886	Sept-2010	N/A
Simon Kellerman House		416 N. Fillmore Street	1894		N/A
Windelar House		502 N. Fillmore Street	1895-96		N/A
Dr. Eugene Wahl House		215 Commercial Street	1923	2014	N/A
Woodlawn Cemetery		St. Louis Street	1871	2014	N/A
William Halleck Jones House		#8 Halleck Avenue	Circa 1852–1870		N/A
Daniel Tolman House		1301 North Main St.	1819	2013	N/A

=== Historic Districts ===
==== National Historic Districts ====
- Leclaire Historic District
- St. Louis Street Historic District

==== Local Historic Districts ====
- Brick Street Landmark District
- Downtown Historic District

== See also ==
- National Register of Historic Places listings in Madison County, Illinois
