= Middletown Historic District =

Middletown Historic District may refer to:

== United States ==
(by state then city)

- Middletown Upper Houses Historic District, Cromwell, Connecticut, listed on the National Register of Historic Places (NRHP) in Middlesex County, Connecticut
- Middletown South Green Historic District, Middletown, Connecticut, listed on the NRHP in Middlesex County, Connecticut
- Middletown Historic District (Middletown, Delaware), listed on the NRHP in New Castle County, Delaware
- Middletown Historic District (Alton, Illinois), listed on the NRHP in Madison County, Illinois
- Middletown Historic District (Middletown, Maryland), listed on the NRHP in Frederick County, Maryland
- Middletown Village Historic District, Middletown, New Jersey, listed on the NRHP in Monmouth County, New Jersey
- West Middletown Historic District, West Middletown Borough, Pennsylvania, listed on the NRHP in Washington County, Pennsylvania
- Middletown Rural Historic District, Grafton, Vermont, listed on the NRHP in Windham County, Vermont
- Middletown Springs Historic District, Middletown Springs, Vermont, listed on the NRHP in Rutland County, Vermont
- Middletown Historic District (Middletown, Virginia), listed on the NRHP in Frederick County, Virginia
