= Post House =

Post House or post house may refer to:

- A stilt house also known as a pile dwelling, a historic house type
- A post-production studio
- Post house (historical building), a house or inn with a stable that provided services to travelers and mail carriers

in the United States (by state then city/town)

- Joseph W. Post House, Big Sur, California, listed on the National Register of Historic Places (NRHP) in Monterey County
- George B. Post House, Pasadena, California, listed on the NRHP in Los Angeles County
- Augustus Post House, Hebron, Connecticut, listed on the NRHP in Tolland County
- Post House (Alton, Illinois), listed on the NRHP in Madison County
- Peter P. Post House, Woodcliff, New Jersey, listed on the NRHP in Bergen County
- Post-Williams House, Poughkeepsie, New York, listed on the NRHP
- William Post Mansion, Buckhannon, West Virginia, listed on the NRHP in Upshur County

== See also ==
- List of United States post offices, as post house might be an alternate name for "post office"
