= Shipman, Illinois =

- Village
- Location in Macoupin County, Illinois
- Coordinates: 39°07′24″N 90°02′45″W
- Country: United States
- State: Illinois
- County: Macoupin
- Townships: Shipman, Hillyard

Area
  - Total: 1.33 sq mi (3.45 km^{2})
  - Land: 1.32 sq mi (3.42 km^{2})
  - Water: 0.012 sq mi (0.03 km^{2})
- Elevation: 627 ft (191 m)

Population (2020)
  - Total: 511
  - Density: 387.0/sq mi (149.43/km^{2})
- Time zone: UTC-6 (CST)
  - Summer (DST): UTC-5 (CDT)
- ZIP code: 62685
- Area code: 618
- FIPS code: 17-69563
- GNIS feature ID: 2397657

Shipman is a village in Macoupin County, Illinois, United States. The population was 511 at the 2020 census, down from 624 in 2010.

== Geography ==
Shipman is located in southwestern Macoupin County. Illinois Route 16 passes through the south side of the village as Railroad Street; it leads east 13 miles (21 km) to Gillespie and west 15 miles (24 km) to Jerseyville. Carlinville, the Macoupin county seat, is 15 miles (24 km) to the northeast by local roads.

According to the 2021 census gazetteer files, Shipman has a total area of 1.33 square miles (3.44 km^{2}), of which 1.32 square miles (3.42 km^{2}) (or 99.02%) is land and 0.01 square miles (0.03 km^{2}) (or 0.98%) is water.

== Demographics ==
Historical population
Census	Pop.	Note	%±
1880	485		—
1890	410		−15.5%
1900	396		−3.4%
1910	392		−1.0%
1920	333		−15.1%
1930	308		−7.5%
1940	372		20.8%
1950	376		1.1%
1960	417		10.9%
1970	482		15.6%
1980	581		20.5%
1990	624		7.4%
2000	655		5.0%
2010	624		−4.7%
2020	511		−18.1%
U.S. Decennial Census

As of the 2020 census there were 511 people, 230 households, and 161 families residing in the town. The population density was 383.35 inhabitants per square mile (148.01/km^{2}). There were 235 housing units at an average density of 176.29 per square mile (68.07/km^{2}). The racial makeup of the town was 92.37% White, 0.59% African American, 0.00% Native American, 0.00% Asian, 0.00% Pacific Islander, 0.78% from other races, and 6.26% from two or more races. Hispanic or Latino of any race were 1.37% of the population.

There were 230 households, out of which 34.3% had children under the age of 18 living with them, 52.61% were married couples living together, 6.09% had a female householder with no husband present, and 30.00% were non-families. 25.22% of all households were made up of individuals, and 8.70% had someone living alone who was 65 years of age or older. The average household size was 3.27 and the average family size was 2.68.

The town's age distribution consisted of 28.7% under the age of 18, 9.3% from 18 to 24, 23% from 25 to 44, 21.7% from 45 to 64, and 17.2% who were 65 years of age or older. The median age was 35.5 years. For every 100 females, there were 91.9 males. For every 100 females age 18 and over, there were 112.1 males.

The median income for a household in the town was $46,944, and the median income for a family was $57,614. Males had a median income of $42,386 versus $26,250 for females. The per capita income for the town was $21,889. About 4.3% of families and 8.9% of the population were below the poverty line, including 5.1% of those under age 18 and 1.9% of those age 65 or over.

== Notable people ==
Museum registrar Helena M. Weiss was raised in Shipman.
