= Bunker Hill Township =

Bunker Hill Township may refer to the following places in the United States:

- Bunker Hill Township, Macoupin County, Illinois
- Bunker Hill Township, Michigan
