= Lake Piasa, Illinois =

Lake Piasa
- Unincorporated community
- Location of Lake Piasa within Illinois Lake Piasa (the United States)
- Coordinates: 39°01′22″N 90°11′26″W
- Country: United States
- State: Illinois
- County: Jersey
- Township: Piasa
- Elevation: 620 ft (190 m)
- Time zone: UTC-6 (CST)
  - Summer (DST): UTC-5 (CDT)
- Area code: 618
- GNIS feature ID: 1747829

Lake Piasa is an unincorporated community in Jersey County, Illinois, United States. It is located west of Brighton and about five miles north of Godfrey.
