= Madison House =

Madison House may refer to:

== Canada ==
- Madison House (Kincardine, Ontario), a locally listed historic house

== United States ==
- Madison House (Watsonville, California), listed on the NRHP in Santa Cruz County, California
- Madison Seminary and Home, Madison, Ohio, listed on the NRHP in Lake County, Ohio
- Allen-Madison House, North Kingstown, Rhode Island, NRHP-listed
- Madison Ranch, Rapid City, South Dakota, listed on the NRHP in Pennington County, South Dakota
- Pap Madison Cabin, Rapid City, South Dakota, listed on the NRHP in Pennington County, South Dakota
- 126 Madison Avenue, New York City, a residential skyscraper.
- Madison House Publishers, Inc., an American publishing company bought by Rowman & Littlefield in 2000

== See also ==
- Montpelier (Orange, Virginia), estate home of U.S. president James Madison
- Madison Farm Historic and Archeological District, Elliston, listed on the NRHP in Montgomery County
- Madison County Sheriff's House and Jail, Edwardsville, Illinois, listed on the NRHP in Madison County
- Eutaw-Madison Apartment House Historic District, Baltimore, Maryland, NRHP-listed
- Madison Barracks, Sackets Harbor, New York, NRHP-listed
- Madison Gas and Electric Company Powerhouse, Madison, Wisconsin, listed on the NRHP in Dane County
- Madison Hotel (disambiguation)
