= Piasa Township, Jersey County, Illinois =

Piasa Township
- Township
- Location in Jersey County

- Jersey County's location in Illinois
- Coordinates: 39°02′56″N 90°12′31″W
- Country: United States
- State: Illinois
- County: Jersey
- Established: November 5, 1878

Area
  - Total: 36.46 sq mi (94.4 km^{2})
  - Land: 36.35 sq mi (94.1 km^{2})
  - Water: 0.11 sq mi (0.28 km^{2}) 0.30%
- Elevation: 590 ft (180 m)

Population (2020)
  - Total: 3,152
  - Density: 86.71/sq mi (33.48/km^{2})
- Time zone: UTC-6 (CST)
  - Summer (DST): UTC-5 (CDT)
- ZIP codes: 62012, 62035, 62052
- FIPS code: 17-083-59598

Piasa Township is one of eleven townships in Jersey County, Illinois, United States. As of the 2020 census, its population was 3,152 and it contained 1,327 housing units.

== Geography ==
According to the 2021 census gazetteer files, Piasa Township has a total area of 36.46 square miles (94.43 km^{2}), of which 36.35 square miles (94.15 km^{2}) (or 99.70%) is land and 0.11 square miles (0.28 km^{2}) (or 0.30%) is water.

=== Cities, towns, villages ===
- Brighton (western portion)

=== Unincorporated towns ===
- Lake Piasa

=== Adjacent townships ===
- Fidelity Township (north)
- Shipman Township, Macoupin County (northeast)
- Brighton Township, Macoupin County (east)
- Foster Township, Madison County (southeast)
- Godfrey Township, Madison County (south)
- Mississippi Township (west)
- Jersey Township (northwest)

=== Cemeteries ===
The township contains these five cemeteries: Botts, Edwards, Eldridge, Marston and Saint Alphonsus.

=== Major highways ===
- U.S. Route 67
- Illinois Route 267/111

=== Lakes ===
- Thunderbird Lake

== Demographics ==
As of the 2020 census there were 3,152 people, 1,133 households, and 848 families residing in the township. The population density was 86.46 inhabitants per square mile (33.38/km^{2}). There were 1,327 housing units at an average density of 36.40 per square mile (14.05/km^{2}). The racial makeup of the township was 94.00% White, 0.76% African American, 0.22% Native American, 0.19% Asian, 0.00% Pacific Islander, 0.38% from other races, and 4.44% from two or more races. Hispanic or Latino of any race were 2.03% of the population.

There were 1,133 households, out of which 31.10% had children under the age of 18 living with them, 59.58% were married couples living together, 11.65% had a female householder with no spouse present, and 25.15% were non-families. 18.40% of all households were made up of individuals, and 7.70% had someone living alone who was 65 years of age or older. The average household size was 2.81 and the average family size was 3.19.

The township's age distribution consisted of 18.0% under the age of 18, 8.7% from 18 to 24, 26.3% from 25 to 44, 28.4% from 45 to 64, and 18.5% who were 65 years of age or older. The median age was 43.0 years. For every 100 females, there were 104.6 males. For every 100 females age 18 and over, there were 91.5 males.

The median income for a household in the township was $82,951, and the median income for a family was $90,242. Males had a median income of $55,129 versus $30,898 for females. The per capita income for the township was $32,115. About 1.4% of families and 4.0% of the population were below the poverty line, including 1.7% of those under age 18 and none of those age 65 or over.

Historical population
Census	Pop.	Note	%±
2000	3,058		—
2010	3,376		10.4%
2020	3,152		−6.6%
U.S. Decennial Census

== School districts ==
- Jersey Community Unit School District 100
- Southwestern Community Unit School District 9

== Political districts ==
- Illinois' 19th congressional district
- State House District 97
- State Senate District 49
