= Middletown Historic District (Middletown, Delaware) =

Historic district in Delaware, US

- U.S. National Register of Historic Places
- U.S. Historic district
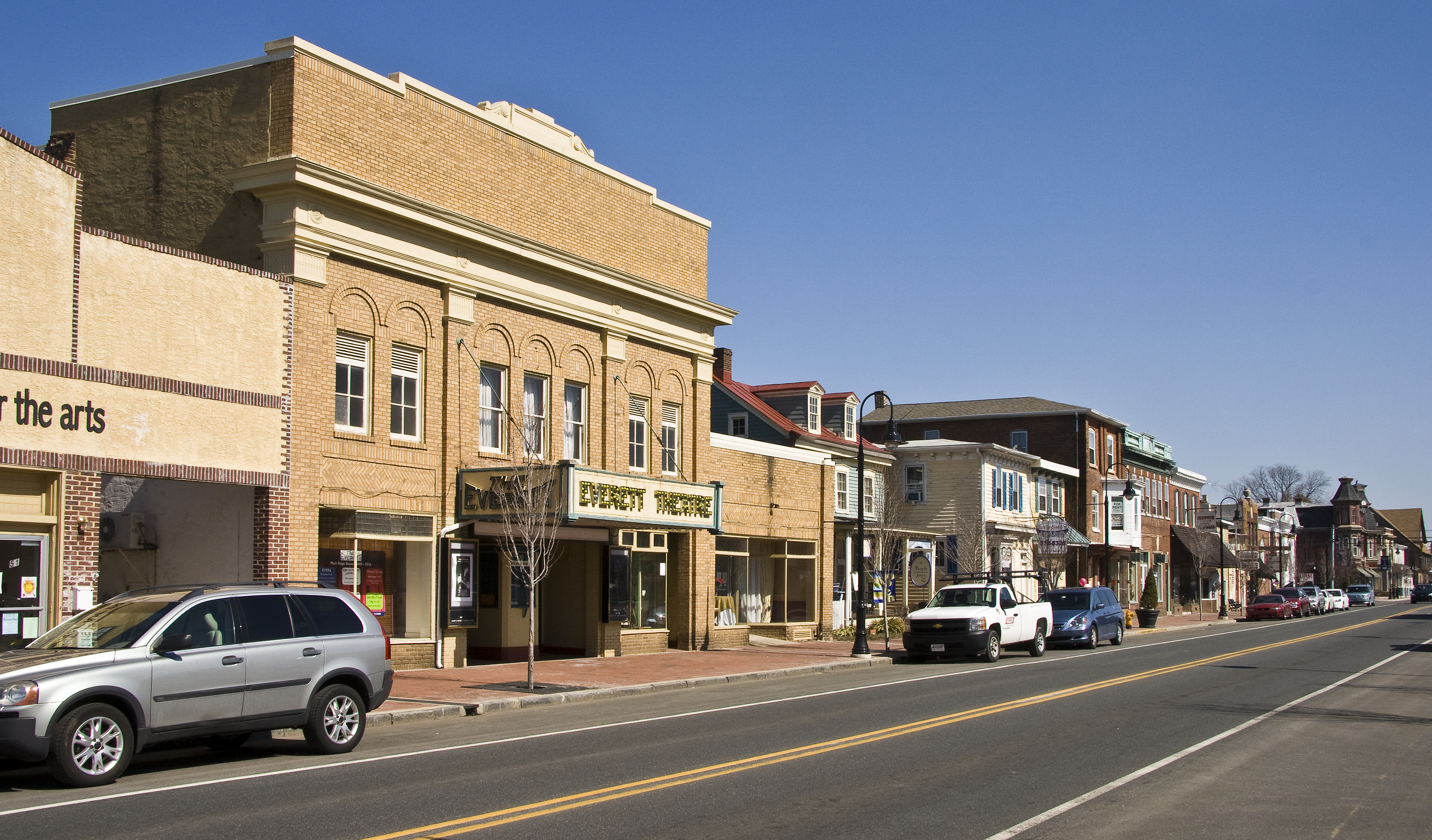
- Middletown Historic District, March 2010

- Location within Delaware Location within the United States
- Location: Roughly bounded by Redding, Scott, Lockwood, and Catherine Sts., Middletown, Delaware
- Coordinates: 39°26′59″N 75°43′00″W
- Area: 51 acres (21 ha)
- Built: 1855
- Architect: J.B. Fenemore (some roads and lots)
- Architectural style: Late Victorian, Federal, Eclectic
- NRHP reference No.: 78000896
- Added to NRHP: October 4, 1978

Middletown Historic District is a national historic district located at Middletown, Delaware, United States. It encompasses 187 contributing buildings in the central business district and surrounding residential areas of Middletown. It is centered on the Middletown crossroads established in the 17th century. Residential buildings include notable examples of the Late Victorian and Federal styles. Notable non-residential buildings include the Witherspoon Inn (1761), S. M. Reynolds and Company (1871), Delaware Trust Company (1918), People's National Bank (1884), and Forest Presbyterian Church (1851). Also located in the district is the separately listed Middletown Academy or Town Hall (1827).

It was listed on the National Register of Historic Places in 1978.
