= Salem Baptist Church (Alton, Illinois) =

Historic church in Illinois, United States

- U.S. National Register of Historic Places
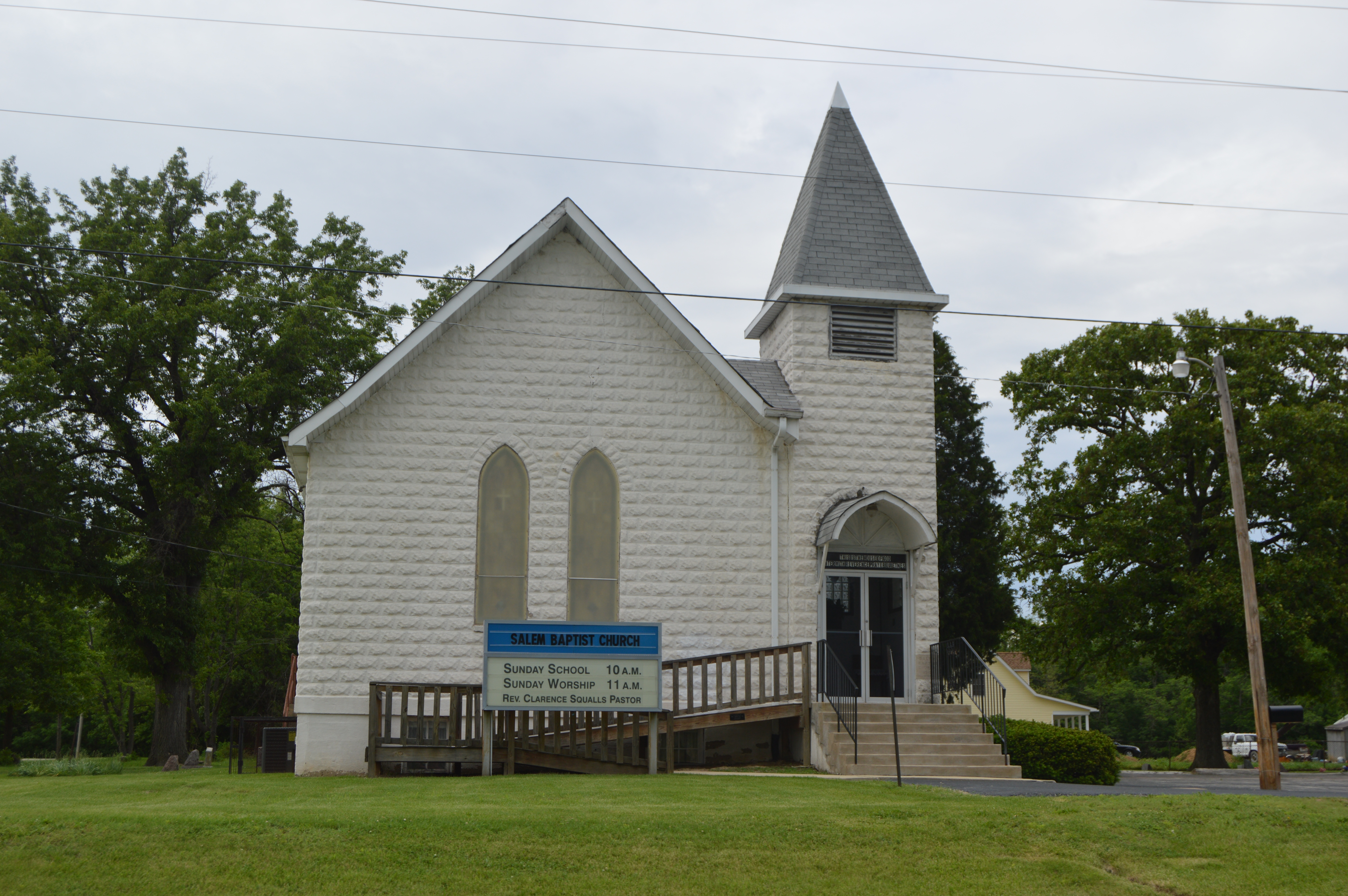
- Front of the church

- Location within Illinois Location within the United States
- Location: 2001 Seiler Rd., Foster Township, Madison County, Illinois
- Coordinates: 38°58′01″N 90°07′21″W
- Area: less than one acre
- Built: 1912
- Architectural style: Gothic Revival
- NRHP reference No.: 13001004
- Added to NRHP: December 31, 2013

The Salem Baptist Church is a historic African-American Baptist church located at 2001 Seiler Road in Foster Township, Madison County, Illinois. Built in 1912, the church was the third built for the Salem congregation, which formed in 1819. African-American stonemason Madison Banks and white contractor Samuel Marshall, both from Alton, built the church; they were assisted by two members of the congregation, John Walker and William Emery. The church served as a civic and social center for the local black community during the early 20th century, as African-Americans faced rampant segregation and discrimination in public spaces. The church hosted events such as picnics and dinners, hay rides, and fashion shows for its congregation. In addition, the congregation organized a Ladies Aid Society for its female members, which sponsored a college scholarship program, and a Progressive Club for its youth. The church's membership declined after the 1960s, a consequence of both integration and rural flight.

The church was added to the National Register of Historic Places on December 31, 2013.
