= Glen Carbon Village Hall and Firehouse =

- U.S. National Register of Historic Places
- Location within Illinois Location within the United States
- Location: 180 Summit Ave., Glen Carbon, Illinois
- Coordinates: 38°44′56″N 89°58′46″W
- Built: 1910
- Built by: Oswald Brothers
- Architectural style: Neoclassical
- NRHP reference No.: 100002326
- Added to NRHP: April 19, 2018

Glen Carbon Village Hall and Firehouse is a historic building at 180 Summit Avenue in Glen Carbon, Illinois. It was built in 1910 to serve as Glen Carbon's first village hall. The village was founded in 1892, and its government met in various businesses and public buildings until the village's growth necessitated a permanent building. The Oswald Brothers of nearby Alhambra built the Neoclassical building. The village government occupied the upper level of the building, while its fire department used the lower level. The village hall was the site of several contentious events in the 1910s; one village trustee won a tied election by pulling a number from a hat, and village president Hiram Slinger, Jr., had his nominees for village treasurer unanimously rejected by the trustees seventeen times. The village government moved to the former Glen Carbon Grade School in 1954, and the fire department moved to a new firehouse in 1981; the building is now used as meeting space by a model railroad club and a local Boy Scout troop.

The building was added to the National Register of Historic Places on April 19, 2018.
