= Brighton Township, Macoupin County, Illinois =

Brighton Township
- Township

- Location of Illinois in the United States
- Coordinates: 39°3′N 90°5′W
- Country: United States
- State: Illinois
- County: Macoupin
- Settled: November 1, 1870

Area
  - Total: 36.49 sq mi (94.5 km^{2})
  - Land: 36.09 sq mi (93.5 km^{2})
  - Water: 0.39 sq mi (1.0 km^{2}) 1.08%
- Elevation: 633 ft (193 m)

Population (2020)
  - Total: 3,896
  - Density: 108.0/sq mi (41.68/km^{2})
- Time zone: UTC-6 (CST)
  - Summer (DST): UTC-5 (CDT)
- FIPS code: 17-117-08277

Brighton Township (T7N R9W) is located in Macoupin County, Illinois, United States. As of the 2020 census, its population was 3,896 and it contained 1,653 housing units.

== Geography ==
According to the 2021 census gazetteer files, Brighton Township has a total area of 36.49 square miles (94.51 km^{2}), of which 36.09 square miles (93.47 km^{2}) (or 98.92%) is land and 0.39 square miles (1.01 km^{2}) (or 1.08%) is water.

== Demographics ==
As of the 2020 census there were 3,896 people, 1,466 households, and 1,116 families residing in the township. The population density was 106.78 inhabitants per square mile (41.23/km^{2}). There were 1,653 housing units at an average density of 45.30 per square mile (17.49/km^{2}). The racial makeup of the township was 94.66% White, 0.69% African American, 0.13% Native American, 0.18% Asian, 0.00% Pacific Islander, 0.23% from other races, and 4.11% from two or more races. Hispanic or Latino of any race were 0.98% of the population.

There were 1,466 households, out of which 32.70% had children under the age of 18 living with them, 62.82% were married couples living together, 9.21% had a female householder with no spouse present, and 23.87% were non-families. 19.40% of all households were made up of individuals, and 8.60% had someone living alone who was 65 years of age or older. The average household size was 2.58 and the average family size was 2.97.

According to the 2020 American Community Survey, township's age distribution consisted of 23.2% under the age of 18, 5.5% from 18 to 24, 26% from 25 to 44, 28.5% from 45 to 64, and 16.8% who were 65 years of age or older. The median age was 41.5 years. For every 100 females, there were 98.8 males. For every 100 females age 18 and over, there were 97.8 males.

The median income for a household in the township was $71,630, and the median income for a family was $82,031. Males had a median income of $51,300 versus $35,365 for females. The per capita income for the township was $35,003. About 9.0% of families and 9.4% of the population were below the poverty line, including 16.7% of those under age 18 and 8.9% of those age 65 or over.

Historical population
Census	Pop.	Note	%±
2000	4,149		—
2010	4,039		−2.7%
2020	3,896		−3.5%
U.S. Decennial Census

== Adjacent townships ==
- Shipman Township (north)
- Hillyard Township (northeast)
- Bunker Hill Township (east)
- Omphghent Township, Madison County (southeast)
- Foster Township, Madison County (south)
- Piasa Township, Jersey County (west)
- Fidelity Township, Jersey County (northwest)
