= McPike Mansion =

Historic house in Illinois, United States

- Mount Lookout
- U.S. National Register of Historic Places
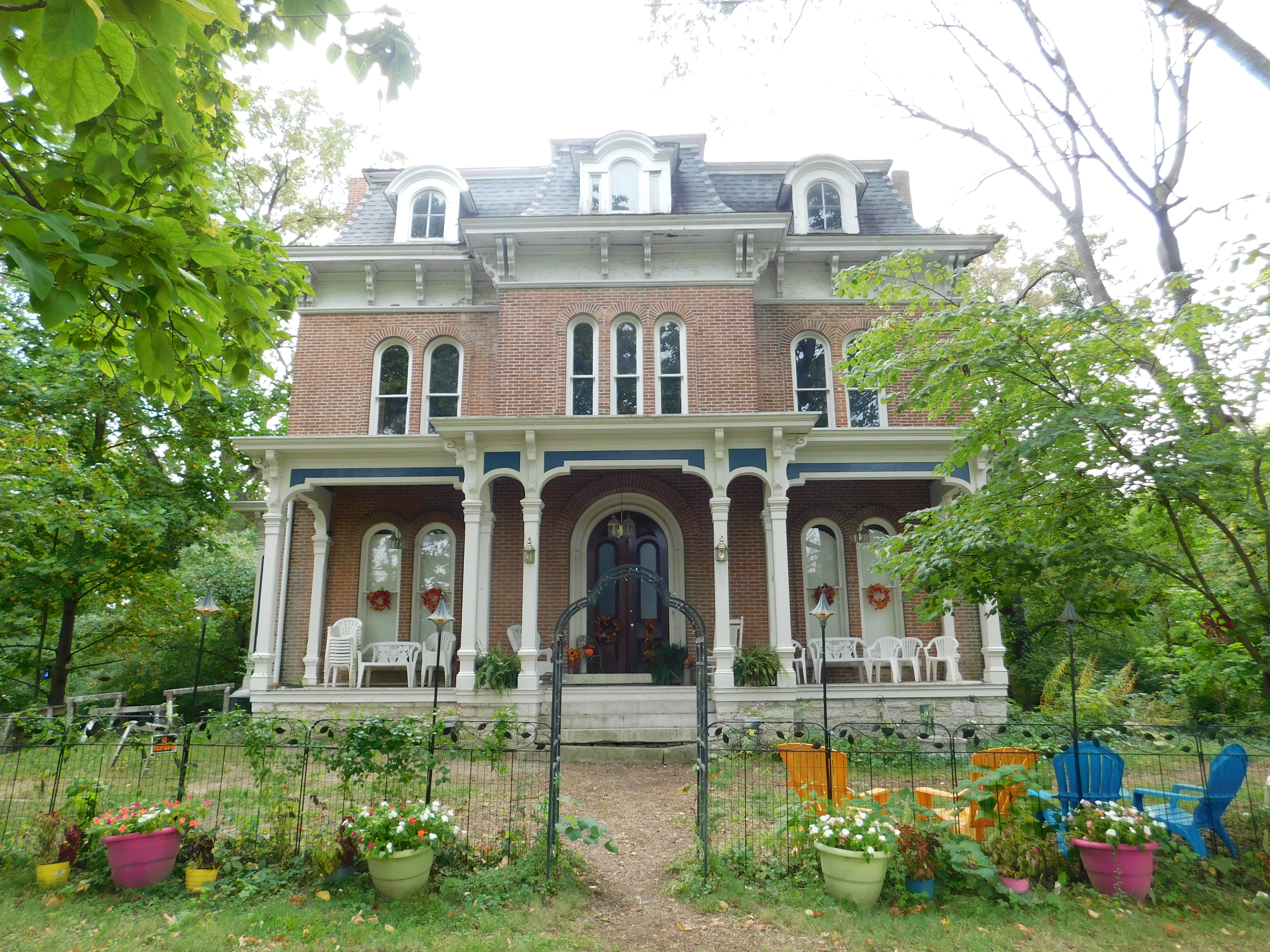

- Location within Illinois Location within the United States
- Interactive map showing the location of McPike Mansion
- Location: 2018 Alby Street, Alton, Illinois, United States
- Coordinates: 38°54′21″N 90°11′0″W
- Built: 1869
- Architect: Lucas Pfeiffenberger
- Architectural style: Italianate, Second Empire
- NRHP reference No.: 80001389
- Added to NRHP: June 17, 1980

McPike Mansion, or Mount Lookout, is a mansion in Alton, which is part of the Metro-East region of the Greater St. Louis metropolitan area in the U.S. state of Illinois. Built in 1869 by Henry Guest McPike (1825–1910), it is situated on Alby Street on a site of 15 acres (61,000 m^{2}), one of the highest points in Alton, which was called Mount Lookout.

== History ==
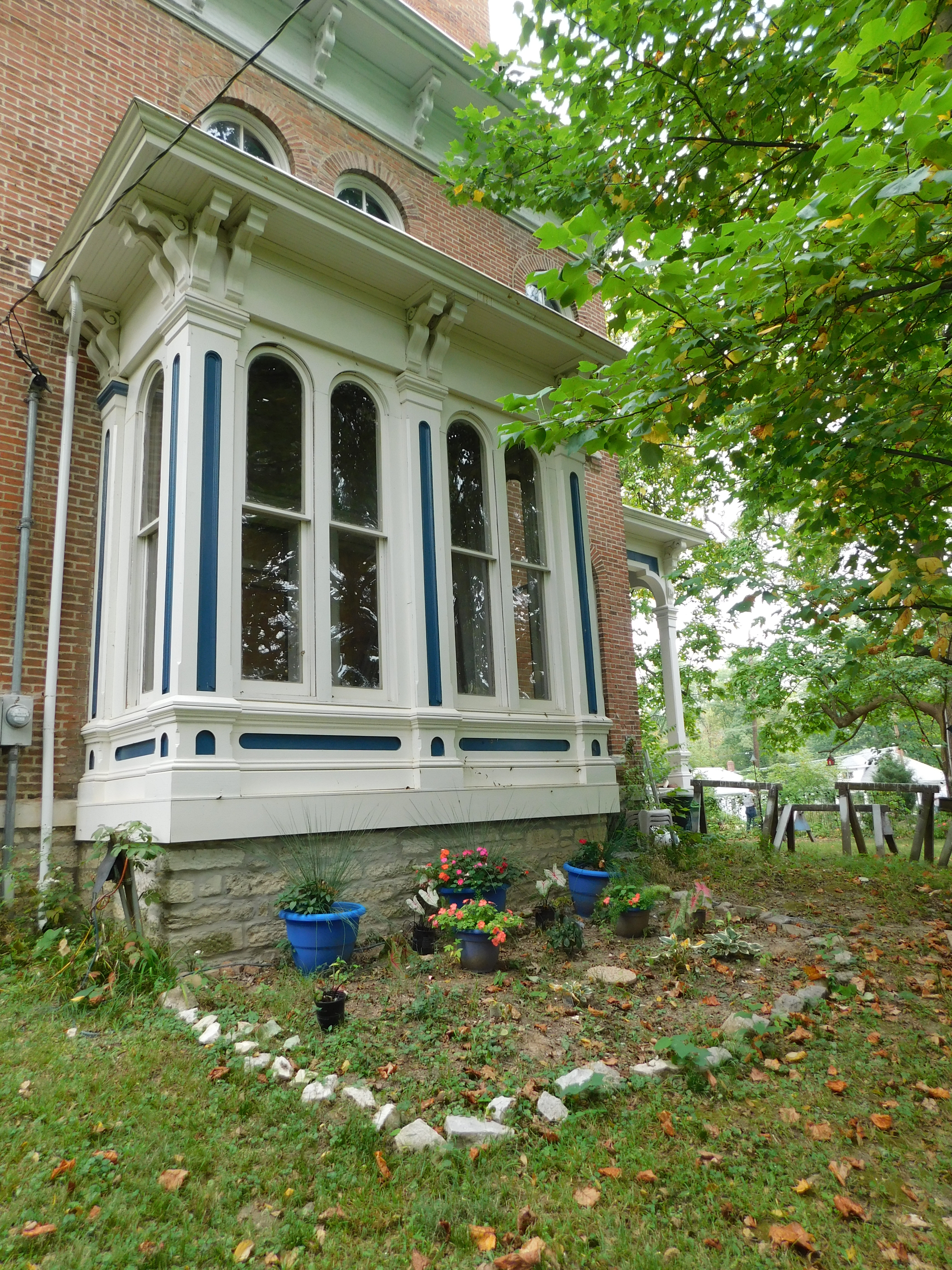
Restored conservatory in 2017

Construction began in 1869 by the architect Lucas Pfeiffenberger. In that year, McPike's Rulander was considered one of the finest in quality at an exhibition of the Mississippi Valley Grape Growers' Association, while his Diana grapes were best on exhibition. McPike served as mayor of Alton and was a notable local businessman, involved in real estate and box making. He also served as the Librarian of the Alton-Southern Illinois Horticultural Society in the late 1880s. He died in 1910.

In 1925 or 1936, the mansion was purchased by Paul A. Laichinger, who rented rooms out to others and lived there until his death in 1945 or 1951. While the house was abandoned for years thereafter, there was some interest in demolishing it and converting the land into a shopping center, though this fell through due to zoning issues. In the meantime, the house was ransacked for what was left behind, including its furnishings, wooden banisters and even the toilets, becoming a victim of vandalism and negligence.

The structure was listed on the National Register of Historic Places on June 17, 1980, but was left derelict for many years, before being purchased by Sharyn and George Luedke in an auction in 1994. They had intended to convert it into a hotel, but contrary to earlier assurances at auction, they were unable to secure restoration grant money from any federal, state, or local agencies. Despite this, the Luedkes have overseen a restoration process, funded through donations and tours. In 2017, the Alton Historical Commission presented them with an award in preservation for work done on the front porch and conservatory.

=== Haunting ===
According to the owner, the mansion is allegedly haunted by the ghost of a former owner and a former domestic servant. It frequently is a part of the area's many haunted tours.

== Architecture and grounds ==
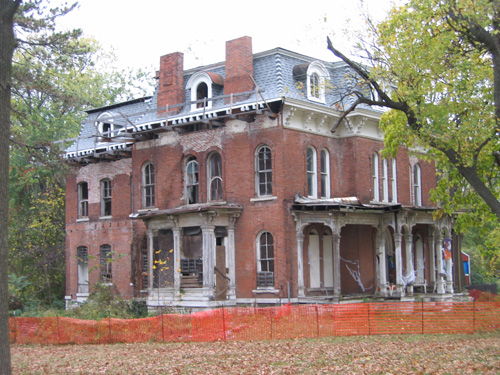
The mansion in 2003

The mansion was completed in 1871. It is a three-story red brick and white building, with white pillars supporting the porch. It contains 16 rooms and a vaulted wine cellar.

Situated on Alby Street on a site of 15 acres (61,000 m^{2}), one of the highest points in Alton, McPike named the estate Mount Lookout. McPike was an avid horticulturalist and added extensive gardens with orchards, shrubs and rare trees. Only 4.4 acres (18,000 m^{2}) of the original estate remain of Mt. Lookout.

== In the media ==
=== Television ===
McPike Mansion was featured on an episode of Ghost Adventures entitled "McPike Mansion" that aired as a special in 2019 on the Travel Channel. The team of paranormal investigators explored the home and its property, which is said to be haunted by its former inhabitants. The structure also appeared in the series Scariest Places on Earth. It was also featured on Season 1, Episode 7 of Fact or Faked: Paranormal Files, and an episode of Ghost Lab.

== See also ==
- List of museums in Illinois
- National Register of Historic Places listings in Madison County, Illinois
