= Madison Hotel =

Madison Hotel may refer to:

- Madison Hotel and Cafe, West Yellowstone, Montana, listed on the National Register of Historic Places (NRHP) in Gallatin County
- Madison Hotel (Atlantic City, New Jersey), NRHP-listed in Atlantic County
- Madison Hotel (Memphis, Tennessee), NRHP-listed
- Loews Madison Hotel, Washington, D.C., formerly "The Madison Hotel"
- Madison Hotel, one of brands of H World Group Limited

== See also ==
- Madison House (disambiguation)
- Hotel Manger, former hotel in Boston, Massachusetts, also known as "Hotel Madison"
