= Brighton, Illinois =

- Village
- Location in Macoupin and Jersey counties, Illinois
- Coordinates: 39°02′27″N 90°07′55″W
- Country: United States
- State: Illinois
- Counties: Macoupin, Jersey
- Townships: Brighton, Piasa

Government
  - Type: Mayor-Council

Area
  - Total: 1.96 sq mi (5.08 km^{2})
  - Land: 1.92 sq mi (4.98 km^{2})
  - Water: 0.039 sq mi (0.10 km^{2})
- Elevation: 663 ft (202 m)

Population (2020)
  - Total: 2,221
  - Density: 1,156.0/sq mi (446.33/km^{2})
- Time zone: UTC−6 (CST)
  - Summer (DST): UTC−5 (CDT)
- ZIP Code: 62012
- Area code: 618
- FIPS code: 17-08264
- GNIS feature ID: 2397454
- Website: www.brightonil.com

Brighton is a village located mostly in Macoupin County and partially in Jersey County, Illinois, United States. As of the 2020 census, the village had a population of 2,221.

== History ==
Brighton is a small community that dates back to the early 19th century, when settlers began the transformation of the Illinois prairie into productive farmland. The village was named after Brighton, Massachusetts. A post office was opened in 1837, and the village was incorporated in 1869. Brighton is noted for its local heritage museum.

Brighton currently has two restaurants and one traffic signal.

== Geography ==
Brighton is located in southwestern Macoupin County and eastern Jersey County. The village center and most of its area are within Macoupin County. Some rural residents of Madison County have Brighton mailing addresses.

Illinois Routes 111 and 267 pass jointly through the west side of the village, leading north 9 miles (14 km) to Medora and south 6 miles (10 km) to Godfrey. Carlinville, the Macoupin county seat, is 26 miles (42 km) to the northeast, while Jerseyville, the Jersey county seat, is 13 miles (21 km) to the northwest.

According to the 2021 census gazetteer files, Brighton has a total area of 1.96 square miles (5.08 km^{2}), of which 1.92 square miles (4.97 km^{2}) (or 98.01%) is land and 0.04 square miles (0.10 km^{2}) (or 1.99%) is water.

== Demographics ==
Historical population
Census	Pop.	Note	%±
1880	691		—
1890	742		7.4%
1900	660		−11.1%
1910	595		−9.8%
1920	586		−1.5%
1930	548		−6.5%
1940	697		27.2%
1950	934		34.0%
1960	1,248		33.6%
1970	1,889		51.4%
1980	2,364		25.1%
1990	2,270		−4.0%
2000	2,196		−3.3%
2010	2,254		2.6%
2020	2,221		−1.5%
U.S. Decennial Census

Brighton is a part of the Metro East region of the St. Louis Metropolitan Statistical Area.

=== 2020 census ===
As of the 2020 census, Brighton had a population of 2,221. The median age was 40.5 years. 22.2% of residents were under the age of 18 and 19.9% of residents were 65 years of age or older. For every 100 females there were 95.0 males, and for every 100 females age 18 and over there were 92.5 males age 18 and over.

0.0% of residents lived in urban areas, while 100.0% lived in rural areas.

There were 868 households in Brighton and 606 families residing in the village. Of all households, 33.2% had children under the age of 18 living in them, 52.6% were married-couple households, 16.9% were households with a male householder and no spouse or partner present, and 25.0% were households with a female householder and no spouse or partner present. About 24.3% of all households were made up of individuals and 12.0% had someone living alone who was 65 years of age or older.

The population density was 1,133.16 inhabitants per square mile (437.52/km^{2}), and there were 927 housing units at an average density of 472.96 per square mile (182.61/km^{2}). Of the housing units, 6.4% were vacant. The homeowner vacancy rate was 1.8% and the rental vacancy rate was 2.7%.

Racial composition as of the 2020 census
Race	Number	Percent
White	2,094	94.3%
Black or African American	17	0.8%
American Indian and Alaska Native	3	0.1%
Asian	7	0.3%
Native Hawaiian and Other Pacific Islander	0	0.0%
Some other race	5	0.2%
Two or more races	95	4.3%
Hispanic or Latino (of any race)	30	1.4%

=== Income and poverty ===
The median income for a household in the village was $61,167, and the median income for a family was $66,827. Males had a median income of $42,734 versus $29,063 for females. The per capita income for the village was $26,345. About 15.0% of families and 13.9% of the population were below the poverty line, including 24.2% of those under age 18 and 6.9% of those age 65 or over.

== Government ==
The village's current mayor is Matthew P. Kasten.

== Notable people ==
- Joe Bernard, pitcher for the St. Louis Cardinals
- Jason Isringhausen, pitcher for the New York Mets, St. Louis Cardinals, and Tampa Bay Rays
- Bushrod Johnson, Confederate general in the American Civil War

== In popular culture ==
- Martha A. Bentley, There the Heart Is: A History of Brighton, Illinois, 1826–1964, was reprinted in 1995.
- The opening scene of The Music Man (1962) is set in Brighton, purported to be one stop from River City, Iowa.
- Although the state is never explicitly said, a map within the show suggests that The Ghost and Molly McGee, a 2021 Disney Channel show, is set in this version of Brighton. Series co-creator Bill Motz revealed that the quad cities in the area of Illinois and Iowa were the inspiration for the show's setting.
