= Helena M. Weiss =

American museum administrator

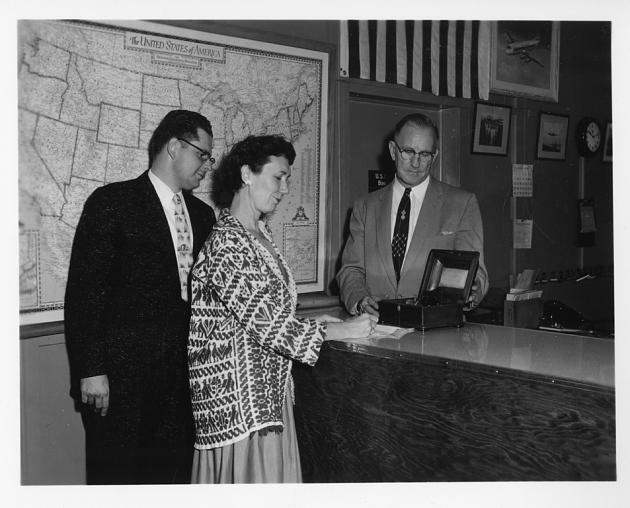
- Helena Weiss, George B. Griffenhagen and Bane, 1956. Weiss is signing the acquisition paperwork for one of the first x-ray tubes created by Wilhelm Konrad Roentgen
- Born: Helena May Weiss; February 6, 1909; Shipman, Illinois
- Died: January 21, 2004 (aged 94); Washington, D.C.
- Occupation: Museum administrator/ registrar
- Parent(s): Gerald Bisset Weiss, Mary Julia Henrietta Brueggemann

Helena May Weiss (February 6, 1909 – January 21, 2004) was an American museum administrator and registrar. She was one of the first women managers at the Smithsonian Institution and was involved in the acquisition of the Hope Diamond and the Wright Flyer.

== Personal life and education ==
Helena May Weiss was born in 1909 into a German-American family and raised in Shipman, Illinois, the daughter of postal worker Gerald Bisset Weiss and his first wife, Mary Julia Henrietta Brueggemann (1881-1915). Her grandfather Henry Maurice Henwick Weiss (1828–1915) was born in County Cork, Ireland, to a father born in England and an Irish mother. He married in 1850 in Grangegorman, when his was listed occupation was listed as "gentleman" but reinvented himself as a farmer in Illinois, where in 1858 he married secondly Eliza Travers, born in England to Irish parents. After he emigrated from Ireland, Henry M. H. Weiss fought with the 27th Illinois Infantry Regiment in the Civil War as a Lieutenant 2nd Class, recognized for Distinguished Service.

Helena May Weiss's maternal grandparents, the Brüggemanns, were German emigrants. After her mother died in 1915, Gerald Weiess remarried a German emigrant, Freda Brüggemann, apparently his wife's widowed sister-in-law, who helped raise Helena. Weiss graduated from Butter Business College in Butler, Pennsylvania and Wheeler Business College in Birmingham, Alabama. Weiss was an active member of the New York Avenue Presbyterian Church, serving as elder, diaconal minister, and on a women's committee. When she died in 2004, she left the church $515,000.

== Professional life ==
Weiss' first job, in 1930, was as a stenographer for the Veterans Administration. The following year she became the Junior Clerk-Stenographer for the Office of Correspondence and Records at the United States National Museum. In 1935 she moved to the geology department where she worked as secretary to Ray S. Bassler. She moved back to the Office of Correspondence and Records in 1948 as an administrative assistant. On occasion she stood in for Smithsonian secretary Alexander Wetmore's administrative assistant. In 1956 she replaced Herbert S. Bryant as head of the department, serving as registrar. As registrar, she maintained the museums central filing system, handled public inquiries, oversaw the mail system, and other standard registrar tasks. Weiss processed more than 250,000 letters a year from the public.

=== Acquisitions ===
Weiss was involved in the acquisition of the Wright Flyer, the Hope Diamond, and other major Smithsonian pieces. She retired from that position in 1971. In 1956 she helped acquire one of the first x-ray tubes used by Wilhelm Röntgen.
