= Historic Saint Louis Street Association =

American non-profit organization

Incorporated in 1999, the Historic Saint Louis Street Association (HSSA) is a non-profit organization. The mission of which is to protect and preserve Historic Saint Louis Street and its community. Located in Edwardsville, Illinois, Historic Saint Louis Street was placed on the National Register of Historic Places in 1983. Saint Louis Street is a mile long National Historic District, which dates back to 1809. It is a residential street with over 50 historic homes from the middle 18th Century to early 19th Century.

The association has a governing board of seven members. Board members are elected for staggered two year terms by the members of the association. Membership in the association is voluntary. The current 2022-2023 board members are: Dave Kilby, Dan Lytle, Austin Willis, Craig Becker, Kris Lakin, Greg Gordon and Ted Gayford.

12 association meetings are held per year. The annual meeting is the second Tuesday of May. All other meetings are held on the first Monday of each month.

HSSA has a wide range of committees. These committees include: The Traffic Committee, Website Committee, Social Committee, Membership Committee, Welcoming Committee, Newsletter Committee, Adopt a Highway Committee, and the Beautification Committee. Committee membership is open to any HSSA member that is in good standing.
