= Bunker Hill Township, Macoupin County, Illinois =

Bunker Hill Township
- Township

- Location of Illinois in the United States
- Coordinates: 39°3′N 89°59′W
- Country: United States
- State: Illinois
- County: Macoupin
- Settled: November 1, 1870

Area
  - Total: 36.42 sq mi (94.3 km^{2})
  - Land: 36.20 sq mi (93.8 km^{2})
  - Water: 0.22 sq mi (0.57 km^{2}) 0.60%
- Elevation: 617 ft (188 m)

Population (2020)
  - Total: 3,148
  - Density: 86.96/sq mi (33.58/km^{2})
- Time zone: UTC-6 (CST)
  - Summer (DST): UTC-5 (CDT)
- FIPS code: 17-117-09590

Bunker Hill Township (T7N R8W) is located in Macoupin County, Illinois, United States. As of the 2020 census, its population is 3,148 and it contains 1,385 housing units.

== Geography ==
According to the 2021 census gazetteer files, Bunker Hill Township has a total area of 36.42 square miles (94.33 km^{2}), of which 36.20 square miles (93.76 km^{2}) (or 99.40%) is land and 0.22 square miles (0.57 km^{2}) (or 0.60%) is water.

== Demographics ==
As of the 2020 census there were 3,148 people, 1,193 households, and 855 families residing in the township. The population density was 86.43 inhabitants per square mile (33.37/km^{2}). There were 1,385 housing units at an average density of 38.03 per square mile (14.68/km^{2}). The racial makeup of the township was 91.17% White, 0.67% African American, 0.19% Native American, 0.51% Asian, 0.00% Pacific Islander, 0.25% from other races, and 7.21% from two or more races. Hispanic or Latino of any race were 1.87% of the population.

There were 1,193 households, out of which 30.90% had children under the age of 18 living with them, 51.97% were married couples living together, 13.24% had a female householder with no spouse present, and 28.33% were non-families. 22.30% of all households were made up of individuals, and 12.00% had someone living alone who was 65 years of age or older. The average household size was 2.64 and the average family size was 3.04.

According to the 2020 American Community Survey, township's age distribution consisted of 21.8% under the age of 18, 8.1% from 18 to 24, 24.9% from 25 to 44, 31.8% from 45 to 64, and 13.4% who were 65 years of age or older. The median age was 39.9 years. For every 100 females, there were 101.9 males. For every 100 females age 18 and over, there were 95.9 males.

The median income for a household in the township was $61,367, and the median income for a family was $72,468. Males had a median income of $45,962 versus $25,230 for females. The per capita income for the township was $25,200. About 8.1% of families and 12.1% of the population were below the poverty line, including 15.6% of those under age 18 and 8.0% of those age 65 or over.

Historical population
Census	Pop.	Note	%±
2000	3,352		—
2010	3,346		−0.2%
2020	3,148		−5.9%
U.S. Decennial Census

== Adjacent townships ==
- Hillyard Township (north)
- Gillespie Township (northeast)
- Dorchester Township (east)
- Omphghent Township, Madison County (southeast)
- Moro Township, Madison County (south)
- Brighton Township (west)
- Shipman Township (northwest)
