= Yakel House and Union Brewery =

Historic buildings in Illinois, United States

- U.S. National Register of Historic Places
- U.S. Historic district
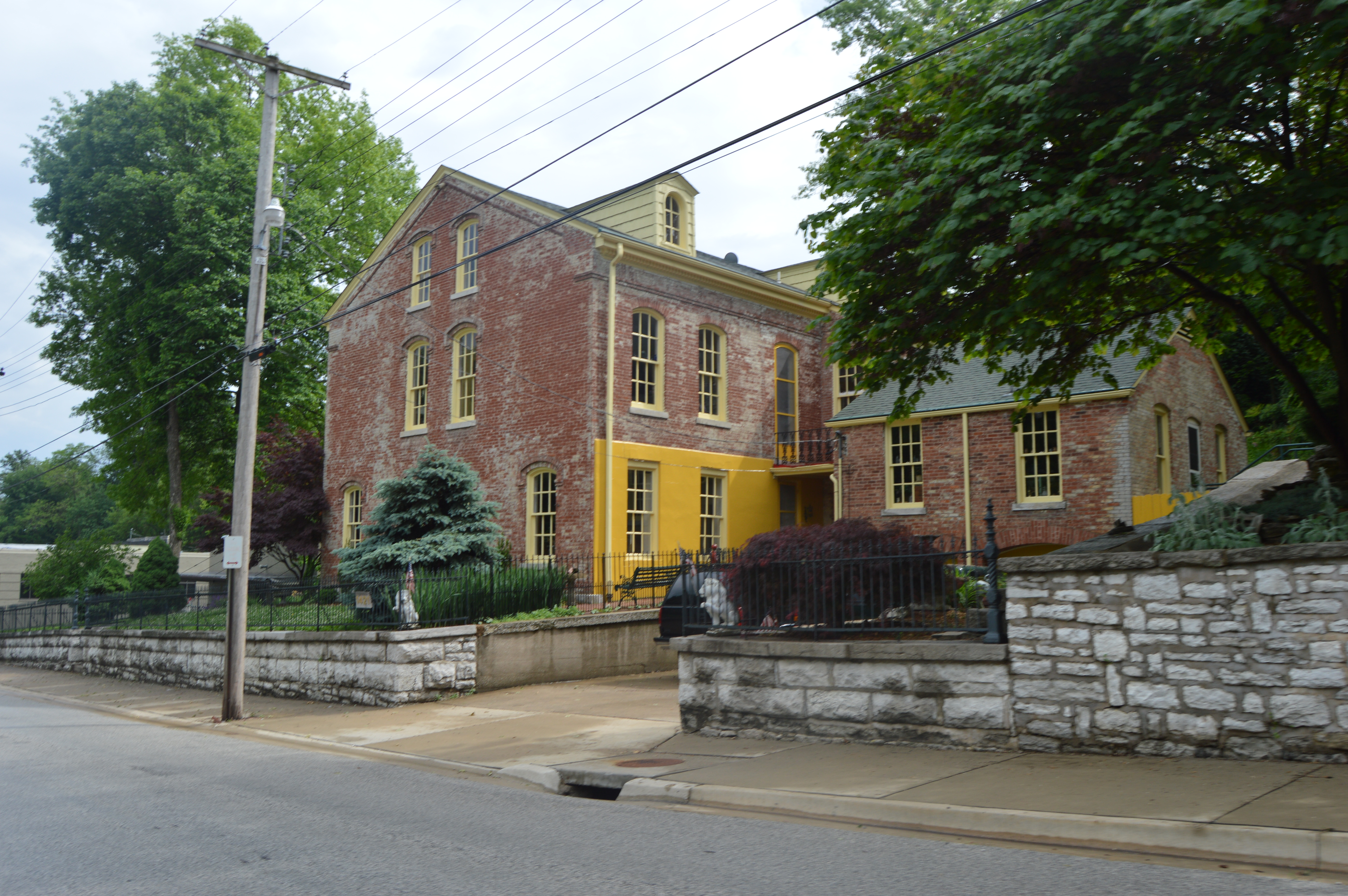
- Part of the complex

- Location within Illinois Location within the United States
- Location: 1421-1431 Pearl St., Alton, Illinois
- Coordinates: 38°53′33″N 90°9′52″W
- Area: 4.8 acres (1.9 ha)
- NRHP reference No.: 82002585
- Added to NRHP: May 11, 1982

The Yakel House and Union Brewery are a historic house and brewery complex located at 1421-1431 Pearl St. in Alton, Illinois. Philip Yakel, a German immigrant, built the brewery soon after coming to America in 1836. The brewery was the first in Alton and one of the city's earliest successful industries. Yakel's son George, who eventually ran the brewery alongside his father, built the house in 1863; it was the family's second home at the site. The brick home features a vernacular design influenced by German architectural tradition. William Netzhammer, a brewer from St. Louis, purchased the brewery in 1882. The Netzhammer family ran the brewery until it closed in 1952;, notably, the brewery continued production during Prohibition by making near beer.

The complex was added to the National Register of Historic Places on May 11, 1982.
