= Guertler House =

Historic house in Illinois, United States

- U.S. National Register of Historic Places
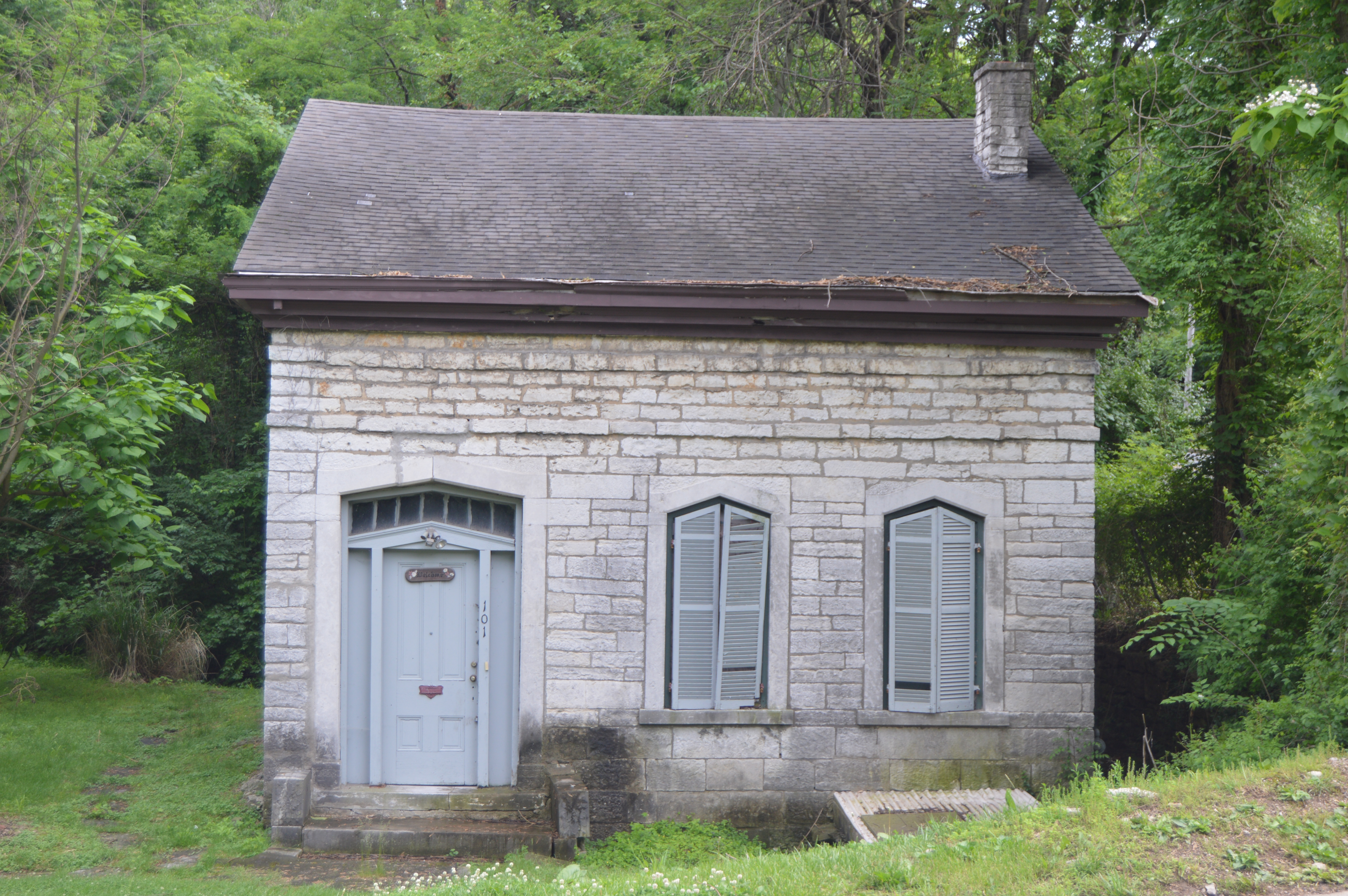
- Front of the house

- Location within Illinois Location within the United States
- Location: 101 Blair St., Alton, Illinois
- Coordinates: 38°54′3″N 90°10′57″W
- Area: 1.2 acres (0.49 ha)
- Built: 1854
- Built by: Bruch, Ignaz
- Architectural style: Federal
- NRHP reference No.: 74000767
- Added to NRHP: July 30, 1974

The Guertler House is a historic house located at 101 Blair St. in Alton, Illinois. Stonemason Ignaz Bruch built the house in 1854. Bruch, who immigrated to the United States from Germany in 1846, was a prominent Illinois stonemason who constructed buildings in cities ranging from Chicago to St. Louis, Missouri. The Guertler House is a Federal building with three bays. The front door and windows have a pointed arch design, while the second story of the house's west side has a single Gothic arch window.

The house was added to the National Register of Historic Places on July 30, 1974.
