= Collinsville Masonic Temple =

- Collinsville Masonic Temple Lodge #712 A.F. & A.M.
- U.S. National Register of Historic Places
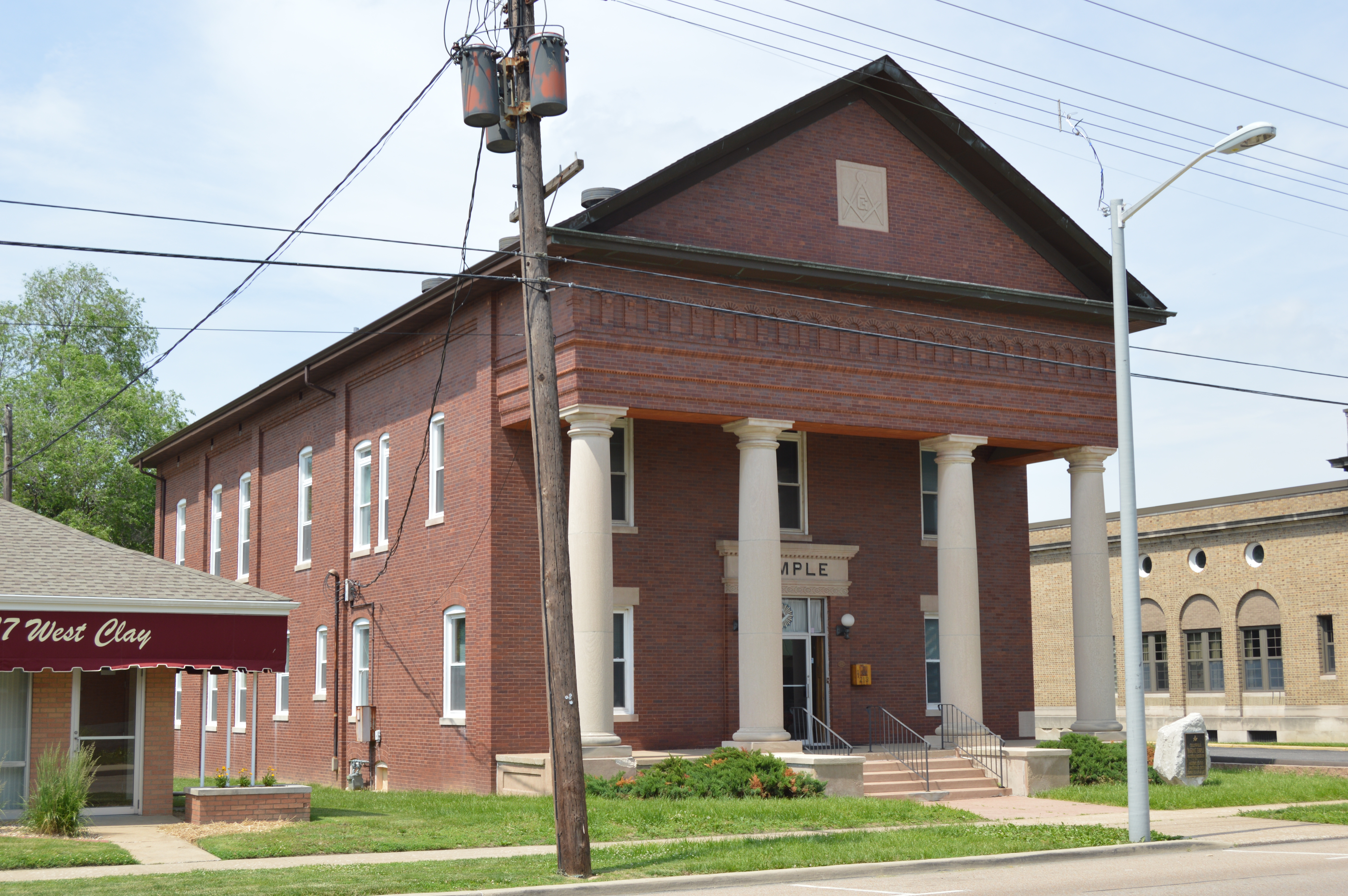
- Western side and front

- Location within Illinois Location within the United States
- Location: 213 W. Clay St., Collinsville, Illinois
- Coordinates: 38°40′20″N 89°59′21″W
- Area: less than one acre
- Built: 1912
- Architect: Kennedy, J.W.
- Architectural style: Masonic lodge
- NRHP reference No.: 05000430
- Added to NRHP: May 22, 2005

The Collinsville Masonic Temple is a historic Masonic building located in Collinsville, Illinois. It houses Collinsville Lodge No. 712, A.F. & A.M, which was established in 1872 as the city's chapter of the Freemasons. The building was constructed in 1912; prior to then, the Masons had met in rented buildings. The Classical Revival building's front facade features a brick entablature and pediment supported by four two-story Doric columns. The Masonic Temple is the oldest fraternal meeting house in Collinsville which is still used by the organization which built it.

The building was listed on the National Register of Historic Places in 2005.
