= Collinsville City Hall and Fire Station =

- U.S. National Register of Historic Places
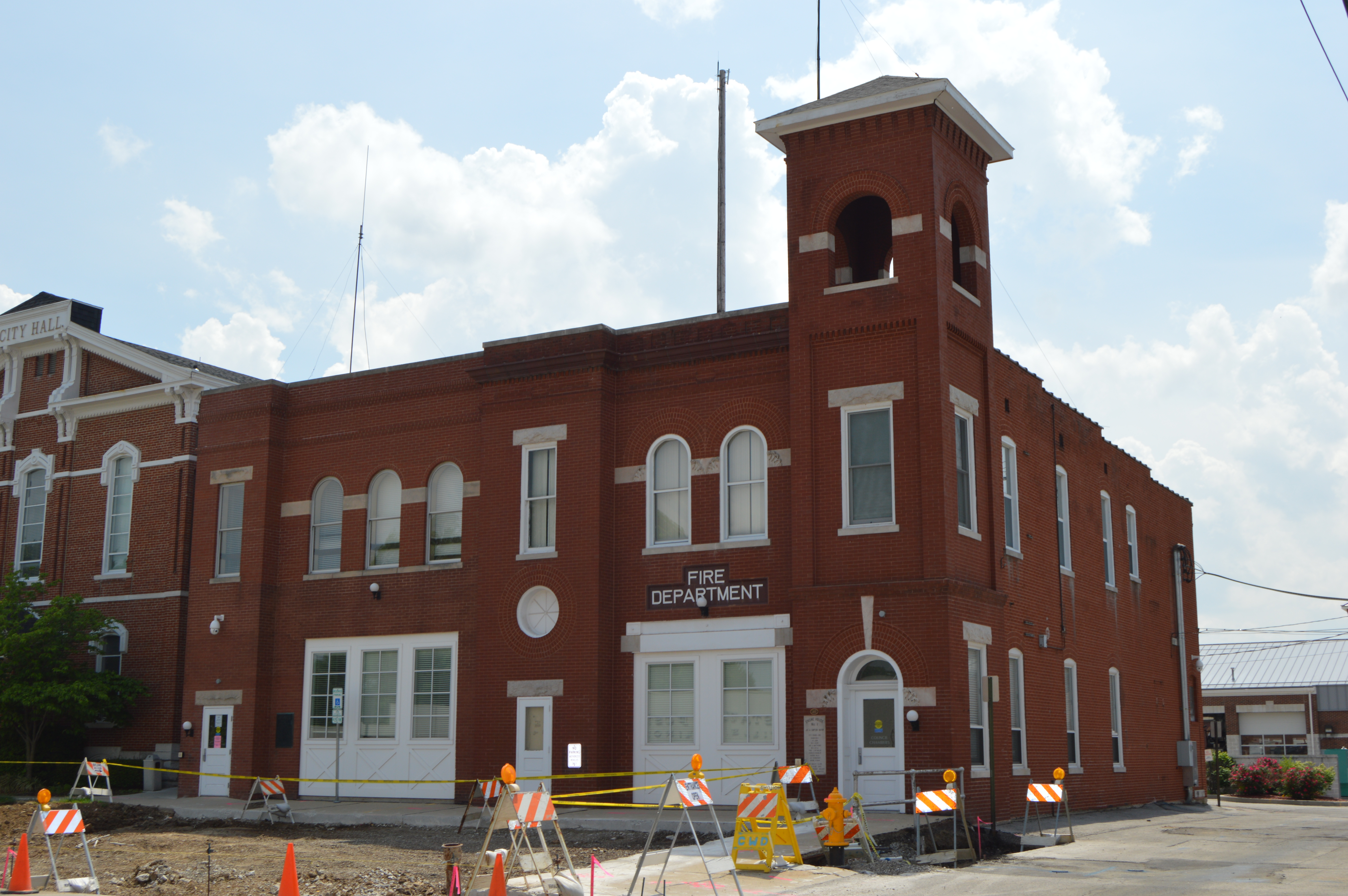
- Fire station section, with the city hall to far left

- Location within Illinois Location within the United States
- Location: 125 S. Center St., Collinsville, Illinois
- Coordinates: 38°40′16″N 89°59′11″W
- Area: less than one acre
- Built: 1885, 1910
- Architectural style: Italianate, Romanesque Revival
- NRHP reference No.: 04000865
- Added to NRHP: August 20, 2004

The Collinsville City Hall and Fire Station are two connected buildings located at 125 Center St. in Collinsville, Illinois. The Italianate City Hall was built in 1885. It was Collinsville's first dedicated city hall; prior to its completion, government meetings were held at the mayor's house. The new city hall, along with several other public works projects, created a large debt which contributed to mayor Charles L. Oatman's defeat in the next election. The Romanesque Revival fire station was built next to City Hall in 1910. Additions in 1972 and 1994 connected the two buildings. A Civil War monument on the southeast corner the property was dedicated in 1926; while it was originally located between the two buildings, it moved to its current location when the fire station expanded in 1956.

The buildings were added to the National Register of Historic Places on August 20, 2004.
