= Shipman Township, Macoupin County, Illinois =

Shipman Township
- Township

- Location of Illinois in the United States
- Coordinates: 39°8′N 90°6′W
- Country: United States
- State: Illinois
- County: Macoupin
- Settled: November 1, 1870

Area
  - Total: 35.92 sq mi (93.0 km^{2})
  - Land: 35.81 sq mi (92.7 km^{2})
  - Water: 0.12 sq mi (0.31 km^{2}) 0.33%
- Elevation: 614 ft (187 m)

Population (2020)
  - Total: 1,278
  - Density: 35.69/sq mi (13.78/km^{2})
- Time zone: UTC-6 (CST)
  - Summer (DST): UTC-5 (CDT)
- FIPS code: 17-117-69576

Shipman Township (T8N R9W) is located in Macoupin County, Illinois, United States. As of the 2020 census, its population was 1,278 and it contained 565 housing units.

== Geography ==
According to the 2021 census gazetteer files, Shipman Township has a total area of 35.92 square miles (93.03 km^{2}), of which 35.81 square miles (92.75 km^{2}) (or 99.67%) is land and 0.12 square miles (0.31 km^{2}) (or 0.33%) is water.

== Demographics ==
As of the 2020 census there were 1,278 people, 514 households, and 369 families residing in the township. The population density was 35.58 inhabitants per square mile (13.74/km^{2}). There were 565 housing units at an average density of 15.73 per square mile (6.07/km^{2}). The racial makeup of the township was 94.29% White, 0.23% African American, 0.16% Native American, 0.00% Asian, 0.00% Pacific Islander, 0.47% from other races, and 4.85% from two or more races. Hispanic or Latino of any race were 0.78% of the population.

There were 514 households, out of which 28.80% had children under the age of 18 living with them, 58.75% were married couples living together, 7.98% had a female householder with no spouse present, and 28.21% were non-families. 23.00% of all households were made up of individuals, and 10.10% had someone living alone who was 65 years of age or older. The average household size was 2.35 and the average family size was 2.74.

According to the 2020 American Community Survey, township's age distribution consisted of 22.3% under the age of 18, 5.0% from 18 to 24, 20.3% from 25 to 44, 32.4% from 45 to 64, and 20.1% who were 65 years of age or older. The median age was 47.6 years. For every 100 females, there were 97.5 males. For every 100 females age 18 and over, there were 100.4 males.

The median income for a household in the township was $56,333, and the median income for a family was $64,453. Males had a median income of $39,000 versus $28,750 for females. The per capita income for the township was $27,601. About 7.0% of families and 9.1% of the population were below the poverty line, including 7.4% of those under age 18 and 8.6% of those age 65 or over.

Historical population
Census	Pop.	Note	%±
2000	1,507		—
2010	1,433		−4.9%
2020	1,278		−10.8%
U.S. Decennial Census

== Adjacent townships ==
- Chesterfield Township (north)
- Polk Township (northeast)
- Hillyard Township (east)
- Bunker Hill Township (southeast)
- Brighton Township (south)
- Piasa Township, Jersey County (southwest)
- Fidelity Township, Jersey County (west)
- Ruyle Township, Jersey County (northwest)
