= Middletown Academy =

Historic building in Delaware, US

- U.S. National Register of Historic Places
- U.S. Historic district – Contributing property
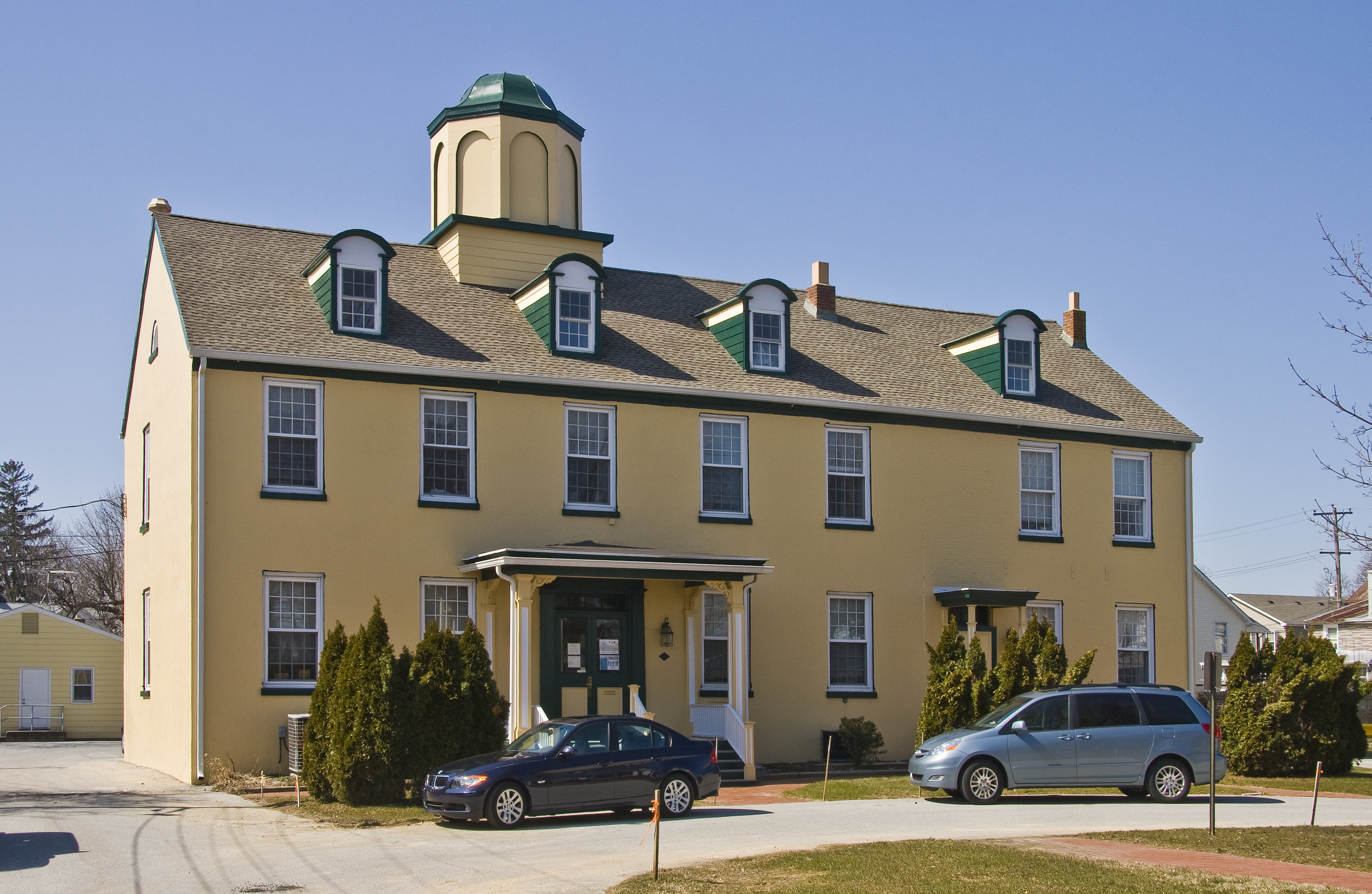
- Middletown Academy building in 2010

- Location within Delaware Location within the United States
- Location: 218 N. Broad St., Middletown, Delaware
- Coordinates: 39°27′5″N 75°43′4″W
- Area: 1 acre (0.40 ha)
- Built: 1827
- NRHP reference No.: 72000284
- Added to NRHP: December 5, 1972

The Middletown Academy is a historic building located in Middletown, Delaware, United States, that formerly housed a school of the same name. Founded in 1826 through lottery subscription and constructed the following year, it became part of the public school system in 1876 and was closed in 1929. The school building survives and was listed on the National Register of Historic Places on December 5, 1972. It presently houses the town historical society and chamber of commerce.

== Construction ==
The school building was constructed in two phases. The original building was a five bay, two and half story structure topped with an octagonal belfry (since converted into a closed cupola). The exterior walls are brick covered in stucco, the result of a trip to Philadelphia by a trustee sent to investigate the possibility. An annex was constructed around 1872, also of brick but painted rather than stuccoed. Both the annex and the original portion feature round-headed dormers to light the attic. There are three rooms on each floor and a central hall in the original section. This layout remains unchanged though the interior has been updated considerably over the years to accommodate the various tenants.

== History ==
The academy had its genesis in an 1824 petition by a group of local farmers and merchants to the general assembly, asking that they be allowed to hold a lottery to construct a building for "an academy and elementary school, and also a room for public worship." The petition was granted to allow $6000 to be raised; this was amended the following year to $10,000. The lottery was sold in May 1825, and an initial six acre land purchase was made in November; one tenant refused to vacate, however, and William Crawford, one of the trustees of the nascent academy, donated an adjacent two acre lot the following May. The cornerstone was laid in August, and the school finally opened in October 1827.

The school operated as a private academy until 1876. In that year the building was leased to the two local public school districts, and the private academy was abandoned. Two years later the public schools were consolidated into a single Middletown school district, centered on the old academy building. Classes continued to be held there until 1929, when a new public school building was opened in the town. Eventually the academy trustees sold the building to the federal government, which planned to build a post office on the property. Popular reaction led to the formation of the St. Georges Hundred Historical Society, which took possession of the building in 1945. The town purchased the property in 1960, and over the years used it to house offices, a library, a police station and a meeting hall.
