= Granite City YMCA =

- U.S. National Register of Historic Places
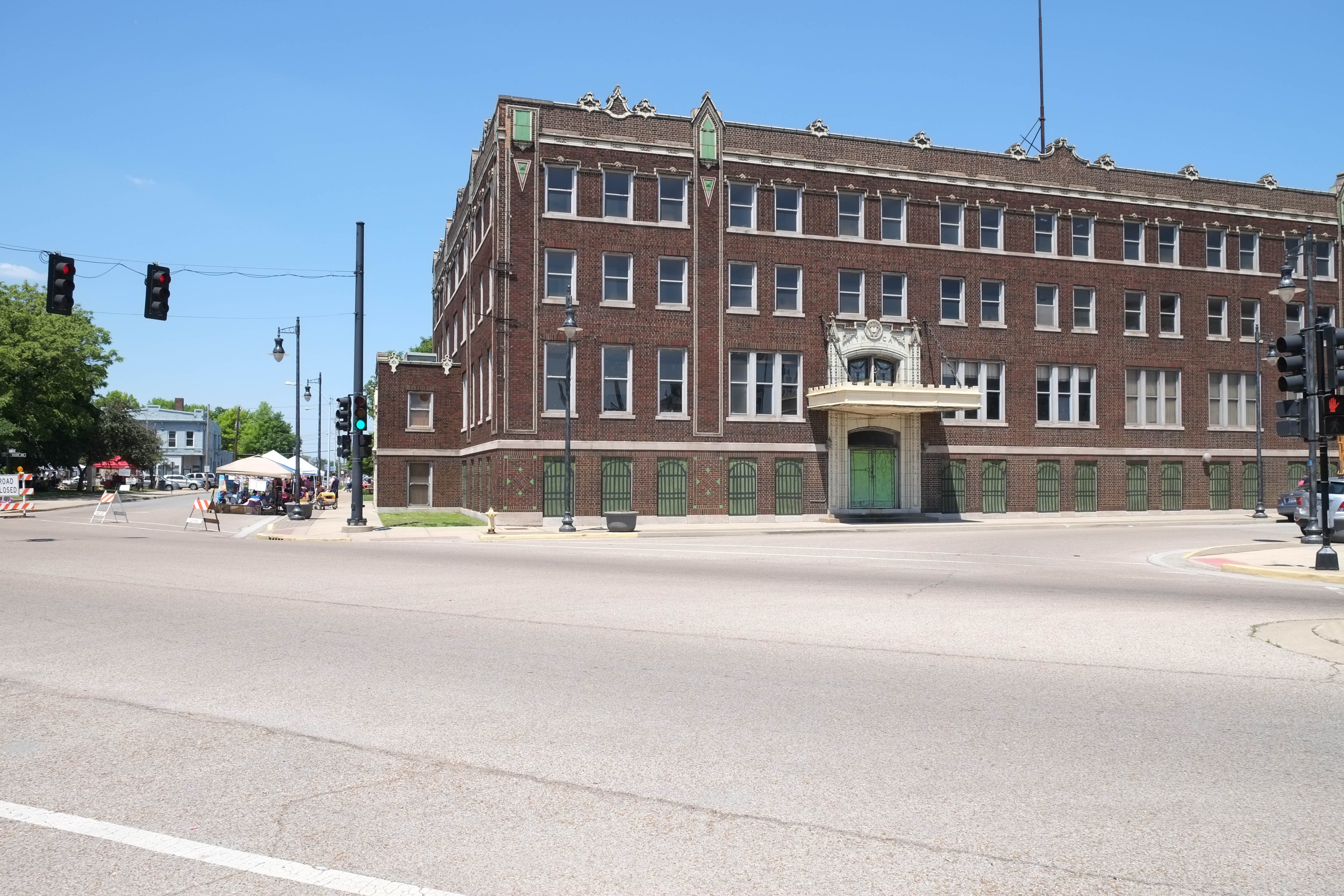
- Granite City YMCA

- Location within Illinois Location within the United States
- Location: 2001 Edison Ave., Granite City, Illinois
- Coordinates: 38°42′06″N 90°08′56″W
- Built: 1924-26
- Architectural style: Late Gothic Revival
- NRHP reference No.: 100001564
- Added to NRHP: September 5, 2017

The Granite City YMCA is a historic YMCA building located at 2001 Edison Avenue in Granite City, Illinois. The building was built in 1924–26 for Granite City's branch of the YMCA, which was founded in 1916. St. Louis, Missouri-based architects Wedemeyer and Nelson designed the Late Gothic Revival style building; their design features a red brick and green tile exterior punctuated by vertical shafts and topped by a parapet. The building is the only institutional building in Granite City designed in the Gothic Revival style. The YMCA used the building for their activities, which included athletics, community education and citizenship classes, community gatherings, and charity work. The building closed in 2004 when the YMCA moved elsewhere.

The building was added to the National Register of Historic Places on September 5, 2017.
