= Miners Institute Building =

- U.S. National Register of Historic Places
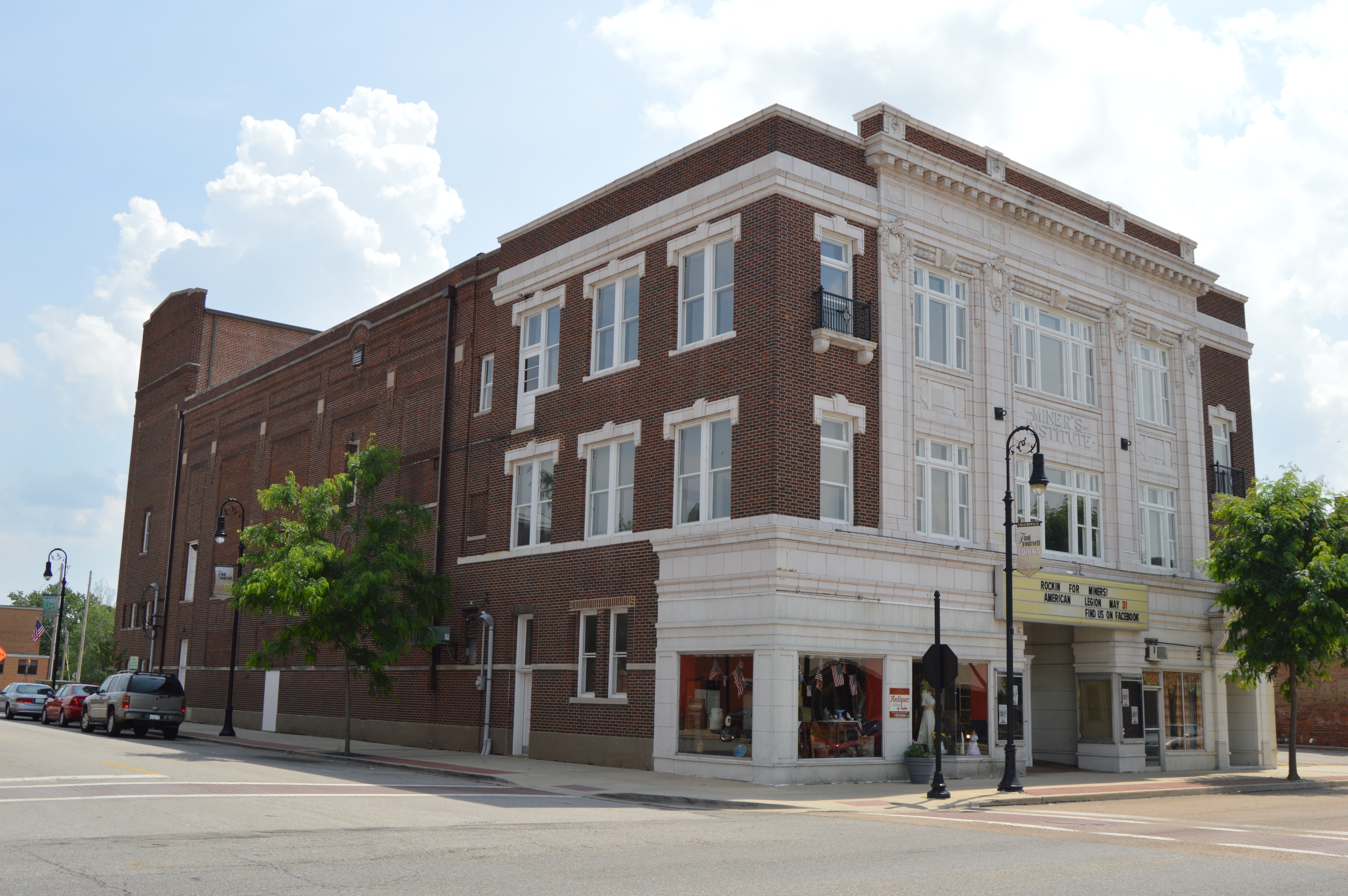
- Eastern side and front

- Location within Illinois Location within the United States
- Location: 204 W. Main, Collinsville, Illinois
- Coordinates: 38°40′9″N 89°59′15″W
- Area: less than one acre
- Built: 1918
- Built by: Eberhart, H.W.
- Architect: Kirsh, R.G.
- Architectural style: Renaissance
- NRHP reference No.: 85001913
- Added to NRHP: August 29, 1985

The Miners Institute Building (also known as the Miners Theater) is a historic commercial building located at 204 West Main in Collinsville, Illinois.

== Description and history ==
The state and local chapters of the United Mine Workers Association commissioned the three-story building, which opened in 1918. The building served as Collinsville's first public theater as well as office space and a meeting hall for union activities. Local community groups also used the building for meeting space, and Collinsville's public library began in the building. Coal mining was Collinsville's first major industry, and it dominated the city's economy in the 1910s; the building is a remnant of the industry's influence over the city.

The building was added to the National Register of Historic Places on August 29, 1985.
