= Alton Gas & Electric Power House =

- U.S. National Register of Historic Places
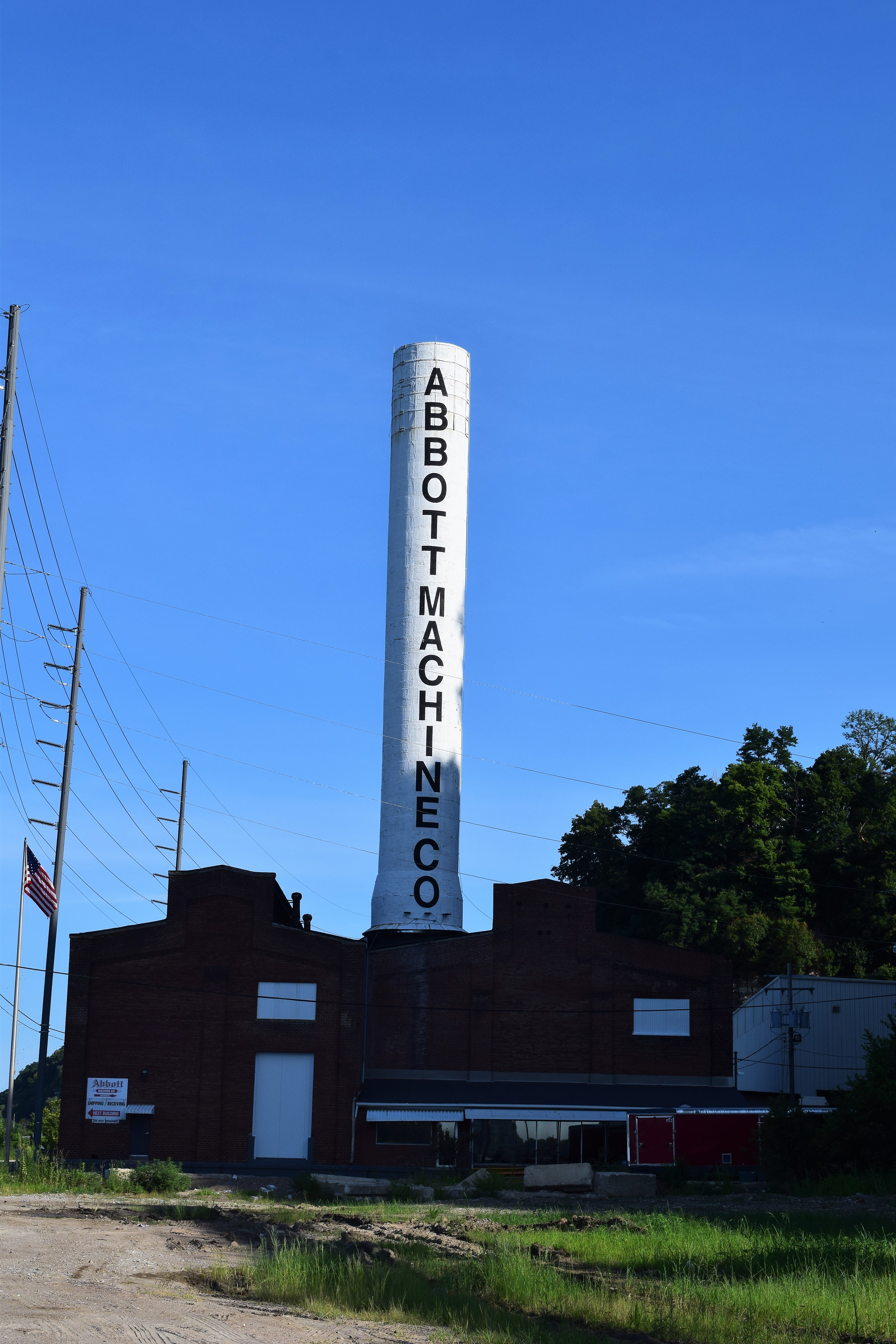

- Location within Illinois Location within the United States
- Location: 700 W. Broadway, Alton, Illinois
- Coordinates: 38°53′39″N 90°11′47″W
- Built: 1913-14
- NRHP reference No.: 100004309
- Added to NRHP: August 28, 2019

The Alton Gas & Electric Power House is a former hydroelectric power plant at 700 W. Broadway in Alton, Illinois.

== History ==
Built in 1913–14, the plant was a substation for the hydroelectric power system which had recently been built in Keokuk, Iowa. Alton relied on coal power for its electricity, and the hydroelectric plant helped lower energy costs in the city. The plant went online in 1915 and served as the city's primary power plant until 1928, when a series of mergers and reorganizations resulted in the Union Electric Company, which had also bought the Keokuk hydroelectric plant, purchasing the plant from Alton Gas & Electric. After 1928, the station only served as an emergency backup for Union Electric's other substations, and it closed for good in 1937.

The building has since been used for machining operations and briefly served as an automobile dealership. The plant Abbott Machine Company has owned it since 1950.

The building was added to the National Register of Historic Places on August 28, 2019.
