= Peter P. Post House =

Historic house in New Jersey, United States

- U.S. National Register of Historic Places
- New Jersey Register of Historic Places
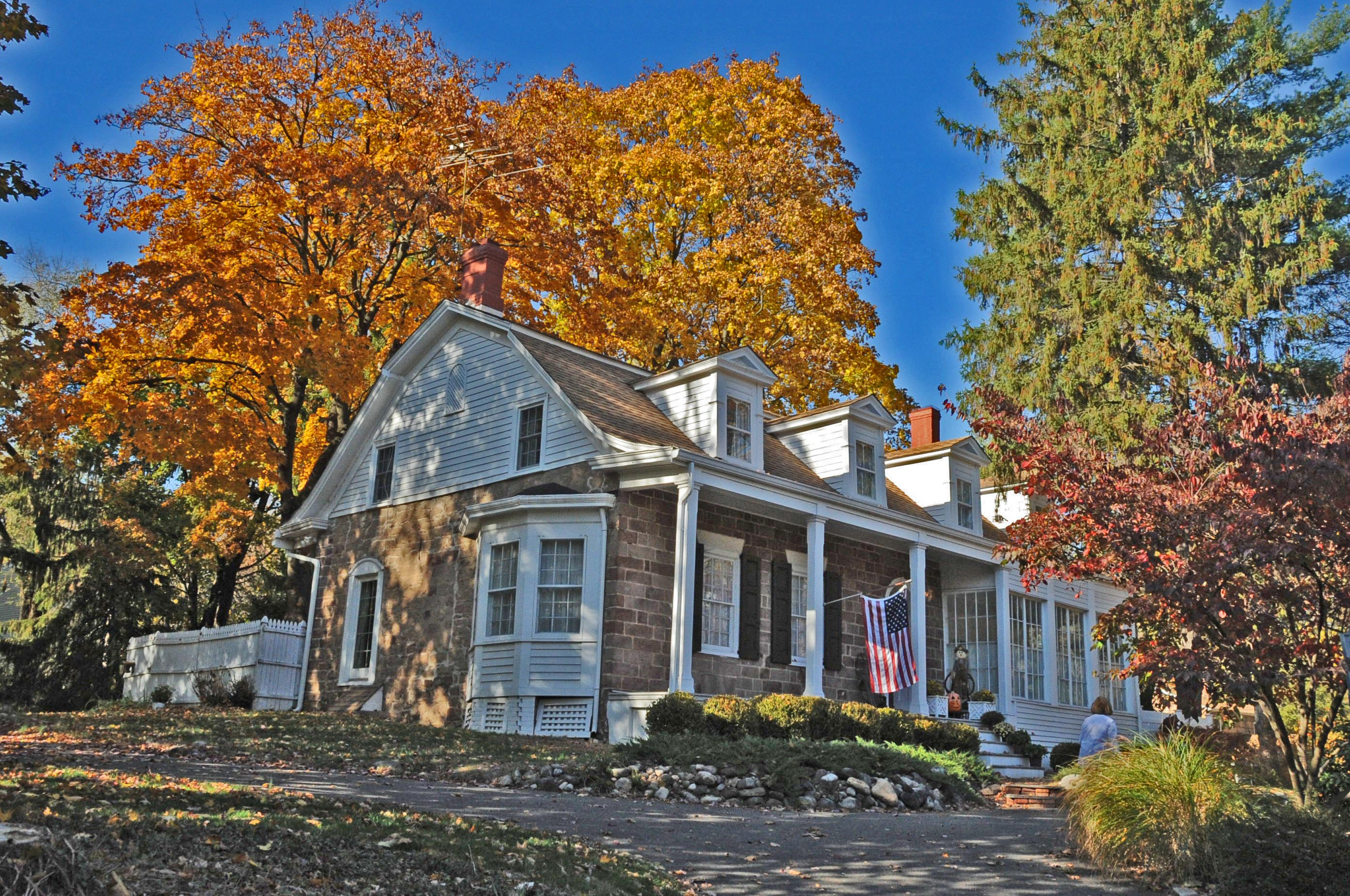

- Location within Bergen County, New Jersey
- Location: 259 Pascack Road, Woodcliff Lake, New Jersey
- Coordinates: 41°1′3″N 74°2′53″W
- NRHP reference No.: 83001543
- NJRHP No.: 725

Significant dates
- Added to NRHP: January 10, 1983
- Designated NJRHP: December 3, 1980

The Peter P. Post House is an historic home in Woodcliff Lake, in Bergen County, New Jersey, United States. The house was built in the 18th century, and was added to the National Register of Historic Places on January 10, 1983. The Peter P. Post House was added to the register as an example of one of the early stone houses in Bergen County.

== See also ==
- National Register of Historic Places listings in Bergen County, New Jersey
