= State Bank Building (Collinsville, Illinois) =

- U.S. National Register of Historic Places
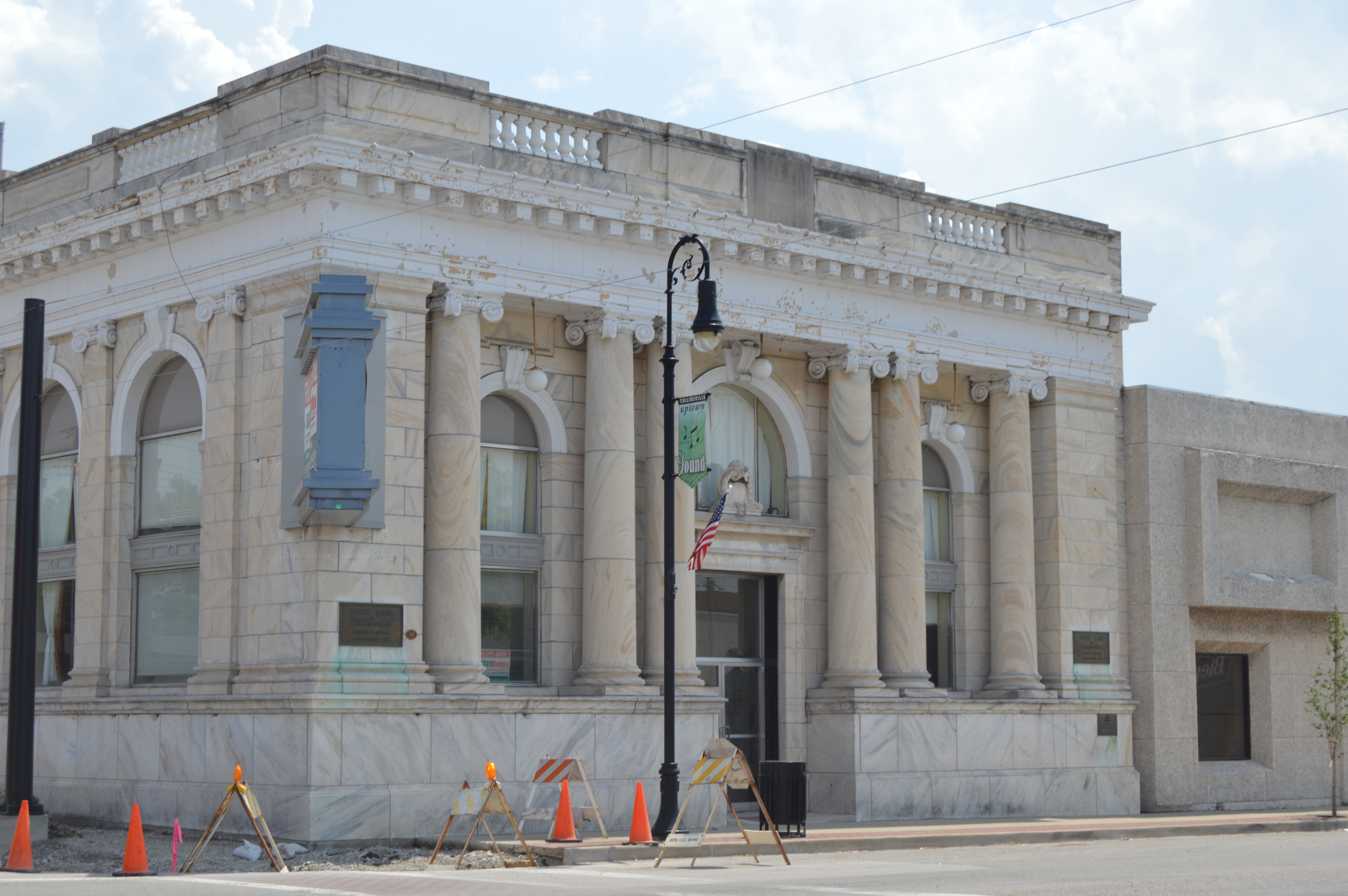
- Front of the bank

- Location within Illinois Location within the United States
- Location: 102 W. Main, Collinsville, Illinois
- Coordinates: 38°40′12″N 89°59′12″W
- Area: less than one acre
- Built: 1916
- Architect: Kirsch, Robert G.
- Architectural style: Classical Revival
- NRHP reference No.: 09000233
- Added to NRHP: April 23, 2010

The State Bank Building is a historic bank building located at 102 W. Main St. in Collinsville, Illinois. Built in 1916, the bank was the third used by the State Bank, which was chartered in 1891. Architect Robert G. Kirsch designed the building in the Classical Revival style. The building's north and east facades are faced with Amicoloa marble. The front entrance is located on the north side, which has three arched bays flanked by Ionic columns. The front foundation extends 5 feet (1.5 m) above the ground; the entrance is located in a recessed break in the center of the facade. The facade is topped by an entablature, a dentillated cornice, and a marble parapet. The five bays on the building's east side are similar to the front bays; six Ionic pilasters flank these bays.

The building was added to the National Register of Historic Places on April 23, 2010.
