= John Weir House =

Historic house in Illinois, United States

- U.S. National Register of Historic Places
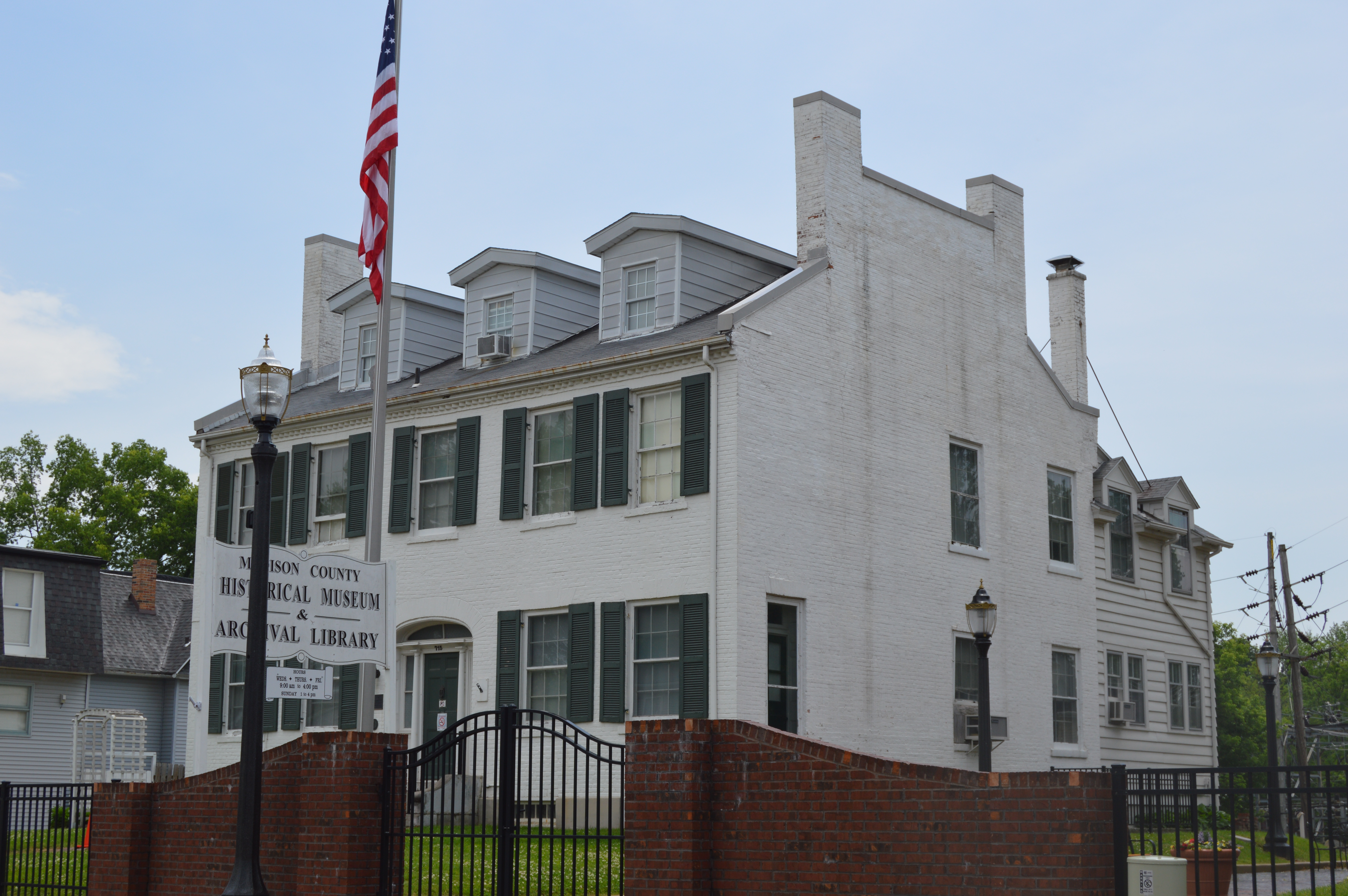
- Northern end and front

- Location within Illinois Location within the United States
- Location: 715 N. Main St., Edwardsville, Illinois
- Coordinates: 38°48′59″N 89°57′42″W
- Area: less than one acre
- Built: 1836
- Architectural style: Federal
- NRHP reference No.: 83000329
- Added to NRHP: May 9, 1983

The John Weir House is a historic house located at 715 N. Main St. in Edwardsville, Illinois. Built in 1836, the house is the second-oldest in Edwardsville after the Benjamin Stephenson House. The two-and-one-half story brick house is designed in the Federal style. The front facade of the house has five bays with a central entrance; the entrance is surrounded by a fan light and an arched lintel. The house's gable roof features three dormers on either side, chimneys at either end, and a brick cornice on the rear edge. Dr. John Weir, the owner of the house, ran his doctor's office in the house with his son Edward until the former's death in 1878. In 1963, the Madison County Historical Society purchased the house and converted it to a museum.

The house was added to the National Register of Historic Places on May 9, 1983.
