= Glen Carbon Grade School =

- U.S. National Register of Historic Places
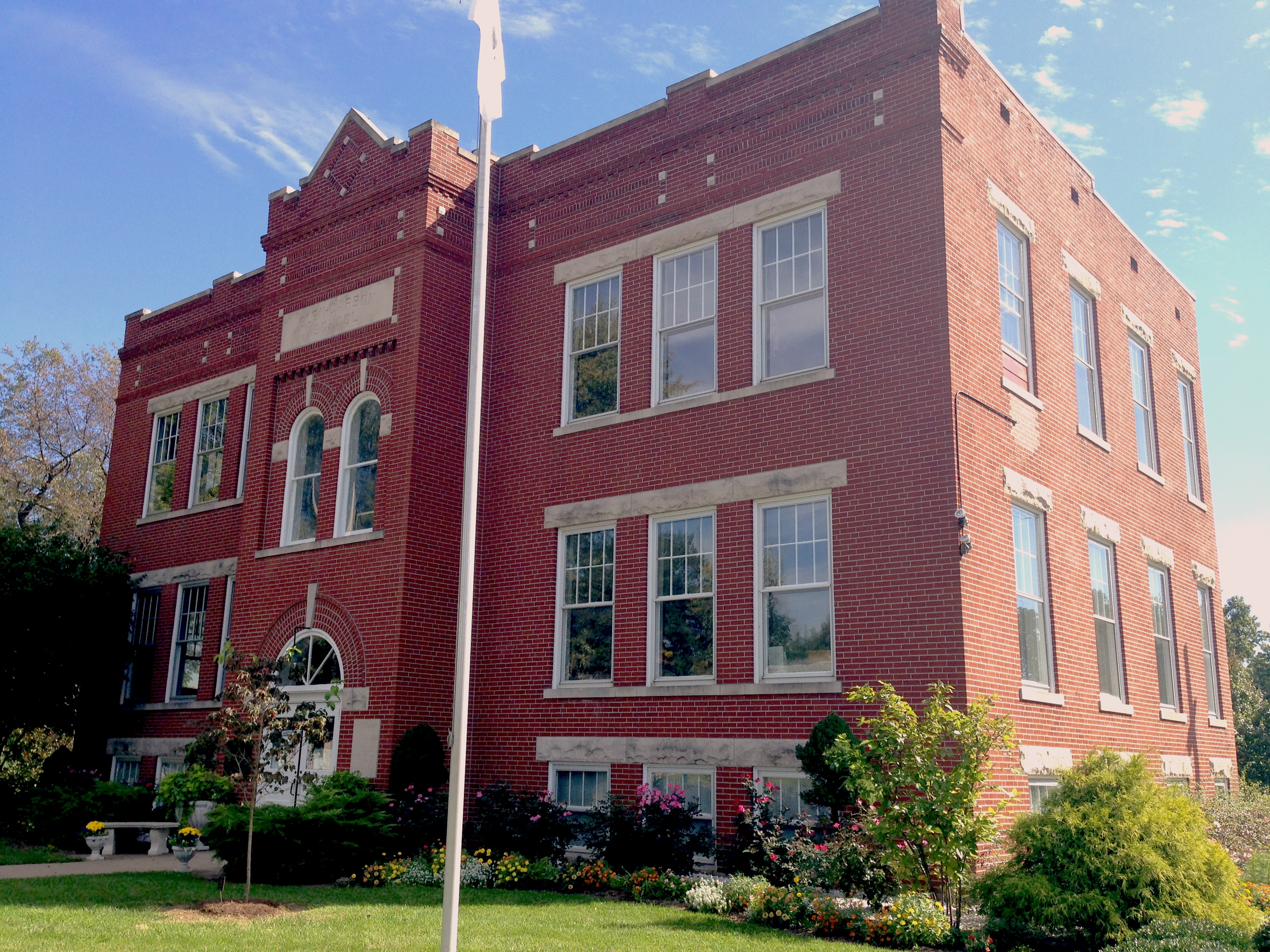

- Location within Illinois Location within the United States
- Location: 124 School St., Glen Carbon, Illinois
- Coordinates: 38°44′55″N 89°58′43″W
- Built: 1914
- Architectural style: Romanesque Revival
- NRHP reference No.: 14000507
- Added to NRHP: August 25, 2014

The Glen Carbon Grade School is a historic school building located at 124 School Street in Glen Carbon, Illinois. The two-story brick school has a Romanesque-influenced design planned by John William Kennedy. The school was built in 1914 to replace Glen Carbon's one-room schoolhouse, which its student population had outgrown. A four-room frame building supplemented both the old and new schools, so Glen Carbon had eight classrooms in total with its new school. Grades one through four were taught in the new building, while the upper grades used the frame building. The school was part of the Edwardsville school district, and students who wished to attend high school did so in Edwardsville. Glen Carbon was a European immigrant community, and its students reflected the village's wide variety of ethnic groups. The parents of the village, who mainly worked as coal miners, often volunteered for school events. When a new school opened in 1954, the village purchased the building for office space; it now houses the Glen Carbon Heritage Museum.

The building was added to the National Register of Historic Places on August 25, 2014.
