= St. Louis Street Historic District =

Historic district in Illinois, United States

- U.S. National Register of Historic Places
- U.S. Historic district
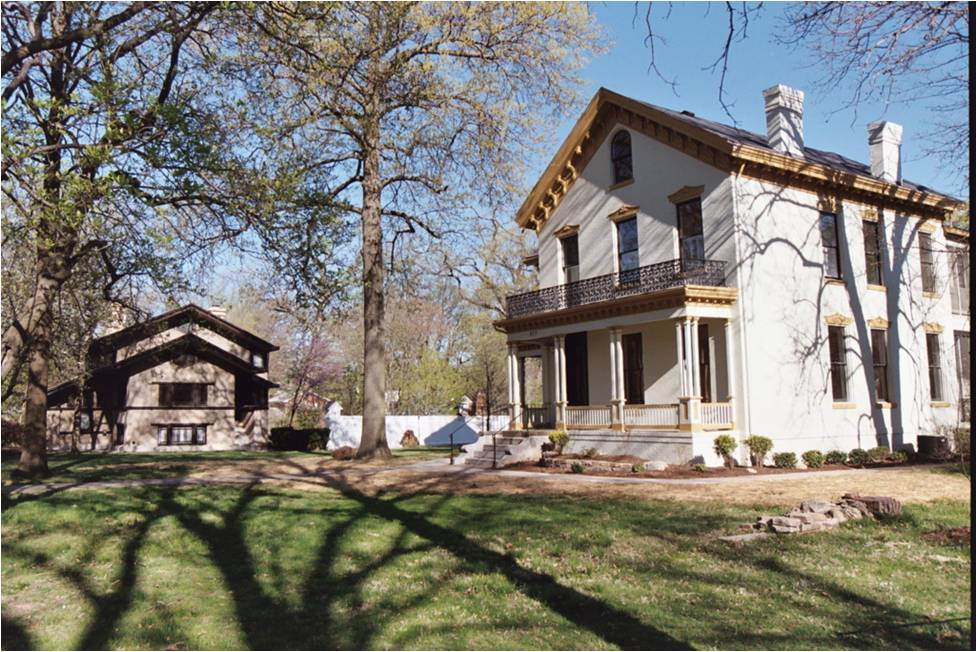
- The E.M. West and Ralph Griffin Houses

- Location within Illinois Location within the United States
- Location: 603-1306 St. Louis St., Edwardsville, Illinois
- Coordinates: 38°48′39″N 89°58′07″W
- Area: 35 acres (14 ha)
- Architectural style: Queen Anne, Italianate
- NRHP reference No.: 83000328
- Added to NRHP: May 9, 1983

The St. Louis Street Historic District is a residential historic district located along several blocks of St. Louis Street in Edwardsville, Illinois. The district includes 59 homes, of which 51 are considered contributing to the district's historic character. St. Louis Street was one of the most prestigious sections of Edwardsville in the late 1800s, and several of the city's wealthiest residents owned homes along the street. The first house on the street, a log cabin, was built by John Lusk in 1809. In the 1870s, prominent residents of Edwardsville began building homes on the south side of St. Louis Street; these houses typically had large plots and open parkland between lots. In 1883, Judge Joseph Gillespie divided and sold the land on the north side of the street; the homes built on these lots are consequently much closer together. The homes built in the district were designed in popular architectural styles of the late 1800s; while the Queen Anne style is the most prevalent, Italianate, Chateauesque, and Classical Revival houses were also built.

The district was added to the National Register of Historic Places on May 9, 1983.

== See also ==
- Historic Saint Louis Street Association
