= Post House (Alton, Illinois) =

Historic house in Illinois, United States

- U.S. National Register of Historic Places
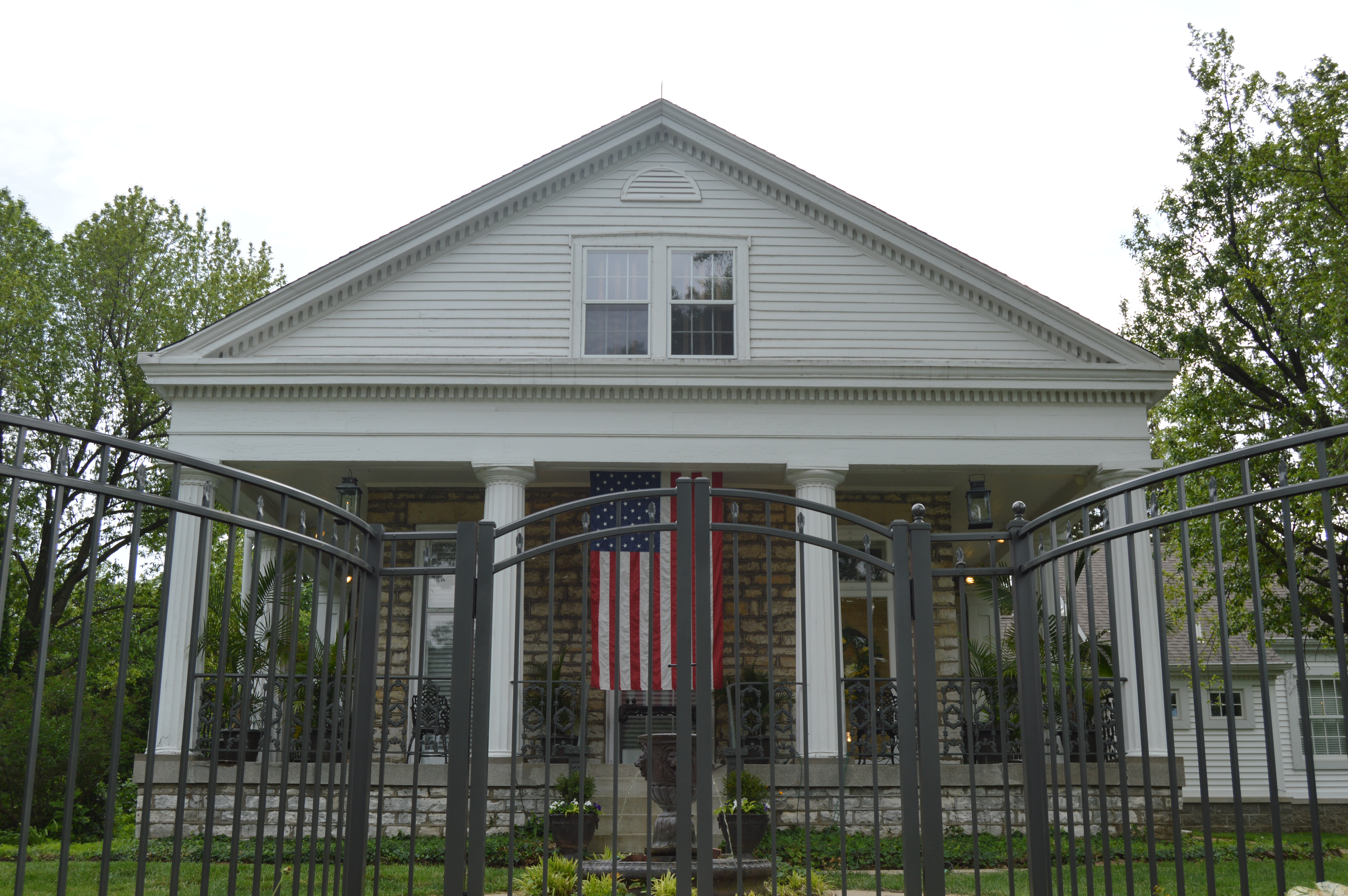
- Seen from across the street

- Location within Illinois Location within the United States
- Interactive map showing the location of Post House
- Location: 1516 State St., Alton, Illinois
- Coordinates: 38°54′21″N 90°11′43″W
- Area: less than one acre
- Built: 1837-38
- Architectural style: Greek Revival
- NRHP reference No.: 80001390
- Added to NRHP: May 28, 1980

The Post House is a historic house located at 1516 State St. in Alton, Illinois, United States. William Post, a steamboat captain who later became mayor of Alton, built the house in 1837–38. The brick and limestone house is designed in the Greek Revival style. The house's front facade features four Doric columns topped by an entablature and a pedimented gable end. The front porch of the house wraps around both sides, each of which has an additional column and a pilaster. The cornice and front pediment are both dentillated. James Patterson, owner of the Illinois Iron Works, purchased the house in 1854; Patterson may have added the iron porch railing.

The house was added to the National Register of Historic Places on May 28, 1980.
