= Madison County Sheriff's House and Jail =

- Formerly listed on the U.S. National Register of Historic Places
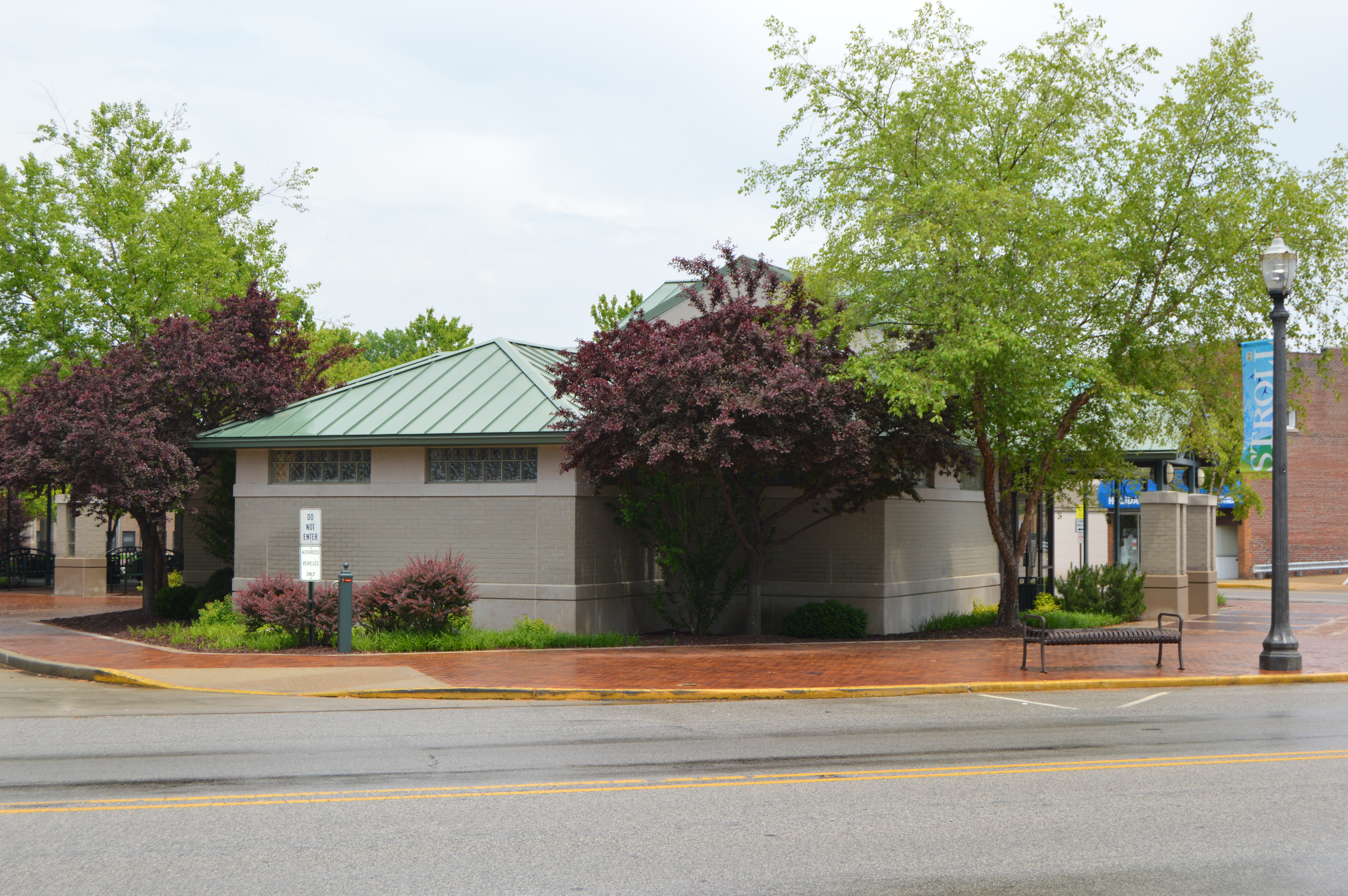
- Site of the sheriff's house and jail, now destroyed

- Location within Illinois Location within the United States
- Location: 210 N. Main St., Edwardsville, Illinois
- Coordinates: 38°48′48″N 89°57′27″W
- Area: 0.7 acres (0.28 ha)
- Built: 1869
- Built by: Alonzo Keller
- Architectural style: Second Empire
- NRHP reference No.: 80001394

Significant dates
- Added to NRHP: May 31, 1980
- Removed from NRHP: January 2, 2020

The Madison County Sheriff's House and Jail was a historic house and jail building located at 210 N. Main St. in Edwardsville, Illinois. Built in 1869 and opened in 1871, the building was the oldest Madison County government building in Edwardsville, the county seat. The building consisted of a three-story sheriff's house and an adjacent cell block; the cell block was expanded in 1904 to provide space for female prisoners. The sheriff's house was designed in the Second Empire style; it was one of two examples of the style in Edwardsville and the only one which had maintained its historical appearance. The building's design featured a mansard roof, two dormers on both the front and rear sides, and a bracketed wooden cornice.

The building was added to the National Register of Historic Places on May 31, 1980, and was delisted in 2020.
