= Middletown Historic District (Alton, Illinois) =

Historic district in Illinois, United States

- U.S. National Register of Historic Places
- U.S. Historic district
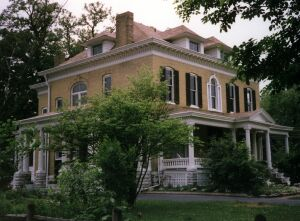
- The Beall Mansion, 407 E. 12th St.

- Location within Illinois Location within the United States
- Location: Roughly bounded by Broadway, Market, Alton, Franklin, Common, Liberty, Humboldt, and Plum Sts., Alton, Illinois
- Coordinates: 38°53′41″N 90°10′28″W
- Area: 232 acres (94 ha)
- Architectural style: Italianate, Queen Anne, Federal
- NRHP reference No.: 78001166 (original); 82002583 (increase 1); 100007272 (increase 2)

Significant dates
- Added to NRHP: July 11, 1978
- Boundary increases: September 16, 1982; January 4, 2022

The Middletown Historic District is a historic district in Alton, Illinois. The primarily residential district includes portions of Alton's Middletown and Hunterstown neighborhoods and comprises 653 buildings, 613 of which are contributing buildings. Settlement in the district dates to the original plat of Alton in 1817, which included the southern half of Middletown. Development in the district continued through the 19th century and into the 20th, spanning all of Alton's early history. The district also represents multiple eras of Alton's architectural history. Most early houses in the district were designed in the Federal style, while the Italianate and Queen Anne styles were predominant in the latter half of the 19th century.

The district was added to the National Register of Historic Places on July 11, 1978. in 1982, the boundaries of the district were expanded to include Alton's Pagan Hill neighborhood. In January 2022, the boundaries were expanded again and now take in most of downtown Alton. The expanded area includes 134 new properties covering 11 blocks in the downtown area stretching from State Street to Ridge Street along Third Street, Broadway, and Front Street/Landmarks Boulevard.
