= Berleman House =

Historic house in Illinois, United States

- U.S. National Register of Historic Places
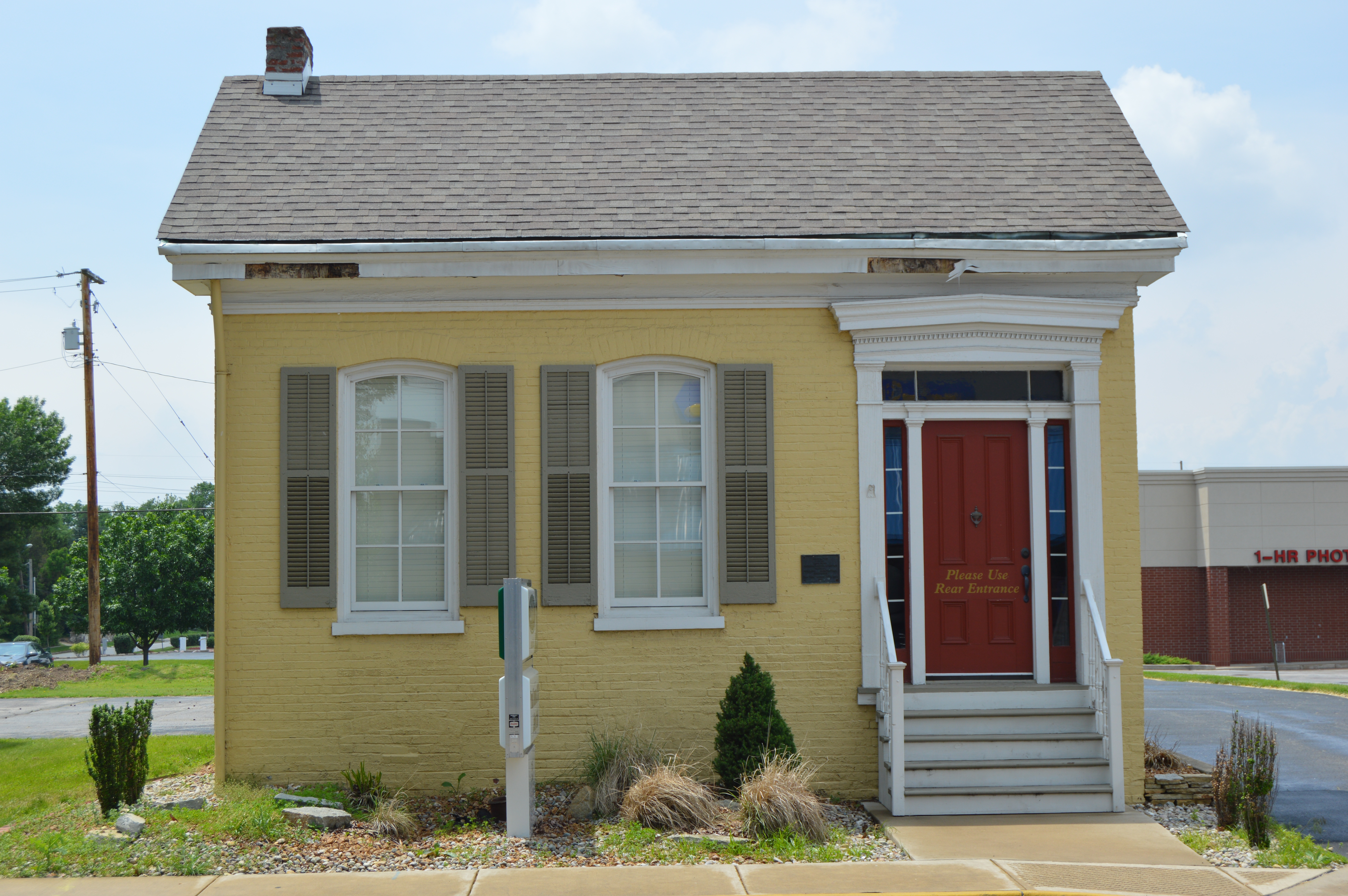
- Front of the house

- Location within Illinois Location within the United States
- Location: 115 S. Main St., Edwardsville, Illinois
- Coordinates: 38°48′38″N 89°57′21″W
- Area: less than one acre
- Built by: Morrison, Samual
- Architect: Spillman, Charles
- Architectural style: Greek Revival
- NRHP reference No.: 80001391
- Added to NRHP: March 27, 1980

The Berleman House is a historic house located at 115 S. Main St. in Edwardsville, Illinois, USA. It was built between 1864 and 1868 by Samual Morrison. The architect Charles Spillman designed the house in the Greek Revival style. It is a one-story brick building topped by a gable roof. The front entrance features a pediment supported by Doric pilasters. Smaller pillars flank the recessed door, which has sidelights and a transom. C Herman Berleman, a carpenter, purchased the house in 1868 and his family lived there until 1962. In 1895, Berleman built a frame addition on the back of the house.

The house was added to the National Register of Historic Places on March 27, 1980.
