= Foster Township, Madison County, Illinois =

Foster Township
- Township

- Location of Illinois in the United States
- Coordinates: 38°57′46″N 90°05′59″W
- Country: United States
- State: Illinois
- County: Madison
- Settled: November 2, 1875

Area
  - Total: 31.34 sq mi (81.2 km^{2})
  - Land: 30.86 sq mi (79.9 km^{2})
  - Water: 0.48 sq mi (1.2 km^{2})
- Elevation: 548 ft (167 m)

Population (2010)
  - Estimate (2016): 4,020
  - Density: 132.6/sq mi (51.2/km^{2})
- Time zone: UTC-6 (CST)
  - Summer (DST): UTC-5 (CDT)
- FIPS code: 17-119-27182
- Website: fostertownshipil.org

Foster Township is located in Madison County, Illinois, in the United States. As of the 2010 census, its population was 4,091 and it contained 1,663 housing units.

== History ==
Foster is the name of Oliver Foster, a pioneer settler and native of New Hampshire.

== Geography ==
According to the 2010 census, the township has a total area of 31.34 square miles (81.2 km^{2}), of which 30.86 square miles (79.9 km^{2}) (or 98.47%) is land and 0.48 square miles (1.2 km^{2}) (or 1.53%) is water.

== Demographics ==
Historical population
Census	Pop.	Note	%±
2016 (est.)	4,020
U.S. Decennial Census
