= National Register of Historic Places listings in Greene County, Illinois =

Location of Greene County in Illinois

This is a list of the National Register of Historic Places listings in Greene County, Illinois.

This is intended to be a complete list of the properties and districts on the National Register of Historic Places in Greene County, Illinois, United States. Latitude and longitude coordinates are provided for many National Register properties and districts; these locations may be seen together in a map.

There are 11 properties and districts listed on the National Register in the county.

This National Park Service list is complete through NPS recent listings posted December 12, 2025.

== Current listings ==
	Name on the Register	Image	Date listed	Location	City or town	Description
1	Black Homestead Farm	Black Homestead Farm	May 24, 2005 (#05000110)	RR 3; 39°17′37″N 90°26′45″W	Carrollton	
2	Carrollton Courthouse Square Historic District	Carrollton Courthouse Square Historic District	August 1, 1985 (#85001667)	Roughly bounded by S. Main, W. 5th, N. Main and W. 6th Sts. 39°18′06″N 90°24′35″W	Carrollton	
3	James John Eldred House	James John Eldred House	June 25, 1999 (#99000732)	Bluffdale Township Rd., E of IL 100; 39°18′29″N 90°32′55″W	Eldred	
4	Hodges House	Hodges House	November 3, 1980 (#80001364)	532 N. Main St. 39°18′08″N 90°24′32″W	Carrollton	
5	Hotel Roodhouse	Hotel Roodhouse	November 7, 1995 (#95001238)	303 Morse St. 39°28′56″N 90°22′22″W	Roodhouse	
6	Koster Site	Koster Site	June 19, 1972 (#72000460)	200 yards (180 m) east of the Eldred-Hillview road, 5.5 miles (8.9 km) south of Eldred; 39°12′33″N 90°32′57″W	Eldred	
7	Mound House Site		September 1, 1978 (#78001148)	Eastern bank of the Illinois River, ½ mile west of the end of 600E; 39°29′36″N 90°35′01″W	Hillview	
8	Henry T. Rainey Farm	Henry T. Rainey Farm	May 12, 1987 (#87000682)	RR 1, N side of IL 108; 39°18′12″N 90°23′14″W	Carrollton	
9	Virginia Tillery Round Barn	Virginia Tillery Round Barn	August 26, 1982 (#82002536)	W of White Hall on CR 738; 39°26′26″N 90°26′37″W	White Hall	
10	White Hall Foundry	White Hall Foundry	May 28, 1980 (#80001365)	102 S. Jacksonville St. 39°26′05″N 90°24′30″W	White Hall	
11	White Hall Historic District	White Hall Historic District	May 20, 1987 (#86003145)	Roughly bounded by Bridgeport, Jacksonville, Ayers, and Main Sts.; also 120 S. Jacksonville St. 39°26′12″N 90°24′11″W	White Hall	120 Jacksonville represents a boundary increase of February 11, 1993

== Former listings ==
	Name on the Register	Image	Date listed	Date removed	Location	City or town	Description
1	Greene County Almshouse	Greene County Almshouse	May 17, 1991 (#91000568)	March 20, 2025	Twp. Rd. TR156A NE of Carrollton; 39°19′47″N 90°21′53″W	Carrollton	

== See also ==
- List of National Historic Landmarks in Illinois
- National Register of Historic Places listings in Illinois
