= Rockbridge, Illinois =

- Village
- Location of Rockbridge in Greene County, Illinois.
- Coordinates: 39°16′09″N 90°12′24″W
- Country: United States
- State: Illinois
- County: Greene
- Township: Rockbridge

Area
  - Total: 0.74 sq mi (1.91 km^{2})
  - Land: 0.74 sq mi (1.91 km^{2})
  - Water: 0 sq mi (0.00 km^{2})
- Elevation: 538 ft (164 m)

Population (2020)
  - Total: 175
  - Density: 237.5/sq mi (91.69/km^{2})
- Time zone: UTC-6 (CST)
  - Summer (DST): UTC-5 (CDT)
- ZIP code: 62081
- Area code: 217
- FIPS code: 17-64811
- GNIS feature ID: 2399103

Rockbridge is a village in southeastern Greene County, Illinois, United States. The population was 175 at the 2020 census.

== Geography ==
Rockbridge is located in southeastern Greene County. Illinois Route 267 passes along the eastern edge of the village, leading north 5 miles (8 km) to Greenfield and south 8 miles (13 km) to Medora. Carrollton, the Greene County seat, is 13 miles (21 km) to the northwest via Routes 267 and Illinois Route 108.

According to the 2021 census gazetteer files, Rockbridge has a total area of 0.74 square miles (1.92 km^{2}), all land.

== Demographics ==
Historical population
Census	Pop.	Note	%±
1880	202		—
1890	148		−26.7%
1900	174		17.6%
1910	275		58.0%
1920	225		−18.2%
1930	243		8.0%
1940	247		1.6%
1950	243		−1.6%
1960	253		4.1%
1970	256		1.2%
1980	258		0.8%
1990	212		−17.8%
2000	189		−10.8%
2010	169		−10.6%
2020	175		3.6%
U.S. Decennial Census

As of the 2020 census there were 175 people, 58 households, and 40 families residing in the village. The population density was 237.45 inhabitants per square mile (91.68/km^{2}). There were 82 housing units at an average density of 111.26 per square mile (42.96/km^{2}). The racial makeup of the village was 95.43% White, 0.57% African American, 0.00% Native American, 0.00% Asian, 0.00% Pacific Islander, 0.00% from other races, and 4.00% from two or more races. Hispanic or Latino of any race were 1.71% of the population.

There were 58 households, out of which 51.7% had children under the age of 18 living with them, 29.31% were married couples living together, 25.86% had a female householder with no husband present, and 31.03% were non-families. 29.31% of all households were made up of individuals, and 20.69% had someone living alone who was 65 years of age or older. The average household size was 4.63 and the average family size was 3.71.

The village's age distribution consisted of 38.1% under the age of 18, 0.0% from 18 to 24, 17.3% from 25 to 44, 27.6% from 45 to 64, and 17.2% who were 65 years of age or older. The median age was 31.8 years. For every 100 females, there were 97.2 males. For every 100 females age 18 and over, there were 72.7 males.

The median income for a household in the village was $56,250, and the median income for a family was $53,750. Males had a median income of $48,438 versus $23,750 for females. The per capita income for the village was $19,059. About 40.0% of families and 27.4% of the population were below the poverty line, including 46.3% of those under age 18 and 8.1% of those age 65 or over
