= Drake, Illinois =

- Unincorporated community
- Location of Drake within Illinois Drake, Illinois (the United States)
- Coordinates: 39°27′31″N 90°28′25″W
- Country: United States
- State: Illinois
- County: Greene
- Township: Patterson

Population (2000)
  - Total: 14
- Time zone: UTC-6 (CST)
  - Summer (DST): UTC-5 (CDT)

Drake, or Hanks Station, is an unincorporated community located in Patterson Township, Greene County, Illinois, United States, between the town of Patterson and the White Hall – Hillview blacktop. The unofficial population is around 10 people.
