= Woodson, Illinois =

- Village
- Location in Morgan County, Illinois
- Coordinates: 39°37′29″N 90°13′33″W
- Country: United States
- State: Illinois
- County: Morgan
- Platted: May 2, 1859
- Incorporated: April 9, 1894

Area
  - Total: 0.39 sq mi (1.02 km^{2})
  - Land: 0.39 sq mi (1.02 km^{2})
  - Water: 0 sq mi (0.00 km^{2})
- Elevation: 673 ft (205 m)

Population (2020)
  - Total: 498
  - Density: 1,265.5/sq mi (488.62/km^{2})
- Time zone: UTC-6 (CST)
  - Summer (DST): UTC-5 (CDT)
- ZIP code: 62695
- Area code: 217
- FIPS code: 17-83336
- GNIS feature ID: 2399737
- Website: woodsonillinois.com

Woodson is a village in Morgan County, Illinois, United States. The population was 498 at the 2020 census. It is part of the Jacksonville Micropolitan Statistical Area.

== History ==
The village was platted on May 2, 1859, and incorporated on April 9, 1894. The village is named after Judge David M. Woodson.

== Geography ==
Woodson is located south of Lake Jacksonville and south of combined U.S. Route 36 and Interstate 72. It lies mainly on the east side of State Highway 267, which leads north 7 miles (11 km) to Jacksonville, the Morgan county seat, and south 20 miles (32 km) to Greenfield.

According to the U.S. Census Bureau, Woodson has a total area of 0.39 square miles (1.01 km^{2}), all land. Spoon Creek runs along the northern edge of the village, flowing west toward Sandy Creek, a southwest-flowing tributary of the Illinois River.

== Demographics ==
Historical population
Census	Pop.	Note	%±
1880	90		—
1900	255		—
1910	257		0.8%
1920	231		−10.1%
1930	272		17.7%
1940	266		−2.2%
1950	211		−20.7%
1960	229		8.5%
1970	384		67.7%
1980	503		31.0%
1990	472		−6.2%
2000	559		18.4%
2010	512		−8.4%
2020	498		−2.7%
U.S. Decennial Census

As of the census of 2000, there were 559 people, 209 households, and 165 families residing in the village. The population density was 1,442.6 inhabitants per square mile (557.0/km^{2}). There were 219 housing units at an average density of 565.2 per square mile (218.2/km^{2}). The racial makeup of the village was 96.96% White, 0.72% African American, 0.36% Native American, 0.36% Asian, 0.54% from other races, and 1.07% from two or more races. Hispanic or Latino of any race were 0.89% of the population.

There were 209 households, out of which 44.0% had children under the age of 18 living with them, 65.1% were married couples living together, 12.4% had a female householder with no husband present, and 20.6% were non-families. 16.7% of all households were made up of individuals, and 6.7% had someone living alone who was 65 years of age or older. The average household size was 2.67 and the average family size was 2.99.

In the village, the population was spread out, with 28.1% under the age of 18, 8.8% from 18 to 24, 30.8% from 25 to 44, 24.7% from 45 to 64, and 7.7% who were 65 years of age or older. The median age was 35 years. For every 100 females, there were 96.8 males. For every 100 females age 18 and over, there were 85.3 males.

The median income for a household in the village was $41,500, and the median income for a family was $44,375. Males had a median income of $35,435 versus $20,000 for females. The per capita income for the village was $17,175. About 4.2% of families and 6.2% of the population were below the poverty line, including 7.4% of those under age 18 and 9.7% of those age 65 or over.
