= Scottville Township, Macoupin County, Illinois =

Scottville Township
- Township

- Location of Illinois in the United States
- Coordinates: 39°29′N 90°6′W
- Country: United States
- State: Illinois
- County: Macoupin
- Settled: November 1, 1870

Area
  - Total: 36.76 sq mi (95.2 km^{2})
  - Land: 36.74 sq mi (95.2 km^{2})
  - Water: 0.02 sq mi (0.052 km^{2}) 0.04%
- Elevation: 663 ft (202 m)

Population (2020)
  - Total: 260
  - Density: 7.1/sq mi (2.7/km^{2})
- Time zone: UTC-6 (CST)
  - Summer (DST): UTC-5 (CDT)
- FIPS code: 17-117-68419

Scottville Township (T12N R9W) is located in Macoupin County, Illinois, United States. As of the 2020 census, its population was 260 and it contained 134 housing units.

== Geography ==
According to the 2021 census gazetteer files, Scottville Township has a total area of 36.76 square miles (95.21 km^{2}), of which 36.74 square miles (95.16 km^{2}) (or 99.96%) is land and 0.02 square miles (0.05 km^{2}) (or 0.04%) is water.

== Demographics ==
As of the 2020 census there were 260 people, 143 households, and 103 families residing in the township. The population density was 7.07 inhabitants per square mile (2.73/km^{2}). There were 134 housing units at an average density of 3.65 per square mile (1.41/km^{2}). The racial makeup of the township was 98.08% White, 0.00% African American, 0.77% Native American, 0.38% Asian, 0.00% Pacific Islander, 0.00% from other races, and 0.77% from two or more races. Hispanic or Latino of any race were 0.38% of the population.

There were 143 households, out of which 18.20% had children under the age of 18 living with them, 70.63% were married couples living together, 1.40% had a female householder with no spouse present, and 27.97% were non-families. 17.50% of all households were made up of individuals, and 11.20% had someone living alone who was 65 years of age or older. The average household size was 2.44 and the average family size was 2.33.

According to the 2020 American Community Survey, township's age distribution consisted of 10.6% under the age of 18, 11.5% from 18 to 24, 11.7% from 25 to 44, 41.6% from 45 to 64, and 24.6% who were 65 years of age or older. The median age was 53.9 years. For every 100 females, there were 101.6 males. For every 100 females age 18 and over, there were 92.7 males.

The median income for a household in the township was $35,893, and the median income for a family was $53,750. Males had a median income of $36,071 versus $7,279 for females. The per capita income for the township was $20,962. About 1.9% of families and 17.5% of the population were below the poverty line, including 7.7% of those under age 18 and 5.8% of those age 65 or over.

Historical population
Census	Pop.	Note	%±
2000	356		—
2010	333		−6.5%
2020	260		−21.9%
U.S. Decennial Census

== Adjacent townships ==
- Road District No. 12, Morgan County, Illinois (north)
- North Palmyra Township (east)
- South Palmyra Township (southeast)
- Barr Township (south)
- Rubicon Township, Greene County (southwest)
- Athensville Township, Greene County (west)
- Road District No. 11, Morgan County, Illinois (northwest)
