= South Jacksonville =

South Jacksonville may refer to:

- South Jacksonville, Illinois, a village in Morgan County, Illinois
- South Jacksonville, Florida, a former city in Florida, now Jacksonville's San Marco neighborhood
- Southside (Jacksonville), an area of Jacksonville, including the former city
