= Carrollton Courthouse Square Historic District =

Historic district in Illinois, United States

- U.S. National Register of Historic Places
- U.S. Historic district
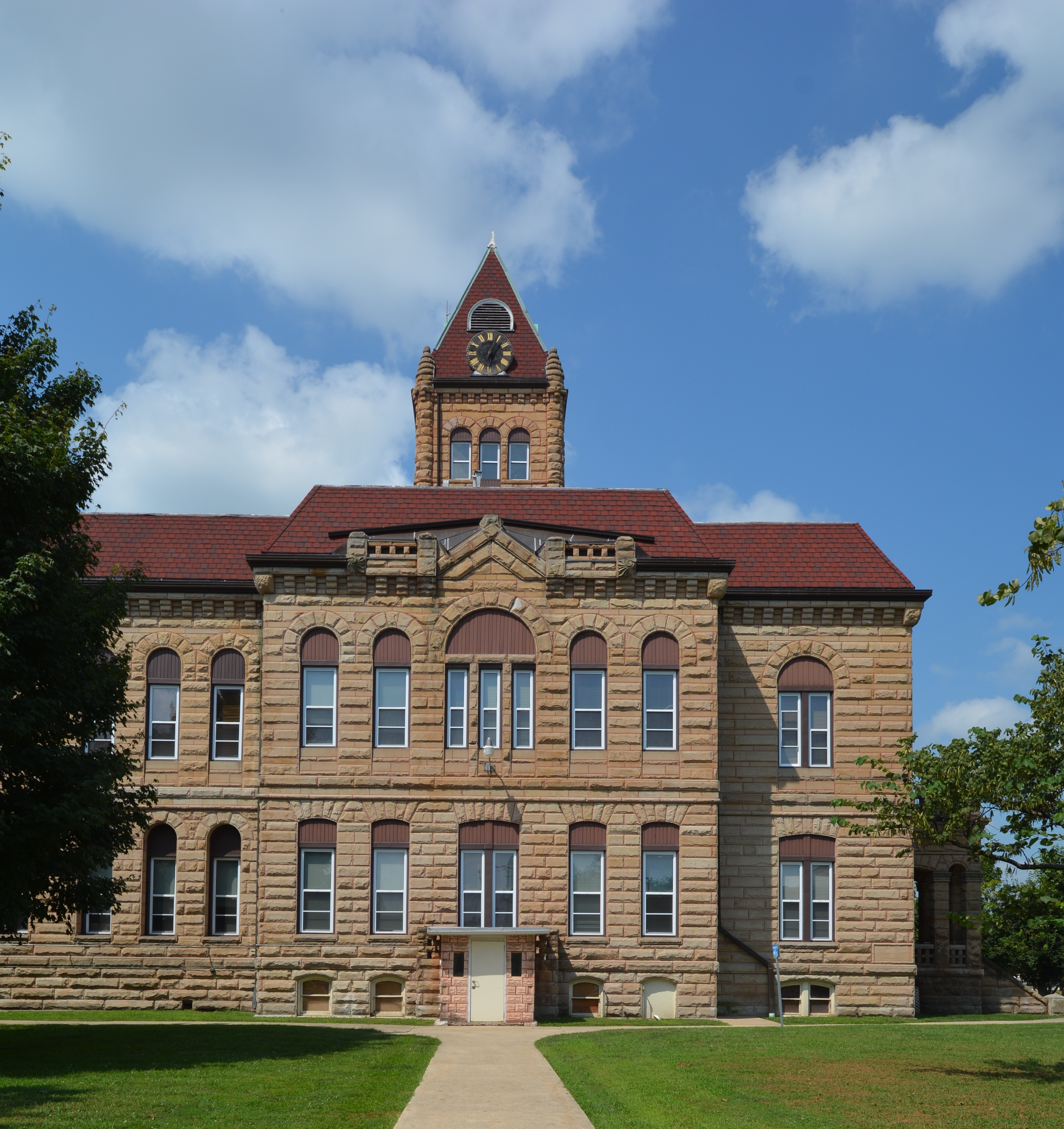
- Greene County Courthouse

- Location within Illinois Location within the United States
- Location: Roughly bounded by S. Main, W. 5th, N. Main and W. 6th Sts., Carrollton, Illinois
- Coordinates: 39°17′48″N 90°24′29″W
- Area: 4 acres (1.6 ha)
- Built: Various
- NRHP reference No.: 85001667
- Added to NRHP: August 1, 1985

Carrollton Courthouse Square Historic District is a historic district encompassing the courthouse square and surrounding commercial district in Carrollton, Greene County, Illinois. The district is centered on the Greene County Courthouse, a limestone Romanesque Revival building built in 1891–92. The courthouse occupies an entire city block at the center of the district. The twelve quarter blocks surrounding the courthouse comprise Carrollton's only business district. Development in the area began in 1821, when the first courthouse was built; at the time, the square was surrounded by new houses. The only house remaining from this period is the Hodges House, which was built in 1829 and is now a historical museum. The square assumed its commercial character between 1830 and 1855, when several brick stores were constructed. After 1855, the square gained several two- and three-story commercial buildings, which form the predominant type in the district. In addition to the commercial buildings, Carrollton's public library and post office are also located on the square.

The district was added to the National Register of Historic Places on August 1, 1985.
