= Wrights, Illinois =

- Unincorporated community
- Location within Illinois Location within the United States
- Coordinates: 39°22′33″N 90°17′39″W
- Country: United States
- State: Illinois
- County: Greene
- Township: Wrights
- Elevation: 577 ft (176 m)
- Time zone: UTC-6 (Central (CST))
  - Summer (DST): UTC-5 (CDT)
- ZIP code: 62098
- Area code: 217
- GNIS feature ID: 421532

Wrights is an unincorporated community in Wrights Township, Greene County, Illinois, United States. Wrights is 5 miles (8.0 km) northwest of Greenfield and has a post office with ZIP code 62098.

== Notable people ==
- Roy V. Scott (1927–2021) – historian
