= Belltown, Illinois =

Belltown New Providence
- Unincorporated community
- Location of Belltown within Illinois Belltown (the United States)
- Coordinates: 39°23′01″N 90°24′31″W
- Country: United States
- State: Illinois
- County: Greene
- Township: White Hall
- Established: 1867
- Elevation: 495 ft (151 m)
- Time zone: UTC-6 (CST)
  - Summer (DST): UTC-5 (CDT)
- GNIS feature ID: 422455

Belltown is an unincorporated community in White Hall Township, Greene County, Illinois, United States. The community is located along U.S. Route 67 between White Hall and Carrollton.
