= Rockbridge Township, Greene County, Illinois =

Rockbridge Township
- Township
- Location in Greene County

- Greene County's location in Illinois
- Coordinates: 39°17′18″N 90°12′50″W
- Country: United States
- State: Illinois
- County: Greene
- Established: November 4, 1884

Area
  - Total: 47.81 sq mi (123.8 km^{2})
  - Land: 47.69 sq mi (123.5 km^{2})
  - Water: 0.12 sq mi (0.31 km^{2}) 0.24%
- Elevation: 515 ft (157 m)

Population (2020)
  - Total: 1,562
  - Density: 32.75/sq mi (12.65/km^{2})
- Time zone: UTC-6 (CST)
  - Summer (DST): UTC-5 (CDT)
- ZIP codes: 62016, 62044, 62081, 62630
- FIPS code: 17-061-64824

Rockbridge Township is one of thirteen townships in Greene County, Illinois, USA. As of the 2020 census, its population was 1,562 and it contained 715 housing units.

== Geography ==
According to the 2021 census gazetteer files, Rockbridge Township has a total area of 47.81 square miles (123.83 km^{2}), of which 47.69 square miles (123.52 km^{2}) (or 99.76%) is land and 0.12 square miles (0.31 km^{2}) (or 0.24%) is water.

=== Cities, towns, villages ===
- Greenfield (vast majority)
- Rockbridge

=== Unincorporated towns ===
- Fayette at 39.320047°N 90.153723°W

(This list is based on USGS data and may include former settlements.)

=== Cemeteries ===
The township contains these ten cemeteries: Cannedy, Freer, Hudson, Mitchell, Rives, Taylor Creek, Weisner, Whitlock, Witt and Witt Number 1.

=== Major highways ===
- Illinois Route 108
- Illinois Route 267

=== Airports and landing strips ===
- Sunset Landing Strip

== Demographics ==
As of the 2020 census there were 1,562 people, 653 households, and 459 families residing in the township. The population density was 32.67 inhabitants per square mile (12.61/km^{2}). There were 715 housing units at an average density of 14.96 per square mile (5.78/km^{2}). The racial makeup of the township was 96.73% White, 0.06% African American, 0.13% Native American, 0.00% Asian, 0.06% Pacific Islander, 0.32% from other races, and 2.69% from two or more races. Hispanic or Latino of any race were 0.58% of the population.

There were 653 households, out of which 42.00% had children under the age of 18 living with them, 52.53% were married couples living together, 8.58% had a female householder with no spouse present, and 29.71% were non-families. 26.60% of all households were made up of individuals, and 20.50% had someone living alone who was 65 years of age or older. The average household size was 3.06 and the average family size was 3.56.

The township's age distribution consisted of 27.7% under the age of 18, 7.0% from 18 to 24, 22.9% from 25 to 44, 25.9% from 45 to 64, and 16.8% who were 65 years of age or older. The median age was 39.2 years. For every 100 females, there were 72.9 males. For every 100 females age 18 and over, there were 80.8 males.

The median income for a household in the township was $55,197, and the median income for a family was $71,250. Males had a median income of $49,353 versus $24,228 for females. The per capita income for the township was $24,840. About 11.1% of families and 13.2% of the population were below the poverty line, including 24.3% of those under age 18 and 8.1% of those age 65 or over.

Historical population
Census	Pop.	Note	%±
2000	1,738		—
2010	1,633		−6.0%
2020	1,562		−4.3%
U.S. Decennial Census

== School districts ==
- Greenfield Community Unit School District 10

== Political districts ==
- Illinois' 19th congressional district
- State House District 97
- State Senate District 49
