= Greene County Courthouse (Illinois) =

Coordinates: 39°18′5″N 90°24′30″W

The Greene County Courthouse is the courthouse of Greene County, Illinois. Its court sessions hear cases in the 7th circuit of Illinois judicial district 4. The county courthouse is located at 519 North Main St. in the county seat of Carrollton. The courthouse is also the seat of Greene County government operations.

== History ==
Greene County was established by the laws of Illinois. In 1821, during a period of rapid Euro-American settlement of the Illinois River valley after the War of 1812, the newly organized (1818) state carved a new county out of a territorial super-county, Madison County. The earliest settlers chose a central point within the new county, a location which was platted and named Carollton, to be their county seat. In Carrollton, the county's citizens successively built three courthouses. The third courthouse, built in 1891−1892, is the Romanesque Revival and Second Empire structure in use today. It is faced with rough-cut stone, surmounted by a mansard roof and clock tower. The cost of the 1892-completed courthouse was $40,231 in the gold-coin money of the day. Earlier Greene County courthouse structures, which do not survive, were raised in 1821−1822 and 1830−1832.
