= Hall Township =

Hall Township may refer to the following townships in the United States:

- Hall Township, Bureau County, Illinois
- Hall Township, Dubois County, Indiana

== See also ==
- White Hall Township, Greene County, Illinois
