= Hillview, Illinois =

- Village
- Location of Hillview in Greene County, Illinois.
- Coordinates: 39°26′58″N 90°32′19″W
- Country: United States
- State: Illinois
- County: Greene
- Township: Patterson

Area
  - Total: 0.81 sq mi (2.11 km^{2})
  - Land: 0.81 sq mi (2.11 km^{2})
  - Water: 0 sq mi (0.00 km^{2})
- Elevation: 443 ft (135 m)

Population (2020)
  - Total: 94
  - Density: 115.2/sq mi (44.49/km^{2})
- Time zone: UTC-6 (CST)
  - Summer (DST): UTC-5 (CDT)
- ZIP code: 62050
- Area code: 217
- FIPS code: 17-35203
- GNIS feature ID: 2398511

Hillview is a village in Greene County, Illinois, United States. The population was 94 at the 2020 census.

== History ==
William Shelton, a ranger from Ft. Russell, Edwardsville, chose the alcove at the mouth of Hurricane Creek (creek at Eldred also called Hurricane), in 1826, to build a cabin. He left no record except Shelton's Hill, Shelton's Spring, and Shelton's Graveyard. A back water lake bore the name of another early settler, Bucks Lake, for Joseph Buck, 1825. Another family name is Bishop's Dell for James Bishop, 1830. The farm where Bishop's Dell was located is bordered on the south by Trimley creek and the barn that James Bishop constructed using wooden pegs still stands as well as the foundation of his one-room stone home built against the bluff. Seely and Hodges built a mill on the creek in 1833. W. D. Wells came from North Carolina in 1834 and planted a small apple orchard on his farm. Later the McClay Orchard became famous for its varieties of apples and methods in orchard management. When the Chicago and Alton Railroad connected with the Kansas City branch at Roodhouse, Hillview was a lumber camp called Happy Ville. This is the same on the Illinois Atlas map of Greene County, 1876. In 1893 Hapeville was replaced by with Pegram P.O. and was locally reoffered to as both Hapeville and Pegram. The village of Hillview was incorporated in 1903. It still remains the route of the Illinois Central Gulf West.

=== Indian history ===
In the 1980s, the Kampsville Archeological Center, located in Kampsville, Illinois, dug in the sand ridge area west of Hillview. Pottery, axes, grinding stones and arrowheads are not uncommon in this area, and it was theorized that the area was a factory for arrowheads at one time, without permanent settlement.

== Geography ==
Hillview is located in northwestern Greene County in the valley of Hurricane Creek where it enters the Illinois River bottomlands. Hillview is 12 miles (19 km) north (upriver) of Eldred and 8 miles (13 km) west of White Hall. Carrollton, the Greene County seat, is 18 miles (29 km) to the southeast.

According to the 2021 census gazetteer files, Hillview has a total area of 0.82 square miles (2.12 km^{2}), all land.

== Demographics ==
Historical population
Census	Pop.	Note	%±
1910	309		—
1920	577		86.7%
1930	442		−23.4%
1940	544		23.1%
1950	419		−23.0%
1960	305		−27.2%
1970	322		5.6%
1980	328		1.9%
1990	271		−17.4%
2000	179		−33.9%
2010	193		7.8%
2020	94		−51.3%
U.S. Decennial Census

As of the 2020 census there were 94 people, 46 households, and 34 families residing in the village. The population density was 115.20 inhabitants per square mile (44.48/km^{2}). There were 55 housing units at an average density of 67.40 per square mile (26.02/km^{2}). The racial makeup of the village was 97.87% White, 0.00% African American, 0.00% Native American, 0.00% Asian, 0.00% Pacific Islander, 0.00% from other races, and 2.13% from two or more races. Hispanic or Latino of any race were 0.00% of the population.

There were 46 households, out of which 28.3% had children under the age of 18 living with them, 54.35% were married couples living together, 8.70% had a female householder with no husband present, and 26.09% were non-families. 21.74% of all households were made up of individuals, and 4.35% had someone living alone who was 65 years of age or older. The average household size was 4.03 and the average family size was 3.50.

The village's age distribution consisted of 16.8% under the age of 18, 4.3% from 18 to 24, 42.2% from 25 to 44, 29.7% from 45 to 64, and 6.8% who were 65 years of age or older. The median age was 38.3 years. For every 100 females, there were 133.3 males. For every 100 females age 18 and over, there were 148.1 males.

The median income for a household in the village was $38,750, and the median income for a family was $42,500. Males had a median income of $32,083 versus $25,000 for females. The per capita income for the village was $14,020. About 20.6% of families and 37.3% of the population were below the poverty line, including 40.7% of those under age 18 and none of those age 65 or over.
