= Carrollton Township, Greene County, Illinois =

Carrollton Township
- Township
- Location in Greene County

- Greene County's location in Illinois
- Coordinates: 39°18′45″N 90°25′53″W
- Country: United States
- State: Illinois
- County: Greene
- Established: November 4, 1884

Area
  - Total: 44.54 sq mi (115.4 km^{2})
  - Land: 44.49 sq mi (115.2 km^{2})
  - Water: 0.05 sq mi (0.13 km^{2}) 0.11%
- Elevation: 574 ft (175 m)

Population (2020)
  - Total: 2,903
  - Density: 65.25/sq mi (25.19/km^{2})
- Time zone: UTC-6 (CST)
  - Summer (DST): UTC-5 (CDT)
- ZIP codes: 62016, 62092
- FIPS code: 17-061-11475

Carrollton Township is one of thirteen townships in Greene County, Illinois, USA. As of the 2020 census, its population was 2,903 and it contained 1,393 housing units.

== Geography ==
According to the 2021 census gazetteer files, Carrollton Township has a total area of 44.54 square miles (115.36 km^{2}), of which 44.49 square miles (115.23 km^{2}) (or 99.89%) is land and 0.05 square miles (0.13 km^{2}) (or 0.11%) is water.

=== Cities, towns, villages ===
- Carrollton

=== Unincorporated towns ===
- Berdan at 39.365047°N 90.395398°W
- Kaser at 39.299492°N 90.464287°W
- Pegram at 39.346436°N 90.397064°W

(This list is based on USGS data and may include former settlements.)

=== Cemeteries ===
The township contains these seven cemeteries: Berdan, Carter, Elm Dale, Hopewell, Pinkerton Number 1, Saint Johns Catholic and Smith.

=== Major highways ===
- U.S. Route 67
- Illinois Route 108

=== Airports and landing strips ===
- Boyd Hospital Heliport

=== Lakes ===
- Horseshoe Lake

=== Landmarks ===
- Fairgrounds
- Rainey Park

== Demographics ==
As of the 2020 census there were 2,903 people, 1,159 households, and 720 families residing in the township. The population density was 65.18 inhabitants per square mile (25.17/km^{2}). There were 1,393 housing units at an average density of 31.27 per square mile (12.07/km^{2}). The racial makeup of the township was 95.42% White, 0.38% African American, 0.07% Native American, 0.24% Asian, 0.00% Pacific Islander, 0.31% from other races, and 3.58% from two or more races. Hispanic or Latino of any race were 1.27% of the population.

There were 1,159 households, out of which 26.40% had children under the age of 18 living with them, 46.76% were married couples living together, 8.46% had a female householder with no spouse present, and 37.88% were non-families. 34.40% of all households were made up of individuals, and 13.90% had someone living alone who was 65 years of age or older. The average household size was 2.43 and the average family size was 3.03.

The township's age distribution consisted of 20.3% under the age of 18, 11.4% from 18 to 24, 25.3% from 25 to 44, 23.7% from 45 to 64, and 19.3% who were 65 years of age or older. The median age was 41.0 years. For every 100 females, there were 107.5 males. For every 100 females age 18 and over, there were 106.7 males.

The median income for a household in the township was $55,250, and the median income for a family was $67,500. Males had a median income of $43,322 versus $18,736 for females. The per capita income for the township was $30,167. About 6.8% of families and 10.6% of the population were below the poverty line, including 13.5% of those under age 18 and 3.7% of those age 65 or over.

Historical population
| Census | Pop. | Note | %± |
|---|---|---|---|
| 2000 | 3,157 | | — |
| 2010 | 2,966 | | −6.1% |
| 2020 | 2,903 | | −2.1% |
U.S. Decennial Census

== School districts ==
- Carrollton Community Unit School District 1

== Political districts ==
- Illinois' 19th congressional district
- State House District 97
- State Senate District 49
