= Barrow, Illinois =

- Unincorporated
- Location of Barrow within Illinois Barrow, Illinois (the United States)
- Coordinates: 39°30′22″N 90°24′05″W
- Country: United States
- State: Illinois
- County: Greene
- Township: Roodhouse
- Elevation: 653 ft (199 m)
- Time zone: UTC-6 (CST)
  - Summer (DST): UTC-5 (CDT)
- ZIP Code: 62082
- GNIS feature ID: 422440

Barrow is an unincorporated community located in Roodhouse Township, Greene County, Illinois, United States outside Roodhouse, just off Illinois Route 106.

== History ==
In March 2006, Barrow experienced an F1 tornado.

== Religion ==
Barrow Baptist Church is located in Barrow.
