= Walkerville Township, Greene County, Illinois =

Walkerville Township
- Township
- Location in Greene County

- Greene County's location in Illinois
- Coordinates: 39°23′30″N 90°33′01″W
- Country: United States
- State: Illinois
- County: Greene
- Established: November 4, 1884

Area
  - Total: 39.62 sq mi (102.6 km^{2})
  - Land: 39.00 sq mi (101.0 km^{2})
  - Water: 0.62 sq mi (1.6 km^{2}) 1.56%
- Elevation: 479 ft (146 m)

Population (2020)
  - Total: 188
  - Density: 4.82/sq mi (1.86/km^{2})
- Time zone: UTC-6 (CST)
  - Summer (DST): UTC-5 (CDT)
- ZIP codes: 62016, 62050, 62092
- FIPS code: 17-061-78461

Walkerville Township is one of thirteen townships in Greene County, Illinois, USA. As of the 2010 census, its population was 188 and it contained 84 housing units.

== Geography ==
According to the 2021 census gazetteer files, Walkerville Township has a total area of 39.62 square miles (102.62 km^{2}), of which 39.00 square miles (101.01 km^{2}) (or 98.44%) is land and 0.62 square miles (1.61 km^{2}) (or 1.56%) is water.

=== Unincorporated towns ===
- Haypress at 39.361437°N 90.534845°W
- Walkerville at 39.386992°N 90.495400°W

(This list is based on USGS data and may include former settlements.)

=== Cemeteries ===
The township contains these eight cemeteries: Bridgewater, Kinser, Likely, Parr, Rollins, Sweeten, Walkerville and William Wood.

=== Airports and landing strips ===
- Martin Airport
- Orton Landing Field

=== Rivers ===
- Illinois River

=== Lakes ===
- Brushy Lake

== Demographics ==
As of the 2020 census there were 188 people, 74 households, and 24 families residing in the township. The population density was 4.75 inhabitants per square mile (1.83/km^{2}). There were 84 housing units at an average density of 2.12 per square mile (0.82/km^{2}). The racial makeup of the township was 96.28% White, 0.00% African American, 0.00% Native American, 0.53% Asian, 0.00% Pacific Islander, 1.06% from other races, and 2.13% from two or more races. Hispanic or Latino of any race were 0.00% of the population.

There were 74 households, out of which none had children under the age of 18 living with them, 32.43% were married couples living together, none had a female householder with no spouse present, and 67.57% were non-families. 56.80% of all households were made up of individuals, and 50.00% had someone living alone who was 65 years of age or older. The average household size was 1.66 and the average family size was 2.33.

The township's age distribution consisted of 0.0% under the age of 18, 8.9% from 18 to 24, 24.4% from 25 to 44, 4.1% from 45 to 64, and 62.6% who were 65 years of age or older. The median age was 68.9 years. For every 100 females, there were 46.4 males. For every 100 females age 18 and over, there were 46.4 males.

The median income for a household in the township was $25,000. Males had a median income of $10,500 versus $23,015 for females. The per capita income for the township was $35,784. None of the population was below the poverty line.

Historical population
Census	Pop.	Note	%±
2000	227		—
2010	233		2.6%
2020	188		−19.3%
U.S. Decennial Census

== School districts ==
- Carrollton Community Unit School District 1
- North Greene Unit School District 3

== Political districts ==
- Illinois' 17th congressional district
- State House District 97
- State Senate District 49
