= Wrights Township, Greene County, Illinois =

Wrights Township
- Township
- Location in Greene County

- Greene County's location in Illinois
- Coordinates: 39°23′21″N 90°19′14″W
- Country: United States
- State: Illinois
- County: Greene
- Established: November 4, 1884

Area
  - Total: 35.93 sq mi (93.1 km^{2})
  - Land: 35.93 sq mi (93.1 km^{2})
  - Water: 0 sq mi (0 km^{2}) 0%
- Elevation: 515 ft (157 m)

Population (2020)
  - Total: 224
  - Density: 6.23/sq mi (2.41/km^{2})
- Time zone: UTC-6 (CST)
  - Summer (DST): UTC-5 (CDT)
- ZIP codes: 62016, 62044, 62082, 62092
- FIPS code: 17-061-83583

Wrights Township is one of thirteen townships in Greene County, Illinois, USA. As of the 2020 census, its population was 224 and it contained 119 housing units.

== Geography ==
According to the 2021 census gazetteer files, Wrights Township has a total area of 35.93 square miles (93.06 km^{2}), all land.

=== Unincorporated towns ===
- Wrights at 39.37588°N 90.294284°W

(This list is based on USGS data and may include former settlements.)

=== Cemeteries ===
The township contains Hickory Grove Cemetery.

== Demographics ==
As of the 2020 census there were 224 people, 68 households, and 43 families residing in the township. The population density was 6.23 inhabitants per square mile (2.41/km^{2}). There were 119 housing units at an average density of 3.31 per square mile (1.28/km^{2}). The racial makeup of the township was 99.11% White, 0.00% African American, 0.00% Native American, 0.00% Asian, 0.00% Pacific Islander, 0.00% from other races, and 0.89% from two or more races. Hispanic or Latino of any race were 0.00% of the population.

There were 68 households, out of which 26.50% had children under the age of 18 living with them, 63.24% were married couples living together, 0.00% had a female householder with no spouse present, and 36.76% were non-families. 27.90% of all households were made up of individuals, and 8.80% had someone living alone who was 65 years of age or older. The average household size was 3.31 and the average family size was 4.37.

The township's age distribution consisted of 16.0% under the age of 18, 0.0% from 18 to 24, 47.1% from 25 to 44, 20% from 45 to 64, and 16.9% who were 65 years of age or older. The median age was 38.4 years. For every 100 females, there were 155.7 males. For every 100 females age 18 and over, there were 162.5 males.

The median income for a household in the township was $108,125, and the median income for a family was $119,250. Males had a median income of $60,385 versus $30,982 for females. The per capita income for the township was $41,284. No families and 2.7% of the population were below the poverty line, including none of those under age 18 and none of those age 65 or over.

Historical population
Census	Pop.	Note	%±
2000	333		—
2010	314		−5.7%
2020	224		−28.7%
U.S. Decennial Census

== School districts ==
- Carrollton Community Unit School District 1
- Greenfield Community Unit School District 10
- North Greene Unit School District 3

== Political districts ==
- Illinois' 17th congressional district
- State House District 97
- State Senate District 49
