= Woodville Township, Greene County, Illinois =

Woodville Township
- Township
- Location in Greene County

- Greene County's location in Illinois
- Coordinates: 39°12′26″N 90°31′42″W
- Country: United States
- State: Illinois
- County: Greene
- Established: November 4, 1884

Area
  - Total: 48.34 sq mi (125.2 km^{2})
  - Land: 47.81 sq mi (123.8 km^{2})
  - Water: 0.83 sq mi (2.1 km^{2}) 1.72%
- Elevation: 460 ft (140 m)

Population (2020)
  - Total: 212
  - Density: 4.43/sq mi (1.71/km^{2})
- Time zone: UTC-6 (CST)
  - Summer (DST): UTC-5 (CDT)
- ZIP codes: 62016, 62027
- FIPS code: 17-061-83401

Woodville Township is one of thirteen townships in Greene County, Illinois, USA. As of the 2020 census, its population was 212 and it contained 108 housing units.

== Geography ==
According to the 2021 census gazetteer files, Woodville Township has a total area of 48.34 square miles (125.20 km^{2}), of which 47.51 square miles (123.05 km^{2}) (or 98.28%) is land and 0.83 square miles (2.15 km^{2}) (or 1.72%) is water.

=== Unincorporated towns ===
- Clark at 39.25977°N 90.577899°W
- East Hardin at 39.160048°N 90.609010°W
- King at 39.230881°N 90.579010°W
- Titus at 39.193381°N 90.578732°W

(This list is based on USGS data and may include former settlements.)

=== Cemeteries ===
The township contains these eleven cemeteries: Borlin, Busch, Clark, Cumming, Dayton, Fry, Maberry, Mills, Mount Gilead, Reynolds and Varble.

=== Major highways ===
- Illinois Route 16
- Illinois Route 100

=== Rivers ===
- Illinois River

== Demographics ==
As of the 2020 census there were 212 people, 44 households, and 34 families residing in the township. The population density was 4.39 inhabitants per square mile (1.69/km^{2}). There were 108 housing units at an average density of 2.23 per square mile (0.86/km^{2}). The racial makeup of the township was 95.75% White, 0.00% African American, 0.00% Native American, 0.00% Asian, 0.00% Pacific Islander, 1.42% from other races, and 2.83% from two or more races. Hispanic or Latino of any race were 1.42% of the population.

There were 44 households, out of which 25.00% had children under the age of 18 living with them, 52.27% were married couples living together, 25.00% had a female householder with no spouse present, and 22.73% were non-families. 22.70% of all households were made up of individuals, and 11.40% had someone living alone who was 65 years of age or older. The average household size was 2.05 and the average family size was 2.24.

The township's age distribution consisted of 21.1% under the age of 18, 5.6% from 18 to 24, 16.7% from 25 to 44, 41.1% from 45 to 64, and 15.6% who were 65 years of age or older. The median age was 51.1 years. For every 100 females, there were 66.7 males. For every 100 females age 18 and over, there were 73.2 males.

The median income for a household in the township was $67,857, and the median income for a family was $69,643. Males had a median income of $40,625 versus $31,406 for females. The per capita income for the township was $40,092. About 32.4% of families and 36.7% of the population were below the poverty line, including 100.0% of those under age 18 and none of those age 65 or over.

Historical population
Census	Pop.	Note	%±
2000	301		—
2010	239		−20.6%
2020	212		−11.3%
U.S. Decennial Census

== School districts ==
- Calhoun Community Unit School District 40
- Carrollton Community Unit School District 1

== Political districts ==
- Illinois' 17th congressional district
- State House District 97
- State Senate District 49
