= Athensville Township, Greene County, Illinois =

Athensville Township
- Township
- Location in Greene County

- Greene County's location in Illinois
- Coordinates: 39°28′54″N 90°12′20″W
- Country: United States
- State: Illinois
- County: Greene
- Established: November 4, 1884

Area
  - Total: 35.71 sq mi (92.5 km^{2})
  - Land: 35.70 sq mi (92.5 km^{2})
  - Water: 0.01 sq mi (0.026 km^{2}) 0.03%
- Elevation: 541 ft (165 m)

Population (2020)
  - Total: 292
  - Density: 8.18/sq mi (3.16/km^{2})
- Time zone: UTC-6 (CST)
  - Summer (DST): UTC-5 (CDT)
- ZIP codes: 62044, 62082
- FIPS code: 17-061-02700

Athensville Township is one of thirteen townships in Greene County, Illinois, USA. As of the 2020 census, its population was 292 and it contained 131 housing units.

== Geography ==
According to the 2021 census gazetteer files, Athensville Township has a total area of 35.71 square miles (92.49 km^{2}), of which 35.70 square miles (92.46 km^{2}) (or 99.97%) is land and 0.01 square miles (0.03 km^{2}) (or 0.03%) is water.

=== Unincorporated towns ===
- Athensville at 39.455603°N 90.189282°W

(This list is based on USGS data and may include former settlements.)

=== Cemeteries ===
The township contains these 10 cemeteries: Athensville, Barnett Number 1, Ceres, Jackson, Old Hopper Homestead, Reeve-Mayberry, Richwoods, Rhodes, Sheppard and Union Prather.

=== Major highways ===
- Illinois Route 267

== Demographics ==
As of the 2020 census there were 292 people, 95 households, and 55 families residing in the township. The population density was 8.18 inhabitants per square mile (3.16/km^{2}). There were 131 housing units at an average density of 3.67 per square mile (1.42/km^{2}). The racial makeup of the township was 96.58% White, 0.68% African American, 0.00% Native American, 0.00% Asian, 0.00% Pacific Islander, 0.34% from other races, and 2.40% from two or more races. Hispanic or Latino of any race were 1.03% of the population.

There were 95 households, out of which 13.70% had children under the age of 18 living with them, 48.42% were married couples living together, 0.00% had a female householder with no spouse present, and 42.11% were non-families. 35.80% of all households were made up of individuals, and 10.50% had someone living alone who was 65 years of age or older. The average household size was 2.31 and the average family size was 3.13.

The township's age distribution consisted of 9.1% under the age of 18, 0.0% from 18 to 24, 18.3% from 25 to 44, 34.2% from 45 to 64, and 38.4% who were 65 years of age or older. The median age was 60.0 years. For every 100 females, there were 157.6 males. For every 100 females age 18 and over, there were 172.6 males.

The median income for a household in the township was $60,078, and the median income for a family was $61,641. Males had a median income of $31,944 versus $31,250 for females. The per capita income for the township was $32,614. None of the population was below the poverty line.

Historical population
Census	Pop.	Note	%±
2000	395		—
2010	343		−13.2%
2020	292		−14.9%
U.S. Decennial Census

== School districts ==
- Franklin Community Unit School District 1
- Greenfield Community Unit School District 10
- North Greene Unit School District 3

== Political districts ==
- Illinois' 17th congressional district
- State House District 97
- State Senate District 49
