= Roy V. Scott =

American historian

- Born: Roy Vernon Scott; December 26, 1927; Wrights, Illinois, U.S.
- Died: August 24, 2021 (aged 93)
- Education: Iowa State University; University of Illinois Urbana-Champaign
- Occupation: Historian
- Spouse: Jane Angeline Brayford (m. 1959; died. 2018)

Roy Vernon Scott (December 26, 1927 – August 24, 2021) was an American historian.

== Life and career ==
Scott was born in Wrights, Illinois, the son of Roy Scott and Edna Dodson. He attended and graduated from Greenfield High School. After graduating, he served in the United States Air Force, which after his discharge, he attended Iowa State University, earning his BS degree in 1952. He also attended the University of Illinois Urbana-Champaign, earning his MS degree in 1953 and his PhD degree in 1957.

Scott served as a professor in the department of history at Mississippi State University from 1960 to 1998. During his years as a professor, in 1978, he was named the William L. Giles Distinguished Professor of History, and from 1989 to 1990, he served as president of the Mississippi Historical Society.

== Personal life and death ==
In 1959, Scott married Jane Angeline Brayford. Their marriage lasted until her death in 2018.

Scott died on August 24, 2021, at the age of 93.
