= Rubicon Township, Greene County, Illinois =

Rubicon Township
- Township
- Location in Greene County

- Greene County's location in Illinois
- Coordinates: 39°23′49″N 90°12′27″W
- Country: United States
- State: Illinois
- County: Greene
- Established: November 4, 1884

Area
  - Total: 35.75 sq mi (92.6 km^{2})
  - Land: 35.67 sq mi (92.4 km^{2})
  - Water: 0.08 sq mi (0.21 km^{2}) 0.23%
- Elevation: 607 ft (185 m)

Population (2020)
  - Total: 272
  - Density: 7.63/sq mi (2.94/km^{2})
- Time zone: UTC-6 (CST)
  - Summer (DST): UTC-5 (CDT)
- ZIP code: 62044
- FIPS code: 17-061-66235

Rubicon Township is one of thirteen townships in Greene County, Illinois, USA. As of the 2020 census, its population was 272 and it contained 138 housing units.

== Geography ==
According to the 2021 census gazetteer files, Rubicon Township has a total area of 35.75 square miles (92.59 km^{2}), of which 35.67 square miles (92.38 km^{2}) (or 99.77%) is land and 0.08 square miles (0.21 km^{2}) (or 0.23%) is water.

=== Cities, towns, villages ===
- Greenfield (north edge)

=== Cemeteries ===
The township contains these eight cemeteries: Crawford, Drake-Million, Hermitage, Oakwood, Rose Hill West, Rubican, Short and Vandaveer.

=== Major highways ===
- Illinois Route 267

=== Airports and landing strips ===
- Tiger Landing Strip

=== Landmarks ===
- Lions Park

== Demographics ==
As of the 2020 census there were 272 people, 166 households, and 111 families residing in the township. The population density was 7.61 inhabitants per square mile (2.94/km^{2}). There were 138 housing units at an average density of 3.86 per square mile (1.49/km^{2}). The racial makeup of the township was 97.79% White, 0.37% African American, 0.00% Native American, 0.00% Asian, 0.00% Pacific Islander, 0.00% from other races, and 1.84% from two or more races. Hispanic or Latino of any race were 0.37% of the population.

There were 166 households, out of which 19.90% had children under the age of 18 living with them, 66.87% were married couples living together, 0.00% had a female householder with no spouse present, and 33.13% were non-families. 29.50% of all households were made up of individuals, and 13.90% had someone living alone who was 65 years of age or older. The average household size was 2.51 and the average family size was 3.21.

The township's age distribution consisted of 16.8% under the age of 18, 3.8% from 18 to 24, 23.6% from 25 to 44, 29.9% from 45 to 64, and 26.0% who were 65 years of age or older. The median age was 47.8 years. For every 100 females, there were 111.2 males. For every 100 females age 18 and over, there were 104.7 males.

The median income for a household in the township was $67,083. Males had a median income of $56,563 versus $33,147 for females. The per capita income for the township was $35,149. About 24.3% of families and 28.4% of the population were below the poverty line, including 81.4% of those under age 18 and none of those age 65 or over.

Historical population
Census	Pop.	Note	%±
2000	363		—
2010	345		−5.0%
2020	272		−21.2%
U.S. Decennial Census

== School districts ==
- Greenfield Community Unit School District 10

== Political districts ==
- Illinois's 17th congressional district
- State House District 97
- State Senate District 49
