= Wilmington, Greene County, Illinois =

- Village
- Location in Greene County and the state of Illinois.
- Coordinates: 39°28′57″N 90°29′23″W
- Country: United States
- State: Illinois
- County: Greene
- Township: Patterson

Area
  - Total: 0.79 sq mi (2.04 km^{2})
  - Land: 0.79 sq mi (2.04 km^{2})
  - Water: 0 sq mi (0.00 km^{2})
- Elevation: 679 ft (207 m)

Population (2020)
  - Total: 91
  - Density: 115.7/sq mi (44.68/km^{2})
- Time zone: Central
- ZIP code(s): 62078
- Area code(s): 217
- FIPS code: 17-82088
- GNIS feature ID: 2399705

Wilmington (Patterson) is a village in Greene County, Illinois, United States. The population was 91 at the 2020 census.

== Geography ==
Wilmington is located in northwestern Greene County. It is 7 miles (11 km) northwest of White Hall and 16 miles (26 km) northwest of Carrollton, the Greene County seat.

According to the 2021 census gazetteer files, Wilmington has a total area of 0.79 square miles (2.05 km^{2}), all land.

== Demographics ==
Historical population
Census	Pop.	Note	%±
1900	213		—
1910	204		−4.2%
1920	228		11.8%
1930	199		−12.7%
1940	201		1.0%
1950	147		−26.9%
1960	130		−11.6%
1970	141		8.5%
1980	185		31.2%
1990	129		−30.3%
2000	120		−7.0%
2010	142		18.3%
2020	91		−35.9%
U.S. Decennial Census

As of the 2020 census there were 91 people, 43 households, and 34 families residing in the village. The population density was 115.78 inhabitants per square mile (44.70/km^{2}). There were 47 housing units at an average density of 59.80 per square mile (23.09/km^{2}). The racial makeup of the village was 95.60% White, 0.00% African American, 0.00% Native American, 0.00% Asian, 0.00% Pacific Islander, 0.00% from other races, and 4.40% from two or more races. Hispanic or Latino of any race were 0.00% of the population.

There were 43 households, out of which 25.6% had children under the age of 18 living with them, 60.47% were married couples living together, 13.95% had a female householder with no husband present, and 20.93% were non-families. 20.93% of all households were made up of individuals, and 4.65% had someone living alone who was 65 years of age or older. The average household size was 3.35 and the average family size was 3.00.

The village's age distribution consisted of 18.6% under the age of 18, 7.0% from 18 to 24, 12.5% from 25 to 44, 38.1% from 45 to 64, and 24.0% who were 65 years of age or older. The median age was 50.3 years. For every 100 females, there were 72.0 males. For every 100 females age 18 and over, there were 64.1 males.

The median income for a household in the village was $39,531, and the median income for a family was $53,750. Males had a median income of $41,250 versus $25,769 for females. The per capita income for the village was $21,094. About 2.9% of families and 13.2% of the population were below the poverty line, including 4.2% of those under age 18 and none of those age 65 or over.
