= James John Eldred House =

Historic house in Illinois, United States

- U.S. National Register of Historic Places
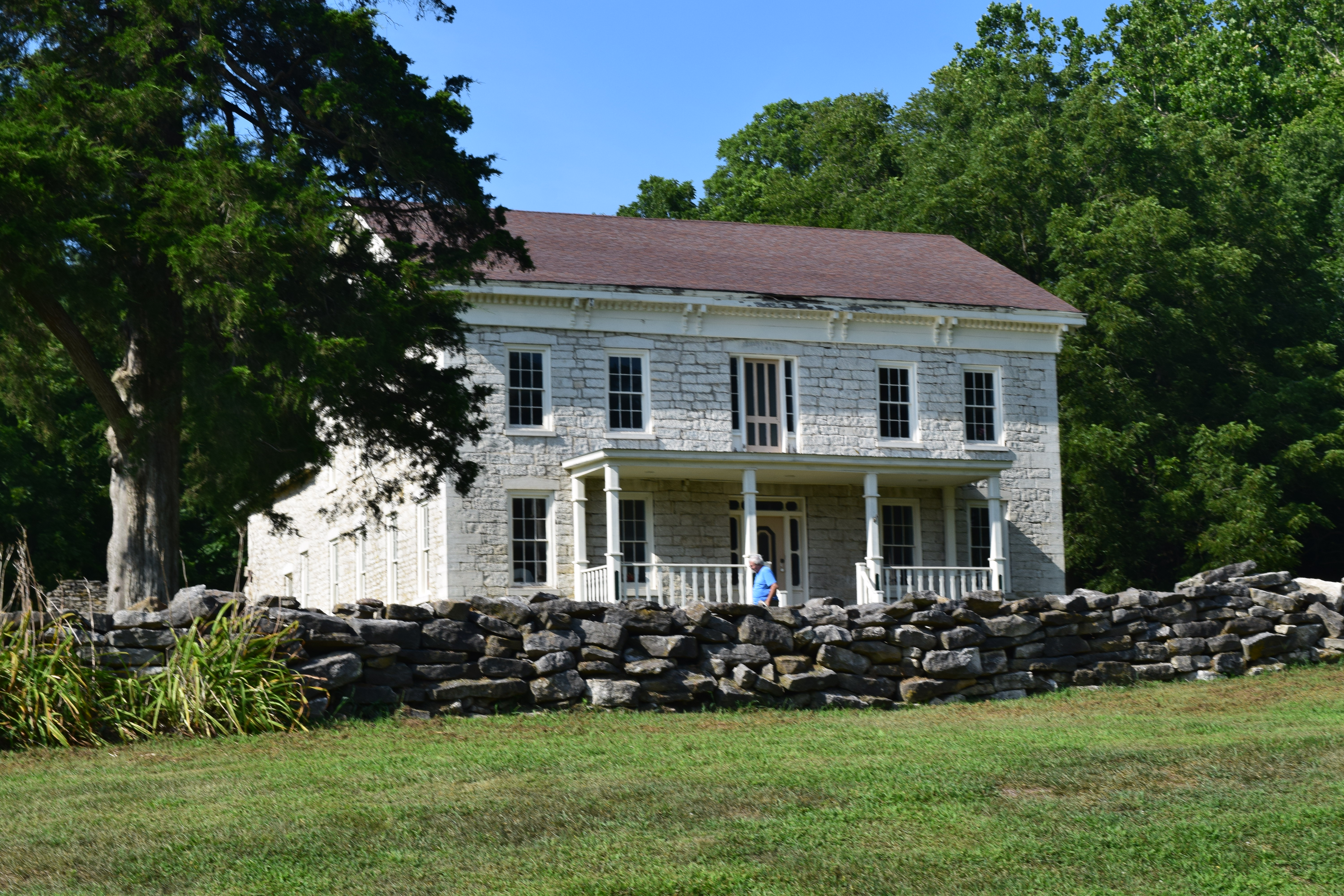

- Location within Illinois Location within the United States
- Nearest city: Eldred, Illinois
- Coordinates: 39°18′29″N 90°32′55″W
- Area: 1.2 acres (0.49 ha)
- Architectural style: Greek Revival, Italianate
- NRHP reference No.: 99000732
- Added to NRHP: June 25, 1999

The James John Eldred House is a historic house located in Bluffdale Township near Eldred, Illinois. The house was built in 1861 by James J. Eldred, who lived in the home with his family until 1901. The house was designed in the Greek Revival style and also includes features of the Italianate style. The front of the house has five symmetrical bays and a front porch. The main entry, located in the porch, is bordered by sidelights and a transom. The house's cornice features Greek Revival dentils and pediments and Italianate bracketing. Palladian windows are located on the house's east and west sides. Many of the interior details of the house are original, including its fireplace mantels and much of its woodwork.

The house was added to the National Register of Historic Places on June 25, 1999.
