= David M. Woodson =

American judge

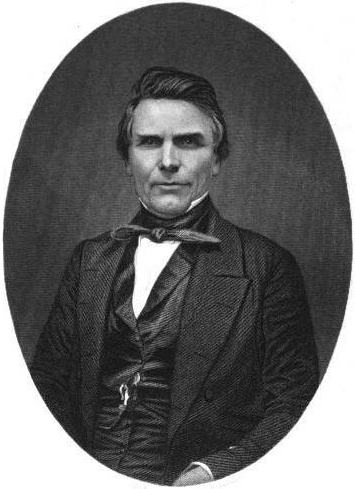
David M. Woodson

David Meade Woodson (May 18, 1806 – August 26, 1877) was an American jurist and legislator.

== Biography ==
Born in Jessamine County, Kentucky, Woodson received his bachelor's degree from Transylvania University. He served in the Kentucky House of Representatives in 1832 as a Whig. In 1834, Woodson moved to Greene County, Illinois and served as state's attorney for Greene County. From 1840 to 1842 and from 1869 to 1870, Woodson served in the Illinois House of Representatives as a Whig and later as a Democrat. He served in the 1847 Illinois Constitutional Convention. Then, in 1848, Woodson served on the Illinois Supreme Court for one month. From 1848 to 1867, Woodson served as an Illinois Circuit Court judge. He then practiced law in Carrollton, Illinois, Woodson died in Carrollton, Illinois.
