= Roodhouse Township, Greene County, Illinois =

Roodhouse Township
- Township
- Location in Greene County

- Greene County's location in Illinois
- Coordinates: 39°29′42″N 90°21′11″W
- Country: United States
- State: Illinois
- County: Greene
- Established: November 4, 1884

Area
  - Total: 39.69 sq mi (102.8 km^{2})
  - Land: 39.65 sq mi (102.7 km^{2})
  - Water: 0.04 sq mi (0.10 km^{2}) 0.11%
- Elevation: 650 ft (198 m)

Population (2020)
  - Total: 1,869
  - Density: 47.14/sq mi (18.20/km^{2})
- Time zone: UTC-6 (CST)
  - Summer (DST): UTC-5 (CDT)
- ZIP codes: 62082, 62092
- FIPS code: 17-061-65494

Roodhouse Township is one of thirteen townships in Greene County, Illinois, USA. As of the 2020 census, its population was 1,869 and it contained 939 housing units.

== Geography ==
According to the 2021 census gazetteer files, Roodhouse Township has a total area of 39.69 square miles (102.80 km^{2}), of which 39.65 square miles (102.69 km^{2}) (or 99.89%) is land and 0.04 square miles (0.10 km^{2}) (or 0.11%) is water.

=== Cities, towns, villages ===
- Roodhouse

=== Unincorporated towns ===
- Barrow at 39.506159°N 90.401512°W

(This list is based on USGS data and may include former settlements.)

=== Cemeteries ===
The township contains these six cemeteries: Ferwood, Martins Prairie, Thompson, Tunnison, Williams-Edwards and Williams-Edwards.

=== Major highways ===
- U.S. Route 67
- Illinois Route 106

=== Landmarks ===
- American Legion Park

== Demographics ==
As of the 2020 census there were 1,869 people, 846 households, and 611 families residing in the township. The population density was 47.09 inhabitants per square mile (18.18/km^{2}). There were 939 housing units at an average density of 23.66 per square mile (9.14/km^{2}). The racial makeup of the township was 94.70% White, 0.11% African American, 0.00% Native American, 0.11% Asian, 0.00% Pacific Islander, 0.37% from other races, and 4.71% from two or more races. Hispanic or Latino of any race were 1.12% of the population.

There were 846 households, out of which 25.30% had children under the age of 18 living with them, 51.77% were married couples living together, 11.35% had a female householder with no spouse present, and 27.78% were non-families. 25.90% of all households were made up of individuals, and 9.30% had someone living alone who was 65 years of age or older. The average household size was 2.39 and the average family size was 2.82.

The township's age distribution consisted of 22.6% under the age of 18, 7.3% from 18 to 24, 21.9% from 25 to 44, 29.6% from 45 to 64, and 18.5% who were 65 years of age or older. The median age was 41.7 years. For every 100 females, there were 112.4 males. For every 100 females age 18 and over, there were 107.3 males.

The median income for a household in the township was $44,518, and the median income for a family was $55,292. Males had a median income of $33,472 versus $27,375 for females. The per capita income for the township was $23,117. About 14.1% of families and 21.7% of the population were below the poverty line, including 29.7% of those under age 18 and 8.0% of those age 65 or over.

Historical population
Census	Pop.	Note	%±
2000	2,570		—
2010	2,241		−12.8%
2020	1,869		−16.6%
U.S. Decennial Census

== School districts ==
- North Greene Unit School District 3
- Winchester Community Unit School District 1

== Political districts ==
- Illinois's 17th congressional district
- State House District 97
- State Senate District 49
