= Patterson Township, Greene County, Illinois =

Patterson Township
- Township
- Location in Greene County

- Greene County's location in Illinois
- Coordinates: 39°28′57″N 90°31′40″W
- Country: United States
- State: Illinois
- County: Greene
- Established: November 4, 1884

Area
  - Total: 47.64 sq mi (123.4 km^{2})
  - Land: 47.10 sq mi (122.0 km^{2})
  - Water: 0.54 sq mi (1.4 km^{2}) 1.14%
- Elevation: 433 ft (132 m)

Population (2020)
  - Total: 404
  - Density: 8.58/sq mi (3.31/km^{2})
- Time zone: UTC-6 (CST)
  - Summer (DST): UTC-5 (CDT)
- ZIP codes: 62050, 62078, 62082, 62092
- FIPS code: 17-061-58096

Patterson Township is one of thirteen townships in Greene County, Illinois, USA. As of the 2020 census, its population was 404 and it contained 213 housing units.

== Geography ==
According to the 2021 census gazetteer files, Patterson Township has a total area of 47.64 square miles (123.39 km^{2}), of which 47.10 square miles (121.99 km^{2}) (or 98.86%) is land and 0.54 square miles (1.40 km^{2}) (or 1.14%) is water.

=== Cities, towns, villages ===
- Hillview
- Wilmington

=== Unincorporated towns ===
- Grand Pass at 39.457826°N 90.596236°W
- Hanks Station at 39.458937°N 90.470679°W
- McClay Orchard at 39.466715°N 90.525125°W
- Patterson at 39.480603°N 90.482902°W

(This list is based on USGS data and may include former settlements.)

=== Cemeteries ===
The township contains these eight cemeteries: Bluefield, Hanks, Johnson Burial Ground, Pinetree, Rawlins, Shelton, Smith and Wilmington.

=== Airports and landing strips ===
- Hartwell Ranch RLA Airport

=== Rivers ===
- Illinois River

== Demographics ==
As of the 2020 census there were 404 people, 184 households, and 155 families residing in the township. The population density was 8.48 inhabitants per square mile (3.27/km^{2}). There were 213 housing units at an average density of 4.47 per square mile (1.73/km^{2}). The racial makeup of the township was 95.30% White, 0.25% African American, 0.50% Native American, 0.25% Asian, 0.00% Pacific Islander, 0.74% from other races, and 2.97% from two or more races. Hispanic or Latino of any race were 0.50% of the population.

There were 184 households, out of which 25.00% had children under the age of 18 living with them, 75.00% were married couples living together, 5.43% had a female householder with no spouse present, and 15.76% were non-families. 14.70% of all households were made up of individuals, and 4.90% had someone living alone who was 65 years of age or older. The average household size was 3.16 and the average family size was 3.45.

The township's age distribution consisted of 17.2% under the age of 18, 6.0% from 18 to 24, 25.7% from 25 to 44, 36.3% from 45 to 64, and 14.6% who were 65 years of age or older. The median age was 47.3 years. For every 100 females, there were 75.5 males. For every 100 females age 18 and over, there were 76.2 males.

The median income for a household in the township was $67,841, and the median income for a family was $69,261. Males had a median income of $32,222 versus $25,728 for females. The per capita income for the township was $20,336. About 10.3% of families and 19.4% of the population were below the poverty line, including 29.0% of those under age 18 and 0.0% of those age 65 or over.

Historical population
Census	Pop.	Note	%±
2000	643		—
2010	636		−1.1%
2020	404		−36.5%
U.S. Decennial Census

== School districts ==
- North Greene Unit School District 3

== Political districts ==
- Illinois's 15th congressional district
- State House District 97
- State Senate District 49
