= South Jacksonville, Illinois =

- Village
- Location in Morgan County, Illinois
- Coordinates: 39°42′09″N 90°13′45″W
- Country: United States
- State: Illinois
- County: Morgan

Area
  - Total: 2.32 sq mi (6.02 km^{2})
  - Land: 2.27 sq mi (5.89 km^{2})
  - Water: 0.054 sq mi (0.14 km^{2})
- Elevation: 607 ft (185 m)

Population (2020)
  - Total: 3,302
  - Density: 1,453.0/sq mi (560.99/km^{2})
- Time zone: UTC-6 (CST)
  - Summer (DST): UTC-5 (CDT)
- ZIP code: 62650
- Area code: 217
- FIPS code: 17-70889
- GNIS feature ID: 2399850
- Website: southjacksonville-il.gov

South Jacksonville is a village in Morgan County, Illinois, United States. The population was 3,302 at the 2020 census. It is part of the Jacksonville Micropolitan Statistical Area.

== Geography ==
South Jacksonville is in central Morgan County and is bordered to the north by the city of Jacksonville, the county seat. Illinois Route 267 (Main Street) runs through the village center, leading north as Jacksonville's Main Street 2 miles (3 km) to the city center and south 6 miles (10 km) to Woodson. The Interstate 72/U.S. Route 36 freeway runs along the southern edge of the village, with access from Exit 64 (IL 267). I-72/US-36 leads east 35 miles (56 km) to Springfield, the state capital, and west 64 miles (103 km) to Hannibal, Missouri.

According to the U.S. Census Bureau, South Jacksonville has a total area of 2.32 square miles (6.01 km^{2}), of which 0.05 square miles (0.13 km^{2}), or 2.29%, are water. Mauvaise Terre Creek flows northward through the east side of the village, passing through Mauvaise Terre Lake, a reservoir. The creek is a tributary of the Illinois River.

== Demographics ==
Historical population
Census	Pop.	Note	%±
1920	435		—
1930	562		29.2%
1940	797		41.8%
1950	1,165		46.2%
1960	2,340		100.9%
1970	2,950		26.1%
1980	3,382		14.6%
1990	3,187		−5.8%
2000	3,475		9.0%
2010	3,331		−4.1%
2020	3,302		−0.9%
U.S. Decennial Census

=== 2020 census ===
As of the 2020 census, South Jacksonville had a population of 3,302. The median age was 45.3 years. 18.8% of residents were under the age of 18 and 25.3% of residents were 65 years of age or older. For every 100 females there were 87.3 males, and for every 100 females age 18 and over there were 82.5 males age 18 and over.

100.0% of residents lived in urban areas, while 0.0% lived in rural areas.

There were 1,618 households in South Jacksonville, of which 23.3% had children under the age of 18 living in them. Of all households, 39.2% were married-couple households, 18.0% were households with a male householder and no spouse or partner present, and 34.9% were households with a female householder and no spouse or partner present. About 38.0% of all households were made up of individuals and 18.8% had someone living alone who was 65 years of age or older.

There were 1,692 housing units, of which 4.4% were vacant. The homeowner vacancy rate was 2.0% and the rental vacancy rate was 5.3%.

Racial composition as of the 2020 census
Race	Number	Percent
White	3,000	90.9%
Black or African American	80	2.4%
American Indian and Alaska Native	7	0.2%
Asian	20	0.6%
Native Hawaiian and Other Pacific Islander	0	0.0%
Some other race	37	1.1%
Two or more races	158	4.8%
Hispanic or Latino (of any race)	84	2.5%

=== 2000 census ===
As of the 2000 census, there were 3,475 people, 1,584 households, and 982 families residing in the village. The population density was 2,102.3 inhabitants per square mile (811.7/km^{2}). There were 1,648 housing units at an average density of 997.0 per square mile (384.9/km^{2}). The racial makeup of the village was 97.32% White, 1.04% African American, 0.17% Native American, 0.66% Asian, 0.20% from other races, and 0.60% from two or more races. Hispanic or Latino of any race were 0.75% of the population.

There were 1,584 households, out of which 25.4% had children under the age of 18 living with them, 50.2% were married couples living together, 9.0% had a female householder with no husband present, and 38.0% were non-families. 34.2% of all households were made up of individuals, and 20.4% had someone living alone who was 65 years of age or older. The average household size was 2.18 and the average family size was 2.81.

In the village, the population was spread out, with 20.4% under the age of 18, 7.2% from 18 to 24, 25.2% from 25 to 44, 25.7% from 45 to 64, and 21.5% who were 65 years of age or older. The median age was 43 years. For every 100 females, there were 81.7 males. For every 100 females age 18 and over, there were 78.6 males.

The median income for a household in the village was $37,548, and the median income for a family was $46,373. Males had a median income of $31,827 versus $26,750 for females. The per capita income for the village was $20,973. About 3.8% of families and 6.5% of the population were below the poverty line, including 8.8% of those under age 18 and 8.9% of those age 65 or over.

== Tourism ==
The Prairie Land Heritage Museum in the northwest corner of the village is an open-air museum centered around traditional farming methods and antique machinery. One notable attraction at the museum is its 2 ft (610 mm) narrow gauge George Waters Memorial Railroad, powered by a real steam locomotive built by Crown Metal Products.
