= Linder Township, Greene County, Illinois =

Linder Township
- Township
- Location in Greene County

- Greene County's location in Illinois
- Coordinates: 39°17′57″N 90°18′44″W
- Country: United States
- State: Illinois
- County: Greene
- Established: November 4, 1884

Area
  - Total: 34.60 sq mi (89.6 km^{2})
  - Land: 34.58 sq mi (89.6 km^{2})
  - Water: 0.02 sq mi (0.052 km^{2}) 0.05%
- Elevation: 597 ft (182 m)

Population (2020)
  - Total: 295
  - Density: 8.53/sq mi (3.29/km^{2})
- Time zone: UTC-6 (CST)
  - Summer (DST): UTC-5 (CDT)
- ZIP codes: 62016, 62044, 62081
- FIPS code: 17-061-43809

Linder Township is one of thirteen townships in Greene County, Illinois, USA. As of the 2020 census, its population was 295 and it contained 132 housing units.

== Geography ==
According to the 2021 census gazetteer files, Linder Township has a total area of 34.60 square miles (89.61 km^{2}), of which 34.58 square miles (89.56 km^{2}) (or 99.95%) is land and 0.02 square miles (0.05 km^{2}) (or 0.05%) is water.

=== Unincorporated towns ===
- Baum at 39.327547°N 90.315673°W
- Kahm at 39.327824°N 90.260949°W

(This list is based on USGS data and may include former settlements.)

=== Cemeteries ===
The township contains these two cemeteries: Hardcastle and Hardin.

=== Major highways ===
- Illinois Route 108

== Demographics ==
As of the 2020 census there were 295 people, 159 households, and 110 families residing in the township. The population density was 8.53 inhabitants per square mile (3.29/km^{2}). There were 132 housing units at an average density of 3.82 per square mile (1.47/km^{2}). The racial makeup of the township was 97.29% White, 0.00% African American, 0.00% Native American, 0.00% Asian, 0.00% Pacific Islander, 0.00% from other races, and 2.71% from two or more races. Hispanic or Latino of any race were 2.37% of the population.

There were 159 households, out of which 28.30% had children under the age of 18 living with them, 69.18% were married couples living together, none had a female householder with no spouse present, and 30.82% were non-families. 23.90% of all households were made up of individuals, and 11.30% had someone living alone who was 65 years of age or older. The average household size was 2.13 and the average family size was 2.56.

The township's age distribution consisted of 20.9% under the age of 18, 4.1% from 18 to 24, 19.5% from 25 to 44, 29.8% from 45 to 64, and 25.7% who were 65 years of age or older. The median age was 49.5 years. For every 100 females, there were 121.6 males. For every 100 females age 18 and over, there were 112.7 males.

The median income for a family was $89,063. Males had a median income of $59,063 versus $34,722 for females. The per capita income for the township was $40,510. None of the population was below the poverty line.

Historical population
Census	Pop.	Note	%±
2000	319		—
2010	345		8.2%
2020	295		−14.5%
U.S. Decennial Census

== School districts ==
- Carrollton Community Unit School District 1
- Greenfield Community Unit School District 10

== Political districts ==
- Illinois' 19th congressional district
- State House District 97
- State Senate District 49
