= Bluffdale Township, Greene County, Illinois =

Bluffdale Township
- Township
- Location in Greene County

- Greene County's location in Illinois
- Coordinates: 39°18′49″N 90°33′05″W
- Country: United States
- State: Illinois
- County: Greene
- Established: November 4, 1884

Area
  - Total: 45.58 sq mi (118.1 km^{2})
  - Land: 44.77 sq mi (116.0 km^{2})
  - Water: 0.81 sq mi (2.1 km^{2}) 1.79%
- Elevation: 443 ft (135 m)

Population (2020)
  - Total: 454
  - Density: 10.1/sq mi (3.92/km^{2})
- Time zone: UTC-6 (CST)
  - Summer (DST): UTC-5 (CDT)
- ZIP codes: 62016, 62027, 62050, 62092
- FIPS code: 17-061-06860

Bluffdale Township is one of thirteen townships in Greene County, Illinois, USA. As of the 2020 census, its population was 454 and it contained 241 housing units.

== Geography ==
According to the 2021 census gazetteer files, Bluffdale Township has a total area of 45.58 square miles (118.05 km^{2}), of which 44.77 square miles (115.95 km^{2}) (or 98.21%) is land and 0.81 square miles (2.10 km^{2}) (or 1.79%) is water.

=== Cities, towns, villages ===
- Eldred

=== Unincorporated towns ===
- Boyle at 39.283381°N 90.577344°W
- Woody at 39.263658°N 90.48512°W

(This list is based on USGS data and may include former settlements.)

=== Extinct towns ===
- Columbiana at 39.29727°N 90.600400°W
- Hurricane at 39.291714°N 90.490121°W

(These towns are listed as "historical" by the USGS.)

=== Cemeteries ===
The township contains these four cemeteries: Eldred, Eldred Memorial Gardens, Mulberry and Richwoods West.

=== Major highways ===
- Illinois Route 108

=== Airports and landing strips ===
- Herschberger Landing Strip
- The Adwell Corporation Airport

=== Rivers ===
- Illinois River

== Demographics ==
As of the 2020 census there were 454 people, 290 households, and 210 families residing in the township. The population density was 9.96 inhabitants per square mile (3.85/km^{2}). There were 241 housing units at an average density of 5.29 per square mile (2.04/km^{2}). The racial makeup of the township was 96.48% White, 0.00% African American, 0.00% Native American, 0.22% Asian, 0.00% Pacific Islander, 1.10% from other races, and 2.20% from two or more races. Hispanic or Latino of any race were 0.44% of the population.

There were 290 households, out of which 20.00% had children under the age of 18 living with them, 63.45% were married couples living together, 5.52% had a female householder with no spouse present, and 27.59% were non-families. 25.20% of all households were made up of individuals, and 21.00% had someone living alone who was 65 years of age or older. The average household size was 2.48 and the average family size was 3.02.

The township's age distribution consisted of 14.0% under the age of 18, 10.4% from 18 to 24, 19.2% from 25 to 44, 35.6% from 45 to 64, and 20.7% who were 65 years of age or older. The median age was 48.0 years. For every 100 females, there were 110.2 males. For every 100 females age 18 and over, there were 104.0 males.

The median income for a household in the township was $81,000, and the median income for a family was $94,375. Males had a median income of $46,029 versus $23,571 for females. The per capita income for the township was $38,931. About 1.0% of families and 2.8% of the population were below the poverty line, including none of those under age 18 and 7.4% of those age 65 or over.

Historical population
Census	Pop.	Note	%±
2000	563		—
2010	556		−1.2%
2020	454		−18.3%
U.S. Decennial Census

== School districts ==
- Carrollton Community Unit School District 1

== Political districts ==
- Illinois' 17th congressional district
- State House District 97
- State Senate District 49
