= White Hall Township, Greene County, Illinois =

White Hall Township
- Township
- Location in Greene County

- Greene County's location in Illinois
- Coordinates: 39°25′21″N 90°23′45″W
- Country: United States
- State: Illinois
- County: Greene
- Established: November 4, 1884

Area
  - Total: 42.13 sq mi (109.1 km^{2})
  - Land: 42.04 sq mi (108.9 km^{2})
  - Water: 0.09 sq mi (0.23 km^{2}) 0.22%
- Elevation: 538 ft (164 m)

Population (2020)
  - Total: 2,552
  - Density: 60.70/sq mi (23.44/km^{2})
- Time zone: UTC-6 (CST)
  - Summer (DST): UTC-5 (CDT)
- ZIP codes: 62016, 62044, 62082, 62092
- FIPS code: 17-061-81269

White Hall Township is one of thirteen townships in Greene County, Illinois, USA. As of the 2020 census, its population was 2,552 and it contained 1,199 housing units.

== Geography ==
According to the 2021 census gazetteer files, White Hall Township has a total area of 42.13 square miles (109.12 km^{2}), of which 42.04 square miles (108.88 km^{2}) (or 99.78%) is land and 0.09 square miles (0.23 km^{2}) (or 0.22%) is water.

=== Cities, towns, villages ===
- White Hall

=== Unincorporated towns ===
- Belltown at 39.3825472°N 90.4078983°W

(This list is based on USGS data and may include former settlements.)

=== Cemeteries ===
The township contains these nine cemeteries: Belltown, Henderson, Hicks, Highstreet, Jones, North, Sanders, Veterans of Foreign Wars Memorial and White Hall.

=== Major highways ===
- U.S. Route 67
- Illinois Route 106

=== Landmarks ===
- Conrad Park Street
- Lions Park

== Demographics ==
As of the 2020 census there were 2,552 people, 1,034 households, and 639 families residing in the township. The population density was 60.57 inhabitants per square mile (23.39/km^{2}). There were 1,199 housing units at an average density of 28.46 per square mile (10.99/km^{2}). The racial makeup of the township was 95.85% White, 0.16% African American, 0.12% Native American, 0.35% Asian, 0.08% Pacific Islander, 0.04% from other races, and 3.41% from two or more races. Hispanic or Latino of any race were 0.71% of the population.

There were 1,034 households, out of which 27.60% had children under the age of 18 living with them, 41.59% were married couples living together, 12.38% had a female householder with no spouse present, and 38.20% were non-families. 33.00% of all households were made up of individuals, and 16.90% had someone living alone who was 65 years of age or older. The average household size was 2.50 and the average family size was 3.26.

The township's age distribution consisted of 21.3% under the age of 18, 8.1% from 18 to 24, 23% from 25 to 44, 30.9% from 45 to 64, and 16.7% who were 65 years of age or older. The median age was 41.6 years. For every 100 females, there were 105.2 males. For every 100 females age 18 and over, there were 102.1 males.

The median income for a household in the township was $43,750, and the median income for a family was $53,672. Males had a median income of $31,761 versus $26,364 for females. The per capita income for the township was $22,861. About 5.0% of families and 10.7% of the population were below the poverty line, including 8.8% of those under age 18 and 4.6% of those age 65 or over.

Historical population
| Census | Pop. | Note | %± |
|---|---|---|---|
| 2000 | 3,063 | | — |
| 2010 | 3,040 | | −0.8% |
| 2020 | 2,552 | | −16.1% |
U.S. Decennial Census

== School districts ==
- Greenfield Community Unit School District 10
- North Greene Unit School District 3

== Political districts ==
- Illinois' 17th congressional district
- State House District 97
- State Senate District 49
