= White Hall Foundry =

- U.S. National Register of Historic Places
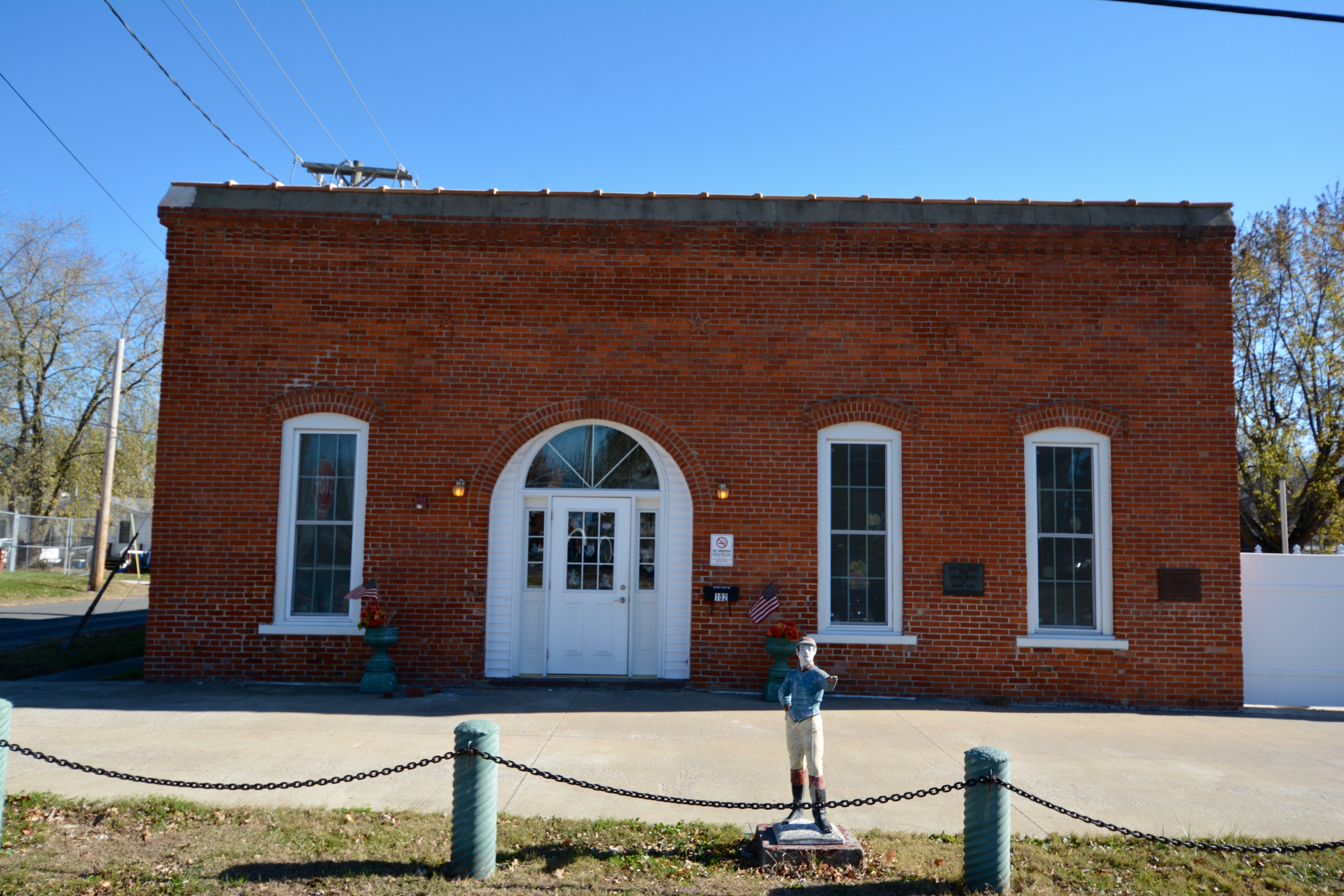

- Location within Illinois Location within the United States
- Location: 102 S. Jacksonville St., White Hall, Illinois
- Coordinates: 39°26′5″N 90°24′30″W
- Area: less than one acre
- Built: 1877
- NRHP reference No.: 80001365
- Added to NRHP: May 28, 1980

The White Hall Foundry is a historic iron foundry located at 102 S. Jacksonville St. in White Hall, Illinois. The foundry was built in 1877 for brothers George W. and Richard B. Winn. It produced cast iron for new buildings in White Hall, making it an important part of the city's economy during a building boom in the late 19th century. The building is a small brick structure with particularly well-crafted details for an industrial building, such as its cornice and fanlights. The internal truss system supporting the building's roof is an example of an inverted Kingpost truss, one of the few well-preserved examples of its kind in Illinois.

The foundry was added to the National Register of Historic Places on May 28, 1980. It is also part of the White Hall Historic District, which is listed on the National Register.
