= White Hall Historic District =

Historic district in Illinois, United States

- U.S. National Register of Historic Places
- U.S. Historic district
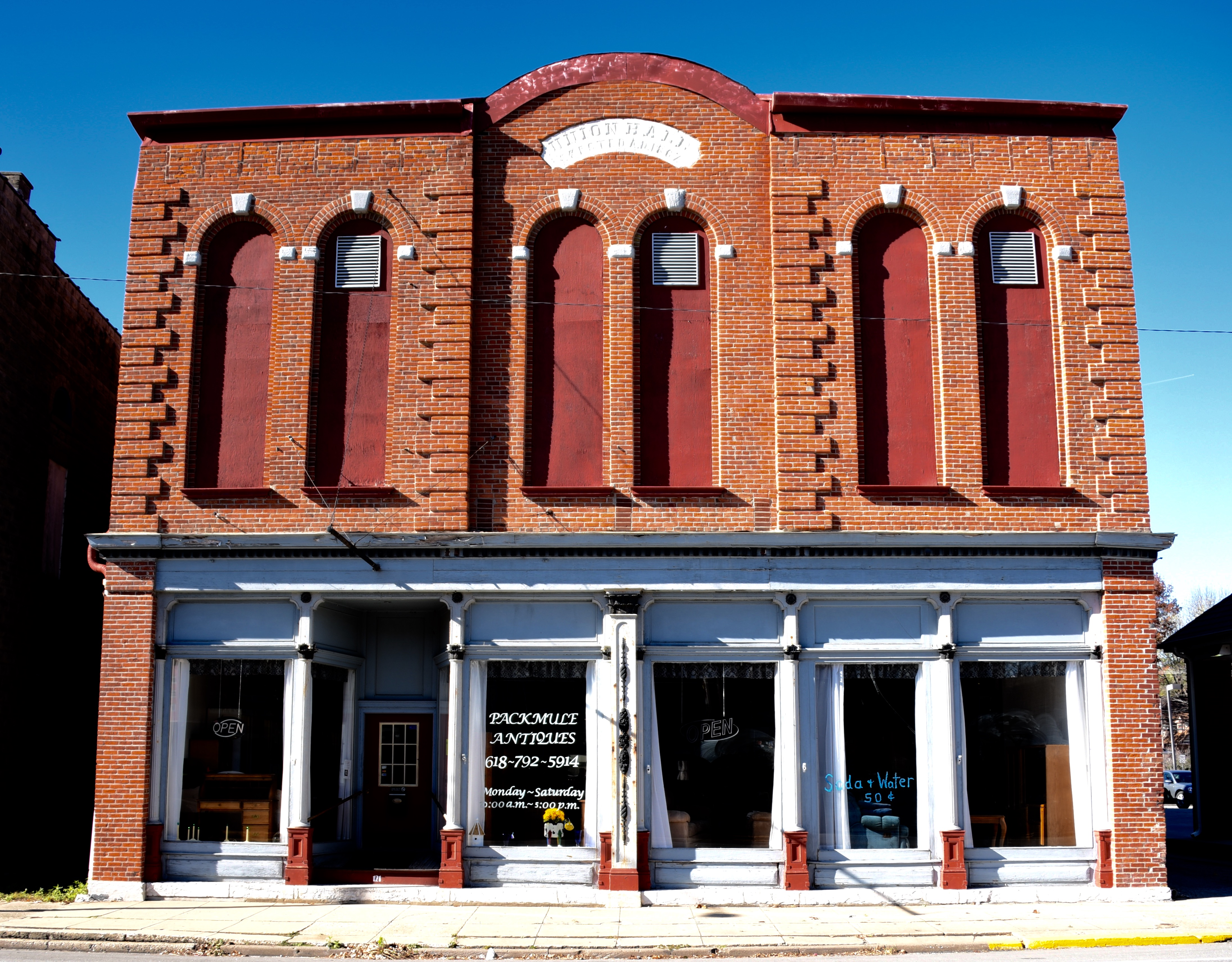

- Location within Illinois Location within the United States
- Location: Roughly bounded by Bridgeport, Jacksonville, Ayers, and Main Sts., White Hall, Illinois
- Coordinates: 39°26′12″N 90°24′11″W
- Area: 11 acres (4.5 ha)
- NRHP reference No.: 86003145
- Added to NRHP: May 20, 1987

The White Hall Historic District is a 11-acre (4.5 ha) historic district in White Hall, Illinois. The district, which includes two blocks of Main Street and roughly one block of Jacksonville Avenue, encompasses White Hall's historic commercial district. Most buildings in the district are brick structures built in the 1870s, White Hall's main period of commercial development; however, some date from the early 20th century as well. Some of the early buildings in the district include the White Hall Foundry, which produced cast iron pieces for several other buildings; the Grange Block and the White Hall National Bank, two bank buildings with complementary styling; the Dawdy Building, the only surviving wood-frame structure in the district; and several Italianate buildings, such as the Union Hall, the Masonic Hall, and the Brantzel's Building. Significant 20th-century additions to the district include Whiteside Park, home to a sculpture created by Lorado Taft; the White-Griswold Memorial Library, the city's public library; the Vitagraph Theater, which features a decorative terra cotta facade; and the Prairie School Chapin Building.

The district was added to the National Register of Historic Places on May 20, 1987. Early in 2017, a fire destroyed a section of the historic district on the west side of Main Street between Sherman and Bridgeport Streets.
