= Eldred, Illinois =

- Village
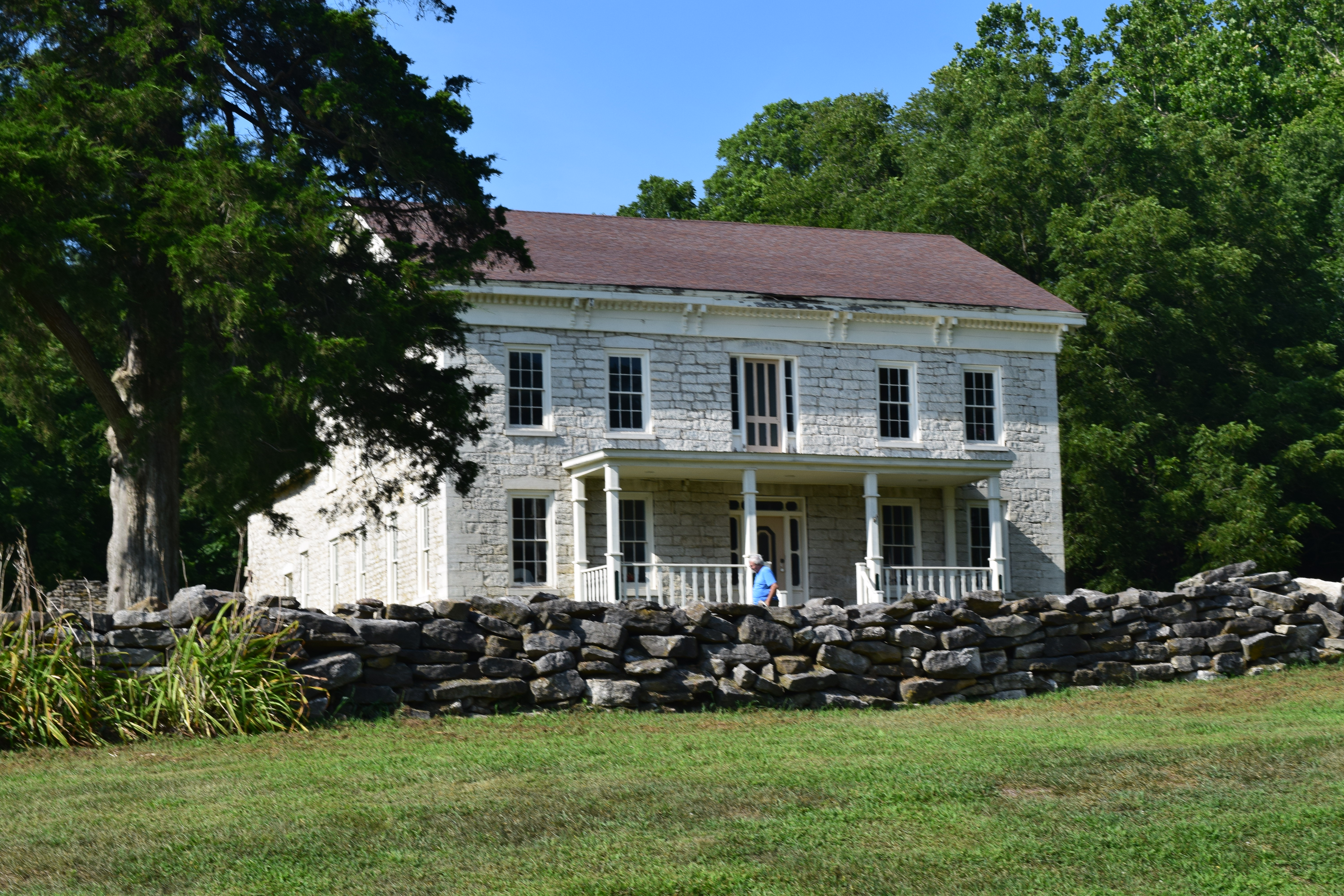
- James John Eldred House north of Eldred

- Location of Eldred in Greene County, Illinois.
- Coordinates: 39°17′10″N 90°33′14″W
- Country: United States
- State: Illinois
- County: Greene
- Township: Bluffdale

Area
  - Total: 0.14 sq mi (0.35 km^{2})
  - Land: 0.14 sq mi (0.35 km^{2})
  - Water: 0 sq mi (0.00 km^{2})
- Elevation: 446 ft (136 m)

Population (2020)
  - Total: 149
  - Density: 1,114.1/sq mi (430.17/km^{2})
- Time zone: UTC-6 (CST)
  - Summer (DST): UTC-5 (CDT)
- ZIP code: 62027
- Area code: 217
- FIPS code: 17-23022
- GNIS ID: 2398797

Eldred is a village in Greene County, Illinois, United States. The population was 149 at the 2020 census.

== History ==
Eldred was founded because of its situation in the Illinois River Bottoms as a town that combined the values of a river and a bluff-side village. Eldred first appeared on river plat books as "Farrow Town" in the 1830s, but was founded sometime before the admittance of Illinois as a state in 1818. A few of its original founders, were of Scotch-Irish ancestry from the Upland South.

== Geography ==
Eldred is located in southwestern Greene County. Illinois Route 108 passes through the village, leading east 8 miles (13 km) to Carrollton, the Greene County seat, and west 3 miles (5 km) to the Illinois River and the Kampsville ferry.

According to the 2021 census gazetteer files, Eldred has a total area of 0.13 square miles (0.34 km^{2}), all land.

Situated in the lower Illinois River Valley, 30 miles (48 km) north of the Illinois River's confluence with the Mississippi River at Grafton, Eldred is nestled between the soaring limestone bluffs and the fertile bottom land that follow the Illinois in its southern extreme. The bottoms were systematically drained during the 1920s, which caused much contention among the villagers as to the merits of drainage. Nevertheless, the drainage occurred and created a great expanse of farmland for the counties along the river.

== Demographics ==
Historical population
Census	Pop.	Note	%±
1910	241		—
1920	298		23.7%
1930	282		−5.4%
1940	340		20.6%
1950	298		−12.4%
1960	302		1.3%
1970	292		−3.3%
1980	286		−2.1%
1990	254		−11.2%
2000	211		−16.9%
2010	201		−4.7%
2020	149		−25.9%
U.S. Decennial Census

As of the 2020 census there were 149 people, 113 households, and 46 families residing in the village. The population density was 1,111.94 inhabitants per square mile (429.32/km^{2}). There were 101 housing units at an average density of 753.73 per square mile (291.02/km^{2}). The racial makeup of the village was 94.63% White, 0.00% African American, 0.00% Native American, 0.67% Asian, 0.00% Pacific Islander, 0.67% from other races, and 4.03% from two or more races. Hispanic or Latino of any race were 0.00% of the population.

There were 113 households, out of which 5.3% had children under the age of 18 living with them, 30.09% were married couples living together, 8.85% had a female householder with no husband present, and 59.29% were non-families. 57.52% of all households were made up of individuals, and 46.90% had someone living alone who was 65 years of age or older. The average household size was 2.96 and the average family size was 1.81.

The village's age distribution consisted of 7.4% under the age of 18, 3.4% from 18 to 24, 7.8% from 25 to 44, 42.2% from 45 to 64, and 39.2% who were 65 years of age or older. The median age was 56.5 years. For every 100 females, there were 98.1 males. For every 100 females age 18 and over, there were 107.7 males.

The median income for a household in the village was $41,875, and the median income for a family was $92,750. Males had a median income of $50,517 versus $40,438 for females. The per capita income for the village was $32,013. About 4.3% of families and 9.8% of the population were below the poverty line, including none of those under age 18 and 13.8% of those age 65 or over.
