= Greenfield, Illinois =

- City
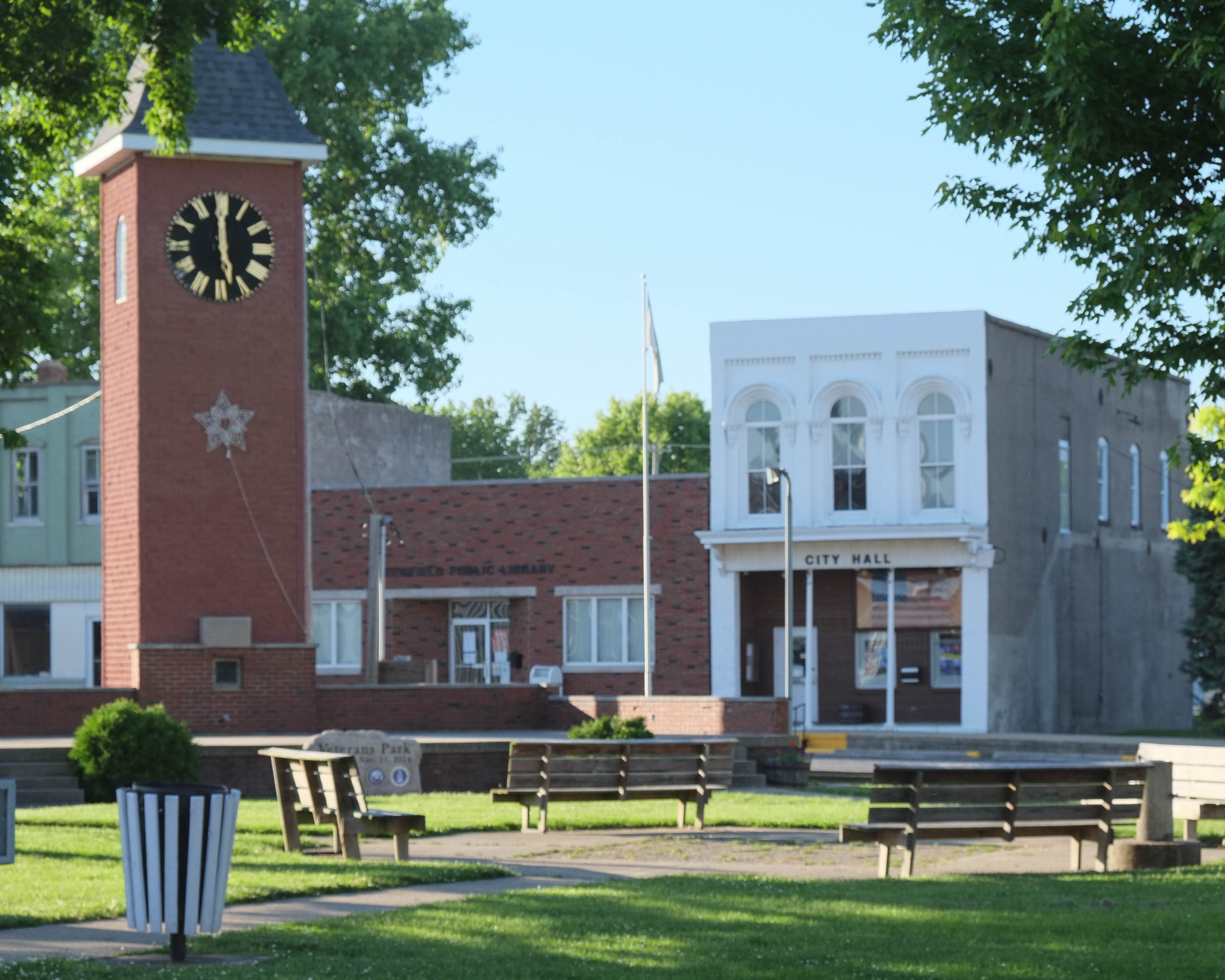
- City Hall and library

- Location of Greenfield in Greene County, Illinois.
- Coordinates: 39°20′40″N 90°12′29″W
- Country: United States
- State: Illinois
- County: Greene
- Townships: Rockbridge, Rubicon

Area
  - Total: 1.78 sq mi (4.60 km^{2})
  - Land: 1.71 sq mi (4.44 km^{2})
  - Water: 0.062 sq mi (0.16 km^{2})
- Elevation: 587 ft (179 m)

Population (2020)
  - Total: 1,059
  - Density: 617.9/sq mi (238.59/km^{2})
- Time zone: UTC-6 (CST)
  - Summer (DST): UTC-5 (CDT)
- ZIP code: 62044
- Area code: 217
- FIPS code: 17-31368
- GNIS feature ID: 2394987
- Website: www.greenfieldillinois.org

Greenfield is a city in Greene County, Illinois, United States. The population was 1,059 at the 2020 census. Greenfield was founded in the 1830s due to its fertile soils and is a rural farming community.

== Geography ==
Greenfield is located in eastern Greene County. Illinois Route 267 passes through the city, leading north 27 miles (43 km) to Jacksonville and south 13 miles (21 km) to Medora. Carrollton, the Greene County seat, is 13 miles (21 km) to the southwest via Routes 267 and 108.

According to the 2021 census gazetteer files, Greenfield has a total area of 1.78 square miles (4.61 km^{2}), of which 1.71 square miles (4.43 km^{2}) (or 96.45%) is land and 0.06 square miles (0.16 km^{2}) (or 3.55%) is water.

== Demographics ==
Historical population
Census	Pop.	Note	%±
1850	237		—
1860	1,599		574.7%
1880	985		—
1890	1,131		14.8%
1900	1,085		−4.1%
1910	1,161		7.0%
1920	1,149		−1.0%
1930	1,038		−9.7%
1940	1,006		−3.1%
1950	987		−1.9%
1960	1,064		7.8%
1970	1,179		10.8%
1980	1,090		−7.5%
1990	1,162		6.6%
2000	1,179		1.5%
2010	1,071		−9.2%
2020	1,059		−1.1%
U.S. Decennial Census

=== 2020 census ===
As of the 2020 census, Greenfield had a population of 1,059. The population density was 595.95 inhabitants per square mile (230.10/km^{2}) and the average housing unit density was 275.18 per square mile (106.25/km^{2}). There were 327 families residing in the city. The median age was 40.8 years. 24.5% of residents were under the age of 18 and 20.5% of residents were 65 years of age or older. For every 100 females there were 92.2 males, and for every 100 females age 18 and over there were 90.9 males age 18 and over.

0.0% of residents lived in urban areas, while 100.0% lived in rural areas.

There were 434 households in Greenfield, of which 28.8% had children under the age of 18 living in them. Of all households, 43.8% were married-couple households, 18.9% were households with a male householder and no spouse or partner present, and 29.5% were households with a female householder and no spouse or partner present. About 30.7% of all households were made up of individuals and 17.0% had someone living alone who was 65 years of age or older.

There were 489 housing units, of which 11.2% were vacant. The homeowner vacancy rate was 4.4% and the rental vacancy rate was 3.6%.

Racial composition as of the 2020 census
Race	Number	Percent
White	1,020	96.3%
Black or African American	0	0.0%
American Indian and Alaska Native	1	0.1%
Asian	0	0.0%
Native Hawaiian and Other Pacific Islander	1	0.1%
Some other race	3	0.3%
Two or more races	34	3.2%
Hispanic or Latino (of any race)	6	0.6%

=== Income and poverty ===
The median income for a household in the city was $50,139, and the median income for a family was $64,250. Males had a median income of $49,659 versus $21,786 for females. The per capita income for the city was $24,068. About 7.6% of families and 11.7% of the population were below the poverty line, including 24.7% of those under age 18 and 9.6% of those age 65 or over.

== Education ==
Greenfield is served by its own school district, Greenfield Community Unit School District Number 10. Greenfield CUSD 10 serves portions of Greene, Jersey, Macoupin and Morgan Counties. Schools include Greenfield High School and Greenfield Elementary School.
