= Illinois Route 267 =

North-south state highway in Illinois, US

Illinois Route 267
- IL 267 highlighted in red

Route information
- Maintained by IDOT
- Length: 59 mi (95 km) The distance reflects actual signage as of April 14, 2006. 2006 GIS data shows Illinois 267 to be 39.46 miles (63.50 km) long.
- Existed: 1965–present

Major junctions
- South end: US 67 / IL 111 in Godfrey
- I-72 / US 36 south of South Jacksonville
- North end: I-72 BL / US 67 Bus. / IL 104 in Jacksonville

Location
- Country: United States
- State: Illinois
- Counties: Madison, Jersey, Macoupin, Greene, Morgan

Highway system
- Illinois State Highway System; Interstate; US; State; Tollways; Scenic
← IL 255	→ I-270

Illinois Route 267 (IL 267) is a north–south highway in the U.S. state of Illinois. It runs from U.S. Route 67 (US 67) and Illinois Route 111 in Godfrey north to Illinois Route 104 and Business Interstate 72 (abbreviated BL 72) in Jacksonville. This is a distance of 59 miles (95 km). However, the state of Illinois' 2006 data shows the length of Illinois 267 as 39.46 miles (63.50 km), which is the distance from the Illinois 111/267 wye north to BL 72 at Illinois 104.

== Route description ==
Illinois 267 is a two-lane surface road for most its length. It runs through the small towns of Brighton, Medora, Rockbridge and Greenfield.

Starting at US 67 in Godfrey, IL 267 begins there as a four lane road, as well as the southern end of IL 111 concurrency. Almost immediately northeast of the US 67 junction, they meet IL 255 at a diamond interchange. Then, after going to a two-lane surface, they follow a railroad until they reach Brighton. At that point, they turn north. They then intersect IL 16 near Piasa. In Medora, IL 111 branches off northeast while IL 267 travels northwest. Near Rockbridge, IL 267 turns northward. It then meets IL 108 north of Rockbridge. Heading north of it and Greenfield, IL 267 meets Interstate 72 (I-72) and US 36 at a diamond interchange. In Jacksonville, it turns into a five lane road and ends at I-72 Bus./IL 104.

== History ==
The routing of Illinois 267 over its lifetime is directly related to the routing of U.S. 67 since the 1950s. This is because U.S. 67 has been used at times over both the western route through Carrollton and Jerseyville, and the eastern route through Brighton and Greenfield, with various alternates to U.S. 67 being used on the other routing during these times.

The western route originally was U.S. 67 until 1950. It became Alternate U.S. 67 from the 1950s through 1965 as U.S. 67 was moved to the eastern route. In 1965, the western route was renamed from Alt U.S. 67 to Illinois Route 267. In 2001, the Illinois Department of Transportation (IDOT) finished construction of the Jacksonville bypass (a four-lane freeway around the western edge of Jacksonville, north of Murrayville). As part of this project, IDOT reverted U.S. 67 south of Jacksonville to its original, western routing.

The eastern route was established as U.S. 67 in the mid 1950s, and continued as U.S. 67 through 2001. It then became Illinois 267 in 2001. The southern terminus of Illinois 267 initially was in Medora at Illinois 111; between 2001 and 2006, it was extended south to reconnect to U.S. 67 in Godfrey, concurrent with Illinois 111.

Around 2006, IDOT completed the U.S. 67 bypass south of I-72. U.S. 67 was then moved onto this new segment, and Illinois 267 extended north from Murrayville to Business I-72 in Jacksonville.

== Major intersections ==
County	Location	mi	km	Destinations	Notes
Madison	Godfrey	0.0	0.0	US 67 (Godfrey Rd) / IL 111 south	South end of IL 111 concurrency
Madison	Godfrey	0.2	0.32	IL 255	IL 255 exit 20
Jersey	No major junctions				
Macoupin		11.1	17.9	IL 16 – Jerseyville, Gillespie	
Macoupin	Medora	15.3	24.6	IL 111 north – Waverly	North end of IL 111 concurrency
Jersey	No major junctions				
Greene		25.3	40.7	IL 108 – Carrollton, Carlinville	
Morgan	South Jacksonville	52.1	83.8	I-72 / US 36 / US 67 Bus. south – Quincy, Springfield	I-72 exit 64; south end of US 67 Business concurrency
Morgan	Jacksonville	54.6	87.9	I-72 BL / US 67 Bus. north / IL 104 – Pittsfield, Quincy, Macomb, Springfield	North end of US 67 Business concurrency
1.000 mi = 1.609 km; 1.000 km = 0.621 mi: Concurrency terminus
