= Greene County, Illinois =

County in Illinois, United States

- County
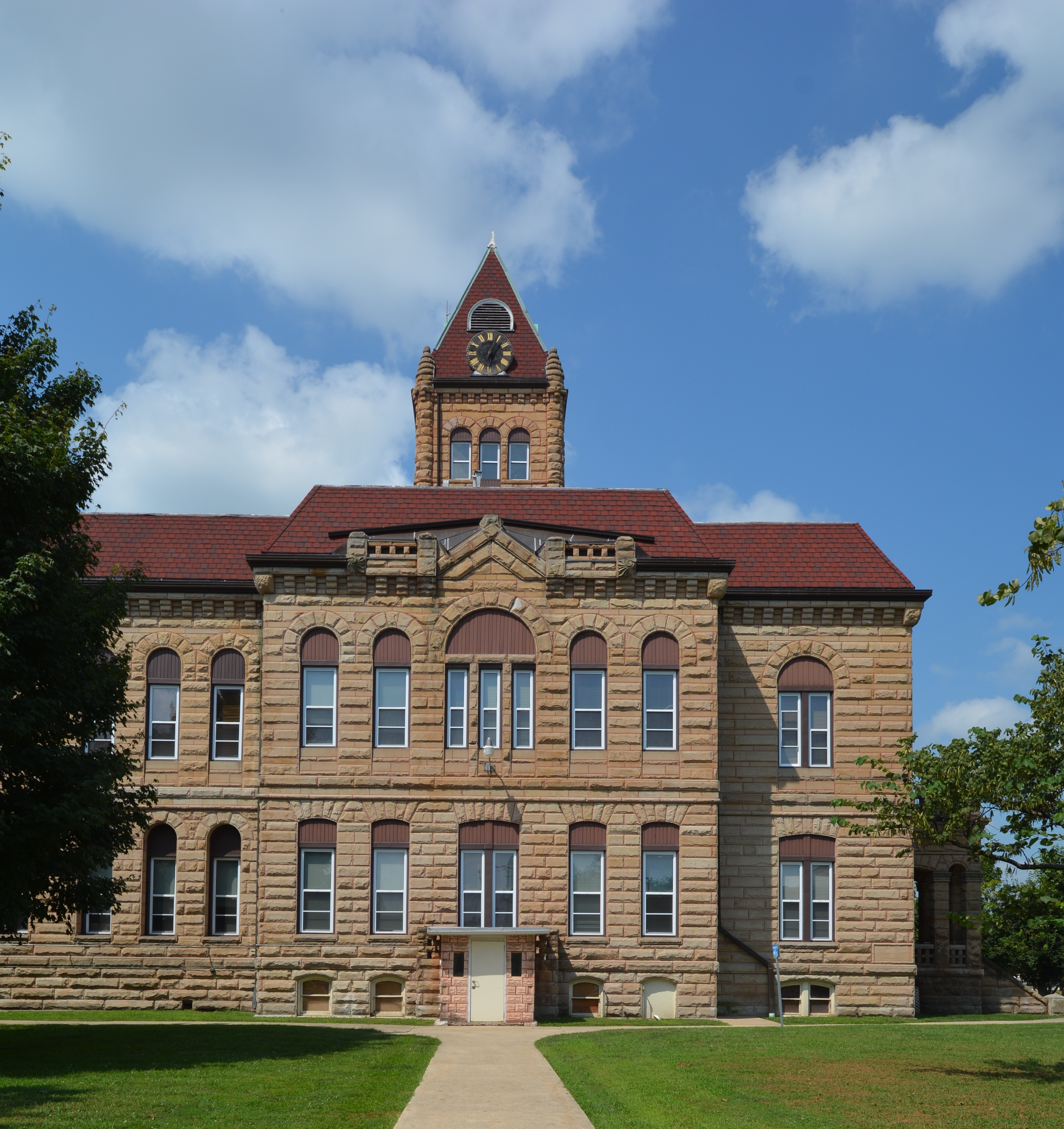
- Greene County Courthouse

- Location within the U.S. state of Illinois
- Coordinates: 39°21′N 90°23′W
- Country: United States
- State: Illinois
- Founded: 1821
- Named for: Nathanael Greene
- Seat: Carrollton
- Largest city: Carrollton

Area
  - Total: 546 sq mi (1,410 km^{2})
  - Land: 543 sq mi (1,410 km^{2})
  - Water: 3.3 sq mi (8.5 km^{2}) 0.6%

Population (2020)
  - Total: 11,985
  - Estimate (2025): 11,313 ▼
  - Density: 22.1/sq mi (8.52/km^{2})
- Time zone: UTC−6 (Central)
  - Summer (DST): UTC−5 (CDT)
- Congressional district: 15th
- Website: greenecountyil.org

Greene County is a county located in the U.S. state of Illinois. According to the 2020 United States census, it has a population of 11,843. Its county seat is Carrollton.

A notable archaeological area, the Koster Site, has produced evidence of more than 7,000 years of human habitation. Artifacts from the site are displayed at the Center for American Archeology in Kampsville, Illinois.

== History ==
Greene County is named in honor of General Nathanael Greene, a hero of the American Revolutionary War. In 1821, three years after Illinois became a state, Greene County was established, being carved out of what was previously Madison county and St. Clair county before that. Over the course of the next 18 years four more counties were formed out of what was once Greene Country. These include Scott, Morgan, Macoupin and Jersey counties. This left Greene county with approximately 546 square miles of land located in western-central Illinois near the Illinois River, which was an important resource that provided both a means for travel and to ship goods. Like much of southern Illinois the earliest settlers in the county came from Southern states such as North and South Carolina, Virginia, Kentucky, and Tennessee. By the time of the Civil War, 1860, the population of Greene County had grown to 16,093 and 10% of the adult population had been born in the Northeast, 15% were foreign born, 25% were born in Southern states, and almost 50% had been born in the Midwest. Of the population born in the Midwest many could still trace their roots to the South, with almost 80% of them having parents born in a Southern state.

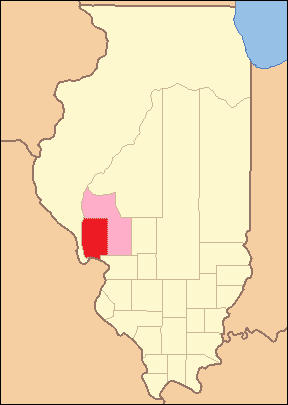
Greene County from its creation in 1821 to 1823, including unorganized territory temporarily attached to it.

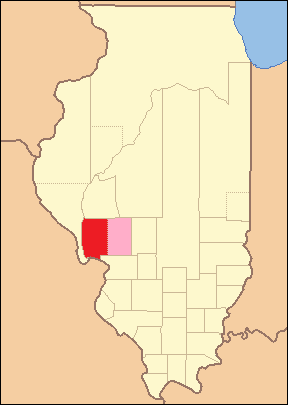
Greene County between 1823 and 1825

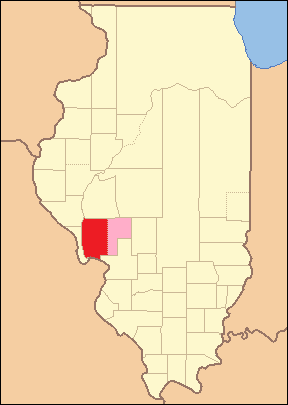
Greene between 1825 and 1829

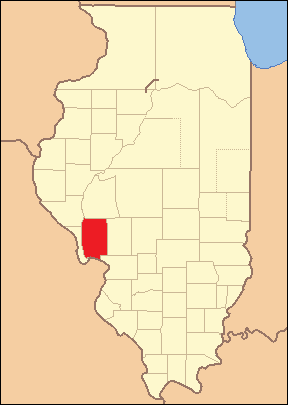
Greene between 1829 and 1839

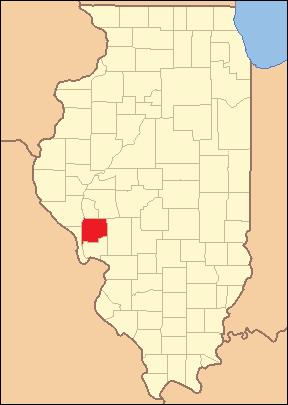
Greene in 1839 after the creation of Jersey County reduced Greene to its current size

== Geography ==
According to the US Census Bureau, the county has a total area of 546 square miles (1,410 km^{2}), of which 543 square miles (1,410 km^{2}) is land and 3.3 square miles (8.5 km^{2}) (0.6%) is water.

=== Climate and weather ===
Carrollton, Illinois

Climate chart (precipitation, max. and min. temperature)
J	F	M	A	M	J	J	A	S	O	N	D
1.6 34 16	1.8 40 20	3.3 52 30	3.6 64 42	4.3 74 52	3.6 83 61	3.4 87 65	2.8 85 63	3 78 54	2.6 67 43	3.3 52 32	2.6 39 21
- █ Average max. and min. temperatures in °F
- █ Precipitation totals in inches
- Source: The Weather Channel
Metric conversion
J	F	M	A	M	J	J	A	S	O	N	D
41 1 −9	44 4 −7	83 11 −1	90 18 6	110 23 11	90 28 16	86 31 18	72 29 17	75 26 12	67 19 6	83 11 0	65 4 −6
- █ Average max. and min. temperatures in °C
- █ Precipitation totals in mm

In recent years, average temperatures in the county seat of Carrollton have ranged from a low of 16 °F (−9 °C) in January to a high of 87 °F (31 °C) in July, although a record low of −26 °F (−32 °C) was recorded in January 1912 and a record high of 113 °F (45 °C) was recorded in July 1934. Average monthly precipitation ranged from 1.60 inches (41 mm) in January to 4.34 inches (110 mm) in May.

=== Major highways ===
- U.S. Highway 67
- Illinois Route 16
- Illinois Route 100
- Illinois Route 106
- Illinois Route 108
- Illinois Route 267

=== Adjacent counties ===
- Scott County - north
- Morgan County - north
- Macoupin County - east
- Jersey County - south
- Calhoun County - southwest
- Pike County - northwest

=== National protected area ===
- Two Rivers National Wildlife Refuge (part: Apple Creek Division)

== Demographics ==
Historical population
Census	Pop.	Note	%±
1830	7,674		—
1840	11,951		55.7%
1850	12,429		4.0%
1860	16,093		29.5%
1870	20,277		26.0%
1880	23,010		13.5%
1890	23,791		3.4%
1900	23,402		−1.6%
1910	22,363		−4.4%
1920	22,883		2.3%
1930	20,417		−10.8%
1940	20,292		−0.6%
1950	18,852		−7.1%
1960	17,460		−7.4%
1970	17,014		−2.6%
1980	16,661		−2.1%
1990	15,317		−8.1%
2000	14,761		−3.6%
2010	13,886		−5.9%
2020	11,985		−13.7%
2025 (est.)	11,313	▼	−5.6%
US Decennial Census; 1790–1960 1900–1990; 1990–2000 2010–2013

2000 census age pyramid for Greene County

=== 2020 census ===
As of the 2020 census, the county had a population of 11,985. The median age was 44.3 years, with 22.3% of residents under the age of 18 and 21.5% aged 65 or older. For every 100 females there were 98.4 males, and for every 100 females age 18 and over there were 97.7 males age 18 and over.

The racial makeup of the county was 95.9% White, 0.2% Black or African American, 0.1% American Indian and Alaska Native, 0.2% Asian, <0.1% Native Hawaiian and Pacific Islander, 0.3% from some other race, and 3.3% from two or more races. Hispanic or Latino residents of any race comprised 0.9% of the population.

<0.1% of residents lived in urban areas, while 100.0% lived in rural areas.

There were 5,041 households in the county, of which 27.5% had children under the age of 18 living in them. Of all households, 48.1% were married-couple households, 19.5% were households with a male householder and no spouse or partner present, and 24.2% were households with a female householder and no spouse or partner present. About 30.7% of all households were made up of individuals and 15.8% had someone living alone who was 65 years of age or older.

There were 5,785 housing units, of which 12.9% were vacant. Among occupied housing units, 76.1% were owner-occupied and 23.9% were renter-occupied. The homeowner vacancy rate was 3.0% and the rental vacancy rate was 6.6%.

=== Racial and ethnic composition ===
Greene County County, Illinois – Racial and ethnic composition Note: the US Census treats Hispanic/Latino as an ethnic category. This table excludes Latinos from the racial categories and assigns them to a separate category. Hispanics/Latinos may be of any race.
Race / Ethnicity (NH = Non-Hispanic)	Pop 1980	Pop 1990	Pop 2000	Pop 2010	Pop 2020	% 1980	% 1990	% 2000	% 2010	% 2020
White alone (NH)	16,557	15,201	14,442	13,517	11,451	99.38%	99.24%	97.84%	97.34%	95.54%
Black or African American alone (NH)	13	14	109	119	18	0.08%	0.09%	0.74%	0.86%	0.15%
Native American or Alaska Native alone (NH)	8	45	34	20	13	0.05%	0.29%	0.23%	0.14%	0.11%
Asian alone (NH)	15	13	13	16	21	0.09%	0.08%	0.09%	0.12%	0.18%
Native Hawaiian or Pacific Islander alone (NH)	x	x	3	2	3	x	x	0.02%	0.01%	0.03%
Other race alone (NH)	8	0	5	4	23	0.05%	0.00%	0.03%	0.03%	0.19%
Mixed race or Multiracial (NH)	x	x	78	93	350	x	x	0.53%	0.67%	2.92%
Hispanic or Latino (any race)	60	44	77	115	106	0.36%	0.29%	0.52%	0.83%	0.88%
Total	16,661	15,317	14,761	13,886	11,985	100.00%	100.00%	100.00%	100.00%	100.00%

=== 2010 census ===
As of the 2010 United States census, there were 13,886 people, 5,570 households, and 3,777 families living in the county. The population density was 25.6 inhabitants per square mile (9.9/km^{2}). There were 6,389 housing units at an average density of 11.8 per square mile (4.6/km^{2}). The racial makeup of the county was 97.9% white, 0.9% black or African American, 0.2% American Indian, 0.1% Asian, 0.3% from other races, and 0.7% from two or more races. Those of Hispanic or Latino origin made up 0.8% of the population. In terms of ancestry, 30.7% were German, 14.7% were Irish, 13.3% were English, and 12.1% were American.

Of the 5,570 households, 30.9% had children under the age of 18 living with them, 53.0% were married couples living together, 9.4% had a female householder with no husband present, 32.2% were non-families, and 27.8% of all households were made up of individuals. The average household size was 2.44 and the average family size was 2.95. The median age was 41.6 years.

The median income for a household in the county was $41,450 and the median income for a family was $52,049. Males had a median income of $38,185 versus $27,231 for females. The per capita income for the county was $22,107. About 11.8% of families and 15.1% of the population were below the poverty line, including 22.1% of those under age 18 and 10.0% of those age 65 or over.

== Communities ==
=== Cities ===
- Carrollton
- Greenfield
- Roodhouse
- White Hall

=== Villages ===
- Eldred
- Hillview
- Kane
- Rockbridge
- Wilmington

=== Unincorporated communities ===
- Athensville
- Barrow
- Belltown
- Boyle
- Drake
- Fayette
- Woody
- Wrights

=== Townships ===
- Athensville
- Bluffdale
- Carrollton
- Kane
- Linder
- Patterson
- Rockbridge
- Roodhouse
- Rubicon
- Walkerville
- White Hall
- Woodville
- Wrights

=== Population ranking ===
The population ranking of the following table is based on the 2020 census of Greene County.

† county seat

Rank	Place	Municipal type	Population (2020 Census)
1	† Carrollton	City	2,485
2	White Hall	City	2,295
3	Roodhouse	City	1,578
4	Greenfield	City	1,059
5	Kane	Village	296
6	Rockbridge	Village	175
7	Eldred	Village	149
8	Hillview	Village	94
9	Wilmington (Patterson)	Village	91

== Politics ==
Greene County was reliably Democratic from the beginning through 1948; only one Republican Party nominee carried the county vote during that period. Since then it has usually voted for the Republican presidential nominee (14 of 18 elections).

As one of the most northerly “southern” counties in Illinois, Greene County was rock-ribbed Democratic for the seventy years after the Civil War, which it opposed as a “Yankee” war. Not until considerable anti-Catholic sentiment against Al Smith turned many voters to Herbert Hoover did the county support a Republican presidential nominee. However, with the coming of World War II, opposition to American involvement led to gains for Wendell Willkie and Thomas E. Dewey, although apart from the 1960 election – also influenced by Catholicism – Greene was a bellwether county throughout the period from 1928 to 2004.

Hillary Clinton’s 2016 tally of 21.68 percent of the county’s vote is 14.3 percent worse than any Democratic presidential candidate before 2012. As of February 2025, the county is one of 7 that voted to join the state of Indiana.

=== Election results ===
United States presidential election results for Greene County, Illinois
Year	Republican		Democratic		Third party(ies)	
Year	No.	%	No.	%	No.	%
1892	1,967	35.16%	3,146	56.24%	481	8.60%
1896	2,365	36.88%	3,983	62.11%	65	1.01%
1900	2,131	35.53%	3,785	63.11%	81	1.35%
1904	1,959	40.14%	2,649	54.28%	272	5.57%
1908	2,004	37.19%	3,159	58.62%	226	4.19%
1912	831	17.04%	2,801	57.44%	1,244	25.51%
1916	3,400	35.60%	6,150	64.40%	0	0.00%
1920	3,685	47.96%	3,776	49.15%	222	2.89%
1924	3,527	39.73%	4,648	52.35%	703	7.92%
1928	4,299	51.05%	4,076	48.40%	46	0.55%
1932	2,857	30.61%	6,347	67.99%	131	1.40%
1936	3,916	37.14%	6,510	61.74%	118	1.12%
1940	4,840	44.30%	6,015	55.06%	70	0.64%
1944	4,261	49.70%	4,268	49.78%	45	0.52%
1948	3,639	47.09%	4,035	52.22%	53	0.69%
1952	5,019	54.96%	4,106	44.96%	7	0.08%
1956	4,718	54.57%	3,909	45.21%	19	0.22%
1960	4,487	53.78%	3,847	46.10%	10	0.12%
1964	3,128	39.55%	4,781	60.45%	0	0.00%
1968	3,944	51.17%	3,094	40.14%	670	8.69%
1972	4,673	62.13%	2,824	37.55%	24	0.32%
1976	3,706	47.35%	4,057	51.83%	64	0.82%
1980	4,224	59.33%	2,607	36.62%	289	4.06%
1984	4,057	60.96%	2,563	38.51%	35	0.53%
1988	3,136	50.56%	3,020	48.69%	47	0.76%
1992	2,391	34.00%	3,164	44.99%	1,477	21.00%
1996	2,245	37.83%	2,734	46.07%	955	16.09%
2000	3,129	54.26%	2,490	43.18%	148	2.57%
2004	3,559	58.65%	2,457	40.49%	52	0.86%
2008	3,053	52.40%	2,619	44.95%	154	2.64%
2012	3,451	61.22%	2,023	35.89%	163	2.89%
2016	4,145	74.22%	1,205	21.58%	235	4.21%
2020	4,770	76.48%	1,349	21.63%	118	1.89%
2024	4,719	77.68%	1,220	20.08%	136	2.24%

== See also ==
- National Register of Historic Places listings in Greene County, Illinois
