= Carrollton, Illinois =

- City
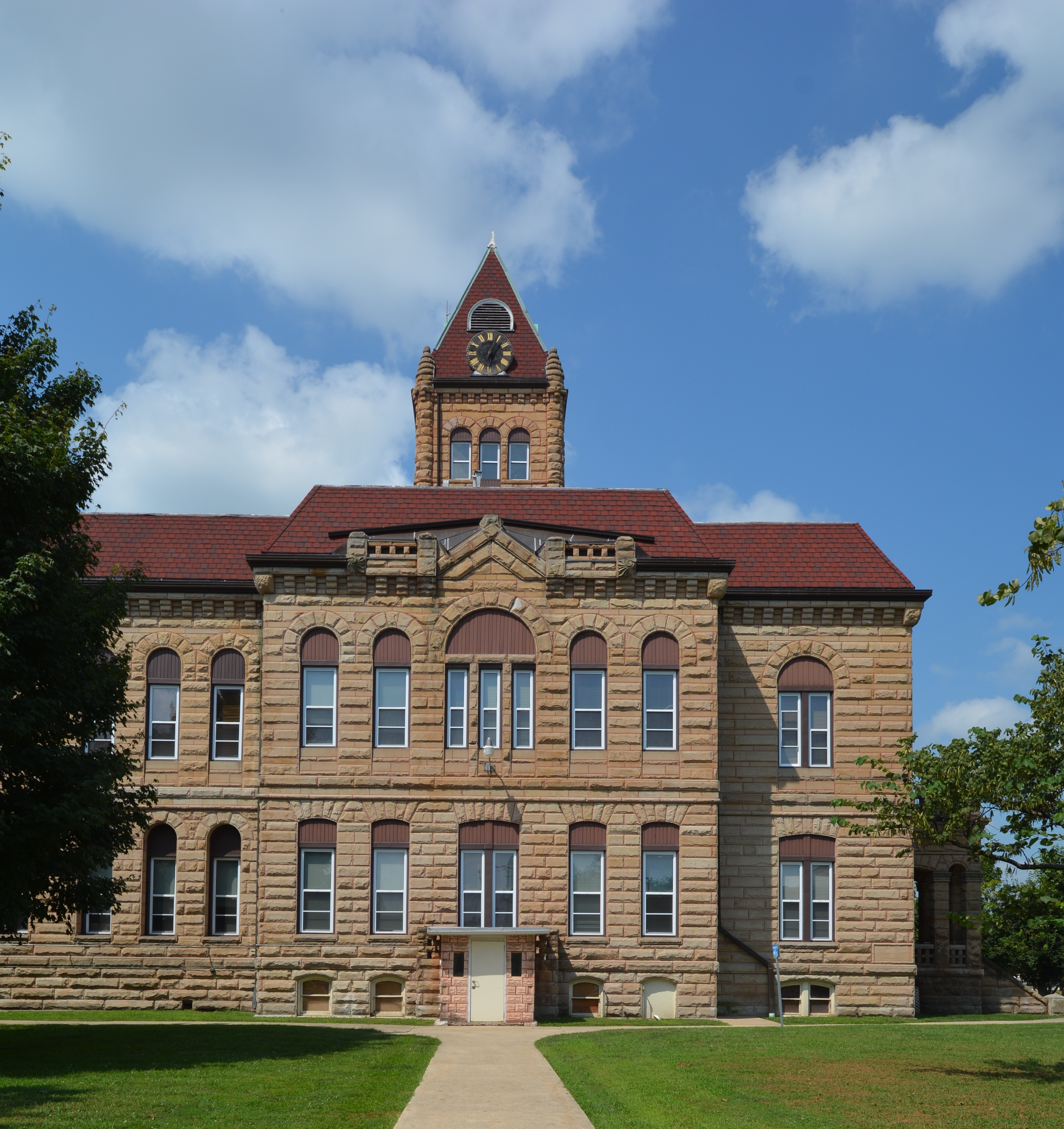
- Carrollton Courthouse Square Historic District
- Interactive map of Carrollton, Illinois
- Location within Illinois Location within the United States
- Coordinates: 39°17′48″N 90°24′29″W
- Country: United States
- State: Illinois
- County: Greene
- Township: Carrollton

Area
  - Total: 1.90 sq mi (4.93 km^{2})
  - Land: 1.90 sq mi (4.93 km^{2})
  - Water: 0 sq mi (0.00 km^{2})
- Elevation: 607 ft (185 m)

Population (2020)
  - Total: 2,485
  - Density: 1,306.4/sq mi (504.39/km^{2})
- Time zone: UTC-6 (CST)
  - Summer (DST): UTC-5 (CDT)
- ZIP Code: 62016
- Area code: 217
- FIPS code: 17-11462
- GNIS feature ID: 2393753
- Website: www.carrolltonil.net

Carrollton is a city in and the county seat of Greene County, Illinois, United States. The population was 2,485 as of the 2020 census.

== Geography ==
Carrollton is located in south-central Greene County. U.S. Route 67 passes through the city as 5th Street, leading north 35 miles (56 km) to Jacksonville and south 32 miles (51 km) to Alton on the Mississippi River. Illinois Route 108 (Main Street) crosses US 67 in the center of town, leading east 29 miles (47 km) to Carlinville and west 11 miles (18 km) to Kampsville on the Illinois River.

According to the 2021 census gazetteer files, Carrollton has a total area of 1.90 square miles (4.92 km^{2}), of which 1.90 square miles (4.92 km^{2}) (or 99.89%) is land and 0.00 square miles (0.00 km^{2}) (or 0.11%) is water.

It is located 68 miles (109 km) southwest of Springfield, the state capital, and is 60 miles (97 km) north of St. Louis, Missouri. Greene County borders the Metro East area.

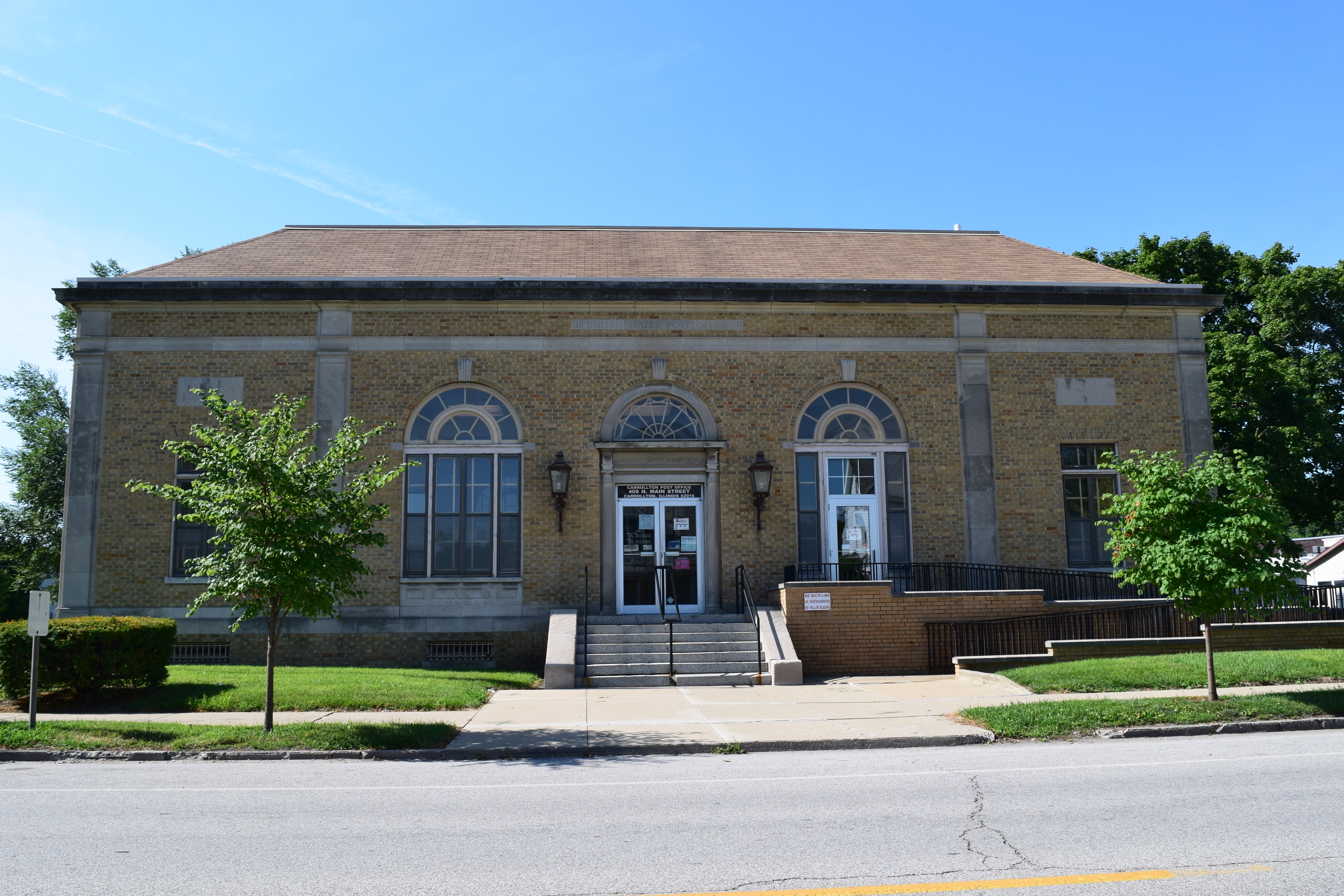
Carrollton post office

== Demographics ==
Historical population
Census	Pop.	Note	%±
1880	1,934		—
1890	2,258		16.8%
1900	2,355		4.3%
1910	2,323		−1.4%
1920	2,020		−13.0%
1930	2,075		2.7%
1940	2,285		10.1%
1950	2,437		6.7%
1960	2,558		5.0%
1970	2,866		12.0%
1980	2,816		−1.7%
1990	2,507		−11.0%
2000	2,605		3.9%
2010	2,484		−4.6%
2020	2,485		0.0%
U.S. Decennial Census

=== 2020 census ===
As of the 2020 census, Carrollton had a population of 2,485, with 1,094 households and 681 families residing in the city. The population density was 1,305.15 inhabitants per square mile (503.92/km^{2}). There were 1,214 housing units at an average density of 637.61 per square mile (246.18/km^{2}).

The median age was 41.3 years. 23.5% of residents were under the age of 18 and 21.5% of residents were 65 years of age or older. For every 100 females there were 92.5 males, and for every 100 females age 18 and over there were 89.6 males age 18 and over.

There were 1,094 households, of which 29.3% had children under the age of 18 living in them. Of all households, 43.9% were married-couple households, 17.5% were households with a male householder and no spouse or partner present, and 30.2% were households with a female householder and no spouse or partner present. About 33.1% of all households were made up of individuals and 17.9% had someone living alone who was 65 years of age or older.

0.0% of residents lived in urban areas, while 100.0% lived in rural areas. Of the 1,214 housing units, 9.9% were vacant. The homeowner vacancy rate was 2.7% and the rental vacancy rate was 6.1%.

Racial composition as of the 2020 census
Race	Number	Percent
White	2,366	95.2%
Black or African American	11	0.4%
American Indian and Alaska Native	2	0.1%
Asian	6	0.2%
Native Hawaiian and Other Pacific Islander	0	0.0%
Some other race	8	0.3%
Two or more races	92	3.7%
Hispanic or Latino (of any race)	37	1.5%

=== Income and poverty ===
The median income for a household in the city was $60,280, and the median income for a family was $66,813. Males had a median income of $42,664 versus $18,596 for females. The per capita income for the city was $30,908. About 7.2% of families and 8.5% of the population were below the poverty line, including 14.2% of those under age 18 and 4.0% of those age 65 or over.

== Economy ==
=== Banks ===
There are two banks in Carrollton: Carrollton Bank and CNB Bank. Records show CNB Bank to be the oldest continuously active bank headquartered in Illinois.

== Education ==
Carrollton is home to three schools: Carrollton High School (Carrollton, Illinois), Carrollton Grade School, and St. John the Evangelist Catholic School.

== Notable people ==
- Karen Allen (born 1951), actress (Raiders of the Lost Ark and Indiana Jones and the Kingdom of the Crystal Skull)
- Edward Dickinson Baker, soldier, former U.S. congressman from Illinois, U.S. senator from Oregon
- Thomas Carlin, 7th Governor of Illinois, lived and died in Carrollton
- Sam Coonrod, pitcher for the Philadelphia Phillies and member of the 2011 Carrollton Hawks baseball team
- Alicia DeShasier, All-American softball player at Southern Illinois University Edwardsville
- James Barnet Fry (1827–1894), US Army brevet major general; military historian; born in Carrollton
- John Hyde (1865–1912), Presbyterian missionary to India; known as "Praying Hyde"
- Norman L. Jones (1870–1940), Illinois Supreme Court justice
- Barbara Owens, mystery writer; winner of the Edgar Award for Best Short Story ("The Cloud Beneath the Eaves")
- Henry Thomas Rainey (1860–1934), Speaker of the US House of Representatives during President Franklin D. Roosevelt's first term.
- Major Marcus Reno, commanded a battalion of the 7th U.S. Cavalry at the Battle of the Little Bighorn
- William Sharon (1821–1885), United States Senator from Nevada.
- Gregon A. Williams, Marine Corps Major general; served in Nicaragua, World War II and Korean War
- David M. Woodson, lawyer, jurist, politician; practiced law in Carrollton
