= List of sanatoria in the United States =

The following is a list of notable sanatoria (singular: sanatorium) in the United States. Sanatoria were medical facilities that specialized in treatment for long-term illnesses. Many sanatoria in the United States specialized in treatment of tuberculosis in the twentieth century prior to the discovery of antibiotics.

== List ==
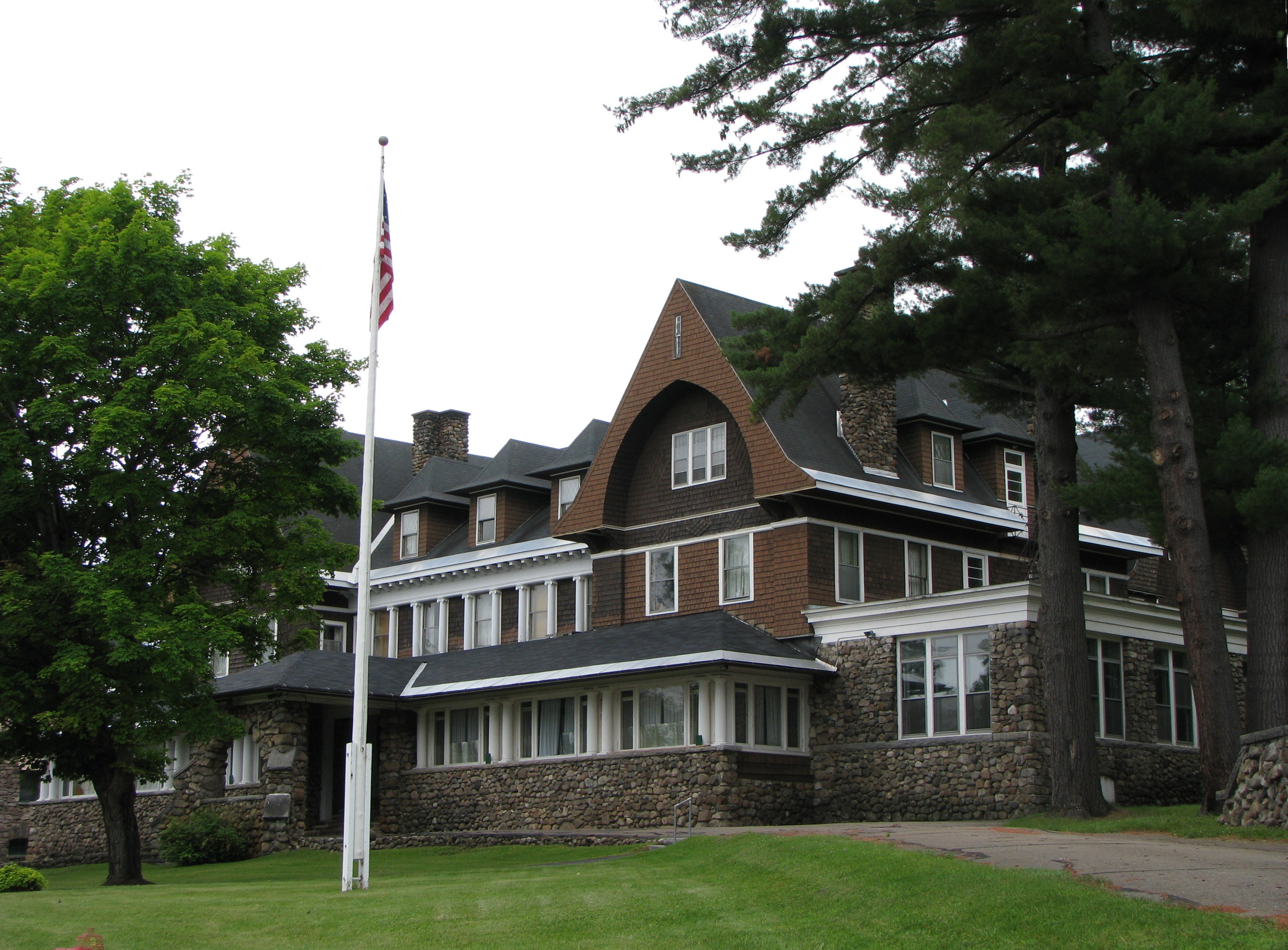
Adirondack Cottage Sanitarium, Saranac Lake, New York

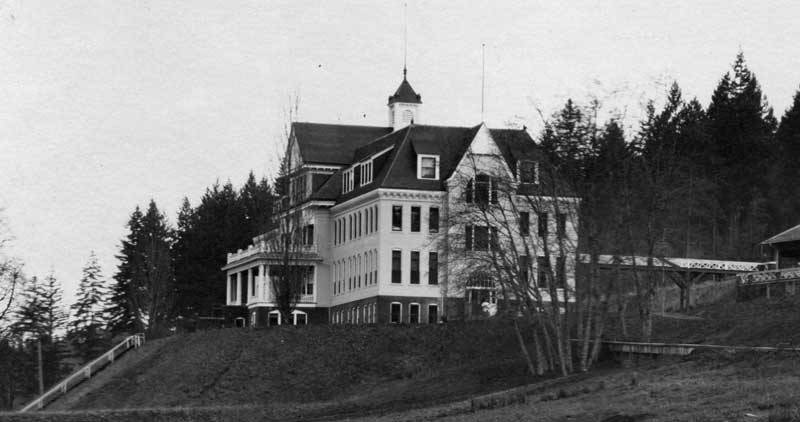
Oregon State Tuberculosis Hospital, Salem, Oregon

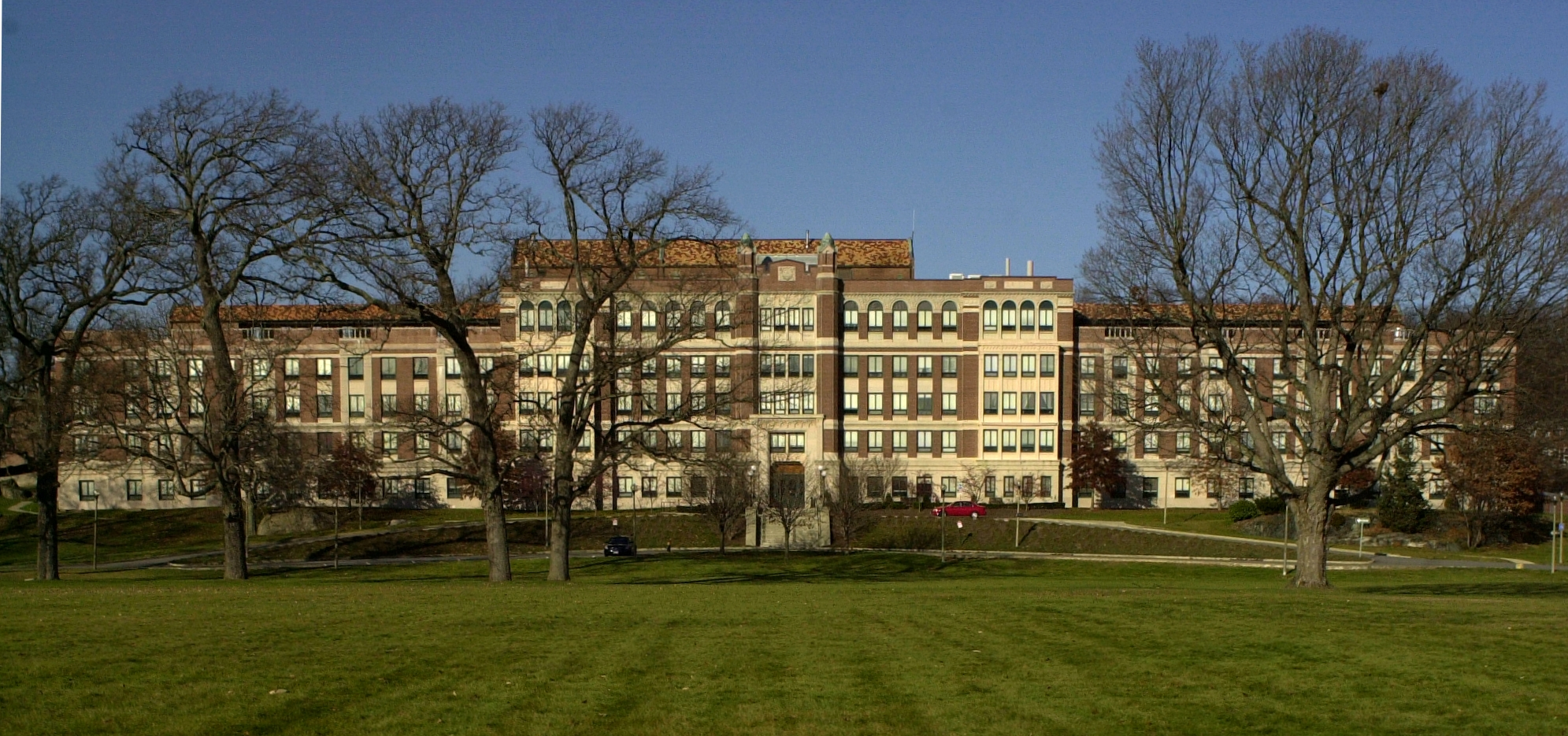
Boston Consumptives Hospital, Boston, Massachusetts

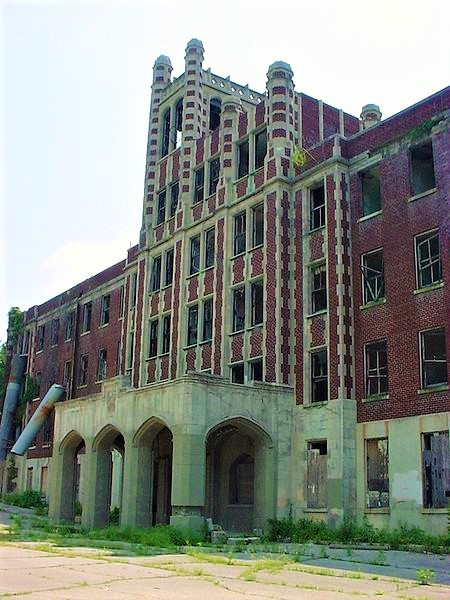
Waverly Hills Sanitorium, Louisville, Kentucky

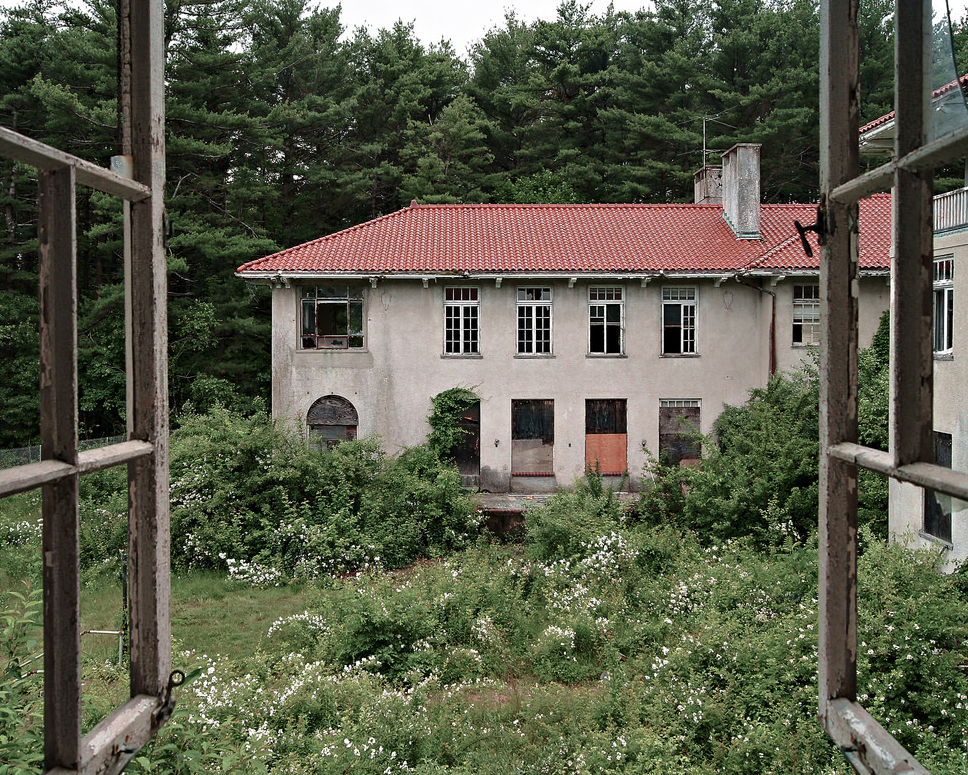
Cranberry Specialty Hospital, Hanson, Massachusetts

Est.	Name	Location	Notes	Ref.
1853	Batavia Institute	Batavia, Illinois		
1866	Battle Creek Sanitarium	Battle Creek, Michigan		
1881	Brooklyn Home for Consumptives	Brooklyn, New York		
1881	Rockhaven Sanitarium	Crescenta Valley, California		
1884	Montefiore Home for Chronic Invalids	Manhattan, New York		
1885	Adirondack Cottage Sanitarium	Saranac Lake, New York		
1887	Sierra Madre Villa	Pasadena, California		
before 1894	Camp Harding	Colorado Springs		
1896	River Crest Sanitarium	Astoria, New York		
1899	National Jewish Health	Denver, Colorado		
1900	Bromley Sanitarium	Sonora, California		
1901	Riverside Sanitarium and Hospital	Nashville, Tennessee		
1902	Barlow Respiratory Hospital	Los Angeles, California		
1903	Pottenger Sanatorium	Monrovia, California		
1904	Temple Sanitarium	Temple, Texas		
1904	Las Encinas Sanitarium	Pasadena, California		
1904	Paradise Valley Hospital California	National City, California		
1905	Swedish Medical Center	Englewood, Colorado		
1905	Portland Open-Air Sanatorium	Milwaukie Heights, Oregon		
1905	Oregon State Tuberculosis Hospital	Salem, Oregon		
1907	Boston Consumptives Hospital	Boston, Massachusetts		
1907	Missouri State Sanatorium	Mount Vernon, Missouri		
1907	Maryland Tuberculosis Sanitorium	Sabillasville, Maryland		
1907	Edward Sanitorium	Naperville, Illinois		
1907	Minnesota State Sanatorium for Consumptives	Walker, Minnesota		
1907	Wisconsin State Tuberculosis Sanatorium	Wales, Wisconsin		
1907	Vermont Sanatorium	Pittsford, Vermont		
1909	Arkansas Tuberculosis Sanatorium	Booneville, Arkansas		
1909	Catawba Sanatorium	Roanoke, Virginia		
1909	La Vina Sanitarium	Altadena, California		
1909	San Haven Sanatorium	Dunseith, North Dakota		
1910	Undercliff State Hospital	Meriden, Connecticut		
1910	Waverly Hills Sanatorium	Jefferson County, Kentucky		
1910	Pine Camp Tuberculosis Hospital	Richmond, Virginia		
1911	Firland Sanatorium	Seattle, Washington		
1911	Lima Tuberculosis Hospital	Lima, Ohio		
1912	Blackburn Sanitarium	Klamath Falls, Oregon		
1912	Pine Bluff State Hospital	Salisbury, Maryland		
1913	Arroyo del Valle Sanitarium	Livermore, California		
1913	Sample Sanitarium	Fresno, California		
1913	State Tuberculosis Sanitarium	Galen, Montana		
1914	Belgum Sanitarium	Richmond, California		
1914	Saratoga County Homestead	Providence, New York		
1915	Chicago Municipal Tuberculosis Sanitarium	Chicago, Illinois		
1915	Enid Government Springs Sanatorium	Enid, Oklahoma		
1915	Muirdale Tuberculosis Sanatorium	Milwaukee County, Wisconsin		
1916	Glen Lake Sanatorium	Hennepin County, Minnesota		
1916	Cresson Tuberculosis Sanatorium	Cresson, Pennsylvania		
1917	Hot Lake Sanitorium	Hot Lake, Oregon		
1917	Piedmont Sanatorium	Burkeville, Virginia		
1917	DeRidder Sanitarium	DeRidder, Louisiana	DeRidder's first hospital was known as the Cottage Sanitarium, built in 1917.	
1918	Bancroft's Castle	Groton, Massachusetts		
1919	Cranberry Specialty Hospital	Hanson, Massachusetts		
1919	Fairview Sanatorium	Normal, Illinois		
1919	Washington County Tuberculosis Hospital	Barre, Vermont		
1920	Olive View Sanitarium	Los Angeles, California		
1920	Pureair Sanatorium	Bayfield County, Wisconsin		
1922	Deborah Heart and Lung Center	Browns Mills, New Jersey		
1922?	El Sausal Sanitarium	Salinas, California		
1922	Henryton State Hospital	Marriottsville, Maryland		
1922	Oshrin Hospital	Tucson, Arizona	Formally called Barfield Sanatorium	
1923	Halifax County Home and Tubercular Hospital	Halifax, North Carolina		
1923	Caverly Preventorium	Pittsford, Vermont		
1926	National Methodist Sanatorium	Colorado Springs, Colorado		
1927	Hassler Health Farm	San Carlos, California		
1928	King County Tuberculosis Hospital	Seattle, Washington		
1930	Lake View Sanatorium	Madison, Wisconsin		
1933	Sioux San Hospital	Rapid City, South Dakota		
1934	Arizona State Tuberculosis Sanatorium	Tempe, Arizona		
1934	Glenn Dale Hospital	Glenn Dale, Maryland		
1936	Dr. Hudson Sanitarium	Newton County, Arkansas		
1939	University Tuberculosis Hospital	Portland, Oregon		
1940	Edgewood State Hospital	Deer Park, New York		

== See also ==
- History of tuberculosis
