= William Jerome (disambiguation) =

William Jerome was a songwriter.

William Jerome may also refer to:

- William Travers Jerome, US lawyer
- William Jerome (martyr) (died 1540), English Protestant martyr

== See also ==
- William Jerome Coombs, U.S. Representative from New York
