= Oregon State Tuberculosis Hospital =

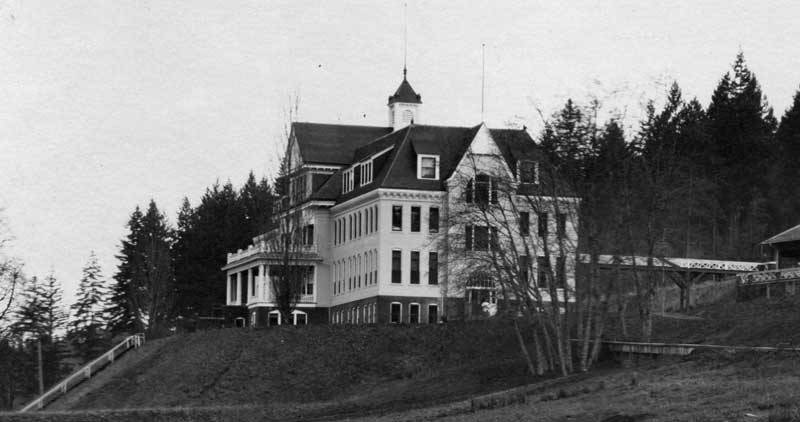
- Oregon State Tuberculosis Hospital c. 1913

Geography
- Location: Salem, Oregon, United States
- Coordinates: 44°52′57″N 122°57′31″W

Organization
- Type: Sanatorium

Services
- Beds: 295

History
- Founded: 1905
- Closed: 1969

Links
- Lists: Hospitals in Oregon

The Oregon State Tuberculosis Hospital was a tuberculosis sanatorium in Salem, Oregon, United States. Established in 1905, it was the first public tuberculosis sanatorium on the West Coast. The main hospital building, constructed in 1894, had formerly housed the Oregon State Deaf-Mute School. After its conversion into the state tuberculosis hospital, multiple cottages and additional buildings were constructed on the property. The hospital remained in operation until 1969, when it was purchased by Corban University.

== History ==
=== Establishment ===
A privately owned tuberculosis sanatorium opened in Milwaukie Heights, Oregon (near Portland) in 1905, but was small and unable to accommodate the influx of tuberculosis patients. The state of Oregon mandated public medical care to tuberculosis patients in 1910, after which patients from the Milwaukie Heights hospital were relocated to the new sanatorium in Salem; the Oregon State Tuberculosis Hospital was established in the former building (constructed in 1894) that had housed the Oregon State Deaf-Mute School from 1896 to 1897.

On November 21, 1910 the first five patients were admitted to the Oregon State Tuberculosis Hospital, which housed a total of fifty beds. H. J. Clement was the hospital's superintendent in 1910 and 1911. Beginning in 1919, three pavilions were constructed on the 149 acres (60 ha) hospital grounds. The addition of cottages on the property increased the hospital bed count to a peak of 295 beds in 1923.

=== Later years and closure ===
In 1934, a third floor was added to the main hospital, followed by a Nurses Home and several Physician Cottages. Due to overcrowding, an additional sanatorium was opened in The Dalles, followed by the University Tuberculosis Hospital in Portland in 1939. The Oregon State Tuberculosis Hospital would remain active after the closure of the University Tuberculosis Hospital in 1963. The hospital officially closed in 1969, after which the hospital buildings and grounds were purchased by Corban University.

== See also ==
- Tuberculosis in the twentieth century
