= University Tuberculosis Hospital =

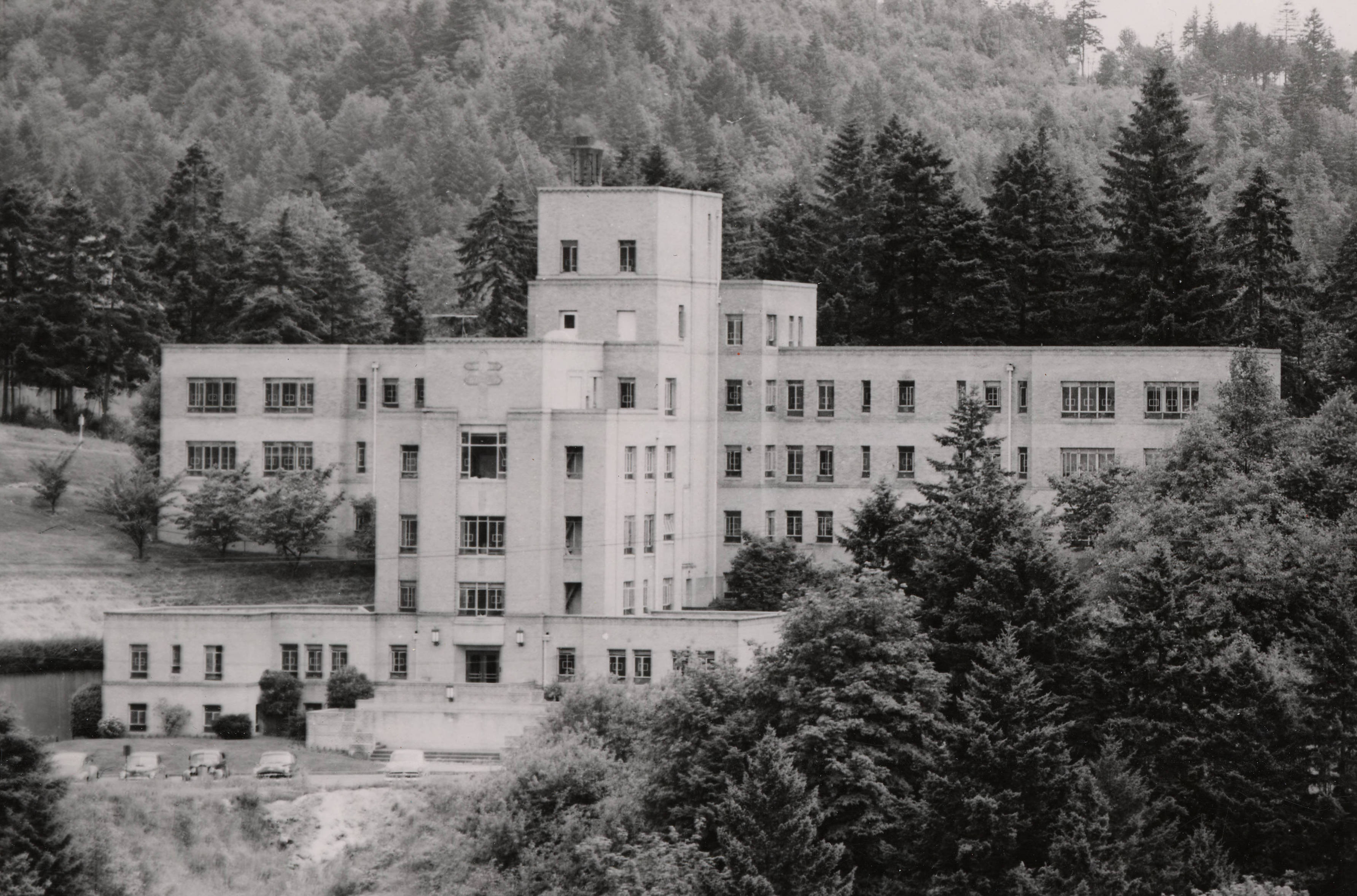
- University Tuberculosis Hospital, 1953

Geography
- Location: Portland, Multnomah County, Oregon, United States

Organization
- Type: Specialist

Services
- Speciality: Tuberculosis Sanatorium

History
- Founded: 1939
- Closed: 1963

Links
- Lists: Hospitals in Oregon

University Tuberculosis Hospital was a sanatorium located on Marquam Hill in Portland, Oregon, United States, established in 1939. The hospital was the third sanatorium to open in the state of Oregon after the state legislature mandated public health care for tuberculosis patients in 1909.

The hospital was active until 1963, when the number of tuberculosis patients in the state had dwindled, and the Oregon State Tuberculosis Hospital in Salem was able to care for those with the disease.

The former hospital is now referred to as the Campus Services Building and is part of the larger campus for Oregon Health & Science University on Marquam Hill.

== See also ==
- List of hospitals in Portland, Oregon
- List of sanatoria in the United States
- Oregon Health & Science University
- Campus Services Building
