= Brooklyn Home for Consumptives =

American tuberculosis sanatorium (est. 1881)

Coordinates: 40.6717°N 73.9426°W

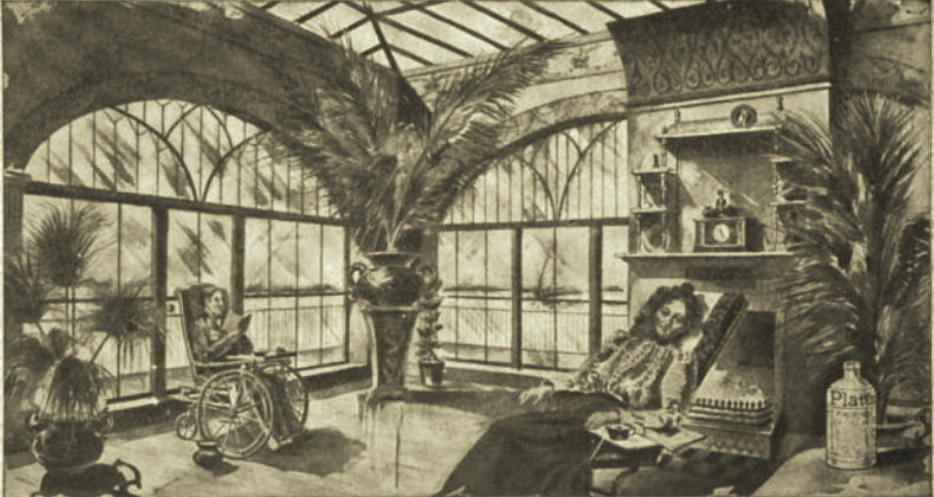
Sun parlor, Brooklyn Home for Consumptives (1899)

Brooklyn Home for Consumptives (previously, Garfield Memorial Home; later, Brooklyn Thoracic Hospital and Brooklyn Hospital; currently, Brooklyn Hospital Center) was an American sanatorium located in Brooklyn, New York. Founded in 1881 as an almshouse, it was a purely benevolent and non-sectarian institution. It had two sections, one of which was attended by homoeopathic physicians and the other by allopathic practitioners, who treated the patients according to their choice. The home went through several changes before becoming the Brooklyn Hospital Center.

== History ==
It was founded on October 6, 1881, under the name of the Garfield Memorial Home as a home to provide shelter and care, especially tuberculosis patients, who were not admissible to hospitals owing to the chronic nature of their ailments. In 1882, it was renamed the Brooklyn Home for Consumptives, and in 1938, it was renamed The Brooklyn Thoracic Hospital. The original location of the Home was 219 Raymond Street. In 1887, it was relocated to a new building on Kingston Avenue, remaining there until closure in 1955. The Brooklyn Thoracic Hospital merged with the Brooklyn Hospital in 1956. By 2010, Brooklyn Hospital's operations were continuing, the institution being known as the Brooklyn Hospital Center.

Of the 151 patients who entered the institution during 1889, 109 were treated by allopathic and 42 were cared for by homeopathic practitioners. A new medical room, which opened in March, was equipped with many new appliances for the cure of consumption, which, the physicians said, had materially aided their efforts to treat the disease. Between October 1888 and October 1889, the number entering the institution was 151, of whom 94 were men and 57 were women. Of this number, 76 were born in the U.S., 14 in England, 26 in Ireland, 14 in Germany, 11 in Sweden, 2 in Norway, 1 in Cuba, 1 in Russia, 1 in Canada, 1 in France, 1 in Italy, 1 in Switzerland, and 2 in China. The daily record of the hospital patients who had been treated gratuitously numbered 16,734. Eliza M. Chandler White was the president.

During 1897, 236 patients were under treatment, 84 of them in the homoeopathic section. Of those treated, 84 died, 39 left improved, and 85 remained in the home.

By 1899, a children's ward had been added. All genders were admitted free of charge, at any stage, even the dying.

In 1909, its address was Kingston Avenue, Sterling and St. Johns Places. The capacity was 115, and during the year, it housed 369 patients. The Home received US$16,900 from the city; total receipts were US$33,811; and the real estate value was US$115,000. At that time, Mrs. W. R. Adams served as president, Mary B. Wardell was Treasurer, and Miss E. P. Smith was the superintendent.

== See also ==
- List of sanatoria in the United States
