= Stephen V. White =

American politician

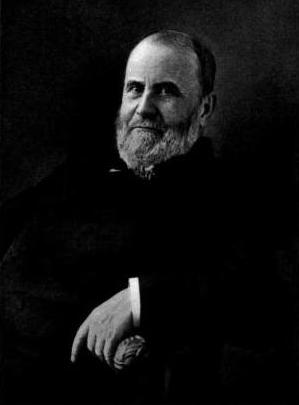

Member of the U.S. House of Representatives from New York
- In office March 4, 1887 – March 3, 1889
- Preceded by: Darwin R. James
- Succeeded by: William C. Wallace
- Constituency: 3rd district (1887–89)

Personal details
- Born: August 1, 1831 Chatham County, North Carolina
- Died: January 18, 1913 (aged 81) Brooklyn, New York
- Party: Republican
- Spouse: Eliza M. Chandler White

Stephen Van Culen White (August 1, 1831 – January 18, 1913) was a U.S. representative from New York.

== Early life and study ==
White was born in Chatham County, North Carolina. His mother, Julia Brewer, was a descendant of Oliver Cromwell and his father, Hiram White, was a local farmer. White moved to Illinois with his parents, who settled near Otterville. The region was largely a wilderness and White spent his childhood working as a trapper, selling animal skins to the American Fur Company.

He attended the first free integrated school in the United States, the Hamilton Primary School founded by Dr. Silas Hamilton in Otterville, and was graduated from Knox College in Galesburg, Illinois. In 1854 he entered a mercantile house in St. Louis, Missouri. White studied law and was admitted to the bar November 4, 1856.

== Professional career ==
White moved to Des Moines, Iowa, in 1856, and practiced law until January 1, 1865, during which time he was Acting United States District Attorney for Iowa in 1864.

White moved to New York City in 1865 and engaged in banking, serving as member of the New York Stock Exchange. He was an astronomer and upon the organization in 1883 of the American Astronomical Society was elected its first president.

== Political career ==
White was elected as a Republican to the Fiftieth Congress (March 4, 1887 – March 3, 1889) from New York's 3rd congressional district. He was not a candidate for renomination in 1888 to the Fifty-first Congress.

White resumed the practice of law. He died in Brooklyn, New York, January 18, 1913 and was interred in Green-Wood Cemetery.

U.S. House of Representatives
Preceded by Darwin R. James	Member of the U.S. House of Representatives from New York's 3rd congressional district 1887–1889	Succeeded by William C. Wallace
