= Darwin R. James =

American politician (1834–1908)

Member of the U.S. House of Representatives from New York's 3rd district
- In office March 4, 1883 – March 3, 1887
- Preceded by: J. Hyatt Smith
- Succeeded by: Stephen V. White

Personal details
- Born: Darwin Rush James; May 14, 1834 Williamsburg, Massachusetts, U.S.
- Died: November 19, 1908 (aged 74) Brooklyn, New York, U.S.
- Party: Republican

Darwin Rush James (May 14, 1834 – November 19, 1908) was a U.S. representative from New York.

Born in Williamsburg, Massachusetts, James pursued an academic course in the Mount Pleasant Boarding School, Amherst, Massachusetts. He moved with his parents to Williamsburg, New York, in 1847. He entered the mercantile business in New York City in 1850, became Secretary of the New York Board of Trade and Transportation, and served as Park commissioner of Brooklyn in 1876–1882.

James was elected as a Republican to the Forty-eighth and Forty-ninth Congresses (March 4, 1883 – March 3, 1887) where he became a staunch supporter of free silver. He declined a renomination to Congress. He served as chairman of United States Board of Indian Commissioners in 1890. He served as member of New York Canal Commission in 1898. He resumed mercantile pursuits. He died in Brooklyn, New York, November 19, 1908. He was interred in the City Cemetery, Williamsburg, Massachusetts.

U.S. House of Representatives
Preceded by J. Hyatt Smith	Member of the U.S. House of Representatives from New York's 3rd congressional district 1883–1887	Succeeded by Stephen V. White
