= Anne Sheldon Coombs =

American novelist

- Born: 1858; Albany
- Died: November 22, 1890; Brooklyn
- Occupation: Writer

Anne Sheldon Coombs (1858 – November 22, 1890) was an American novelist.

She was born in Albany, New York in 1858, the daughter of George W. Sheldon. She was a member of New York City high society and the guests at her 1882 wedding at the Church of the Holy Trinity to Charles Adams Coombs, son of US Congressman William Jerome Coombs, included the Mayor of New York City. An 1889 account gives a glimpse of her life:

She [...] lives in a handsome apartment on Fifth Avenue furnished from the curiosity shops of Europe. She has travelled extensively, and spent nearly all of last year in Italy to find the atmosphere for her next story. She writes only when the mood comes upon her, and does not labor under the daily necessity of turning out so many words in so many hours. [...S]he has a fondness for pink paper, and has fixed her taste upon a peculiarly delicate tint which Tiffany manufactures for her exclusive use.

On November 22, 1890, she committed suicide by jumping from the sixth floor of the Pierrepont House in Brooklyn.

== Bibliography ==
- As Common Mortals (1886)
- A Game of Chance (1887)
- A Speedy Wooing, or The Garden of Armida (1889)
