= Glen Lake Children's Camp =

- U.S. National Register of Historic Places
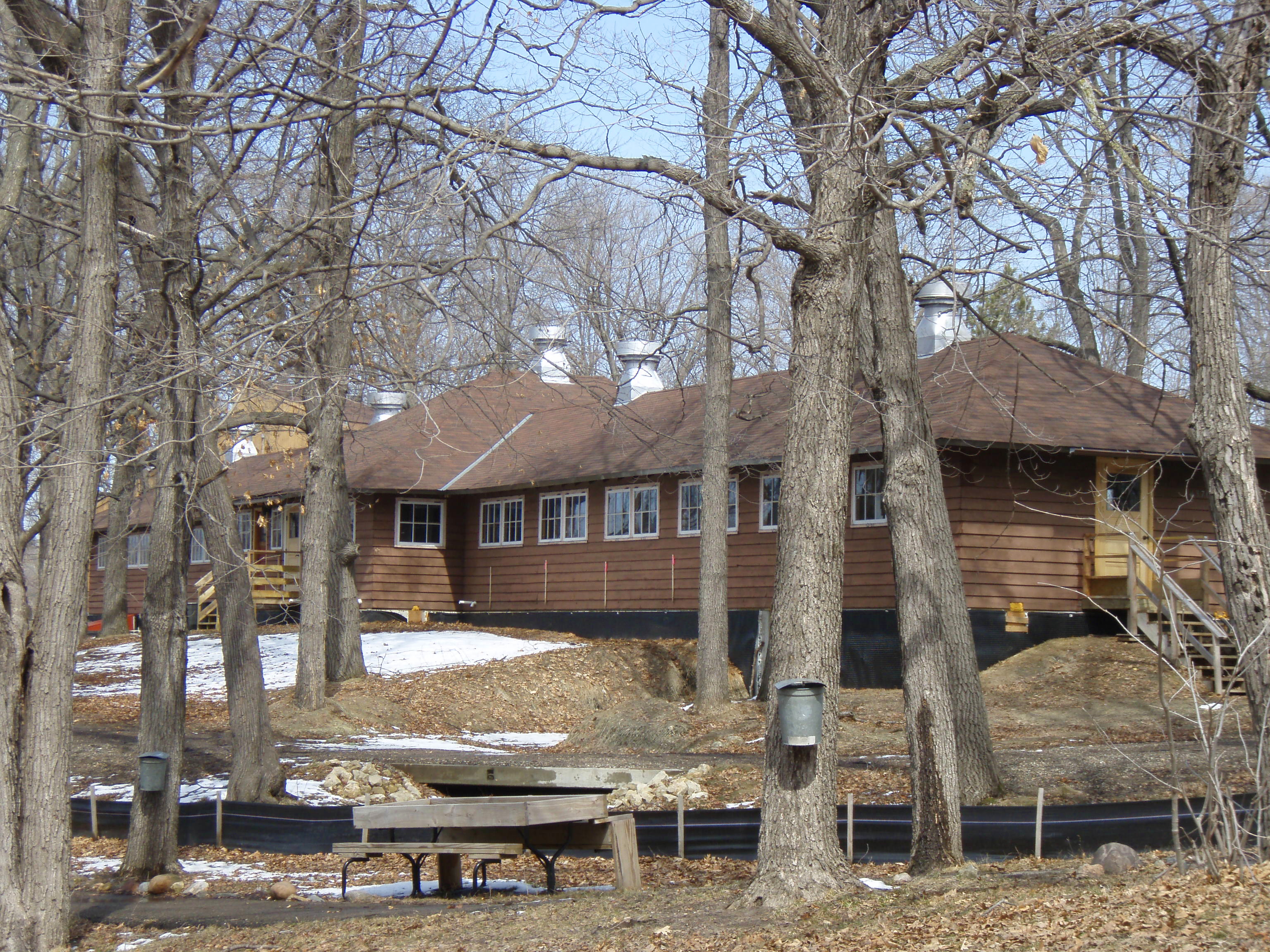
- One of the cabins at Glen Lake Children's Camp.

- Location within Minnesota Location within the United States
- Location: Eden Prairie, Minnesota
- Coordinates: 44°53′16″N 93°27′52″W
- Built: 1925
- Architect: Sund & Dunham
- NRHP reference No.: 99000932
- Added to NRHP: August 5, 1999

Glen Lake Children's Camp is a former children's camp for victims of tuberculosis. The camp was part of the Glen Lake Sanatorium on the border of Minnetonka and Eden Prairie, Minnesota. Although the main sanatorium buildings were demolished in 1993, the children's camp portion remained intact. The camp is Minnesota's only known surviving camp for children who had tuberculosis, and it reflects the philanthropic efforts of its founders, George H. and Leonora Christian. It was listed on the National Register of Historic Places on August 5, 1999.

Tuberculosis was becoming a major health problem in Minnesota around the turn of the 20th century, with more than 20,000 Minnesotans dying of the disease between 1887 and 1899. The Minnesota Legislature created the Minnesota State Sanatorium for Consumptives on Leech Lake near Walker, Minnesota, in 1907. The sanatorium at Leech Lake wasn't able to handle the increasing demand for tuberculosis patients, so the Legislature passed a bill allowing counties to build their own sanatoria. Hennepin County began construction of the Glen Lake Sanatorium in 1914, and it opened in 1916.

The children's camp was established by George H. and Leonora Christian. George H. Christian was a flour buyer who partnered with Governor Cadwallader C. Washburn. Leonora dedicated herself to the fight against tuberculosis, and in 1906, she established a summer camp in Minneapolis for children with tuberculosis. The camp moved to Glenwood Park (now Theodore Wirth Park) in 1909, staffed by the Visiting Nurses Association. In 1925, the Visiting Nurses Association determined that they could no longer operate the camp. The Children's Aid Society, a foundation established by George H. Christian in 1916, offered to build a permanent children's camp. Glen Lake Sanatorium was willing to provide land and management. Glen Lake Children's Camp opened on June 12, 1925.

When antibiotic treatments became available for tuberculosis in the 1940s, the era of tuberculosis treatment began to draw to a close. The children's camp ceased operation in 1950, and the Leech Lake Sanatorium closed in 1962 and transferred its patients to Glen Lake. The last tuberculosis patient was discharged in 1976. The sanatorium complex, with the exception of the children's camp, was demolished in 1993. In 1997, most of the land became the Glen Lake Golf and Practice Center operated by Three Rivers Park District. The children's camp is still in operation, leased to True Friends and operated by Eden Wood Center.
