= Karl Von Ruck =

American physician (1849–1922)

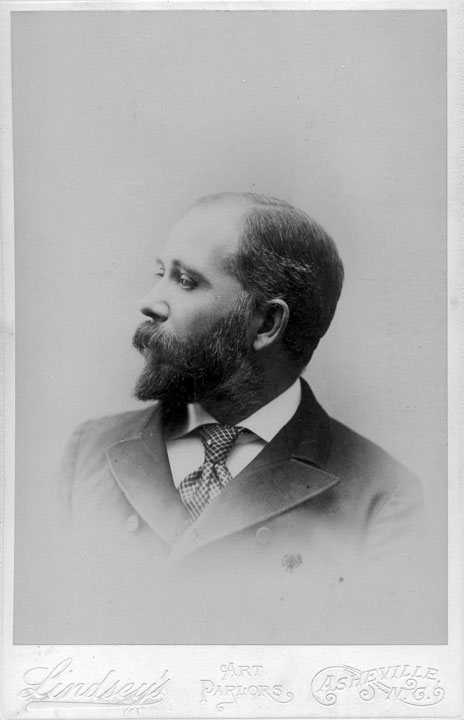
- Born: Karl von Ruck; July 10, 1849; Constantinople, Ottoman Empire
- Died: November 5, 1922; Asheville, North Carolina, U.S.

Karl von Ruck (July 10, 1849 – November 5, 1922) was a physician, medical researcher, and founder of a prominent early tuberculosis sanitarium in the United States in Asheville, North Carolina.

== Early life and education ==
Karl Von Ruck was born the son of a diplomat in Constantinople in 1849. He grew up in Württemberg and attended the nearby University of Stuttgart, where he received a B.S. in 1867. Though his studies were interrupted by the Franco-Prussian war, he did receive a medical degree from the University of Tübingen and migrated to Ohio, US. In 1879, he also received a medical degree from the University of Michigan.

== Career ==
After his graduation, he set up a medical practice in Norwalk, Ohio. In 1883, he traveled to Europe to visit medical schools in several capitals and served as "a pupil in Dr. [Robert] Koch's laboratory in Berlin." Koch, the Nobel-prize winning researcher and pioneer of bacteriology, had identified the pathogen tubercle bacillus as the cause of tuberculosis just the year before.

From 1886 to 1888, Von Ruck operated a private hospital in Norwalk, including for treatment of lung diseases. In 1888, hearing of the salubrity of the climate being similar being similar to that around health sanitaria emerging in Germany, he and his family relocated to Asheville, NC, to open a his new health resort that he advertised as a sanitarium, "Winyah House." Winyah Sanitarium is recognized as the first large sustained private treatment institutions in the United States for tuberculosis patients. At the sanitarium, von Ruck provided treatments for TB-infected patients as he searched for a cure.

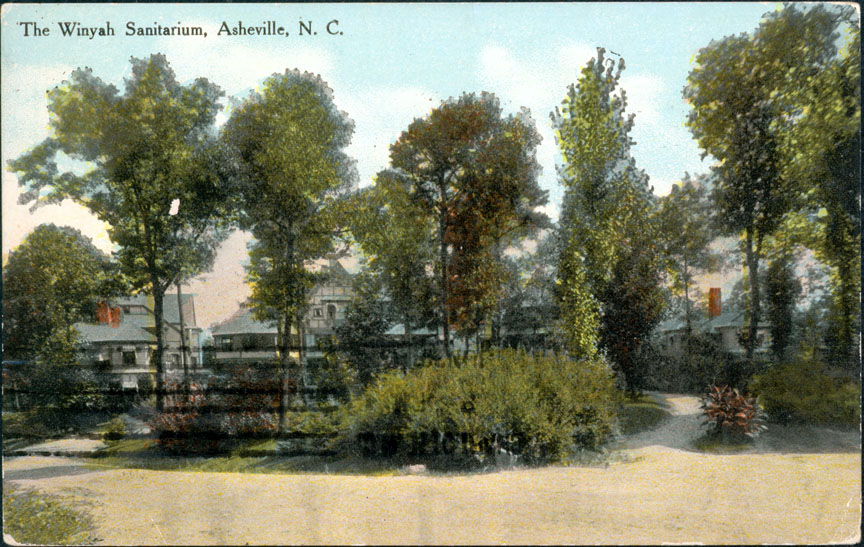
Winyah Sanitarium

Von Ruck established a research laboratory in 1895. As author David Freedman noted: "The Von Ruck Research Laboratory for Tuberculosis produced more than 50 papers from 1890 to 1930, published mostly in the Journal of the American Medical Association and the Journal of Immunology. These included pioneering immunotherapy studies with tuberculin variants (made from components of the bacterium) and the first robust description of the antigenic profile of Mycobacterium tuberculosis."

Von Ruck succeeded in producing a vaccine, a watery extract of tubercle bacilli, and published the results of mostly uncontrolled studies in the Journal of the American Medical Association paper (1912) entitled "A Practical Method of Prophylactic Immunization against Tuberculosis." Von Ruck watery extract was rejected for general use by the U.S. Public Health Service after a US Senate investigation of his methods in 1914. One contributing factor according to Subjected to Science: Human Experimentation in America Before the Second World War, was that as part of his widespread clinical trials, Von Ruck tested the vaccine on 262 children in a local orphanage. Von Ruck's results were also criticized by his contemporaries, including an R. S. Cummings from California, who described an experiment undertaken with the same vaccine that resulted in guinea pigs inoculated with von Ruck's extract becoming more susceptible to TB, rather than less so. Efforts by other researchers at the time using live bacilli were markedly more successful than those with dead bacilli.

World War I then intervened, slowing Von Ruck's continued work, and then live attenuated bacille Calmette–Guerin arrived from France in 1921 as a prophylactic vaccine and superseded for many decades further development of nonlive or subunit tuberculosis vaccines either for preventive or therapeutic use.

Von Ruck and his son co-edited the first US medical journal devoted entirely to TB, Journal of Tuberculosis: A Quarterly Magazine Devoted to the Prevention and Treatment of Tuberculosis, from 1899 to 1903, and co-authored the first US book devoted entirely to vaccination against TB, Studies in Immunization Against Tuberculosis (1916).

== Personal life ==
Von Ruck married Adelia (Delia) Moore, a student at Oberlin College, in 1872. Their son, Silvio, was born in 1875, followed by daughter, Calla, in 1877. His son became a frequent collaborator and eventually took over daily operations of the sanitarium in 1902. Silvio Von Ruck died in 1918 during the influenza pandemic, as did his daughter, Karl Von Ruck's only granddaughter.

== Death and legacy ==
After Von Ruck's death, the laboratory, which had been endowed by Von Ruck, and the sanitarium, under the direction of its staff, continued to operate for a few years. The sanitarium and research lab played important roles in establishing Asheville as a leading center for TB convalescence and treatment. In addition, in the 1920s the laboratory also "became a magnet for early-career researchers" such as noted immunologist Jules Freund, and continued operations until 1933. Even now, over 100 years later, live bacille Calmette–Guerin and its engineered variants, the only available TB vaccines, using the original backbone and incorporating recombinant subunits continue to struggle for reproducible success in tuberculosis prevention, especially in adolescents and adults. Nonlive vaccine candidates containing recombinant subunits alone in combination with a strong T-cell–stimulating adjuvant are once again in the pipeline, a now recognized result of the early work done in Asheville.

Von Ruck's extensive card catalogue, which was derived from his large library on world literature on tuberculosis and much of which at that time was in German, was purchased after his death by the Army Medical Library, then America's largest medical reference resource.
