= Corban University =

Christian university in Salem, Oregon, US

- Former names: Phoenix Bible Institute (1935–1946); Western Baptist Bible College (1946–1978); Western Baptist College (1978–2005); Corban College (2005–2007); Corban College and Graduate School (2007–2010)
- Motto: Educating Christians to make a difference in the world for Jesus Christ
- Type: Private
- Established: 1935; 91 years ago
- Founder: Roy O. Bancroft
- Accreditation: NCCU
- Religious affiliation: Christian
- Academic affiliations: CCCU
- Budget: $38,000,000
- Chairman: Rod Hoff
- President: John Mark Yeats
- Provost: Aaron Imig
- Academic staff: 43 (full-time)
- Administrative staff: 120
- Students: 2,282 (2021-2022)
- Undergraduates: 918
- Other students: 1,600
- Location: Salem, Oregon, United States; 44°52′57″N 122°57′31″W
- Campus: 205 acres; Suburban, 222 acres (90 ha)
- Colors: Navy Blue & Gold
- Nickname: Warriors
- Sporting affiliations: NAIA – CCC
- Mascot: Cadmar the Warrior
- Website: corban.edu
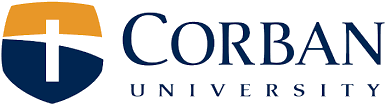

Corban University is a private Christian university in Salem, Oregon, United States. There are about 1,000 full-time students enrolled on the Salem campus and 2,800 worldwide. Athletically, it is a member of the National Association of Intercollegiate Athletics competing in the Cascade Collegiate Conference.

== History ==
The institution was established in 1935 in Phoenix, Arizona, as the "Phoenix Bible Institute" by Evangelist Leland Entrekin and Roy Bancroft. The college moved in 1946 to Oakland, California, and took the name "Western Baptist Bible College", affiliated with the General Association of Regular Baptist Churches (GARBC). In 1969, the college moved to Salem, Oregon. In July 1969, the administrators paid $5,000 as a down payment for the 100-acre campus. The down payment was then adopted as the college's new address: 5000 Deer Park Drive. The transaction was personally overseen and signed by then Oregon Governor Tom McCall.

The school shortened its name to "Western Baptist College" in 1978. In the 1970s, Western added liberal arts to its ministry programs. Thomas Younger, the college's sixth president, helped institute the School of Education and the School of Business. Reno Hoff became the president of the institution in 1999, replacing David Miller. In 2001, Beth Bartosik became the first Fulbright Scholar in school history. Corban received a $2.1 million donation in 2001 for a new performing arts center and chapel, the largest donation ever for the school.

In 2004, U.S. News & World Report ranked the school as the eighth best in the western United States for comprehensive colleges, and ninth the following year. The college name was changed from Western Baptist College to "Corban College" on May 7, 2005. "Corban," a Hebrew word, means "a gift dedicated to God." Later in 2005 the college opened Davidson Hall, a residence hall, and had their largest incoming class to that point with 207 freshman and an overall enrollment of 860. In 2006, U.S. News & World Report listed the school at eight, the fifth year in a row the school was in the top ten. As of 2009, the college had an endowment of about $3 million. In 2013, U.S. News Best Colleges listed Corban in its Top 10 for the West for the 13th year in a row. The university was ranked as the fifth best among western regional colleges by U.S. News & World Report in 2016.

Students are required to provide testimony of their relationship with Jesus Christ in their application to Corban. In the summer of 2007, Corban's name was extended to "Corban College and Graduate School" in order to reflect the institution's graduate programs in education and business. In honor of the institution's 75th anniversary, it became Corban University on May 1, 2010.

== Academics ==
The university contains four schools and two academic departments: the Department of Humanities, the Department of Math and Sciences, Hoff School of Business, School of Education, School of Ministry, and School of Social Sciences. Corban offers over 50 undergraduate programs and 10 graduate programs. All Corban undergraduate students, regardless of major, take a minimum of 12-semester units of Bible and theology classes. All courses are taught from a biblical perspective.

== Campus ==
Corban's campus is on a wooded hillside on the outskirts of Salem, and the college owns approximately 220 acres (0.89 km^{2}) of the wooded hillside. The site was previously the site of the Oregon Institute for Deaf-Mutes and then the Oregon State Tuberculosis Hospital. Some buildings on campus date to those facilities. Over one hundred bird species have been identified on campus. The school also operated the Corban School of Ministry in Tacoma, Washington, after the Northwest Baptist Seminary was merged with Corban in 2010.

=== Residence halls ===
Freshmen and sophomores, unless over the age of 21, married, or commuting, must live on campus. There are four residence halls: Aagard, Prewitt/Van Gilder, Balyo, and Davidson. There are also townhouses on the campus for academic juniors and seniors.

=== Performing Arts Center ===
Also on campus is the 700-seat Psalm Performing Arts Center opened in 2005 at a cost of $3.7 million. The building also houses practice rooms and classrooms for performing arts majors.

=== Academic buildings ===
The campus' main academic building, the Academic Center, houses the university's 80,000+ volume library. The library also has study rooms and conference rooms available to students throughout the day, along with multiple study areas and computer labs with free printing. Additionally, the library houses the Prewitt-Allen Archaeological Museum, with over 900 artifacts and replicas from the Middle East and Greece. The collection also contains authentic scrolls of the Torah, the first five books of the Bible.

The university rarely holds classes over 50 students, with a student to faculty ratio of 17:1. Traditional classrooms and small lecture halls are found around campus in Caulkins Hall, the David F. Miller Pavilion, Schimmel Hall, C.E. Jeffers Sports Center, Psalm Performing Arts Center, and the Younger Center. The Younger Center also houses additional study areas for students, a tutoring center, and the university Student Support Center.

=== Administration ===
The university holds most administrative offices in Schimmel Hall, a three-story building built in the late 19th century. The Office of the President, the Office of the Provost, along with academic services, financial services, enrollment, and marketing offices are all found in this building.

=== Gallery ===
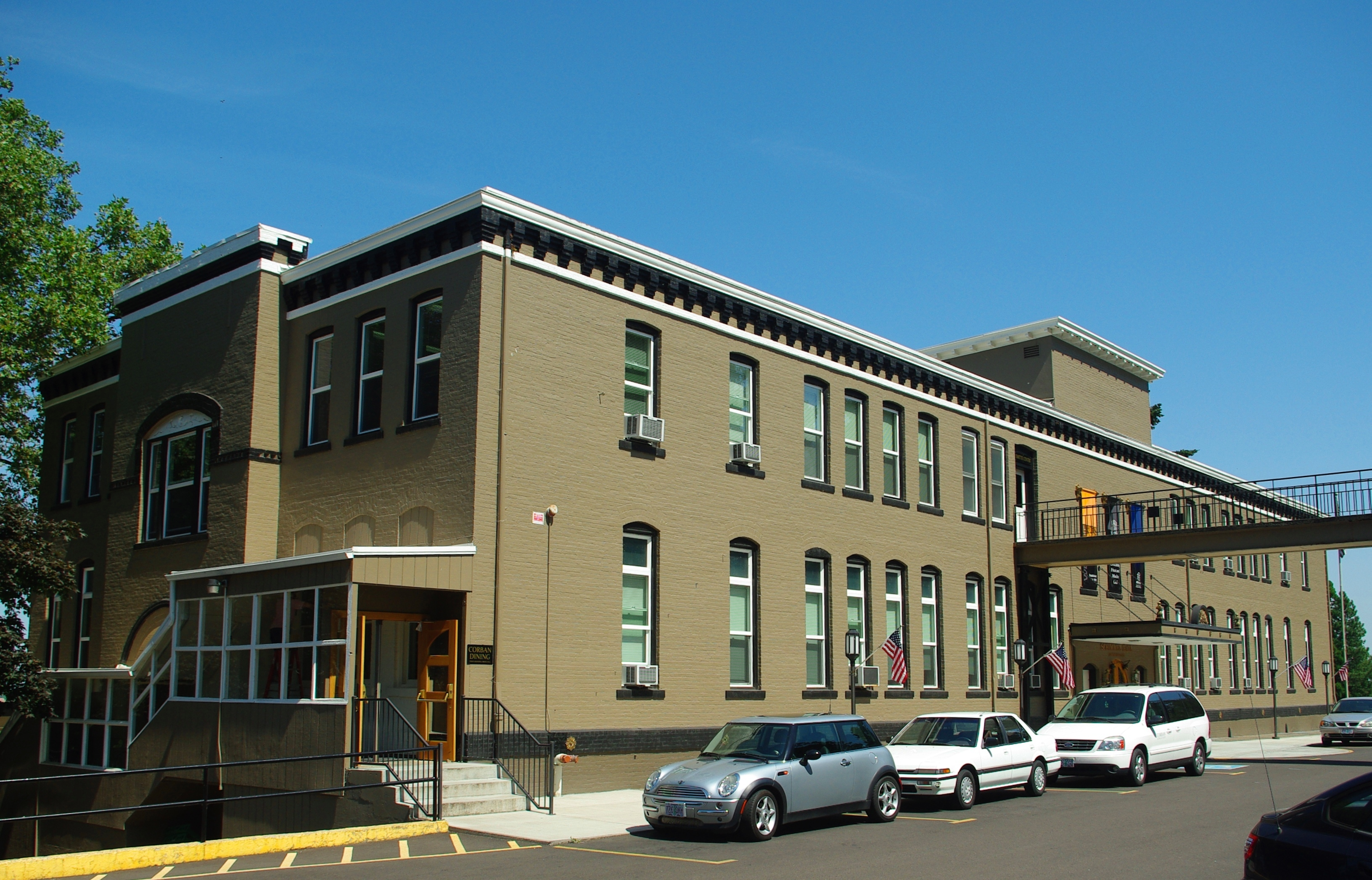
Schimmel Hall

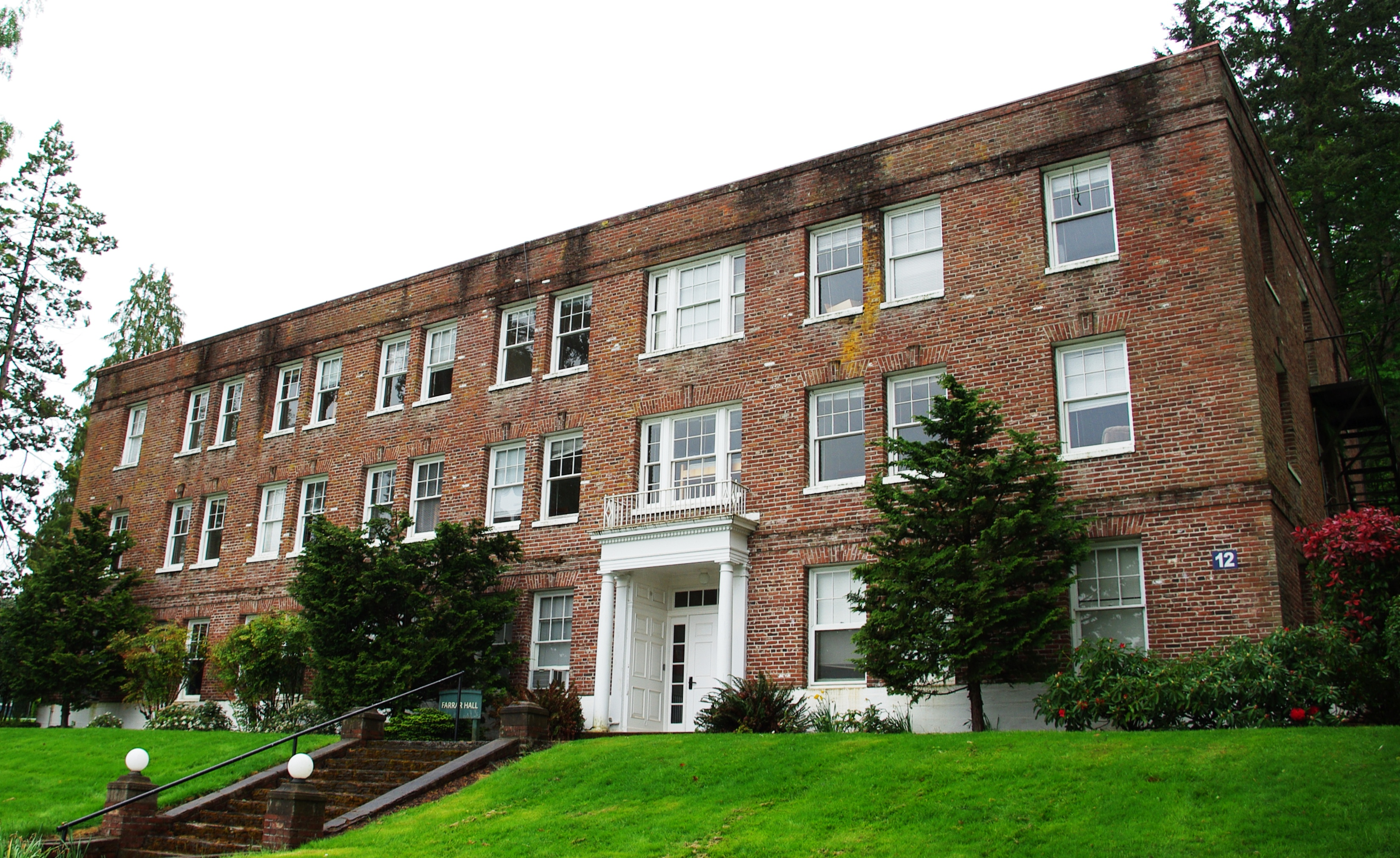
Residence Hall

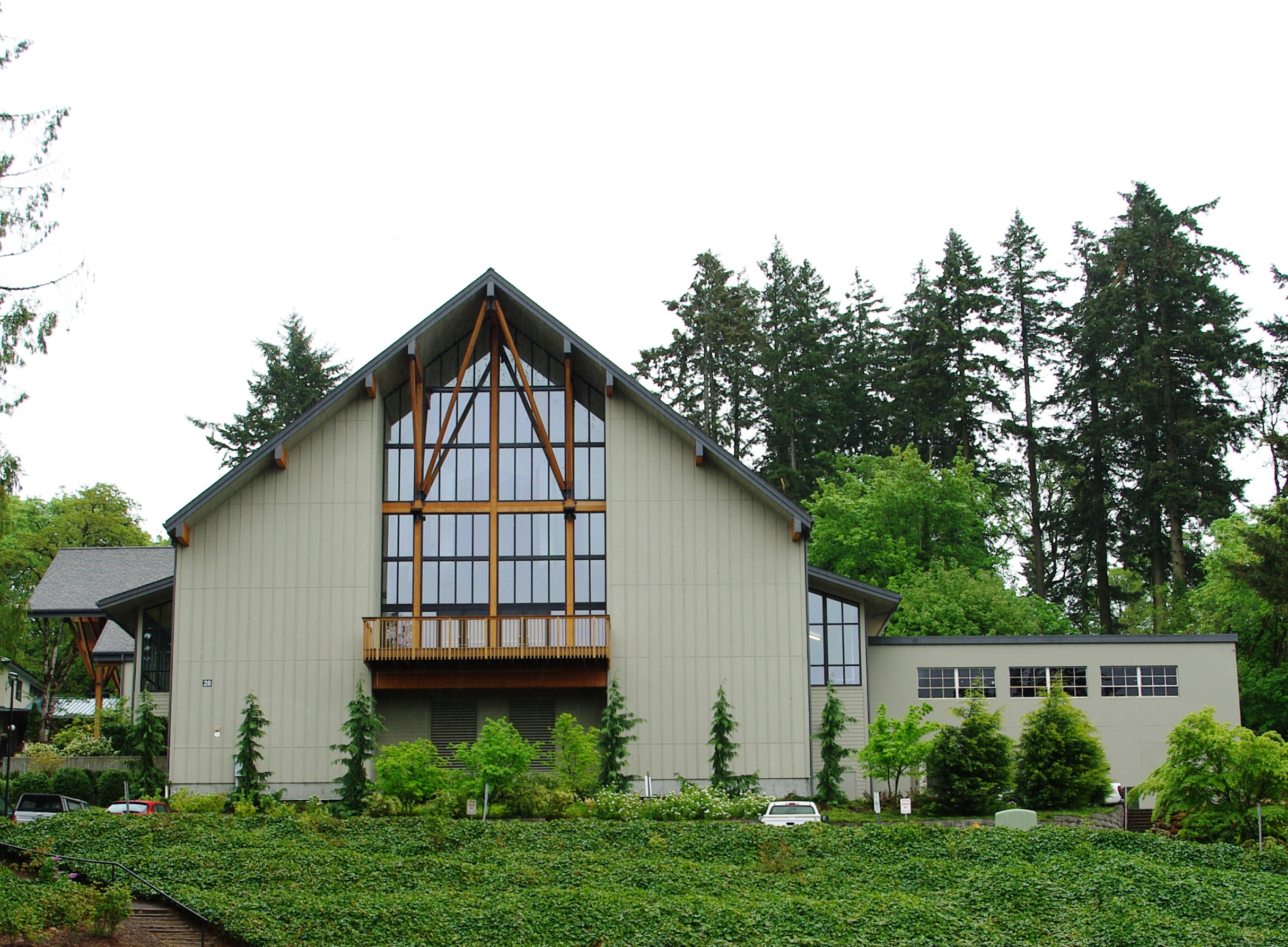
Psalm Performing Arts Center

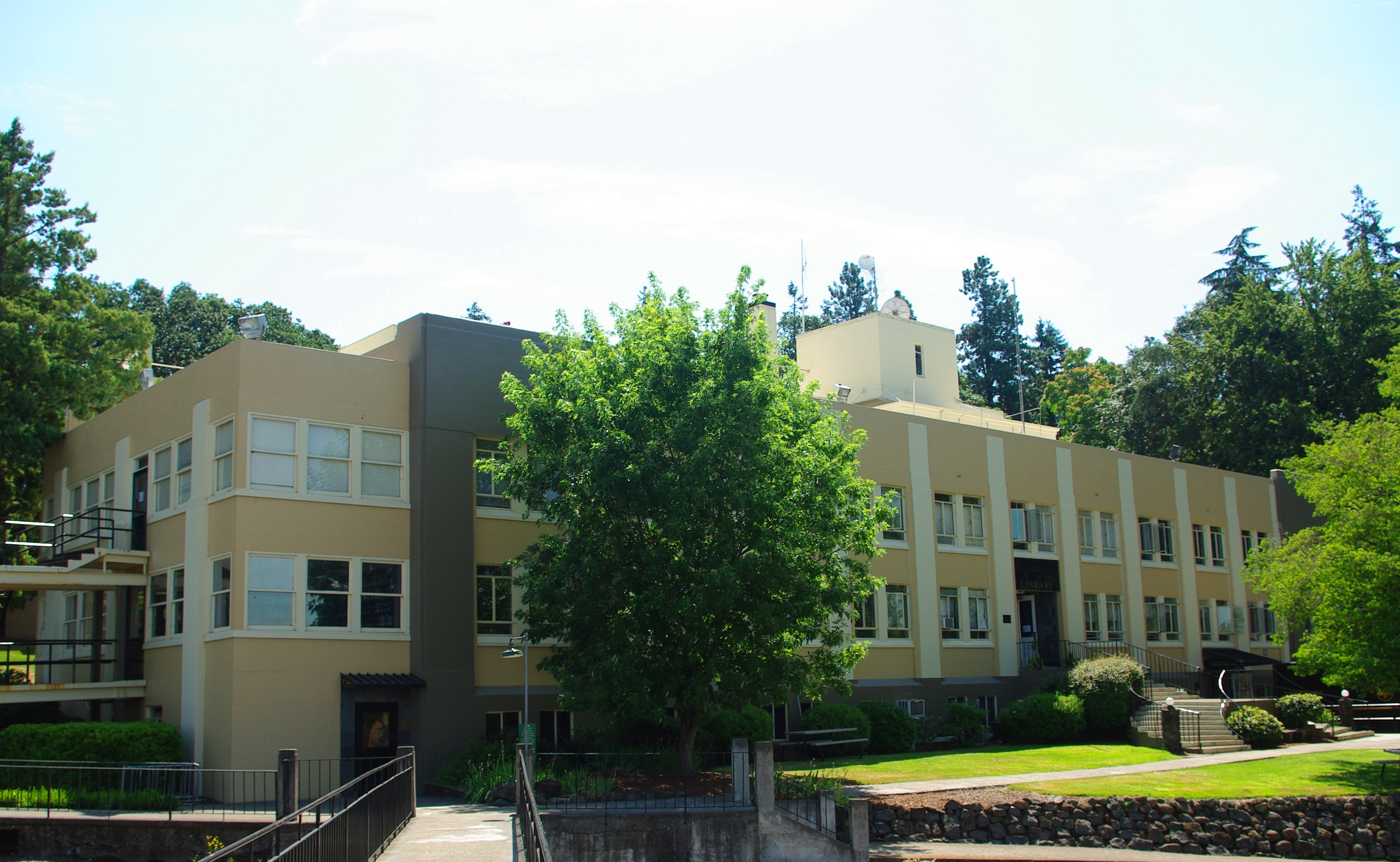
Corban University Library

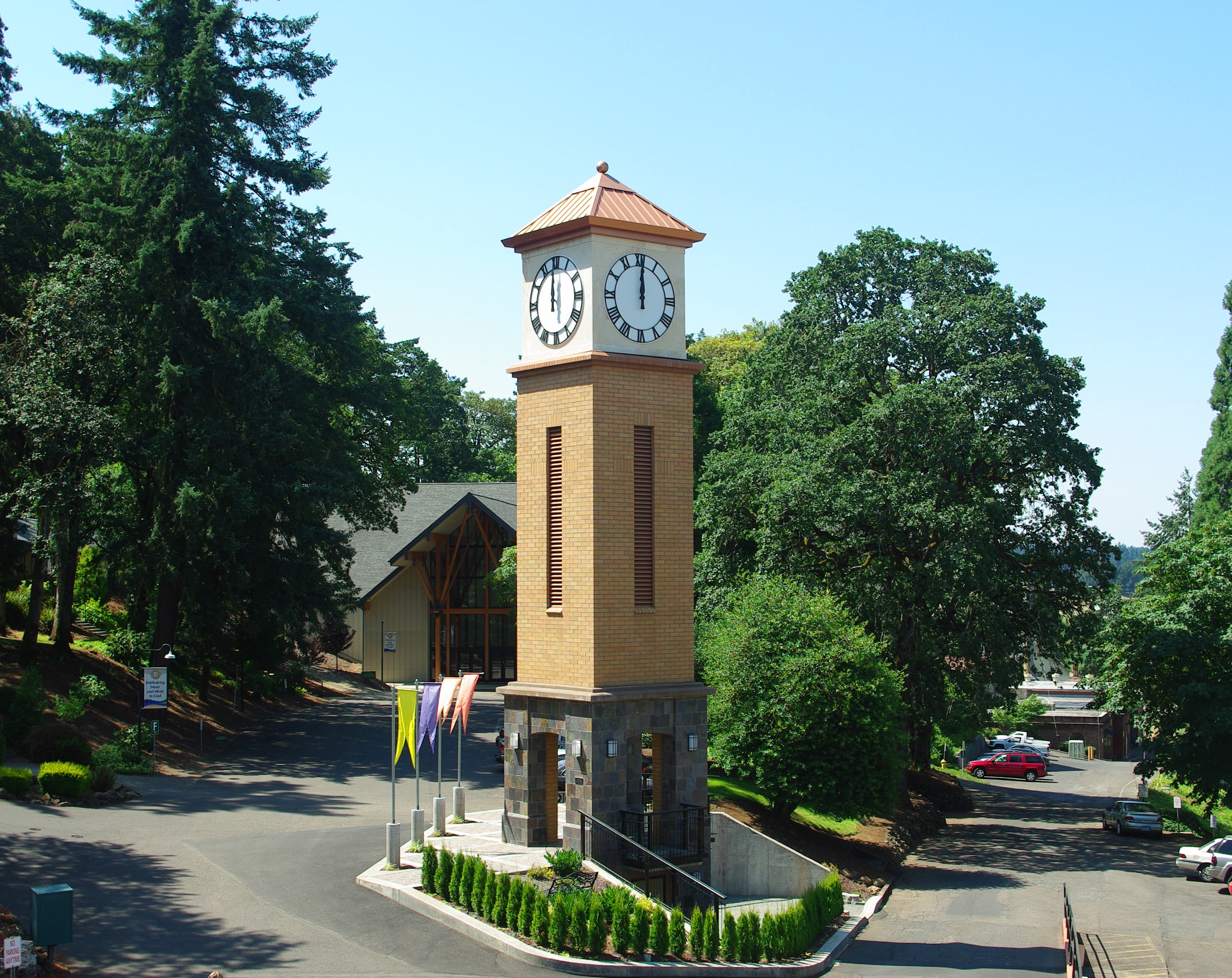
Clock tower

== Athletics ==
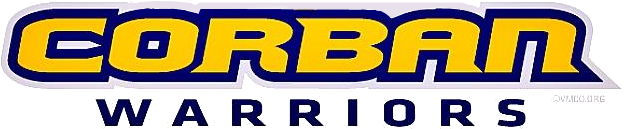
Corban athletics wordmark

The Corban athletic teams are called the Warriors. The university is a member of the National Association of Intercollegiate Athletics (NAIA), primarily competing in the Cascade Collegiate Conference (CCC) since the 1993–94 academic year.

Corban competes in 16 intercollegiate varsity sports: Men's sports include baseball, basketball, cross country, golf, soccer, track & field and wrestling; while women's sports include basketball, beach volleyball, cross country, golf, soccer, softball, track & field and volleyball. The school colors are navy and gold.

=== Facilities ===
The C. E. Jeffers Sports Center is a multi-purpose 1,600 seat sports arena in Salem, Oregon which is home to the Corban Warriors. It was opened in 1978 and houses the basketball, volleyball, and wrestling teams. The student section, the "Barracks", is small but passionate. The building's namesake, Clarence E. Jeffers, was a Corban graduate, sports fanatic, and building contractor. The building also contains the campus' fitness center, a classroom, and coach and athletic trainer offices.

On the southeast side of campus is the beach volleyball courts, home to practices and games of the Corban women's beach volleyball teams.

The Outdoor Athletic Complex, which was to be completed in Spring of 2022, is the new home of the university's track, cross country, soccer, and lacrosse teams. The $4 million project, raised entirely from donations, features a state-of-the-art track and field complex, lighting, and drainage for future expansions.

== Notable alumni ==
- Patrick Daka, soccer player
- Elizabeth Halseth, former Nevada State Senator
- Frank Prewitt, American attorney
- Steve Reese, American soccer player
- Sherrie Sprenger, former member of the Oregon House of Representatives
