= Otterville, Illinois =

Otterville
- Town
- Location of Otterville in Jersey County, Illinois.
- Coordinates: 39°03′03″N 90°23′54″W
- Country: United States
- State: Illinois
- County: Jersey
- Township: Otter Creek
- Incorporated: March 7, 1867

Area
  - Total: 1.01 sq mi (2.61 km^{2})
  - Land: 1.01 sq mi (2.61 km^{2})
  - Water: 0 sq mi (0.00 km^{2})
- Elevation: 623 ft (190 m)

Population (2020)
  - Total: 87
  - Density: 86.5/sq mi (33.39/km^{2})
- Time zone: UTC-6 (CST)
  - Summer (DST): UTC-5 (CDT)
- Zip code: 62052
- Area code: 618
- FIPS code: 17-56978
- GNIS feature ID: 2396842

Otterville is an incorporated town in Jersey County, Illinois, United States. As of the 2020 census, the town had a total population of 87.

== History ==
Otterville is the home of the first free integrated school in the United States, the Hamilton Primary School, located on Main Street. In 1834, Dr. Silas Hamilton, a local physician, left $4,000 for the construction and operation of a building for educational and religious purposes. A stone-built school was opened in 1836, and the tuition-free education for local students attracted families to the area. The school was razed in 1872, and was rebuilt and enlarged, with the original stones at the base. Classes were held at the school until 1971. George Washington, a slave freed by Dr. Hamilton, studied here, became successful, and established a perpetual scholarship fund for Americans of African descent. He also provided for the erection of a monument to his former master at the school.

The school was placed on the National Register of Historic Places in 1998.

== Geography ==
According to the 2021 census gazetteer files, Otterville has a total area of 1.01 square miles (2.62 km^{2}), all land.

== Demographics ==
Historical population
Census	Pop.	Note	%±
1880	223		—
1890	173		−22.4%
1900	208		20.2%
1910	179		−13.9%
1920	150		−16.2%
1930	94		−37.3%
1940	110		17.0%
1950	118		7.3%
1960	140		18.6%
1970	142		1.4%
1980	146		2.8%
1990	115		−21.2%
2000	120		4.3%
2010	126		5.0%
2020	87		−31.0%
U.S. Decennial Census

As of the 2020 census there were 87 people, 80 households, and 77 families residing in the town. The population density was 86.48 inhabitants per square mile (33.39/km^{2}). There were 48 housing units at an average density of 47.71 per square mile (18.42/km^{2}). The racial makeup of the town was 94.25% White, 0.00% African American, 0.00% Native American, 3.45% Asian, 0.00% Pacific Islander, 0.00% from other races, and 2.30% from two or more races. Hispanic or Latino of any race were 1.15% of the population.

There were 80 households, out of which 11.3% had children under the age of 18 living with them, 80.00% were married couples living together, 16.25% had a female householder with no husband present, and 3.75% were non-families. 3.75% of all households were made up of individuals, and 0.00% had someone living alone who was 65 years of age or older. The average household size was 2.49 and the average family size was 2.44.

The town's age distribution consisted of 17.9% under the age of 18, 2.6% from 18 to 24, 17.4% from 25 to 44, 14.8% from 45 to 64, and 47.2% who were 65 years of age or older. The median age was 59.5 years. For every 100 females, there were 99.0 males. For every 100 females age 18 and over, there were 100.0 males.

The median income for a household in the town was $53,264, and the median income for a family was $53,160. Males had a median income of $37,250 versus $19,688 for females. The per capita income for the town was $22,786. About 10.4% of families and 21.0% of the population were below the poverty line, including 94.3% of those under age 18 and none of those age 65 or over.

== Notable people ==
- John B. Hamilton, (1847–1898) served as the U.S. Surgeon General from 1879 to 1891
- Stephen V. White, (1831–1913) US congressman from New York
