= Eliza M. Chandler White =

American charity work leader

Eliza M. Chandler White (May 1, 1831 – June 2, 1907) was an American social reformer and charity work leader, as well as an abolitionist, and clubwoman. She founded the Brooklyn Home for Consumptives, and the Fort Greene Chapter (Brooklyn, New York) of the Daughters of the American Revolution (D.A.R.). She was also the head of the Prison Ship Martyrs Committee which erected the Prison Ship Martyrs' Monument in Fort Greene Park, Brooklyn. She was one of the best-known women of Brooklyn in her day.

== Early life and education ==
Eliza Matilda Chandler was born in Marietta, Ohio, May 1, 1831. Her parents were Hiram and Juliana (Humiston) Chandler. Her father was a descendant of Captain Myles Standish, who came to Plymouth, Massachusetts, on the Mayflower in 1620, and his wife, Barbara. Their son, Alexander, married Sarah, the daughter of John and Priscilla (Mullins) Alden, both Mayflower Pilgrims. Elizabeth, the daughter of Alexander and Sarah Standish, married Samuel Delano and their daughter, Elizabeth, was the wife of Joseph Chandler, 3d. Their son, Benjamin Chandler (killed at the Battle of Bennington, Vermont), and his wife, Elizabeth Jeffries, were the parents of Joseph Chandler, who married Patient Mary Andrews, and their son was Hiram Chandler, born in Vermont, September 4, 1797. Juliana Humiston, Hiram Chandler's wife, was born April 24, 1803. She was descended from Matthias Hitchcock, one of the founders of New Haven, Connecticut, who came from England to Boston, Massachusetts, on the Susan and Ellen in 1635. His son, John Hitchcock, married Abigail Merriman. They were the parents of Matthias, who married Thankful Andrews, and the grandparents of Hannah Hitchcock, whose husband was James Humiston of New Haven, Connecticut, the son of Henry Humiston. Jason Humiston, the son of James and Hannah, married Amy Peck, and they were the parents of Juliana, the wife of Hiram Chandler.

Eliza's home was at Otter Creek Township, LaSalle County, Illinois while she was a student at Monticello Seminary, Godfrey, Illinois, class of 1852.

== Career ==
She taught school until her marriage on February 24, 1857, at Grafton, Illinois, to Stephen Van Culen White, a lawyer who attained wide prominence in his profession and was, during the latter part of his life, an influential member of the New York Stock Exchange.

During their early married life, Mr. and Mrs. White lived in Missouri at a time when the question of slavery was causing much excitement and public feeling. Mrs. White favored the abolition of slavery and strove personally to raise the educational status of the African Americans by teaching reading to all whom she could. She bravely persisted in her teaching, although at the time, it was a prison offense in Missouri. The pleasure in helping, in a practical way, the downtrodden and the needy characterized Mrs. White's entire life.

After a short period of residence in Des Moines, Iowa, Mr. and Mrs. White moved to Brooklyn, and Mrs. White continued to be among the first to aid any worthy charity.

In 1881, she founded the Brooklyn Home for Consumptives, and, assisted by her husband, raised the greater part of its endowment fund of US$100,000. At the time of her death in 1907, the institution owned its own spacious grounds and buildings and was caring for more than 110 men, women, and children.

White's ability to give practical assistance was also evidenced in the many forms of patriotic work in which she engaged. When, in 1858, the Mount Vernon Ladies' Association of the Union was formed to purchase Mount Vernon as a national monument, Mrs. White worked for several years to aid in raising the fund. She was the founder of the Fort Greene Chapter (Brooklyn) of the D.A.R., which grew to have a membership of over 200, and was the organization's Regent at her death. She was also at the head of the Prison Ship Martyrs Committee of the National Society of the D.A.R., and with the aid of her husband secured an appropriation from New York State and another from the United States government, and received a sufficient sum by private subscriptions, to erect the Prison Ship Martyrs' Monument in Fort Greene Park, Brooklyn, New York.

She was one of the incorporators and served as vice-president of the Home for Friendless Women and Children. She was a member of the General Society of Mayflower Descendants, the Colonial Daughters of the Seventeenth Century, the Woman's Auxiliary of the Society for the Preserving and Marking of Historic Sites, and many other patriotic and literary societies.

== Personal life ==
Mr. and Mrs. White were the parents of two children: Jennie Chandler White, who married Franklin W. Hopkins of Alpine, New Jersey (born in Des Moines, Iowa, March 10, 1860), and Arthur White (born in Brooklyn, New York, August 2, 1865). Their son married a granddaughter of Henry Ward Beecher.

She and her husband joined Plymouth Church in 1865.

Early in the winter of 1907, she had a serious attack of pneumonia, and complications that followed this illness were the cause of her death, June 2, 1907.

== Selected works ==
- A Plea for a Monument to the Martyrs of the War of the Revolution: Read Before the National Congress of Daughters of the American Revolution, in Washington, D.C., Feb. 21, 1896 (1896) (text)

=== Editor ===
- Diary of Captain Jabez Fitch. A narrative of the treatment with which the American prisoners were used, who were taken by the British & Hessian troops on Long Island, York Island &c. 1776 (New York, 1897) (text)
