= Glen Lake Sanatorium =

Hospital in Minnesota, United States

Coordinates: 44.8930191°N 93.4643973°W

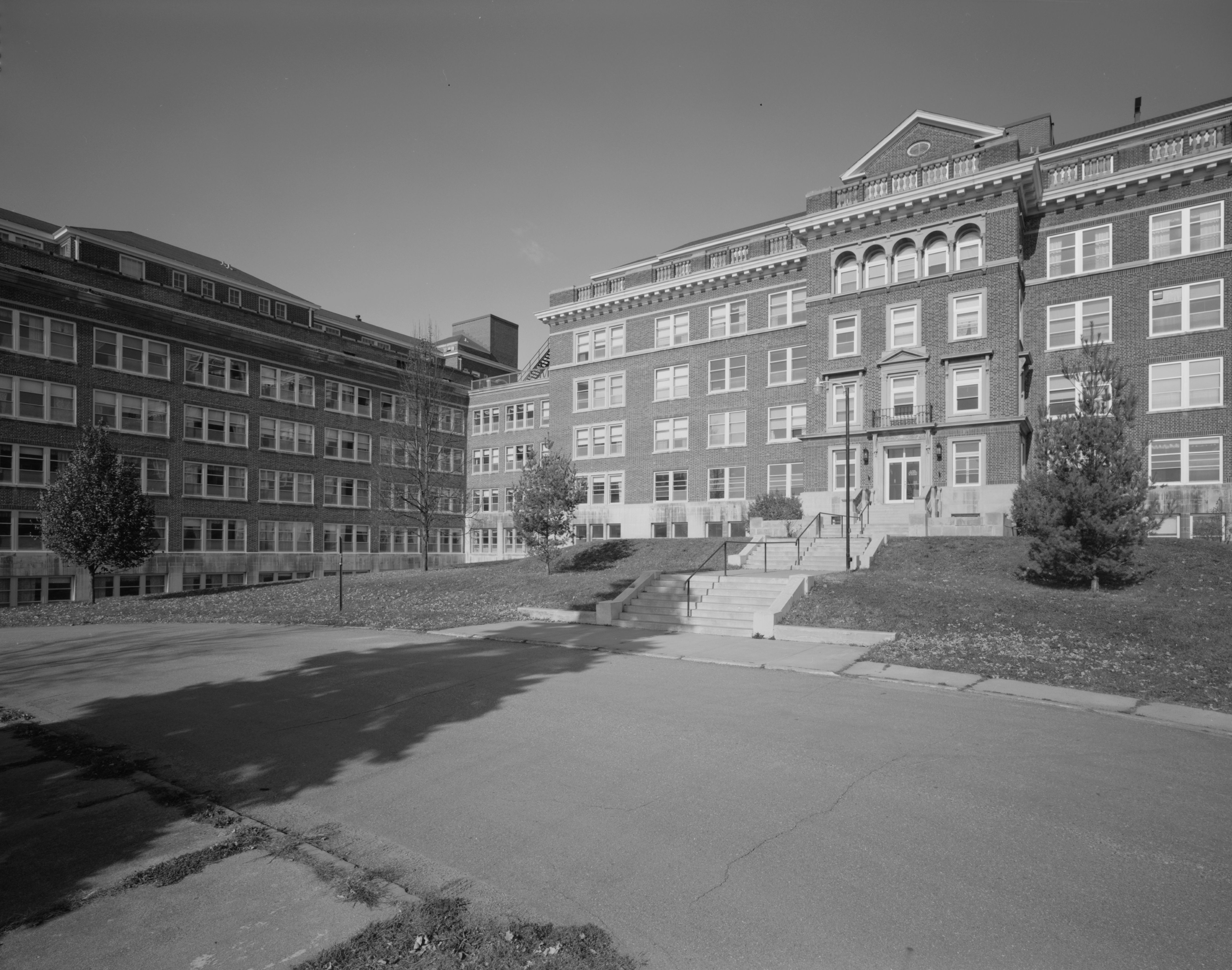
The former administration building of Glen Lake Sanatorium. This was originally opened in 1921 as the Infirmary Building.

Glen Lake Sanatorium, a tuberculosis treatment center serving Hennepin County in Minnesota, opened on January 4, 1916, with a capacity of 50 patients, and closed in 1976. In 1909, the Minnesota State Legislature had passed a bill authorizing the appointment of county sanatorium boards and appropriating money for the construction of county sanatoriums. Glen Lake Sanatorium was the fifth of fourteen county sanatoria that opened in Minnesota between 1912 and 1918. Glen Lake was the first U.S. tuberculosis sanatorium to be accredited by the American Medical Association.The sanatorium had its own post office, and the mailing address was Glen Lake Sanatorium, Oak Terrace, Minnesota, until the surrounding area was incorporated into the City of Minnetonka.

== Timeline ==
1916: The Glen Lake Sanatorium originally consisted of three stuccoed buildings: a cottage for patients (later known as the East Cottage), an administrative building, and a heating plant/laundry.

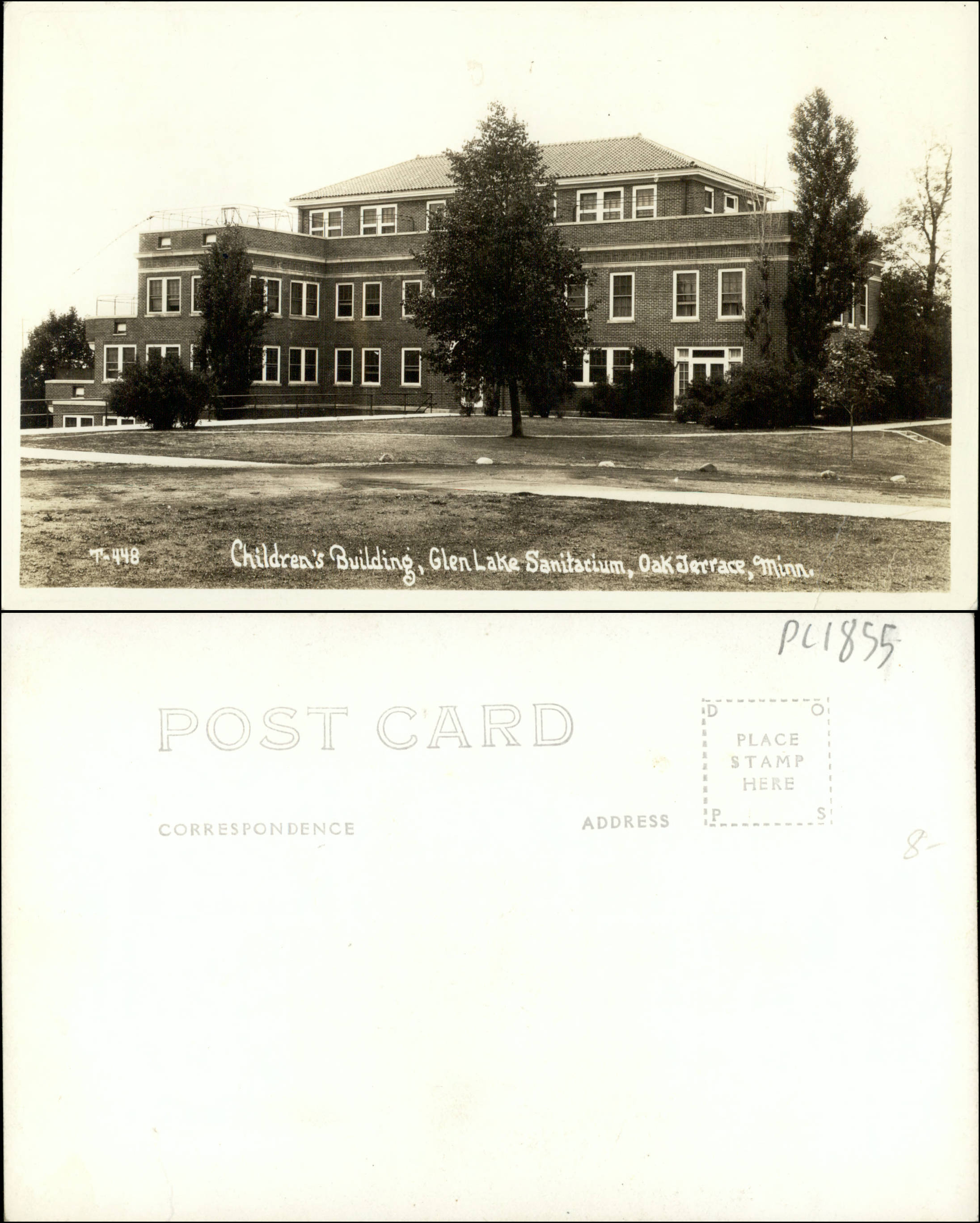
Children's Building at the Glen Lake Sanitarium

1917: A fourth building (known as West Cottage) doubled the capacity.

1921: An eight-floor brick administration building opened and the patient census increased to almost 300.

1922: A detached four-story Children's Building could house up to sixty children—many of whom had been exposed to tuberculosis in their home and had parents undergoing treatment in the main buildings. The building was financed by the Citizens' Aid Society in memory of Lenora Hall Christian.

1924: A building boom greatly expanded the sanatorium campus. An addition housing a bakery and new kitchen linked the 1916 and 1921 administration buildings. A seven-floor East Wing was added and the sanatorium could serve 490 patients. Two residence buildings were constructed. A nurses' residence built north of the main campus also housed other female staff. A power plant and a residence for male employees were built across the road from the campus to the south (present-day Eden Prairie).

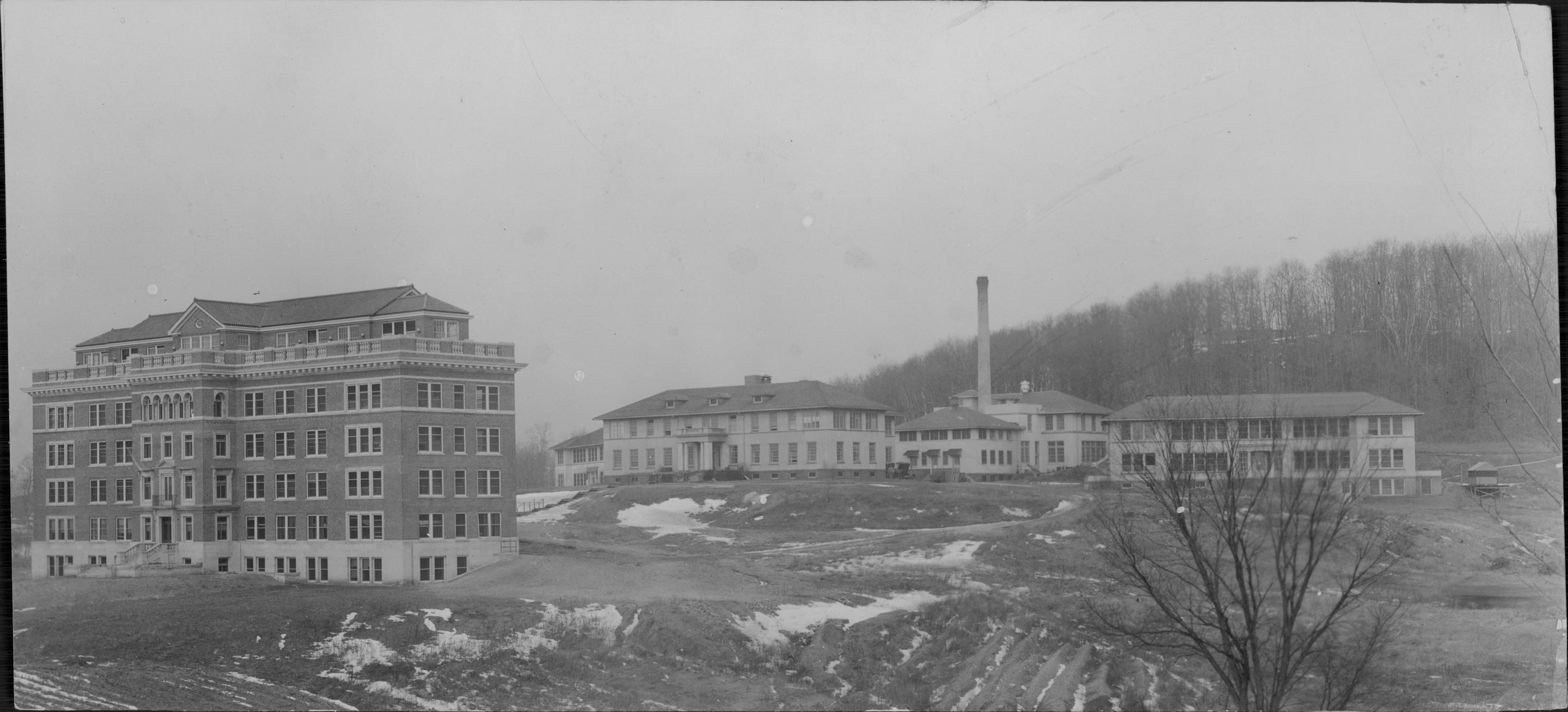
Glen Lake Sanatorium campus, 1921

1925: The West Wing opened. The capacity was increased to 600. The Christian family funded the Glen Lake Children's Camp on Birch Island Lake, a short distance south of the main sanatorium. It is now on the National Register of Historic Places.

1934: An addition to the East Wing added surgical suites, occupational and therapy rooms, and classrooms. This building was the second to be financed by the Citizens' Aid Society. Former offices in the other buildings were converted to patient rooms and the final capacity of Glen Lake Sanatorium was 680 patients.

1936: The peak of the tuberculosis epidemic in Hennepin County occurred. The Glen Lake Sanatorium's population exceeded 700, with patients in hallways on gurneys and porches enclosed and transformed into wards. In 1936, the average stay by a patient at Glen Lake was 538 days.

1961: Chemotherapy had all but eliminated the need for extended stays in a sanatorium. Hennepin County leased the Glen Lake Sanatorium campus to the State of Minnesota. The state's Department of Public Welfare converted the sanatorium to a psycho-geriatric nursing home to serve aging residents of its state hospital system. It was named Oak Terrace Nursing Home in reference to the original post office address of Glen Lake Sanatorium, which was Oak Terrace, MN. A portion of the main building continued to house tuberculosis patients and operated as the Minnesota State Sanatorium.

1976: The last tuberculosis patient was discharged and the facility became a state Nursing facility for Ward of the State patients; those with severe mental and or physical disabilities. As other state facilities closed, patients were moved to Glen Lake Sanatorium, Which was then called "Oak Terrace Nursing Home".

1990: The state closed the nursing home when the Department of Human Services (formerly DPW) moved to a decentralized system of care.

1993: The entire campus, excepting the children's camp which is located in Eden Prairie, was razed. The Glen Lake Golf and Practice Center operated by Three Rivers Park District now occupies the site.

== Treatment ==
The Glen Lake Sanatorium was constructed on the Trudeau Sanatorium model, established at the Adirondack Cottage Sanitarium in Saranac Lake, New York by Dr. Edward Livingston Trudeau. The fresh-air-and-bed-rest treatment of tuberculous patients often meant open windows, even during Minnesota winters. Sun therapy, called heliotherapy, was the other essential element of early treatment at Glen Lake. The 1921 Administration building and East and West Wings featured "deck houses" or uncovered porches running the entire length of the buildings' top floors. Patients would lie in beds entirely exposed to the sun's rays, wearing minimal clothing. Patients' rooms on other floors had floor-to-ceiling triple-hung windows that would slide up and allow beds to be wheeled onto small porches.

In 1922, Glen Lake Sanatorium doctors first adopted and performed a surgical procedure known as artificial pneumothorax, which collapsed the lung affected by pulmonary tuberculosis. Collapse inhibited the proliferation of tubercle bacilli and stimulated the formation of scar tissue that controlled the disease. Another method, called extrapleural thoracoplasty, involved removal of portions of several ribs to collapse the chest wall. Phrenic nerve interruption was introduced to Glen Lake in 1924. This paralysis of the diaphragm reduced movement of the affected lung.

The collapse era was followed by chemotherapy. Streptomycin, a World War II development, was readily available by 1949. Isoniazid came into use in 1952 and, together with streptomycin, shortened patient stays from years to months.

== Related books and movies ==
Minnesota author Frederick Manfred was a patient at Glen Lake Sanatorium from 1940 to 1942. While there he met his future wife and fellow patient, Maryanna Shorba. Manfred later fictionalized his stay in the book Boy Almighty, published under his given name of Feike Feikema.

Dr. Harry Wilmer, coincidentally a roommate of Frederick Manfred at Glen Lake Sanatorium, wrote Huber the Tuber which was published by the National Tuberculosis Association in 1942. It was used in educational campaigns against tuberculosis.

The opening black and white sequence of Untamed Heart was filmed at Glen Lake Sanatorium shortly before it was demolished. In the movie, it represented the Catholic orphanage in which Christian Slater's character grew up. The bedside scene was filmed in the Children's Building and the other scene took place in the main first-floor hallway of the Administration Building. At the time of filming, the working title was "Baboon Heart."

The video documentary From Beginning to End: Glen Lake Sanatorium and Oak Terrace Nursing Home was produced in 1990 as a tribute to the 75th anniversary of the opening of the Sanatorium. The video, produced at Paragon Cable Studios by Steve Perkins, Mary Krugerud, and Colleen Spadaccini, is available for viewing at the Hennepin [County] History Museum.

"A Girl at a Tuberculosis Sanatorium" recounts the story of Theresa Ledermann, who was 13 years old when she entered Glen Lake Sanatorium for what turned out to be a four-year stay.

San Memories, a collection of photographs and oral histories, was published in celebration of the 75th anniversary of the opening of Glen Lake Sanatorium.

"The Christian Family's Fight Against Tuberculosis" details the many efforts of George Christian and his family to use their personal wealth to improve the care and treatment of people with TB.

"She's Consumed by the Story of the State's Sanatoriums" is about one person's interest in Minnesota's system of county tuberculosis sanatoriums.

Glen Lake Sanatorium is one of several tuberculosis facilities in Minnesota that is featured in the website Minnesota's Tuberculosis Sanatoriums.

"Interrupted Lives: The History of Tuberculosis in Minnesota and Glen Lake Sanatorium," written by Mary Krugerud, was published by North Star Press, St. Cloud MN, in September 2017. It relies on diaries, letters, and many interviews with former patients and employees to look beyond the common stereotypes of enforced confinement to present daily life in a sanatorium and changes in treatment over several decades.
