= William C. Wallace =

American politician

William Copeland Wallace
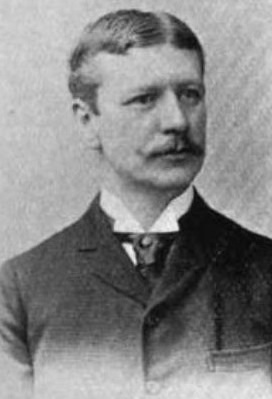

Member of the U.S. House of Representatives from New York's 3rd district
- In office March 4, 1889 – March 3, 1891
- Preceded by: Stephen V. White
- Succeeded by: William J. Coombs

Personal details
- Born: May 21, 1856 Brooklyn, New York, U.S.
- Died: September 4, 1901 (aged 45) Warwick, New York, U.S.

William Copeland Wallace (May 21, 1856 – September 4, 1901) was a U.S. representative from New York.

Born in Brooklyn, New York, Wallace graduated from Adelphi Academy, Brooklyn, New York, in 1873, from Wesleyan University, Middletown, Connecticut, in 1876, and from the law department of Columbia College (now Columbia University), New York City, in 1878. He commenced the practice of law in New York City. He served as assistant United States Attorney for the United States District Court for the Southern District of New York in 1880–1883. He was appointed judge advocate general on the staff of Governor Morton in 1894.

Wallace was elected as a Republican to the Fifty-first Congress (March 4, 1889 – March 3, 1891). He was an unsuccessful candidate for reelection in 1890 to the Fifty-second Congress. He resumed the practice of his profession in Brooklyn, New York. He also engaged extensively in banking. He died at his summer home in Warwick, New York, September 4, 1901. He was interred in Greenwood Cemetery, Brooklyn, New York.

U.S. House of Representatives
Preceded by Stephen V. White	Member of the U.S. House of Representatives from New York's 3rd congressional district 1889–1891	Succeeded by William J. Coombs
