= Camp Harding, Colorado =

Camp Harding was a summer resort with boarding house west of Broadmoor Park "at the mouth of Cheyenne canon" that was one of several early 20th century health facilities in the area (cf., the 17 consumption "sanatoriums in the Pikes Peak region", e.g., the largest at The Modern Woodmen of America Sanatorium in "Monument Park (later Woodmen Valley)".) Anna E Harding was the 1903 proprietor (there was also a coachmen and domestic) of the facility on W Cheyenne Road, which was through the gate with gatekeeper for the "carriage-way to the Cheyenne canons" with a "rustic bridge" to Camp Harding's "red roof" structures and pine trees. Camp Harding had a single-story cottage, c. seven tents, and a 2-story brick home with striped porch awning, and the camp was named in a 1912 Long Island, New York, divorce case. The area is now part of the Colorado Springs metropolitan area.
