= Hamilton Primary School =

- U.S. National Register of Historic Places
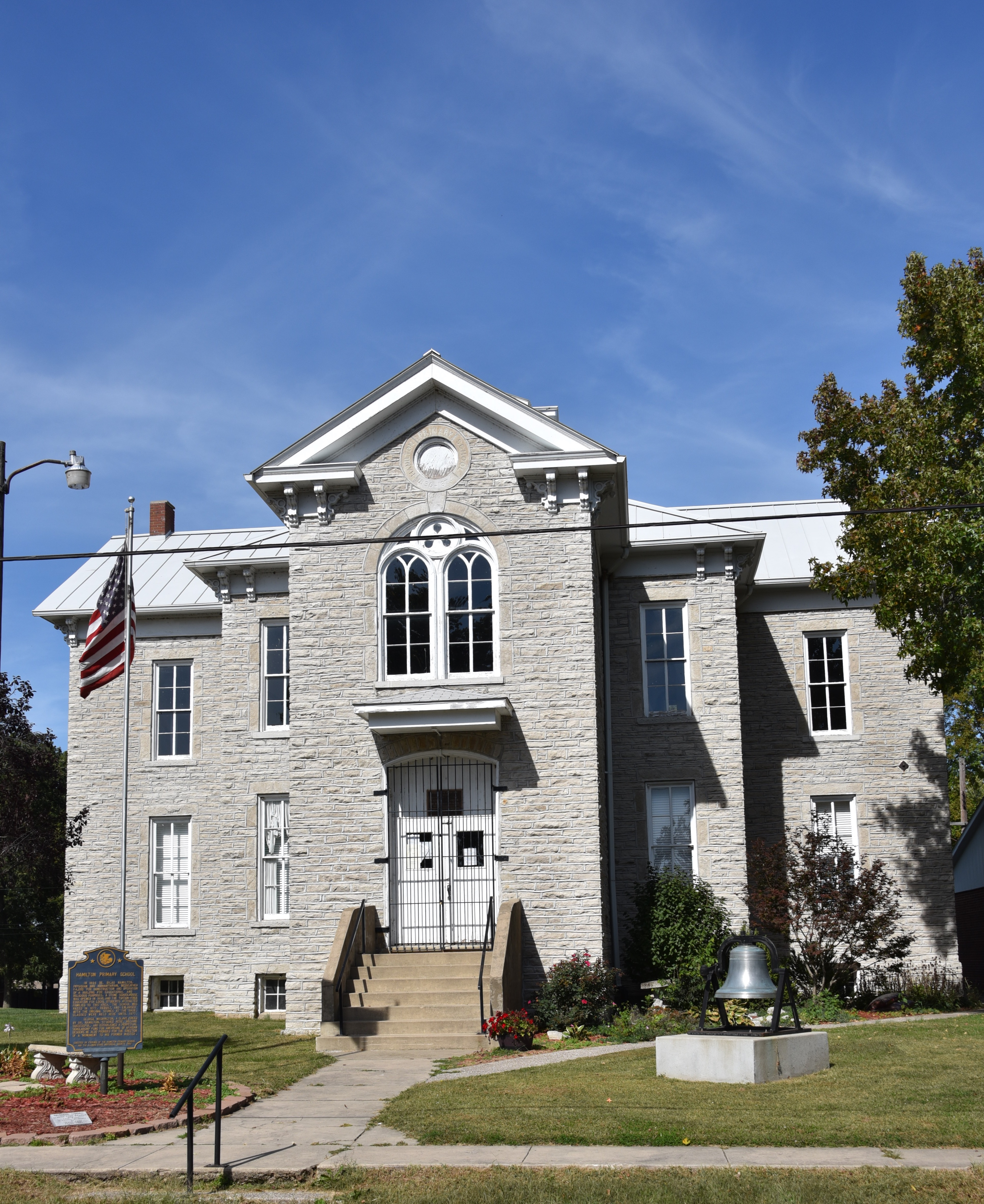

- Location within Illinois Location within the United States
- Location: 107 E. Main Street, Otterville, Illinois
- Coordinates: 39°3′4″N 90°23′50″W
- Area: 0.5 acres (0.20 ha)
- Built: 1873
- Architectural style: Italianate
- NRHP reference No.: 98000975
- Added to NRHP: August 6, 1998

The Hamilton Primary School is a historic school building located 200 feet (61 m) on 107 E. Main Street in Otterville, Illinois. The two-story Italianate building was constructed in 1873 using limestone from the original school building, which was built in 1835. The original school was the first free and integrated school in the United States. The building was added to the National Register of Historic Places on August 6, 1998.

== History ==
Dr. Silas Hamilton, for whom the school is named, was born in New England. He later owned and operated a plantation in Mississippi, hoping to influence his neighbors by treating his slave humanely. His neighbors were unimpressed, and after the death of his son, Silas abandoned his dream. In 1827, he freed his 28 slaves in Cincinnati. He then moved to Illinois, settling in Otterville (then known as Gullum) in 1830. When Hamilton died in 1834, he left $4000 for the construction of a free and integrated public school. The school, which was completed in 1835, was the first free school in Illinois and the first free and integrated school in the United States. In 1839, the Illinois General Assembly legally incorporated the school. The original building was demolished in 1872, and the current school building was built from the same stone the following year.

George Washington, one of Hamilton's former slaves, bequeathed $1500 upon his death in 1864 to build a monument to Hamilton. The marble monument, erected in front of the school the same year, is currently maintained by the Illinois Department of Natural Resources. A plaque in front of the Jersey County Courthouse also commemorates the school.

The school building served Otterville's students until 1971. The Otter Creek Historical Society took control of the building in 1982; however, the school has suffered from poor maintenance since then due to insufficient funding. Landmarks Illinois named the school as one of the ten most endangered historic places in Illinois in April 2014.

== Architecture ==
The two-story, limestone school has an Italianate design. The limestone used to build the school came from the 1835 school building and was originally from the Hiram White Quarry in Mississippi Township; due to its local abundance, limestone was a popular building material in Jersey County in the mid-19th century. The front entrance has an arched double door below a second-floor arched section with two arched windows and an oculus; another oculus is above the opening, and a pediment tops the entrance bay. The other first- and second-story windows are tall and narrow with arched hoods. The school's roof has wide eaves with decorative brackets and is topped by a cupola.
