= Lima Tuberculosis Hospital =

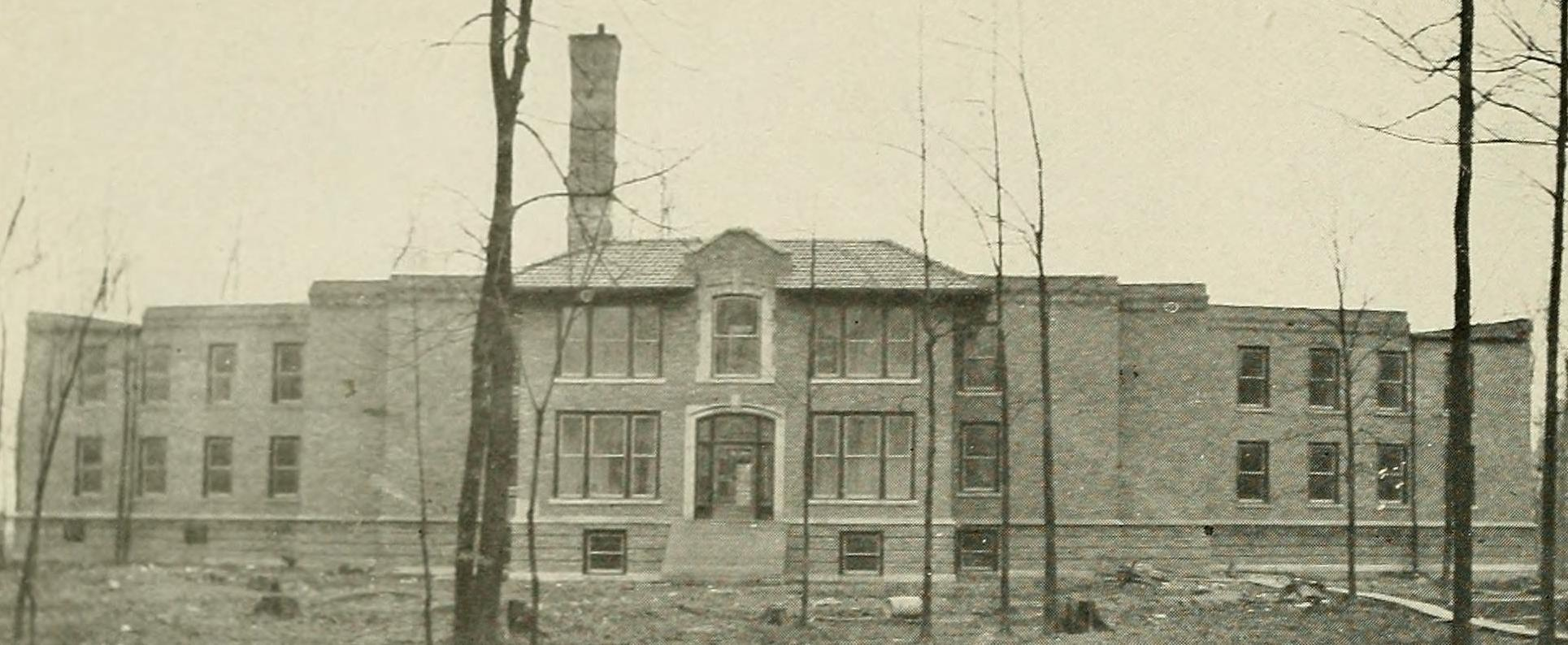
- Photo from 1911 book

Geography
- Location: Lima, Ohio, United States
- Coordinates: 40°43′20″N 84°8′34″W

Organization
- Care system: Government

Services
- Beds: 25 (original) 158 (final)

History
- Founded: April 5, 1911
- Closed: 1973

Links
- Lists: Hospitals in Ohio

The Lima Tuberculosis Hospital was a tuberculosis sanatorium built in 1911 to deal with the leading causes of death in the United States in the early twentieth century.

== History ==
=== Establishment ===
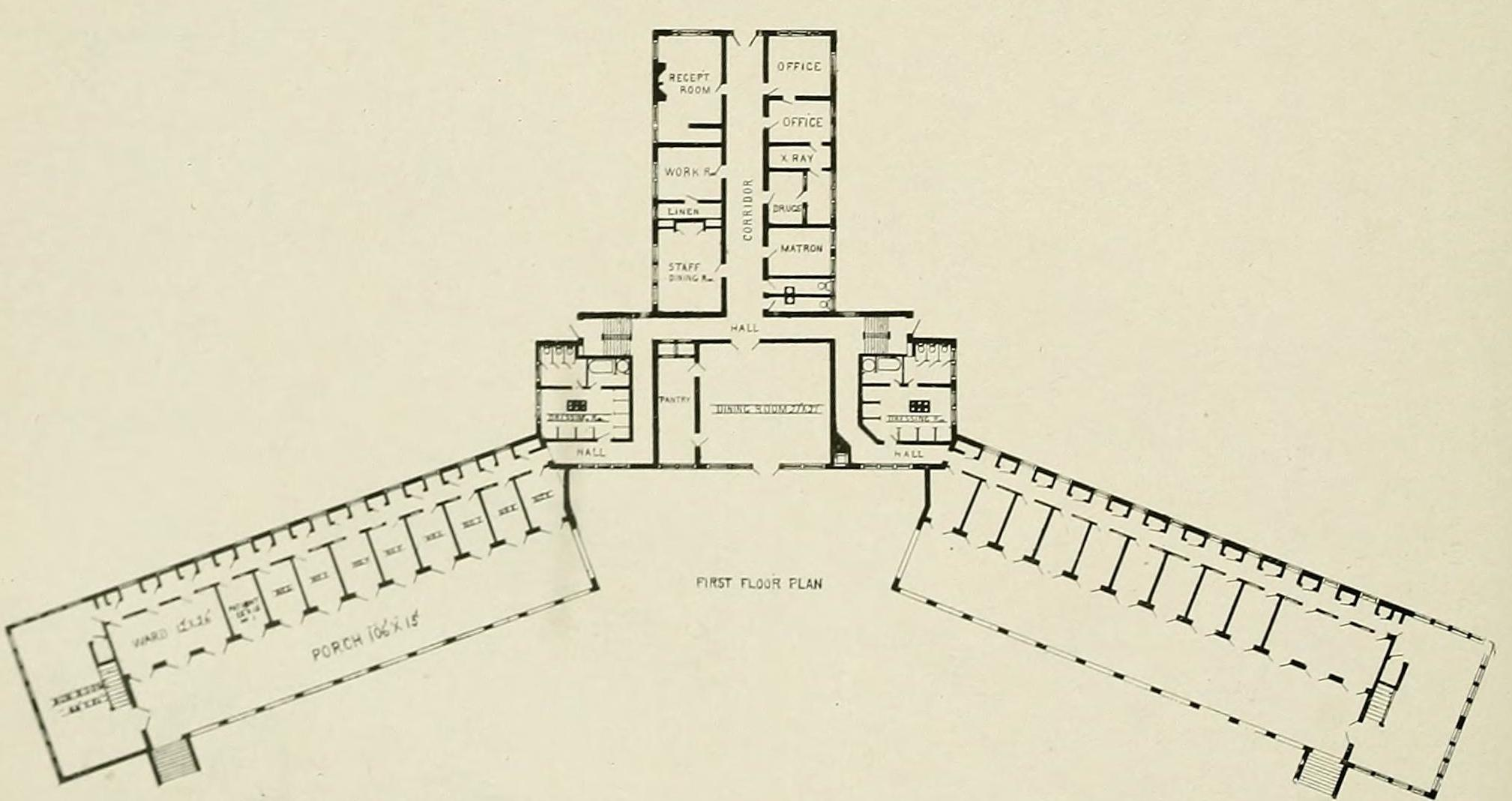
The original floor plan in 1911.

From establishment in 1911 it held 24 beds originally, and was remodeled in 1927 to hold 158 beds.

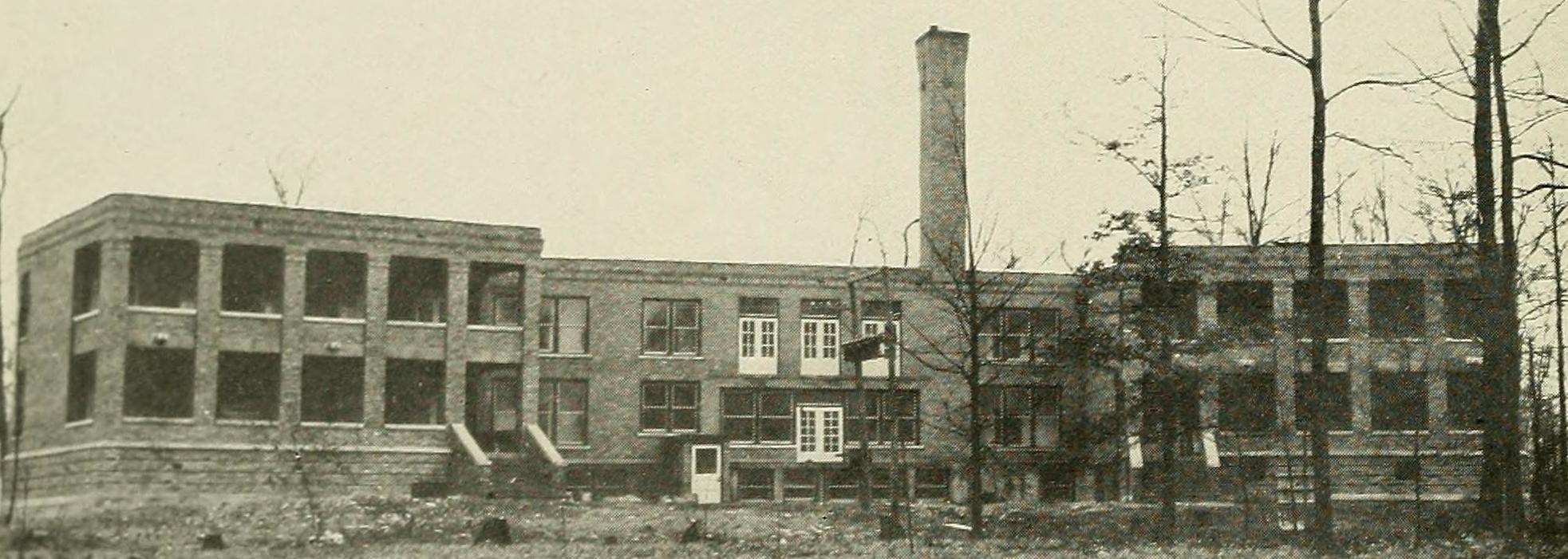
The rear of the hospital in 1911.

The capacity changed to 138 patients after an additional remodel occurred in 1957.

The hospital was renamed Ottawa Valley Tuberculosis Hospital in 1960. By 1970 it was nearly empty. In 1972 use of the second floor was shuttered and the entire hospital closed in 1973.

=== Abandonment ===
While the hospital was winding down operation, on January 10, 1972, it was agreed that the hospital would be transferred to the Allen County Board of Commissioners.

Because of its relatively remote location and the use of hard to clean up substances such as asbestos in the construction of the original 1911 building, the city of Lima did not prioritize demolition of the building.

Around Halloween of 2020 a large surge of trespassing at the site occurred, which lead to an increased police presence and crackdown on trespassers.

In November of 2024 it was announced by the city of Lima that the site would be demolished.

In 2025 Allen County Land Bank entered into a contract for asbestos abatement.
