= Boston Sanatorium =

Historical hospital in Massachusetts

- Boston Consumptives Department
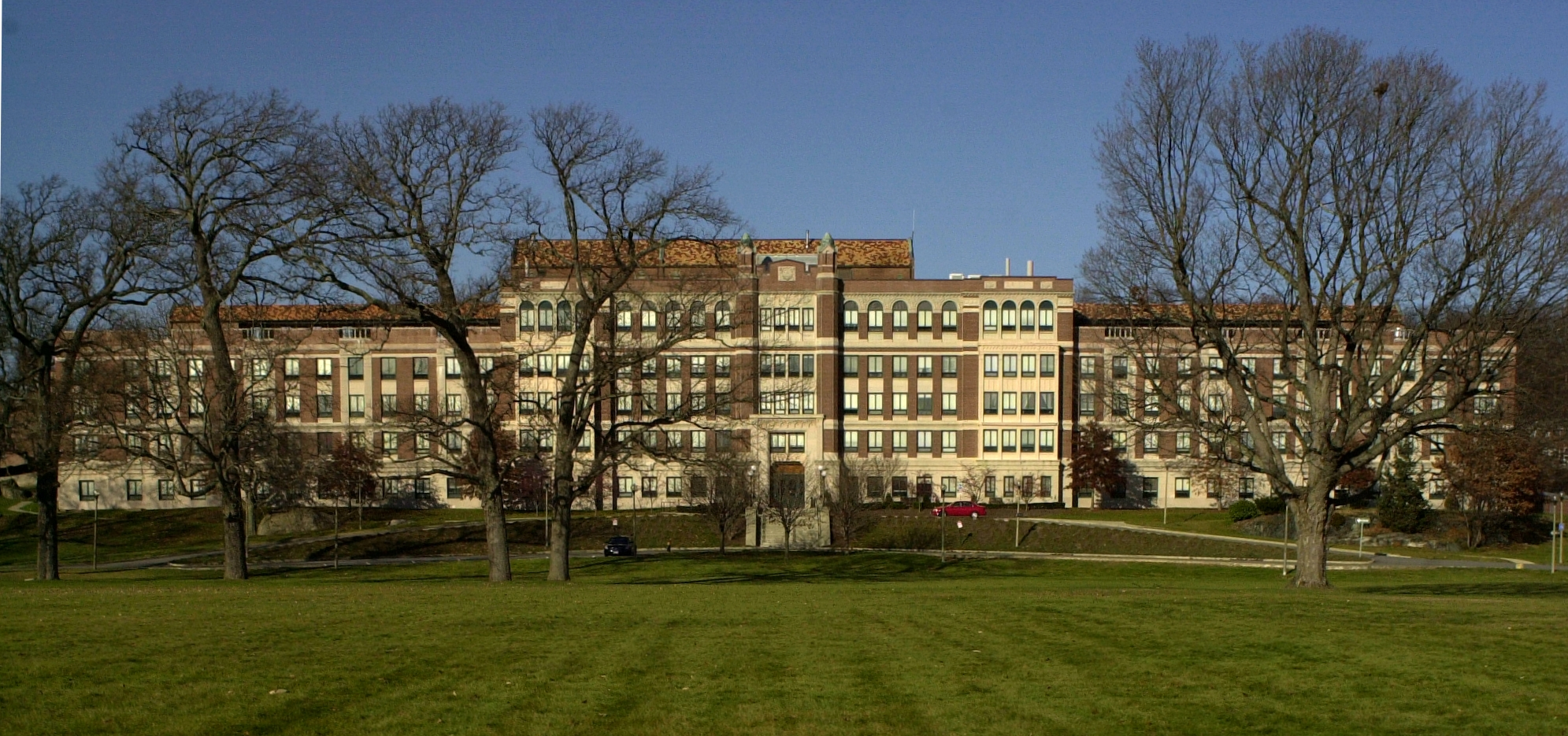

Geography
- Location: Mattapan, Boston, Massachusetts, United States
- Coordinates: 42°16′22″N 71°4′54″W

Organization
- Type: Specialist

Services
- Speciality: Tuberculosis

History
- Former name: Boston Consumptives Hospital
- Constructed: 1908
- Closed: Mid-1900s

Links
- Lists: Hospitals in Massachusetts
- Boston Consumptives Hospital
- U.S. National Register of Historic Places
- U.S. Historic district
- Location within Massachusetts Location within the United States
- Location: 249 River St., Boston, Massachusetts
- Area: 52 acres (21 ha)
- Architect: Maginnis & Walsh; James Ritchie
- NRHP reference No.: 01001557
- Added to NRHP: February 7, 2002

The Boston Sanatorium (originally named the Boston Consumptives Hospital) is a historic tuberculosis hospital in the Mattapan neighborhood of Boston, Massachusetts. It consists of a complex of eighteen historic buildings on 52 acres (21 ha) of land. Most of these buildings were built between 1908 and 1932, although the Superintendent's House predates the hospital's construction; it is an Italianate house built c. 1856. They are predominantly brick buildings that are Colonial Revival in character, although the 1929 main administration building has a variety of different revival elements. Several of the buildings on the campus—The Administrative or Foley Building; The Doctor's Residences, Dormitories and Wards; and The Power House—were designed by the renowned architectural firm Maginnis and Walsh. The complex was the largest tuberculosis hospital in the state, built in response to reports that the disease was responsible for more deaths than any other in the city. The facility was used for the treatment of tuberculosis through the middle of the 20th century, and then stood largely vacant until 2002, when plans were laid to rehabilitate the property for other uses.

The hospital site was listed on the National Register of Historic Places in 2002.

== See also ==
- National Register of Historic Places listings in southern Boston, Massachusetts
