= William J. Coombs =

American politician

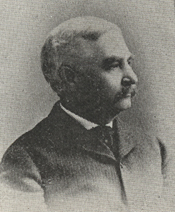

Member of the U.S. House of Representatives from New York
- In office March 4, 1891 – March 3, 1895
- Preceded by: William C. Wallace
- Succeeded by: Israel F. Fischer
- Constituency: 3rd district (1891–93); 4th district (1893–95)

Personal details
- Born: December 24, 1833 Jordan, New York, U.S.
- Died: January 12, 1922 (aged 88) Brooklyn, New York, U.S.
- Party: Democratic

William Jerome Coombs (December 24, 1833 – January 12, 1922) was a Bourbon Democrat member of the United States House of Representatives from New York, serving two terms from 1891 to 1895.

== Biography ==
Born in Jordan, New York, Coombs attended the Jordan Academy there. He moved to New York City in 1850, and in 1855 to Brooklyn. In 1856, he started a business exporting American products, which he did for the next 37 years.

=== Congress ===
He ran for Congress in 1888 but lost. Coombs ran again in 1890 and was elected as a Democrat to the 52nd United States Congress. He ran for re-election in 1892 and won a seat in the 53rd United States Congress. He was an unsuccessful candidate for reelection in 1894.

President Grover Cleveland appointed Coombs a director of the Union Pacific Railroad in 1894, with a special commission to collect the debts due the United States Government from the various Pacific railroads.

=== Later career and death ===
Coombs later served as president of the Manufacturers' Terminal Co., and after that headed the Title Guarantee & Trust Co. of Brooklyn.

In 1904, Coombs became president of the South Brooklyn Savings Institution, in which capacity he served until his death on January 12, 1922, aged 88. He was interred in Green-Wood Cemetery.

=== Family ===
His son Charles Adams Coombs married novelist Anne Sheldon Coombs.

U.S. House of Representatives
| Preceded by William C. Wallace | Member of the U.S. House of Representatives from New York's 3rd congressional district 1891–1893 | Succeeded by Joseph C. Hendrix |
| Preceded by John M. Clancy | Member of the U.S. House of Representatives from New York's 4th congressional district 1893–1895 | Succeeded by Israel F. Fischer |
