= Sanatorium =

Medical facility for treatment of chronic illness

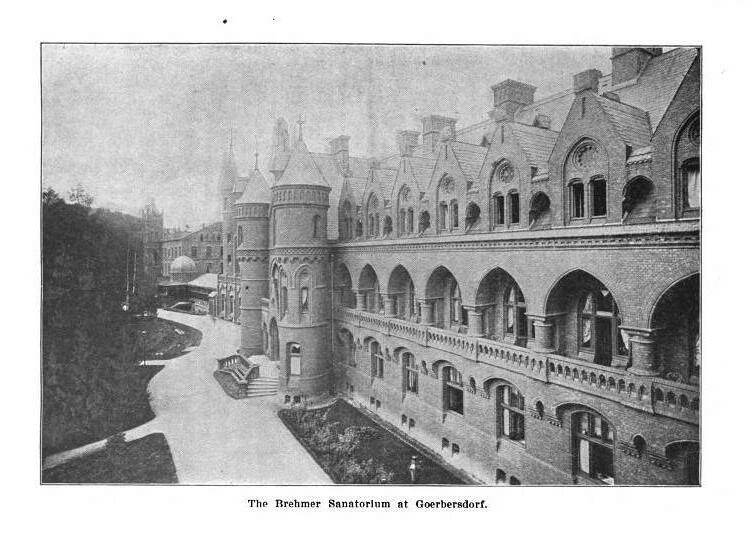
Becca sanatorium, photo before 1905, founded by Austrian physician Hermann Brehmer in Görbersdorf, Silesia (now Sokołowsko, Poland). Brehmer established the first German sanatorium for the systematic open-air treatment of tuberculosis; it was the first institution of its kind.

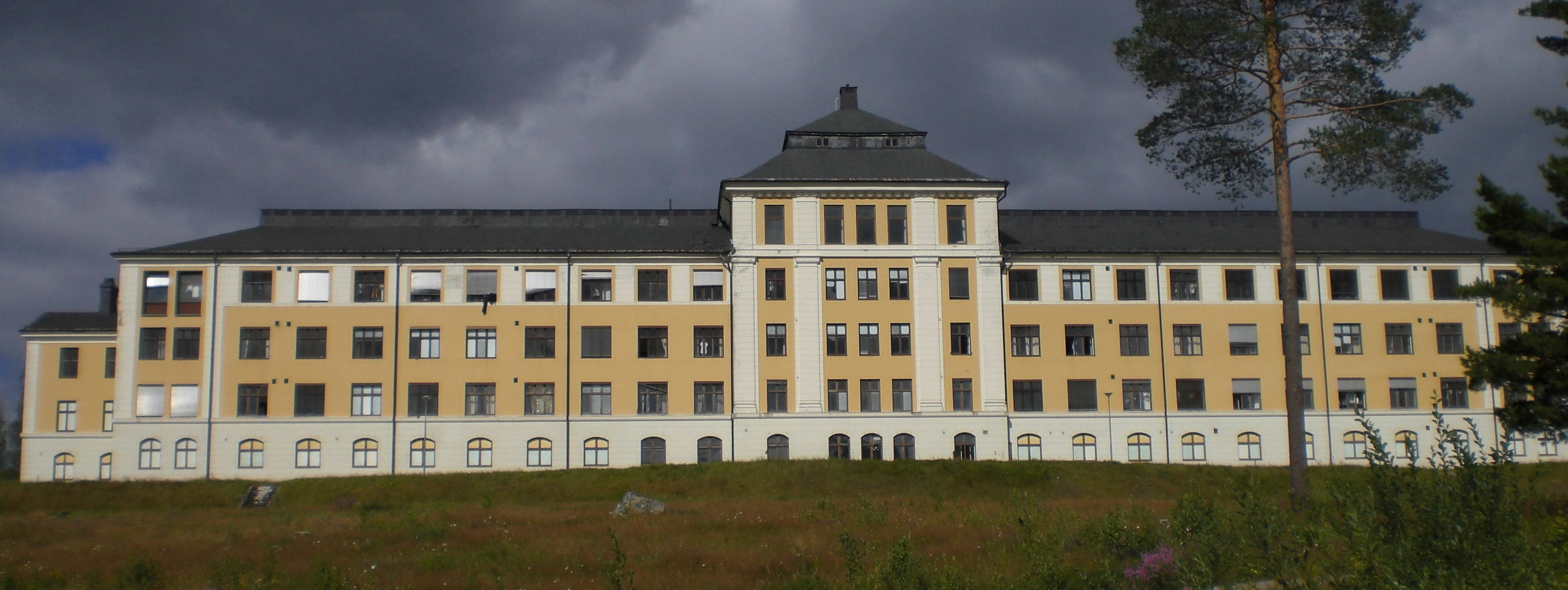
Hällnäs sanatorium, founded in 1926, was one of the largest sanatoria in Sweden for the treatment of pulmonary tuberculosis.

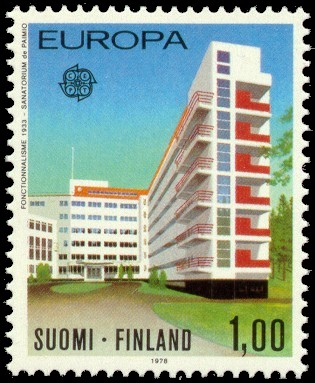
A 1978 Finnish postage stamp, depicting the 1933 Paimio tuberculosis sanatorium, designed by Alvar Aalto

A sanatorium (from Latin sanare 'to heal'), also sanitarium or sanitorium, is a historic name for a specialised hospital for the treatment of specific diseases, related ailments, and convalescence.

Sanatoria were often in a healthy climate, usually in the countryside. The idea of healing was an important reason for the historical wave of establishments of sanatoria, especially at the end of the 19th and early 20th centuries. The most common issue treated at sanatoria was tuberculosis (before the discovery of antibiotics). Some sanatoria also treated alcoholism as well as hysteria, masturbation, fatigue and emotional exhaustion. Facility operators were often charitable associations, such as the Order of St. John and the newly founded social welfare insurance companies.

Sanatoria should not be confused with the Russian sanatoria from the time of the Soviet Union, which were a type of sanatorium resort residence for workers.

== History ==
=== Conception ===
The first suggestion of sanatoria in the modern sense was likely made by George Bodington, who opened a sanatorium in Sutton Coldfield in 1836 and later published his essay "On the Treatment and Cure of Pulmonary Consumption" in 1840. His novel approach was dismissed as "very crude ideas and unsupported assertions" by reviewers in the Lancet, and his sanatorium was converted to an asylum soon after. The rationale for sanatoria in the pre-antibiotic era was that a regimen of rest and good nutrition offered the best chance that the patient's immune system would "wall off" pockets of pulmonary TB infection. In 1863, Hermann Brehmer opened the Brehmersche Heilanstalt für Lungenkranke in Görbersdorf (Sokołowsko), Silesia (now Poland), for the treatment of tuberculosis. Patients were exposed to plentiful amounts of high altitude, fresh air, and good nutrition. Tuberculosis sanatoria became common throughout Europe from the late-19th century onward.

=== Early establishments ===
The Adirondack Cottage Sanitarium, established in Saranac Lake, New York, in 1885, was the first such establishment in North America. According to the Saskatchewan Lung Association, when the National Anti-Tuberculosis Association (Canada) was founded in 1904, its members, including renowned pioneer in the fight against tuberculosis R.G. Ferguson, believed that a distinction should be made between the health resorts with which people were familiar and the new tuberculosis treatment hospitals: "So they decided to use a new word which instead of being derived from the Latin noun sanitas, meaning health, would emphasize the need for scientific healing or treatment. Accordingly, they took the Latin verb root sano, meaning to heal, and adopted the new word sanatorium."

Switzerland used to have many sanatoria, as health professionals believed that clean, cold mountain air was the best treatment for lung diseases. In Finland, a series of tuberculosis sanatoria were built throughout the country in isolated forest areas during the early 1900s. The most famous was the Paimio Sanatorium, completed in 1933 and designed by world-renowned architect Alvar Aalto. It had both sun-balconies and a rooftop terrace where the patients would lie all day either in beds or on specially designed chairs, the Paimio Chair. In Portugal, the Heliantia Sanatorium in Valadares was used for the treatment of bone tuberculosis between the 1930s and 1960s.

=== In 20th-century United States ===
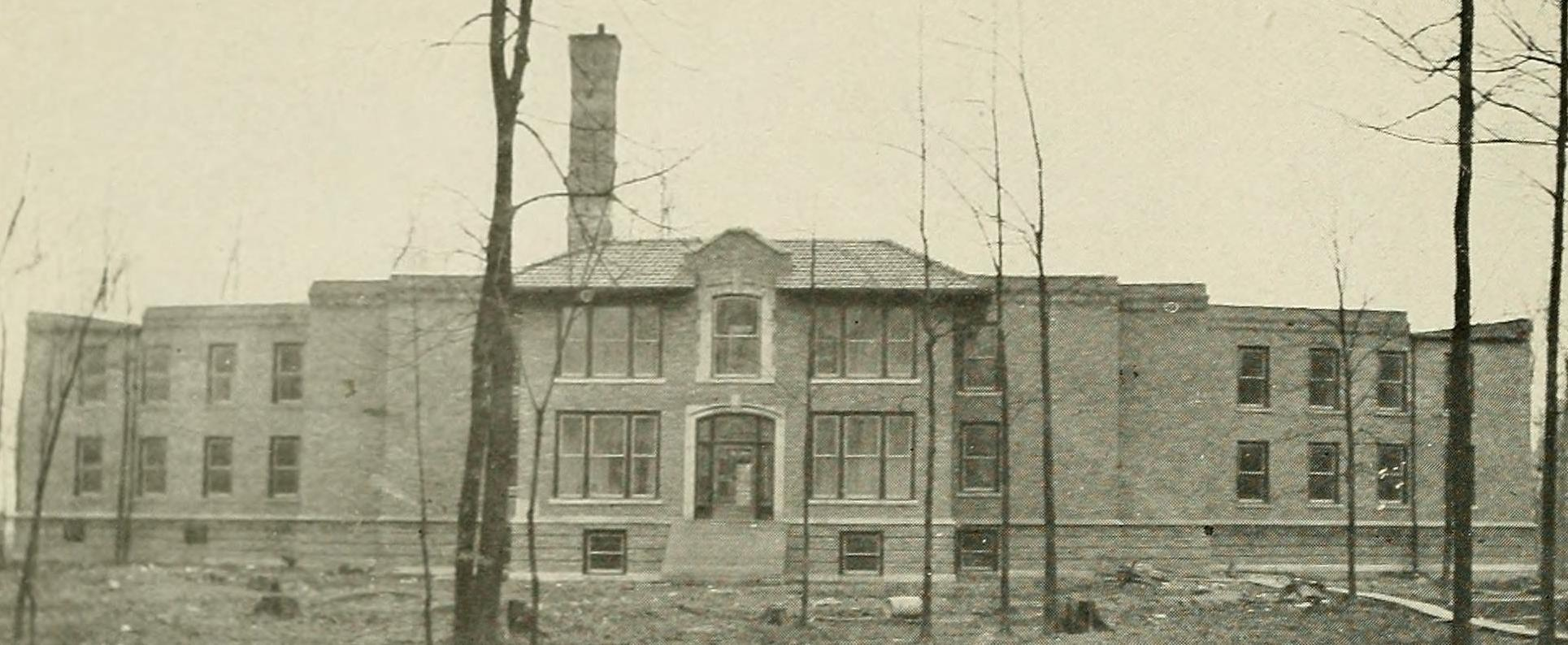
The Lima Tuberculosis Hospital in 1911

In the early 20th century, tuberculosis sanatoria became common in the United States. The first of several in Asheville, North Carolina was established by Horatio Page Gatchell in 1871, before the cause of tuberculosis (then called "phthisis" or "consumption") was even known. Dr. Karl Von Ruck's "Winyah Sanitorium" was a "for-profit, state-of-the-art hospital like many private hospitals of today" with 100 beds. Fifty years earlier, J.F.E. Hardy had reportedly been cured in the "healing climate". Medical experts reported that at 2,200 feet (670 m) above sea level, air pressure was equal to that in blood vessels, and activities, scenery, and lack of stress also helped. In the early 1900s, Arizona's sunshine and dry desert air attracted many people (called "lungers") who had tuberculosis, rheumatism, asthma, and numerous other diseases. Wealthier people chose to recuperate in exclusive TB resorts, while others used their savings to journey to Arizona and arrived penniless. TB camps in the desert were formed by pitching tents and building cabins. During the tuberculosis epidemic, cities in Arizona advertised the state as an ideal place for treating TB. Many sanatoria in Arizona were modeled after European away-from-city resorts of the time, boasting courtyards and individual rooms. Each sanatorium was equipped to take care of about 120 people.

The first sanatorium in the Pacific Northwest opened in Milwaukie Heights, Oregon, in 1905, followed closely by the first state-owned TB hospital in Salem, Oregon, in 1910. Oregon was the first state on the West Coast to enact legislation stating that the government was to supply proper housing for people with TB who could not receive adequate care at home. The West Coast became a popular spot for sanatoria.

The greatest area for sanatoria was in Tucson with over twelve hotel-style facilities in the city. By 1920, Tucson had 7,000 people who had come for treatment of tuberculosis. So many people came to the West that not enough housing was available. In 1910, tent cities began to pop up in different areas; one was described as a place of squalor and shunned by most citizens. Many of the infected slept in the open desert. The area adjacent to what was then central Phoenix, called Sunnyslope, was home to another large TB encampment. The residents primarily lived in tents pitched along the hillsides of the mountains that rise to the north of the city. Several sanatoria also opened in southern California in the early 20th century due to the dry, warm climate.

The first tuberculosis sanatorium for Black Americans in the segregated South was the Piedmont Sanatorium in Burkeville, Virginia. Waverly Hills Sanatorium, a Louisville, Kentucky, tuberculosis sanatorium, was founded in 1911. It has become a mecca for curiosity seekers who believe it is haunted. Because of its dry climate, Colorado Springs was home to several sanatoria. A. G. Holley Hospital in Lantana, Florida, was the last remaining freestanding tuberculosis sanatorium in the United States until it closed on July 2, 2012.

The largest U.S. tuberculosis sanatorium was located on the site of Chicago's present-day North Park Village. Chicago's Peterson Park fieldhouse housed the lab and morgue of Chicago's Municipal Tuberculosis Sanatorium.

=== Discovery of antibiotics and decline ===
After 1943, when Albert Schatz, then a graduate student at Rutgers University, discovered streptomycin, an antibiotic and the first cure for tuberculosis, sanatoria began to close. As in the case of the Paimio Sanatorium, many were transformed into general hospitals. By the 1950s, tuberculosis was no longer a major public health threat in the developed world; it was controlled by antibiotics rather than extended rest. Most sanatoria had been demolished years before.

Some, however, have been adapted for new medical roles. The Tambaram Sanatorium in south India is now a hospital for AIDS patients. The state hospital in Sanatorium, Mississippi, is now a regional center for programs for treatment and occupational therapy associated with intellectual disability. In Japan in 2001, the Ministry of Welfare suggested changing the name of a leprosarium to a sanatorium.

=== Post-Soviet states ===
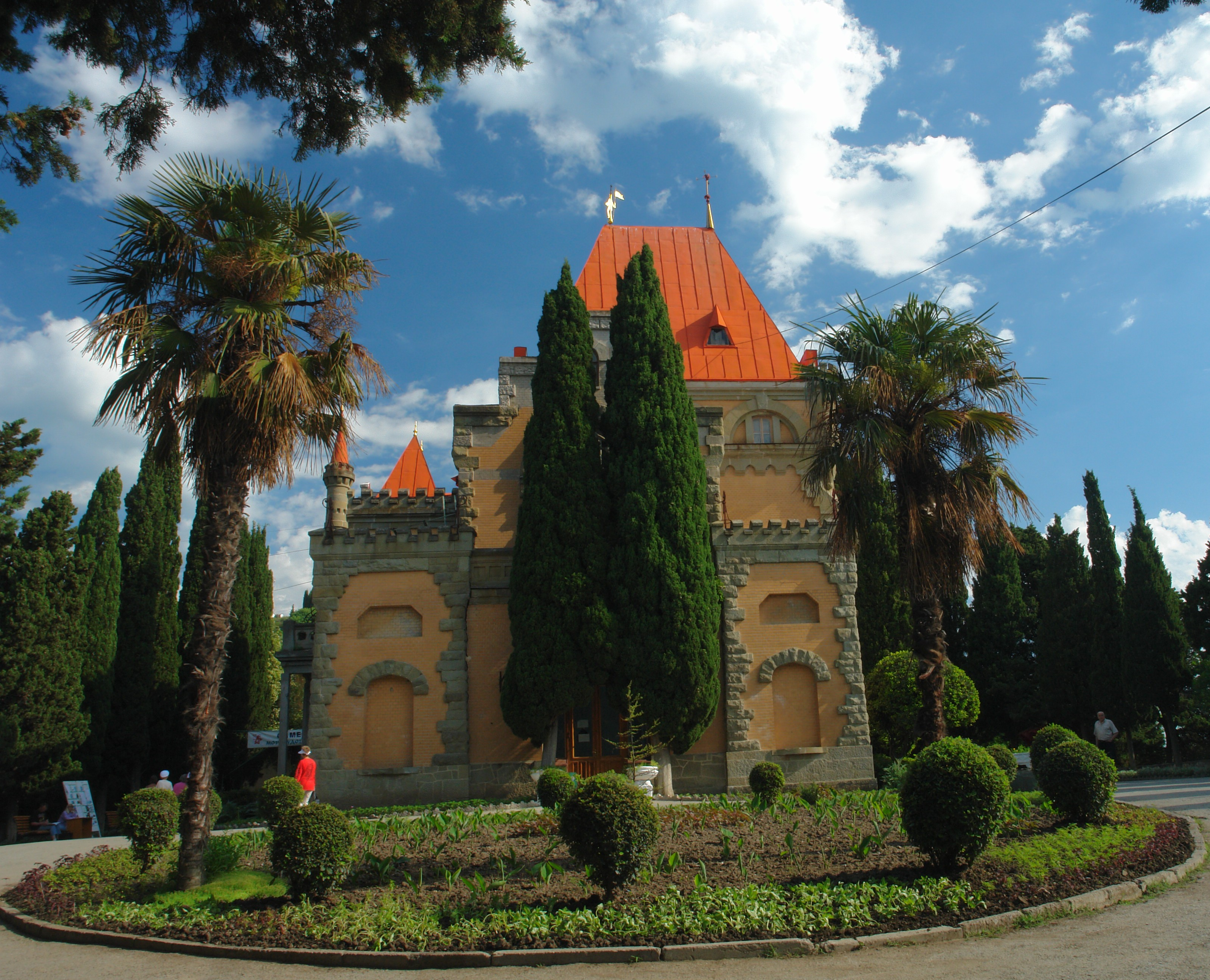
Palace of Princess Anastasia Gagarina — now the administrative centre of the sanatorium "Utyos" along the coast of Crimea, Ukraine, 2005

In the post-Soviet countries, sanatorium is generally used to refer to a combination resort/recreational facility and a medical facility to provide short-term complex rest and medical services. It is similar to a spa resort, but with medical services.

In countries of the former Warsaw Pact, sanatoria are hotels with health resort facilities and services such as massage, pools, saunas, aromatherapy, and oxygen therapy not covered by medical insurance; they are spa resorts catering to healthy people seeking a restful respite from their jobs. For example, Sanatorium Astória and others located in Karlovy Vary, Czech Republic, or the Geneva Sanatorium Hotel, Ukraine, serve this purpose. A doctor's prescription is usually not required. However, a general practitioner is available for guests to have a medical check-up at the beginning and end of their stay.

Sanatoria first began to achieve prominence in the Soviet Union in the early 1920s, with the introduction of the Labour Code of the Russian SFSR, which established basic recommendations and standards for Russian workers (distinct labour codes of the Union Republics would later be standardized in 1970). This Labour Code guaranteed at least two weeks of annual leave for all workers, recommending that it be spent at a sanatorium for health reasons. A medical professional would recommend a place and duration of stay, typically ranging from 24 days to 10 months, and the worker would file a form (putyevka) for the recommended stay. The cost was partly or completely covered by unions or health insurance. By 1990, sanatoria in the Soviet Union could hold up to 50,000 guests at once. After the dissolution of the Soviet Union, many sanatoria fell into disrepair and some became refugee camps, but a number of sanatoria across the former Union Republics are still in operation. Issyk-Kul in Kyrgyzstan was known for such sanatoria, some of which have been refurbished.

== In culture ==
Fictional stories that are set in sanatoria often make use of the isolated locations of these health care facilities, high in a mountainous region. The emotions evoked by the sanatorium setting may be positive if the facility is beautiful and well-run, or dark and scary if the facilities are run-down or, in a horror story, abandoned.

- The mystery writer Mary Roberts Rinehart's Where There's a Will (1912) was set in a sanatorium.
- The Magic Mountain, the 1924 novel by German writer and social critic Thomas Mann, is set in a sanatorium.
- The 1976 The Scooby-Doo Show episode "The Harum Scarum Sanitarium" takes place at a sanitarium in Niagara Falls.
- The American thrash metal band Metallica has the song "Welcome Home (Sanitarium)" on their 1986 Master of Puppets studio album, which had been in part inspired by One Flew Over the Cuckoo's Nest.
- Provincial (2012), the first solo album by Canadian musician John K. Samson features 2 songs referencing the Ninette Sanatorium, "When I Write my Masters Thesis" and "Letter in Icelandic from the Ninette San".
- The Austrian-American Jewish poet and artist Samuel Greenberg wrote three poems about his experiences in sanatoria, including "Wards Island Symphonique." (2014)
- Major story elements of the 2015 drama horror video game Until Dawn are set in and around the fictional abandoned Blackwood Sanitorium.
- Czarne stokrotki (2025) is a Polish TV series, which features Black Daisy: a resort, spa, medical and rejuvenation clinic.

== See also ==
- Battle Creek Sanitarium (Michigan, United States)
- Hospice
- Leper colony
- List of sanatoria in the United States
