= Fidelity (disambiguation) =

Fidelity is the quality of faithfulness or loyalty.

Fidelity may also refer to:

== Arts and entertainment ==
=== Film and television ===
- Fidelity (2000 film) (La Fidélité), a French drama film
- Fidelity (2019 film), a Russian drama film
- "Fidelity" (House), an episode of the TV series

=== Music ===
- Fidelity (album), a 2025 album by Yaya Bey
- Fidelity, a 1996 album by The Durutti Column
- "Fidelity", a composition by Joseph Haydn
- "Fidelity" (song), by Regina Spektor, 2006
- "Fidelity", a song by Starsailor from their 2003 album Silence Is Easy

=== Other uses in arts and entertainment ===
- Fidelity (art and symbolism), a personification in Western art of the secular aspect of faith, or trust
- Fidelity (novel), by Susan Glaspell, 1915

== Businesses and organisations ==
- Fidelity Investments, commonly referred to as Fidelity, a multinational financial services corporation
- Fidelity International, an investment management company, spun off from Fidelity Investments
- Fidelity and Deposit Company, an American trust company
- Fidelity Bank Ghana, a commercial bank
- Fidelity Bank Nigeria, or Fidelity Bank Plc, a commercial bank
- Fidelity Commercial Bank Limited, now SBM Bank Kenya Limited
- Fidelity Communications, an American telecommunications company
- Fidelity National Financial, an American mortgage company
- Fidelity National Information Services, or FIS, an American financial services company
- Fidelity Printers and Refinery, a Zimbabwean security printing and gold refinery company
- Fidelity Southern Corporation, an American financial holding company
- Fidelity Trust Company, a former American bank

== Places ==
- Fidelity, Illinois, U.S.
- Fidelity Township, Jersey County, Illinois, U.S.
- Fidelity, Missouri, U.S.

== Ships ==
- HMS Fidelity (D57), a Royal Navy Special Service Vessel lost in the Second World War
- USS Fidelity, more than one ship of the U.S. Navy

== Other uses ==
- Fidelity of quantum states, in quantum information theory
- WFID Fidelity, a radio station in Puerto Rico
- Fidelity (Anglican), a defunct organization in the Anglican Church of Canada
- Fidelity (molecular biology)

== See also ==
- Fidelity Building (disambiguation)
- High fidelity (disambiguation)
- Lo-fi (disambiguation)
- Infidelity (disambiguation)
- Fidelity bond, a form of insurance protection
- "Fidelity Fiduciary Bank", a song from Walt Disney's film Mary Poppins
- Fidelity Medallion, a decoration of the U.S. military
- The Fidelity Ultimate Chess Challenge, a 1991 chess video game
