= Elsah Township, Jersey County, Illinois =

Elsah Township
- Township
- Location in Jersey County

- Jersey County's location in Illinois
- Coordinates: 38°57′49″N 90°19′38″W
- Country: United States
- State: Illinois
- County: Jersey
- Established: November 5, 1878

Area
  - Total: 26.50 sq mi (68.6 km^{2})
  - Land: 23.87 sq mi (61.8 km^{2})
  - Water: 2.63 sq mi (6.8 km^{2}) 9.93%
- Elevation: 460 ft (140 m)

Population (2020)
  - Total: 2,194
  - Density: 91.91/sq mi (35.49/km^{2})
- Time zone: UTC-6 (CST)
  - Summer (DST): UTC-5 (CDT)
- ZIP codes: 62022, 62028, 62035, 62037
- FIPS code: 17-083-23789

Elsah Township is one of eleven townships in Jersey County, Illinois, United States. As of the 2020 census, its population was 2,194 and it contained 939 housing units.

== Geography ==
According to the 2021 census gazetteer files, Elsah Township has a total area of 26.50 square miles (68.63 km^{2}), of which 23.87 square miles (61.82 km^{2}) (or 90.07%) is land and 2.63 square miles (6.81 km^{2}) (or 9.93%) is water.

=== Cities, towns, villages ===
- Elsah

=== Unincorporated towns ===
- Beltrees
- Chautauqua
- Lockhaven

=== Adjacent townships ===
- Mississippi Township (north)
- Godfrey Township, Madison County (east)
- Quarry Township (west)
- Otter Creek Township (northwest)

=== Cemeteries ===
The township contains these three cemeteries: Elsah, Saint Michaels and Wendle.

=== Major highways ===
- Illinois Route 3
- Illinois Route 100
- Illinois Route 109

== Demographics ==
As of the 2020 census there were 2,194 people, 778 households, and 457 families residing in the township. The population density was 82.78 inhabitants per square mile (31.96/km^{2}). There were 939 housing units at an average density of 35.43 per square mile (13.68/km^{2}). The racial makeup of the township was 89.97% White, 2.92% African American, 0.09% Native American, 1.05% Asian, 0.14% Pacific Islander, 0.59% from other races, and 5.24% from two or more races. Hispanic or Latino of any race were 2.55% of the population.

There were 778 households, out of which 22.50% had children under the age of 18 living with them, 51.54% were married couples living together, 5.66% had a female householder with no spouse present, and 41.26% were non-families. 35.50% of all households were made up of individuals, and 29.60% had someone living alone who was 65 years of age or older. The average household size was 2.48 and the average family size was 3.32.

The township's age distribution consisted of 11.2% under the age of 18, 31.0% from 18 to 24, 13.1% from 25 to 44, 24.9% from 45 to 64, and 19.9% who were 65 years of age or older. The median age was 37.3 years. For every 100 females, there were 103.2 males. For every 100 females age 18 and over, there were 110.6 males.

The median income for a household in the township was $66,094, and the median income for a family was $107,120. Males had a median income of $25,917 versus $10,560 for females. The per capita income for the township was $28,183. About 4.8% of families and 6.6% of the population were below the poverty line, including 8.9% of those under age 18 and 6.4% of those age 65 or over.

Historical population
Census	Pop.	Note	%±
2000	2,429		—
2010	2,462		1.4%
2020	2,194		−10.9%
U.S. Decennial Census

== School districts ==
- Alton Community Unit School District 11
- Jersey Community Unit School District 100

== Political districts ==
- Illinois's 19th congressional district
- State House District 97
- State House District 111
- State Senate District 49
- State Senate District 56
