= Mississippi Township, Jersey County, Illinois =

Mississippi Township
- Township
- Location in Jersey County

- Jersey County's location in Illinois
- Coordinates: 39°02′28″N 90°18′38″W
- Country: United States
- State: Illinois
- County: Jersey
- Established: November 5, 1878

Area
  - Total: 36.39 sq mi (94.2 km^{2})
  - Land: 36.36 sq mi (94.2 km^{2})
  - Water: 0.04 sq mi (0.10 km^{2}) 0.10%
- Elevation: 659 ft (201 m)

Population (2020)
  - Total: 1,785
  - Density: 49.09/sq mi (18.95/km^{2})
- Time zone: UTC-6 (CST)
  - Summer (DST): UTC-5 (CDT)
- ZIP codes: 62022, 62035, 62052
- FIPS code: 17-083-49672

Mississippi Township is one of eleven townships in Jersey County, Illinois, United States. As of the 2020 census, its population was 1,785 and it contained 792 housing units.

== Geography ==
According to the 2021 census gazetteer files, Mississippi Township has a total area of 36.39 square miles (94.25 km^{2}), of which 36.36 square miles (94.17 km^{2}) (or 99.90%) is land and 0.04 square miles (0.10 km^{2}) (or 0.10%) is water.

=== Unincorporated towns ===
- Delhi
- Dow
- East Newbern
- McClusky
- New Delhi
- Newbern

=== Adjacent townships ===
- Jersey Township (north)
- Fidelity Township (northeast)
- Piasa Township (east)
- Godfrey Township, Madison County (southeast)
- Elsah Township (south)
- Otter Creek Township (west)
- English Township (northwest)

=== Cemeteries ===
The township contains these five cemeteries: Bethel, Lamb Memorial, Lurton, Newbern and Van Horn.

=== Major highways ===
- U.S. Route 67
- Illinois Route 3
- Illinois Route 109

=== Airports and landing strips ===
- William E Koenig Airport

== Demographics ==
As of the 2020 census there were 1,785 people, 644 households, and 514 families residing in the township. The population density was 49.05 inhabitants per square mile (18.94/km^{2}). There were 792 housing units at an average density of 21.76 per square mile (8.40/km^{2}). The racial makeup of the township was 95.74% White, 0.50% African American, 0.11% Native American, 0.06% Asian, 0.00% Pacific Islander, 0.28% from other races, and 3.31% from two or more races. Hispanic or Latino of any race were 0.84% of the population.

There were 644 households, out of which 34.20% had children under the age of 18 living with them, 70.03% were married couples living together, 2.33% had a female householder with no spouse present, and 20.19% were non-families. 12.10% of all households were made up of individuals, and 4.70% had someone living alone who was 65 years of age or older. The average household size was 2.95 and the average family size was 3.25.

The township's age distribution consisted of 22.8% under the age of 18, 4.9% from 18 to 24, 31.2% from 25 to 44, 25.4% from 45 to 64, and 15.6% who were 65 years of age or older. The median age was 33.4 years. For every 100 females, there were 112.3 males. For every 100 females age 18 and over, there were 109.1 males.

The median income for a household in the township was $107,500, and the median income for a family was $114,122. Males had a median income of $60,417 versus $32,265 for females. The per capita income for the township was $40,467. About 1.8% of families and 3.9% of the population were below the poverty line, including 2.8% of those under age 18 and 15.5% of those age 65 or over.

Historical population
Census	Pop.	Note	%±
2000	1,988		—
2010	2,041		2.7%
2020	1,785		−12.5%
U.S. Decennial Census

== School districts ==
- Jersey Community Unit School District 100

== Political districts ==
- Illinois' 19th congressional district
- State House District 97
- State Senate District 49
