= Jersey Township, Jersey County, Illinois =

Jersey Township
- Township
- Location in Jersey County

- Jersey County's location in Illinois
- Coordinates: 39°08′48″N 90°18′15″W
- Country: United States
- State: Illinois
- County: Jersey
- Established: November 5, 1878

Area
  - Total: 46.99 sq mi (121.7 km^{2})
  - Land: 46.96 sq mi (121.6 km^{2})
  - Water: 0.03 sq mi (0.078 km^{2}) 0.06%
- Elevation: 581 ft (177 m)

Population (2020)
  - Total: 9,995
  - Density: 212.8/sq mi (82.18/km^{2})
- Time zone: UTC-6 (CST)
  - Summer (DST): UTC-5 (CDT)
- ZIP codes: 62052, 62054
- FIPS code: 17-083-38401

Jersey Township is one of eleven townships in Jersey County, Illinois, United States. As of the 2020 census, its population was 9,995 and it contained 4,487 housing units.

== Geography ==
According to the 2021 census gazetteer files, Jersey Township has a total area of 46.99 square miles (121.70 km^{2}), of which 46.96 square miles (121.63 km^{2}) (or 99.94%) is land and 0.03 square miles (0.08 km^{2}) (or 0.06%) is water.

=== Cities, towns, villages ===
- Jerseyville

=== Adjacent townships ===
- Rockbridge Township, Greene County (northeast)
- Ruyle Township (northeast)
- Fidelity Township (east)
- Piasa Township (southeast)
- Mississippi Township (south)
- Otter Creek Township (southwest)
- English Township (west)
- Kane Township, Greene County (northwest)

=== Cemeteries ===
The township contains these three cemeteries: Keller, Oak Grove and Saint Francis Xavier.

=== Major highways ===
- U.S. Route 67
- Illinois Route 16
- Illinois Route 109

=== Airports and landing strips ===
- Jersey Community Hospital heliport
- Jerseyville Aviation Airport

=== Landmarks ===
- American Legion Fairgrounds

== Demographics ==
As of the 2020 census there were 9,995 people, 3,808 households, and 2,360 families residing in the township. The population density was 212.71 inhabitants per square mile (82.13/km^{2}). There were 4,487 housing units at an average density of 95.49 per square mile (36.87/km^{2}). The racial makeup of the township was 94.22% White, 0.44% African American, 0.08% Native American, 0.36% Asian, 0.00% Pacific Islander, 0.42% from other races, and 4.48% from two or more races. Hispanic or Latino of any race were 1.33% of the population.

There were 3,808 households, out of which 30.70% had children under the age of 18 living with them, 48.82% were married couples living together, 8.04% had a female householder with no spouse present, and 38.03% were non-families. 34.30% of all households were made up of individuals, and 13.70% had someone living alone who was 65 years of age or older. The average household size was 2.47 and the average family size was 3.19.

The township's age distribution consisted of 22.1% under the age of 18, 8.2% from 18 to 24, 22% from 25 to 44, 28.9% from 45 to 64, and 18.8% who were 65 years of age or older. The median age was 42.9 years. For every 100 females, there were 83.9 males. For every 100 females age 18 and over, there were 82.3 males.

The median income for a household in the township was $64,082, and the median income for a family was $93,864. Males had a median income of $46,724 versus $33,143 for females. The per capita income for the township was $32,579. About 4.9% of families and 9.1% of the population were below the poverty line, including 11.3% of those under age 18 and 6.8% of those age 65 or over.

Historical population
Census	Pop.	Note	%±
2000	9,428		—
2010	10,165		7.8%
2020	9,995		−1.7%
U.S. Decennial Census

== School districts ==
- Jersey Community Unit School District 100
- Southwestern Community Unit School District 9

== Political districts ==
- Illinois's 13th congressional district
- State House District 100
- State Senate District 50
