= Illinois Department of Juvenile Justice =

State agency in Illinois, United States

Department of Juvenile Justice
Department overview
- Formed: July 1, 2006
- Jurisdiction: Illinois
- Department executive: Heidi Meuller, Director
- Website: www.illinois.gov/idjj/

The Illinois Department of Juvenile Justice (IDJJ) is the code department of the Illinois state government that acts as the state juvenile corrections agency.

The department was formed on July 1, 2006. Previously, the Illinois Department of Corrections managed Illinois' juvenile facilities.

== Facilities ==
As of 2014, the Illinois Youth Center (IYC) facilities in operation included the following detention centers, statewide:

Name	Security level	Sex
IYC Chicago	Level 2 - Medium	Male
IYC Harrisburg	Level 2 - Medium	Male
IYC Pere Marquette	Level 3 - Minimum	Male
IYC St. Charles	Level 2 - Medium	Male
IYC Warrenville	Level 1 - Maximum	Co-ed

Harrisburg, St. Charles, Pere Marquette, and Chicago house juvenile male offenders while Warrenville houses juvenile female offenders. IYC Pere Marquette, located in Quarry Township, Jersey County, is a treatment facility for juvenile males. The majority of youths committed to the department from the Chicago area go first to IYC St. Charles.

Facilities in Kewanee and Murphysboro, previously Illinois Youth Centers, were closed and reopened as Adult Life Skills and Reentry Centers.

== See also ==
- Juvenile delinquency
- Juvenile Justice and Delinquency Prevention Act
- Office of Juvenile Justice and Delinquency Prevention
