= River Bend (Illinois) =

Illinois region by the Mississippi river

Coordinates: 39°00′N 90°20′W

The River Bend
- Region of Illinois
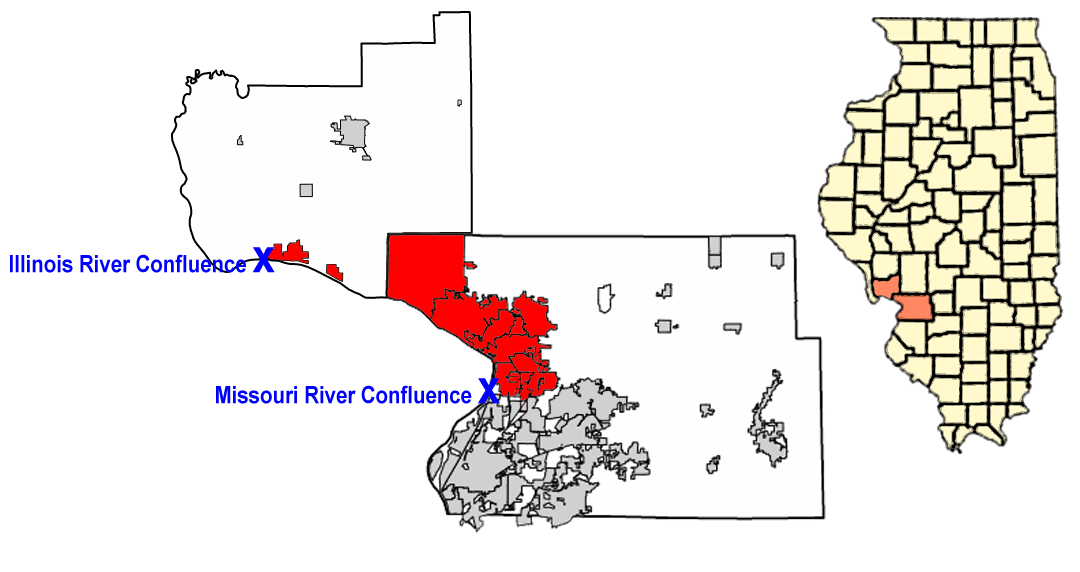
- Communities within The River Bend
- Country: United States
- State: Illinois

The River Bend is a small region in western central Illinois and southern Illinois that comprises parts of Madison County and Jersey County. The name comes from a section of the Mississippi River that flows roughly west to east instead of the usual north to south, causing a bend in the river. The area is within the Metro East region, which is within the Greater St. Louis Metropolitan area.

The western boundary is dictated by the flow of the Mississippi river, beginning at the confluence of the Illinois and ending at the confluence of the Missouri. The eastern boundary stretches through a contiguous urbanized area revolving around the cities of Alton and Wood River.

== List of communities within the River Bend ==
=== Cities ===
- Alton
- Grafton
- Wood River

=== Villages ===
- Bethalto
- East Alton
- Elsah
- Godfrey
- Hartford
- Roxana
- South Roxana

=== Census-designated places ===
- Cottage Hills
- Rosewood Heights

=== Unincorporated communities ===
- Chautauqua (semi-private community)
- Fosterburg
- Lockhaven
- Meadowbrook
- Moro
- Wanda
