= Rosedale Township, Jersey County, Illinois =

Rosedale Township
- Township
- Location in Jersey County

- Jersey County's location in Illinois
- Coordinates: 39°02′39″N 90°32′06″W
- Country: United States
- State: Illinois
- County: Jersey
- Established: November 5, 1878

Area
  - Total: 32.14 sq mi (83.2 km^{2})
  - Land: 30.26 sq mi (78.4 km^{2})
  - Water: 1.87 sq mi (4.8 km^{2}) 5.83%
- Elevation: 604 ft (184 m)

Population (2020)
  - Total: 415
  - Density: 13.7/sq mi (5.30/km^{2})
- Time zone: UTC-6 (CST)
  - Summer (DST): UTC-5 (CDT)
- ZIP codes: 62031, 62037
- FIPS code: 17-083-65689

Rosedale Township is one of eleven townships in Jersey County, Illinois, United States. As of the 2020 census, its population was 415 and it contained 267 housing units.

== History ==
The name of Rosedale Township was changed from Illinois Township on June 7, 1882.

== Geography ==
According to the 2021 census gazetteer files, Rosedale Township has a total area of 32.14 square miles (83.24 km^{2}), of which 30.26 square miles (78.37 km^{2}) (or 94.17%) is land and 1.87 square miles (4.84 km^{2}) (or 5.83%) is water.

=== Unincorporated towns ===
- Nutwood
- Rosedale

=== Adjacent townships ===
- Richwood Township (north)
- English Township (northeast)
- Otter Creek Township (east)
- Quarry Township (southeast)

=== Cemeteries ===
The township contains two active cemeteries, Meadow Branch and Rosedale, as well as several that are inactive.

=== Major highways ===
- Illinois Route 100

=== Rivers ===
- Illinois River

=== Lakes ===
- Beaver Lake
- Deep Lake
- Eagle Lake
- Flat Lake
- Fowler Lake
- Upper Flat Lake

=== Landmarks ===
- Pere Marquette State Park

== Demographics ==
As of the 2020 census there were 415 people, 155 households, and 125 families residing in the township. The population density was 12.91 inhabitants per square mile (4.98/km^{2}). There were 267 housing units at an average density of 8.31 per square mile (3.21/km^{2}). The racial makeup of the township was 97.83% White, 0.00% African American, 0.00% Native American, 0.00% Asian, 0.00% Pacific Islander, 0.00% from other races, and 2.17% from two or more races. Hispanic or Latino of any race were 0.48% of the population.

There were 155 households, out of which 29.70% had children under the age of 18 living with them, 76.13% were married couples living together, 4.52% had a female householder with no spouse present, and 19.35% were non-families. 19.40% of all households were made up of individuals, and 16.10% had someone living alone who was 65 years of age or older. The average household size was 2.65 and the average family size was 3.05.

The township's age distribution consisted of 21.2% under the age of 18, 7.8% from 18 to 24, 14.1% from 25 to 44, 34.5% from 45 to 64, and 22.4% who were 65 years of age or older. The median age was 49.3 years. For every 100 females, there were 125.8 males. For every 100 females age 18 and over, there were 110.4 males.

The median income for a household in the township was $51,635, and the median income for a family was $77,589. Males had a median income of $40,000 versus $26,538 for females. The per capita income for the township was $27,008. About 4.0% of families and 6.3% of the population were below the poverty line, including 0.0% of those under age 18 and 21.7% of those age 65 or over.

Historical population
Census	Pop.	Note	%±
2000	482		—
2010	456		−5.4%
2020	415		−9.0%
U.S. Decennial Census

== School districts ==
- Jersey Community Unit School District 100

== Political districts ==
- Illinois' 17th congressional district
- State House District 97
- State Senate District 49
