= Jersey County Journal =

- The August 26, 2009 front page of the Jersey County Journal
- Type: Weekly newspaper
- Format: Broadsheet
- Owner(s): Campbell Publications
- President: Timothy Campbell
- Founded: June 4, 2003
- Headquarters: 832 South State Street, Jerseyville, Illinois, 62052, United States
- Circulation: 11,500 weekly
- Website: jerseycountyjournal.com

The Jersey County Journal is a weekly newspaper that is distributed free to all residents in Jersey County, Illinois with a postal address. It can also be purchased at multiple locations in the county for a cost of one dollar fifty cents ($1.50).

== General information ==
The newspaper was first published on June 4, 2003, and has a circulation of approximately 11,500. The Journal covers the cities and towns of Jerseyville, Brighton, Grafton, Elsah, Kane, Fieldon, and Otterville, as well as the surrounding areas.

== Ownership ==
The Jersey County Journal is a part of Campbell Publications and its president is Timothy Campbell. Other newspapers that are owned by the company include the Calhoun News-Herald, Greene Prairie Press, Scott County Times, and the Pike Press. In 2025, the Journal and four other papers were consolidated together under the name River County News.

== Awards ==
In 2010, The Journal was awarded as the best large weekly newspaper in Southern Illinois by the Southern Illinois Editorial Association. Other awards that the newspaper has won in the past include Best Local News Coverage and Best Editorial Page.
