= Illinois Route 109 =

State highway in Jersey County, Illinois, US

Illinois Route 109
- McClusky Road
- IL 109 highlighted in red

Route information
- Maintained by IDOT
- Length: 8.22 mi (13.23 km)

Major junctions
- South end: IL 3 in Dow
- North end: US 67 in Jerseyville

Location
- Country: United States
- State: Illinois
- Counties: Jersey

Highway system
- Illinois State Highway System; Interstate; US; State; Tollways; Scenic
← IL 108	→ IL 110 (CKC)

Illinois Route 109 (IL 109) is a 8.22-mile-long (13.23 km) minor north–south state road in southwest Illinois. It runs from Illinois Route 3 east of Newbern north to U.S. Route 67 in Jerseyville.

== Route description ==
Illinois 109 is a two-lane, undivided surface road in Jersey County for its entire length. Traveling northbound from IL 3, it goes directly north for a short distance, and then curves. Right after these curves, it passes by unincorporated McClusky, and resumes traveling due north for the remainder of its length. Within the town of Jerseyville, it picks up the name McClusky Road. Its northern terminus is at US 67 (State Street) in Jerseyville.

== History ==
SBI Route 109 originally ran from Grafton to East Newbern (at the corner of modern-day Illinois 3 and Illinois 109) on what is now Illinois 3. In 1947, U.S. 67 was rerouted through New Delhi — the former alignment became Illinois Route 100 south of East Newbern, and Illinois 109 north. In 1987, Illinois 3 took over the 1924 routing of Illinois 109 when Illinois 100 was moved onto a new highway south of Grafton.

In 1987 IDOT announced that the segment of IL 109 from Route 3 to Jerseyville would become an unmarked state highway but it remains IL 109 as of today.

== Junction list ==
The entire route is in Jersey County.

Location	mi	km	Destinations	Notes
Newbern	0.0	0.0	IL 3	Southern terminus
Jerseyville	8.22	13.23	US 67	Northern terminus
1.000 mi = 1.609 km; 1.000 km = 0.621 mi
