= English Township, Jersey County, Illinois =

English Township
- Township
- Location in Jersey County

- Jersey County's location in Illinois
- Coordinates: 39°07′20″N 90°25′43″W
- Country: United States
- State: Illinois
- County: Jersey
- Established: November 5, 1878

Area
  - Total: 36.93 sq mi (95.6 km^{2})
  - Land: 36.92 sq mi (95.6 km^{2})
  - Water: 0.01 sq mi (0.026 km^{2}) 0.02%
- Elevation: 643 ft (196 m)

Population (2020)
  - Total: 461
  - Density: 12.5/sq mi (4.82/km^{2})
- Time zone: UTC-6 (CST)
  - Summer (DST): UTC-5 (CDT)
- ZIP codes: 62031, 62052, 62054
- FIPS code: 17-083-24231

English Township is one of eleven townships in Jersey County, Illinois, United States. As of the 2020 census, its population was 461 and it contained 193 housing units.

== Geography ==
According to the 2021 census gazetteer files, English Township has a total area of 36.93 square miles (95.65 km^{2}), of which 36.92 square miles (95.62 km^{2}) (or 99.98%) is land and 0.01 square miles (0.03 km^{2}) (or 0.02%) is water.

=== Adjacent townships ===
- Kane Township, Greene County (northeast)
- Jersey Township (east)
- Mississippi Township (southeast)
- Otter Creek Township (south)
- Rosedale Township (southwest)
- Richwood Township (west)

=== Cemeteries ===
The township contains these twelve cemeteries: Armstrong, Belt Salem, Brown, Falkner, Grimes, Heitzig, Hetzel, Houseman, Lax, Rowden, Rusk and Saint Marys Catholic.

=== Major highways ===
- Illinois Route 16

== Demographics ==
As of the 2020 census there were 461 people, 177 households, and 138 families residing in the township. The population density was 12.48 inhabitants per square mile (4.82/km^{2}). There were 193 housing units at an average density of 5.23 per square mile (2.02/km^{2}). The racial makeup of the township was 95.66% White, 0.00% African American, 0.00% Native American, 0.00% Asian, 0.00% Pacific Islander, 0.22% from other races, and 4.12% from two or more races. Hispanic or Latino of any race were 0.87% of the population.

There were 177 households, out of which 33.90% had children under the age of 18 living with them, 73.45% were married couples living together, 0.00% had a female householder with no spouse present, and 22.03% were non-families. 22.00% of all households were made up of individuals, and 6.20% had someone living alone who was 65 years of age or older. The average household size was 2.99 and the average family size was 3.55.

The township's age distribution consisted of 31.6% under the age of 18, 4.5% from 18 to 24, 18.6% from 25 to 44, 39.6% from 45 to 64, and 5.9% who were 65 years of age or older. The median age was 40.2 years. For every 100 females, there were 129.0 males. For every 100 females age 18 and over, there were 98.9 males.

The median income for a household in the township was $91,607, and the median income for a family was $107,500. Males had a median income of $55,714 versus $32,212 for females. The per capita income for the township was $34,195. About 0.0% of families and 1.1% of the population were below the poverty line, including 0.0% of those under age 18 and 19.4% of those age 65 or over.

Historical population
Census	Pop.	Note	%±
2000	536		—
2010	487		−9.1%
2020	461		−5.3%
U.S. Decennial Census

== School districts ==
- Jersey Community Unit School District 100

== Political districts ==
- Illinois' 17th congressional district
- State House District 97
- State Senate District 49
