= Richwood Township, Jersey County, Illinois =

Richwood Township
- Township
- Location in Jersey County

- Jersey County's location in Illinois
- Coordinates: 39°08′12″N 90°33′01″W
- Country: United States
- State: Illinois
- County: Jersey
- Established: November 5, 1878

Area
  - Total: 37.81 sq mi (97.9 km^{2})
  - Land: 37.56 sq mi (97.3 km^{2})
  - Water: 0.25 sq mi (0.65 km^{2}) 0.65%
- Elevation: 476 ft (145 m)

Population (2020)
  - Total: 526
  - Density: 14.0/sq mi (5.41/km^{2})
- Time zone: UTC-6 (CST)
  - Summer (DST): UTC-5 (CDT)
- ZIP codes: 62031
- FIPS code: 17-083-63745

Richwood Township is one of eleven townships in Jersey County, Illinois, United States. As of the 2020 census, its population was 526 and it contained 273 housing units.

== Geography ==
According to the 2021 census gazetteer files, Richwood Township has a total area of 37.81 square miles (97.93 km^{2}), of which 37.56 square miles (97.28 km^{2}) (or 99.35%) is land and 0.25 square miles (0.65 km^{2}) (or 0.65%) is water.

=== Cities, towns, villages ===
- Fieldon

=== Unincorporated towns ===
- Spankey

=== Adjacent townships ===
- Woodville Township, Greene County (north)
- Kane Township, Greene County (northeast)
- English Township (east)
- Otter Creek Township (southeast)
- Rosedale Township (south)

=== Cemeteries ===
The township contains these three cemeteries: Gunterman, Reddish and Reddish-Dunham Ford.

=== Major highways ===
- Illinois Route 16
- Illinois Route 100

=== Rivers ===
- Illinois River

== Demographics ==
As of the 2020 census there were 526 people, 175 households, and 115 families residing in the township. The population density was 13.91 inhabitants per square mile (5.37/km^{2}). There were 273 housing units at an average density of 7.22 per square mile (2.79/km^{2}). The racial makeup of the township was 96.58% White, 0.00% African American, 0.00% Native American, 0.00% Asian, 0.00% Pacific Islander, 0.00% from other races, and 3.42% from two or more races. Hispanic or Latino of any race were 2.09% of the population.

There were 175 households, out of which 21.70% had children under the age of 18 living with them, 54.29% were married couples living together, 0.57% had a female householder with no spouse present, and 34.29% were non-families. 33.10% of all households were made up of individuals, and 23.40% had someone living alone who was 65 years of age or older. The average household size was 2.24 and the average family size was 2.87.

The township's age distribution consisted of 14.5% under the age of 18, 3.6% from 18 to 24, 13.6% from 25 to 44, 28.6% from 45 to 64, and 39.8% who were 65 years of age or older. The median age was 56.6 years. For every 100 females, there were 98.0 males. For every 100 females age 18 and over, there were 84.1 males.

The median income for a household in the township was $65,313, and the median income for a family was $98,375. Males had a median income of $49,531 versus $20,714 for females. The per capita income for the township was $32,479. None of the population was below the poverty line.

Historical population
Census	Pop.	Note	%±
2000	664		—
2010	653		−1.7%
2020	526		−19.4%
U.S. Decennial Census

== School districts ==
- Jersey Community Unit School District 100

== Political districts ==
- Illinois's 17th congressional district
- State House District 97
- State Senate District 49
