= Nutwood, Illinois =

Nutwood
- Unincorporated community
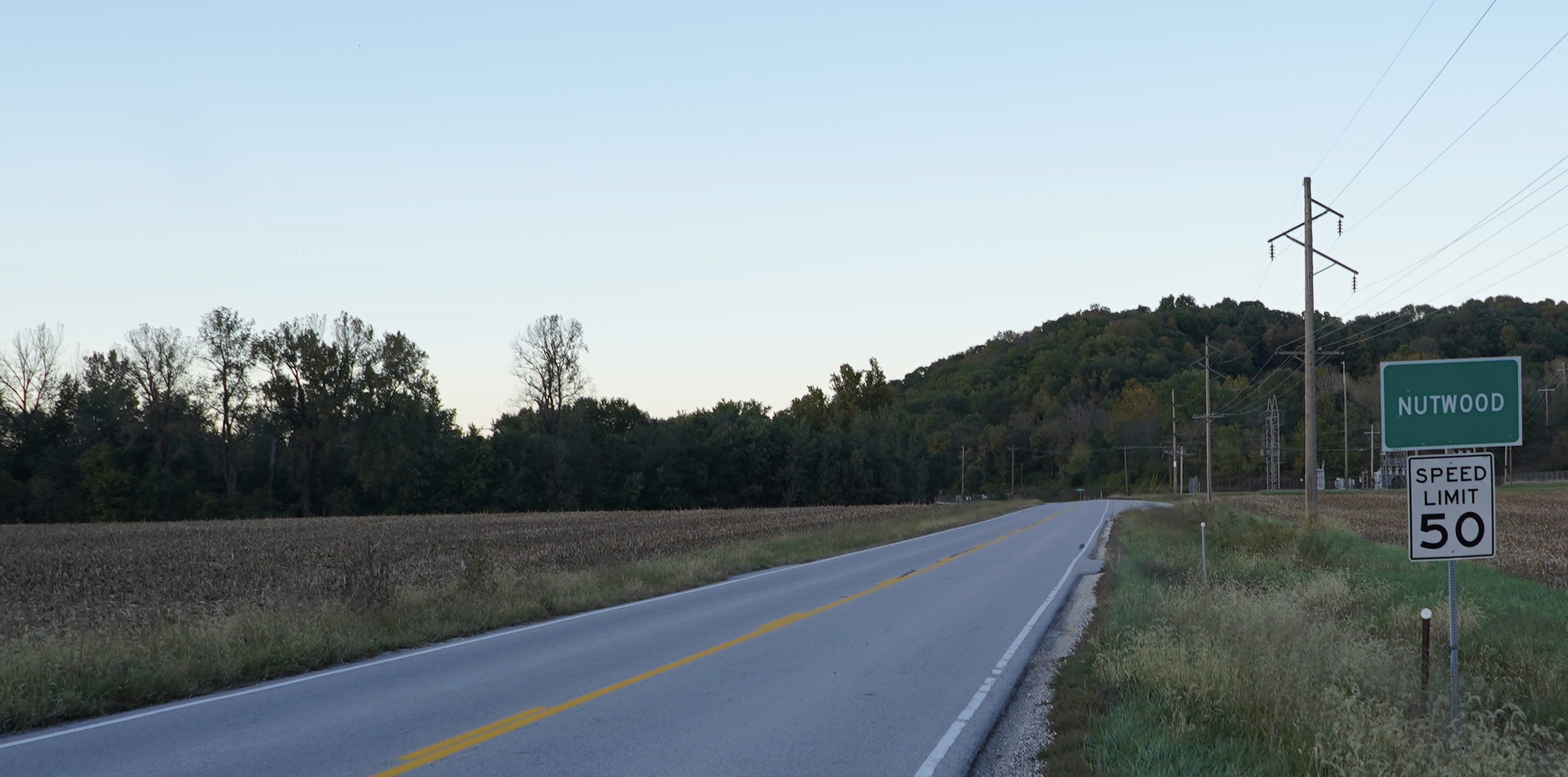
- Sign for Nutwood

- Location of Nutwood within Illinois Nutwood (the United States)
- Coordinates: 39°05′05″N 90°33′21″W
- Country: United States
- State: Illinois
- County: Jersey
- Township: Rosedale
- Elevation: 449 ft (137 m)
- Time zone: UTC-6 (CST)
  - Summer (DST): UTC-5 (CDT)
- Area code: 618
- GNIS feature ID: 414739

Nutwood is an unincorporated community in Jersey County, Illinois, United States. It is located along Illinois Route 100, about four miles west-southwest of Fieldon.
