= Infidelity (disambiguation) =

Infidelity is the act of unfaithfulness towards a romantic partner.

Infidelity may also refer to:

- Infidelity (1917 film), a lost American silent film
- Infidelity (1987 film), an American made-for-television film
- Infidelity (2004 film), a made-for-television film starring Kim Delaney
- In Olden Days, a 1952 Italian anthology film also known as Infidelity

== See also ==
- Fidelity (disambiguation)
- Cheating (disambiguation)
- Adultery (disambiguation)
- Unfaithful (disambiguation)
- Affair (disambiguation)
