= Jersey Township =

Jersey Township may refer to:

- Jersey Township, Jersey County, Illinois
- Jersey Township, Licking County, Ohio
