= Quarry Township, Jersey County, Illinois =

Quarry Township
- Township
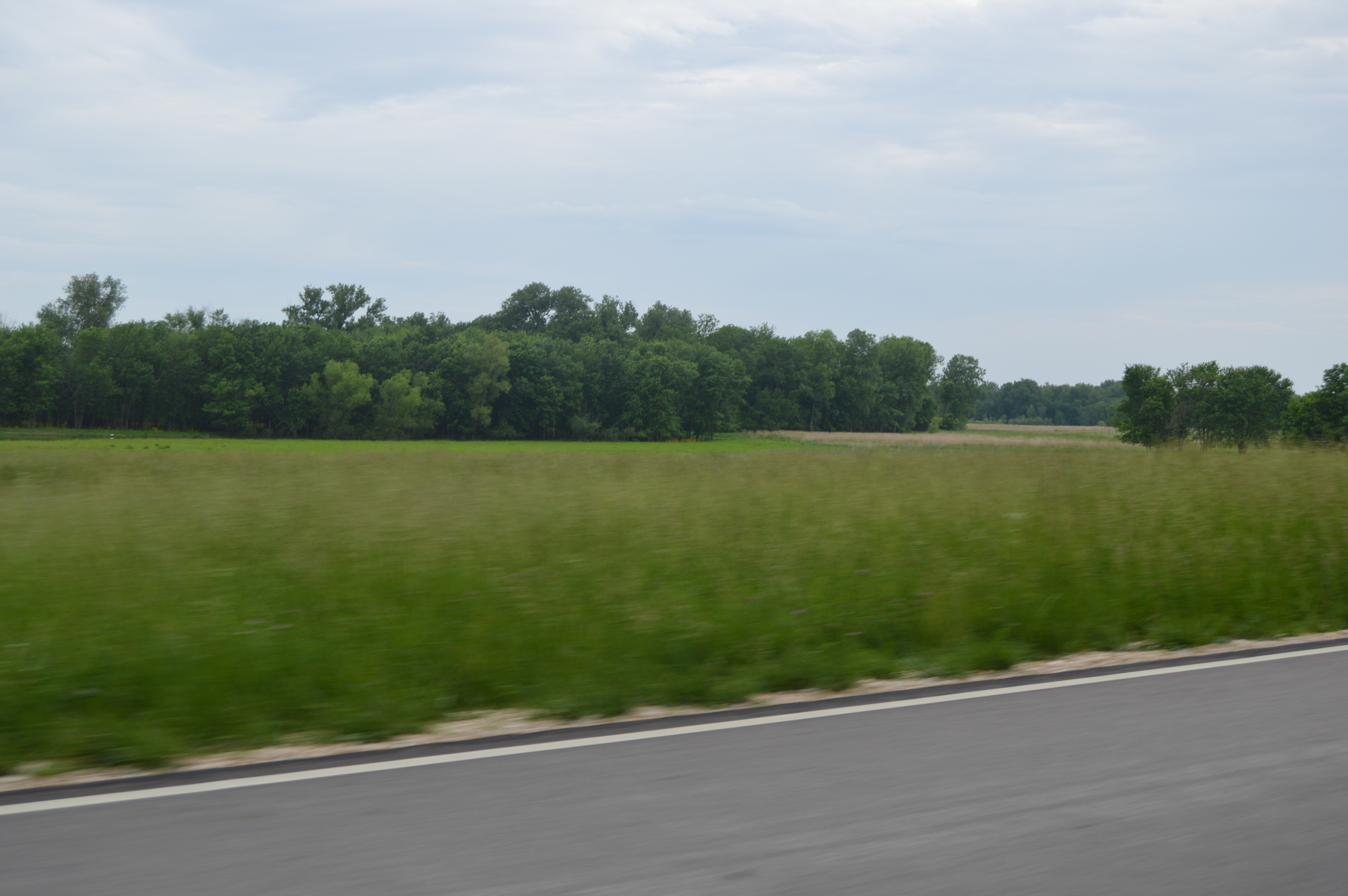
- Fields west of Grafton

- Location in Jersey County

- Jersey County's location in Illinois
- Coordinates: 38°59′08″N 90°28′34″W
- Country: United States
- State: Illinois
- County: Jersey
- Established: November 5, 1878

Area
  - Total: 23.23 sq mi (60.2 km^{2})
  - Land: 20.51 sq mi (53.1 km^{2})
  - Water: 2.72 sq mi (7.0 km^{2}) 11.71%
- Elevation: 794 ft (242 m)

Population (2020)
  - Total: 1,039
  - Density: 50.66/sq mi (19.56/km^{2})
- Time zone: UTC-6 (CST)
  - Summer (DST): UTC-5 (CDT)
- ZIP codes: 62028, 62031, 62037
- FIPS code: 17-083-62354

Quarry Township is one of eleven townships in Jersey County, Illinois, United States. As of the 2020 census, its population was 1,039 and it contained 609 housing units.

== History ==
The name of Quarry Township was changed from Grafton Township on April 1, 1880.

== Geography ==
According to the 2021 census gazetteer files, Quarry Township has a total area of 23.23 square miles (60.17 km^{2}), of which 20.51 square miles (53.12 km^{2}) (or 88.29%) is land and 2.72 square miles (7.04 km^{2}) (or 11.71%) is water.

=== Cities, towns, villages ===
- Grafton

=== Adjacent townships ===
- Otter Creek Township (northeast)
- Elsah Township (east)
- Rosedale Township (northwest)

=== Cemeteries ===
The township contains these two cemeteries: Hartford and Scenic Hill.

=== Major highways ===
- Illinois Route 3
- Illinois Route 100

=== Airports and landing strips ===
- Department of Corrections heliport

=== Rivers ===
- Illinois River

=== Lakes ===
- Gilbert Lake
- Lower Stump Lake

=== Landmarks ===
- Pere Marquette State Park

== Demographics ==
As of the 2020 census there were 1,039 people, 437 households, and 280 families residing in the township. The population density was 44.73 inhabitants per square mile (17.27/km^{2}). There were 609 housing units at an average density of 26.22 per square mile (10.12/km^{2}). The racial makeup of the township was 91.72% White, 1.44% African American, 0.00% Native American, 0.48% Asian, 0.00% Pacific Islander, 0.00% from other races, and 6.35% from two or more races. Hispanic or Latino of any race were 1.73% of the population.

There were 437 households, out of which 19.20% had children under the age of 18 living with them, 55.61% were married couples living together, 6.64% had a female householder with no spouse present, and 35.93% were non-families. 33.60% of all households were made up of individuals, and 22.00% had someone living alone who was 65 years of age or older. The average household size was 2.05 and the average family size was 2.59.

The township's age distribution consisted of 16.8% under the age of 18, 4.5% from 18 to 24, 14.6% from 25 to 44, 27.7% from 45 to 64, and 36.4% who were 65 years of age or older. The median age was 56.7 years. For every 100 females, there were 98.7 males. For every 100 females age 18 and over, there were 86.6 males.

The median income for a household in the township was $60,361, and the median income for a family was $86,667. Males had a median income of $61,250 versus $40,516 for females. The per capita income for the township was $37,138. About 12.9% of families and 17.2% of the population were below the poverty line, including 18.2% of those under age 18 and 6.7% of those age 65 or over.

Historical population
| Census | Pop. | Note | %± |
|---|---|---|---|
| 2000 | 1,084 | | — |
| 2010 | 1,174 | | 8.3% |
| 2020 | 1,039 | | −11.5% |
U.S. Decennial Census

== School districts ==
- Jersey Community Unit School District 100

== Political districts ==
- Illinois' 17th congressional district
- State House District 97
- State Senate District 49
