= Carrie Thomas Alexander-Bahrenberg =

Alexander-Bahrenberg

Carrie Thomas Alexander-Bahrenberg (March 4, 1861 – November 24, 1929) was a member of the University of Illinois board of trustees and a Republican civic and political activist.

== Personal ==
She was born as Caroline Thomas in Belleville, Illinois, on March 4, 1861, the daughter of John Thomas of Virginia and Magdalena Von Ave of Switzerland.

She was graduated from Monticello Seminary, Godfrey, Illinois, in 1880 as class valedictorian, at which event she gave an address on "The Differential and Integral Calculus." She also spoke in June 1913 at the 75th anniversary celebration of the founding of the seminary and at a reunion luncheon in June 1915.

Her first husband was Daniel P. or Henry Alexander, who died in 1887.

Married to William Bahrenberg, a physician, she lived in Belleville, Illinois. In 1909 she was living in Belvidere, Illinois.

She died on November 24, 1929, in St. Louis, Missouri, and was buried in Valhalla Cemetery in St. Louis County.

== Business activities ==
Upon the 1887 death of her first husband, Mrs. Bahrenberg took over the management of the St. Louis, Belleville & Suburban street railway system in Delhi, Illinois, a suburb of St. Louis. In an address to the Chicago Woman's Club in November 1909 titled "Woman's Ability to Do Man's Work," she said:

My former husband barely had started the road ... when his death forced me to take up the work. For five years, I managed every detail, leading in the work of clearing away snow blockades early in the winter mornings.

== Civic activities ==
=== University of Illinois ===
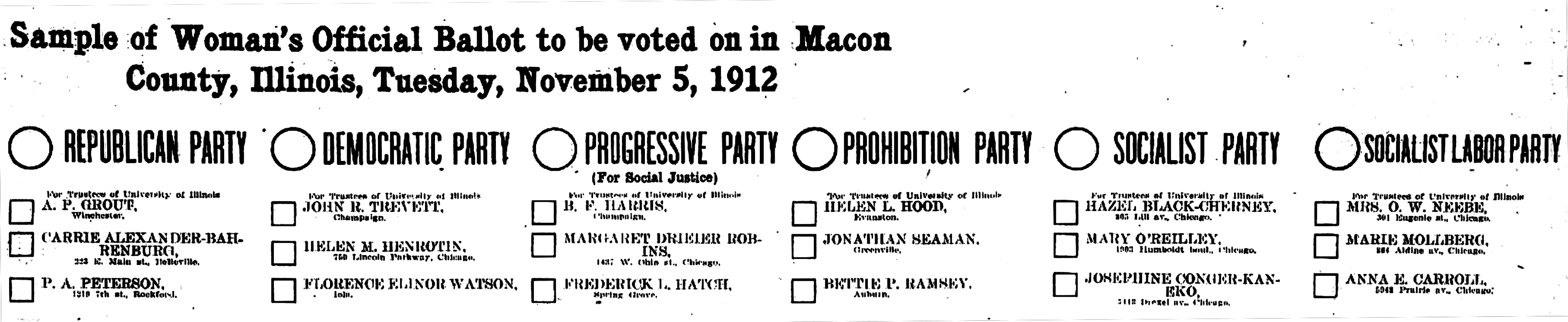
Newspaper illustration of an Illinois ballot for women, who in 1912 were allowed to vote only for trustees of the state university. Alexander-Bahrenberg is listed in the first column as part of the Republican slate of candidates.

Known as Mrs. Carrie A.-Bahrenberg or Carrie Alexander-Bahrenburg, she was a member of the board of trustees of the University of Illinois from either 1898 or 1900 to 1912.

Alexander-Bahrenburg said that she "gladly" gave time to serving on the board, "where the average man with others depending on him possibly could not be so free. It is my belief that this board should always include a woman. The law is lax upon the subject, stating only that a woman 'may' serve. Therefore the woman member should be the one who is willing to fight and hold her ground."

She said she did not work for the other candidates on the Republican ticket because "there is no use in being interested in the offices I am not permitted to vote for."

In 1912, Illinois women were allowed to cast ballots only for University of Illinois trustees, not for any other candidates in any state or national election.

Alexander-Bahrenberg was noted for her years of "outspoken disagreement" with university President Edward J. James, with "her colleagues on the board, and [with] other partisans of the University."

Nevertheless, she said she held no animosity for James, and she even entertained him and his wife "lavishly" in her home. "But when it comes to business, I know neither friend nor foe," she said.

She was instrumental in defeating a legislative appropriation for a veterinary sciences department at the university. "Since that time," according to one newspaper account, "the university administration and President Abbott of the trustees" worked against her reelection.

In 1912, she faced opposition in the Republican state convention in Springfield from Mrs. Emmons Blaine, daughter of Medill McCormick, proprietor of the Chicago Tribune.

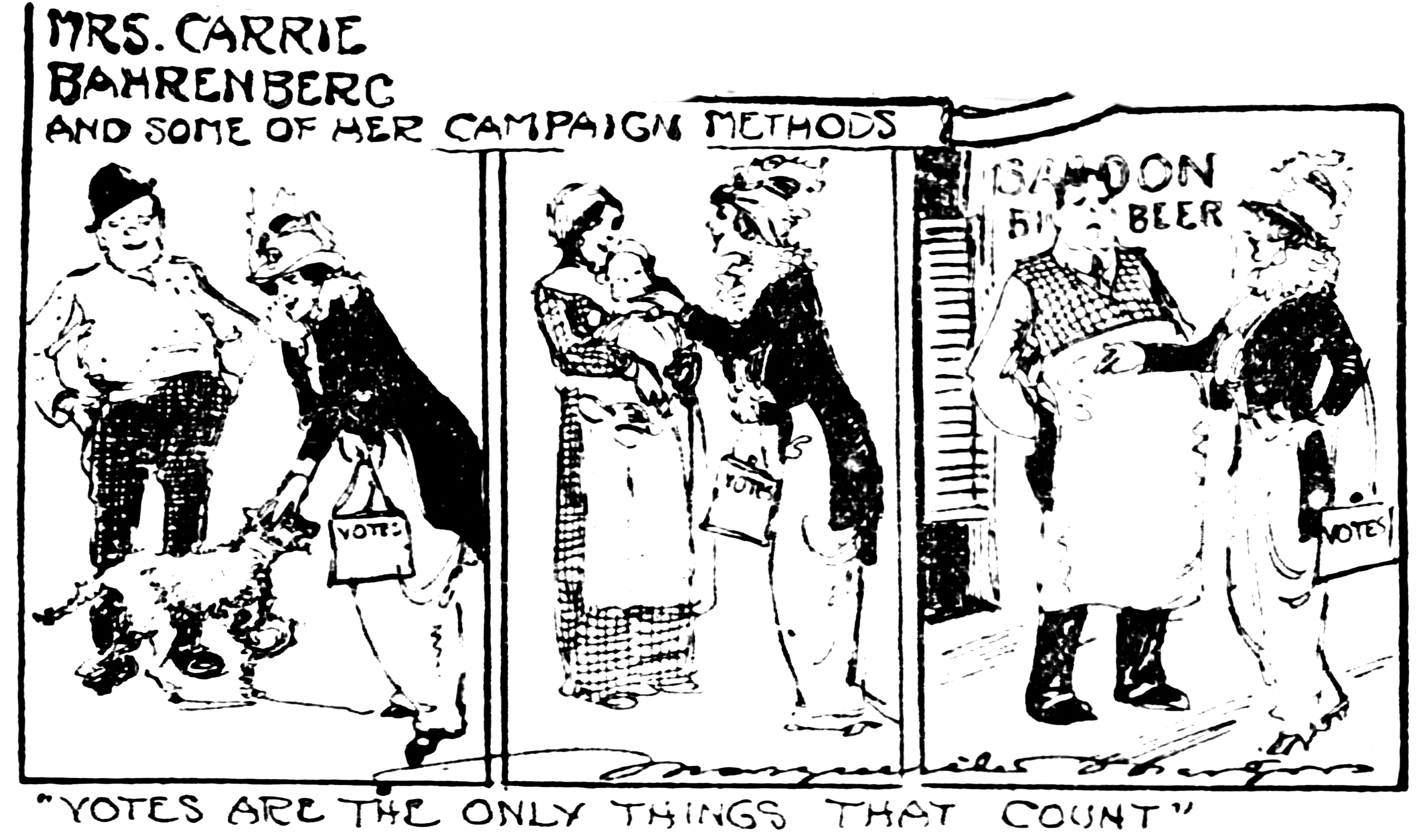
Sketches by St. Louis journalist Marguerite Martyn of Alexander-Bahrenberg campaigning in 1912

She was, however, nominated for reelection "despite the combined opposition of the Chicago Women's Club, the Alumni Association and Illini of the University, numbering 5[,]000 students, which endorsed so powerful a candidate as Mrs. Emmons Blaine."

During her campaign, she said:

I know the faculty does not want me on the board. My endorsement consists chiefly of the votes of the people which have given me the biggest majorities ever attained by a political candidate in Illinois. I think I am the woman for the position because of unique financial training. I was owner and director of the street railway system of Belleville after the death of my first husband, Dr. Alexander. I took in money by the nickels and spent it by the thousands.

Alexander-Bahrenberg lost the election.

=== Other ===
She spoke at the 44th anniversary of the Illinois Equal Suffrage Association in October 1912 in Galesburg, Illinois. She said that suffrage could not be won by a national political party because it was strictly a matter for the states to decide.

Mrs. Bahrenberg was a member of the Equal Suffrage Society of Moline, Illinois, in October 1912.

She was a delegate to a convention of the National American Woman's Suffrage Association in 1913.

A leader in the Illinois division of the Woman's Relief Corps, the auxiliary of the Grand Army of the Republic veterans' organization, she was elected national secretary of the corps in 1915. The other candidates were Isabel Worrell Ball of Washington, D.C., Lois Knauff of Ohio and Lue Steward Wardworth of Massachusetts.
