= Delhi, Illinois =

Delhi
- Unincorporated community
- Location of Delhi within Illinois Delhi (the United States)
- Coordinates: 39°02′43″N 90°15′21″W
- Country: United States
- State: Illinois
- County: Jersey
- Township: Mississippi
- Elevation: 600 ft (180 m)
- Time zone: UTC-6 (CST)
  - Summer (DST): UTC-5 (CDT)
- Area code: 618
- GNIS feature ID: 407106

Delhi (/ˈdɛl.haɪ/) is an unincorporated community in Jersey County, Illinois, United States. It is located about five miles southeast of Jerseyville and about seven miles northwest of Godfrey along US Highway 67.

== History ==
Delhi was originally called Lurton's, and under the latter name was founded by the Lurton family, and named for them. A post office was established at Lurton's in 1833, and the post office was renamed Delhi in 1836.

== Education ==
Delhi was served by the public K-12 Jersey Community Unit School District 100. District schools in Delhi included Delhi Elementary School. The school was closed in June 2012 due to district realignment.

== Notable people ==
- Carrie Thomas Alexander-Bahrenberg, operated a street railway system
