= Ruyle Township, Jersey County, Illinois =

Ruyle Township
- Township
- Location in Jersey County

- Jersey County's location in Illinois
- Coordinates: 39°12′42″N 90°11′33″W
- Country: United States
- State: Illinois
- County: Jersey
- Established: November 5, 1878

Area
  - Total: 28.19 sq mi (73.0 km^{2})
  - Land: 28.18 sq mi (73.0 km^{2})
  - Water: 0.01 sq mi (0.026 km^{2}) 0.04%
- Elevation: 535 ft (163 m)

Population (2020)
  - Total: 395
  - Density: 14.0/sq mi (5.41/km^{2})
- Time zone: UTC-6 (CST)
  - Summer (DST): UTC-5 (CDT)
- ZIP codes: 62052, 62054, 62063
- FIPS code: 17-083-66482

Ruyle Township is one of eleven townships in Jersey County, Illinois, United States. As of the 2020 census, its population was 395 and it contained 157 housing units.

== Geography ==
According to the 2021 census gazetteer files, Ruyle Township has a total area of 28.19 square miles (73.01 km^{2}), of which 28.18 square miles (72.99 km^{2}) (or 99.96%) is land and 0.01 square miles (0.03 km^{2}) (or 0.04%) is water.

=== Unincorporated towns ===
- Kemper

=== Adjacent townships ===
- Rockbridge Township, Greene County (north)
- Western Mound Township, Macoupin County (northeast)
- Chesterfield Township, Macoupin County (east)
- Shipman Township, Macoupin County (southeast)
- Fidelity Township (south)
- Jersey Township (southwest)

=== Cemeteries ===
The township contains these five cemeteries: Elliott, Kemper, Medora, Oakland and Pruitt.

=== Major highways ===
- Illinois Route 267

== Demographics ==
As of the 2020 census there were 395 people, 125 households, and 87 families residing in the township. The population density was 14.01 inhabitants per square mile (5.41/km^{2}). There were 157 housing units at an average density of 5.57 per square mile (2.15/km^{2}). The racial makeup of the township was 94.68% White, 0.00% African American, 0.51% Native American, 0.00% Asian, 0.00% Pacific Islander, 0.76% from other races, and 4.05% from two or more races. Hispanic or Latino of any race were 1.01% of the population.

There were 125 households, out of which 32.80% had children under the age of 18 living with them, 60.80% were married couples living together, none had a female householder with no spouse present, and 30.40% were non-families. 16.80% of all households were made up of individuals, and none had someone living alone who was 65 years of age or older. The average household size was 2.18 and the average family size was 2.53.

The township's age distribution consisted of 14.3% under the age of 18, 0.0% from 18 to 24, 37% from 25 to 44, 37.3% from 45 to 64, and 11.4% who were 65 years of age or older. The median age was 43.8 years. For every 100 females, there were 145.9 males. For every 100 females age 18 and over, there were 134.0 males.

The median income for a household in the township was $109,276. Males had a median income of $79,737 versus $27,155 for females. The per capita income for the township was $56,263. No families and 11.7% of the population were below the poverty line, including none of those under age 18 or age 65 and over.

Historical population
Census	Pop.	Note	%±
2000	316		—
2010	421		33.2%
2020	395		−6.2%
U.S. Decennial Census

== School districts ==
- Greenfield Community Unit School District 10
- Jersey Community Unit School District 100
- Southwestern Community Unit School District 9

== Political districts ==
- Illinois's 19th congressional district
- State House District 97
- State Senate District 49

== See also ==
- Doc Bennett
