= Rosedale, Illinois =

Rosedale
- Unincorporated community
- Location of Rosedale within Illinois Rosedale (the United States)
- Coordinates: 39°02′39″N 90°32′53″W
- Country: United States
- State: Illinois
- County: Jersey
- Township: Rosedale
- Elevation: 456 ft (139 m)
- Time zone: UTC-6 (CST)
  - Summer (DST): UTC-5 (CDT)
- Area code: 618

Rosedale is an unincorporated community in Jersey County, Illinois, United States. It is located south of Fieldon and is just north of Pere Marquette State Park.
