= Otter Creek Township, Jersey County, Illinois =

Otter Creek Township
- Township
- Location in Jersey County

- Jersey County's location in Illinois
- Coordinates: 39°02′35″N 90°25′43″W
- Country: United States
- State: Illinois
- County: Jersey
- Established: November 5, 1878

Area
  - Total: 36.60 sq mi (94.8 km^{2})
  - Land: 36.48 sq mi (94.5 km^{2})
  - Water: 0.12 sq mi (0.31 km^{2}) 0.31%
- Elevation: 490 ft (150 m)

Population (2020)
  - Total: 899
  - Density: 24.6/sq mi (9.51/km^{2})
- Time zone: UTC-6 (CST)
  - Summer (DST): UTC-5 (CDT)
- ZIP codes: 62031, 62037, 62052
- FIPS code: 17-083-56952

Otter Creek Township is one of eleven townships in Jersey County, Illinois, United States. As of the 2020 census, its population was 899 and it contained 418 housing units.

== Geography ==
According to the 2021 census gazetteer files, Otter Creek Township has a total area of 36.60 square miles (94.79 km^{2}), of which 36.48 square miles (94.48 km^{2}) (or 99.69%) is land and 0.12 square miles (0.31 km^{2}) (or 0.31%) is water.

=== Cities, towns, villages ===
- Otterville

=== Adjacent townships ===
- English Township (north)
- Jersey Township (northeast)
- Mississippi Township (east)
- Elsah Township (southeast)
- Quarry Township (southwest)
- Rosedale Township (west)
- Richwood Township (northwest)

=== Cemeteries ===
The township contains these eleven cemeteries: Dabbs, Davenport, Dougherty, Edsall, Hamilton, Hinson, Lewis, McDowell, Noble Family, Salem and White.

=== Landmarks ===
- Pere Marquette State Park (northeastern portion)

== Demographics ==
As of the 2020 census there were 899 people, 417 households, and 274 families residing in the township. The population density was 24.57 inhabitants per square mile (9.49/km^{2}). There were 418 housing units at an average density of 11.42 per square mile (4.41/km^{2}). The racial makeup of the township was 93.99% White, 0.11% African American, 0.00% Native American, 0.33% Asian, 0.00% Pacific Islander, 0.44% from other races, and 5.12% from two or more races. Hispanic or Latino of any race were 1.56% of the population.

There were 417 households, out of which 25.20% had children under the age of 18 living with them, 61.63% were married couples living together, 4.08% had a female householder with no spouse present, and 34.29% were non-families. 32.90% of all households were made up of individuals, and 17.00% had someone living alone who was 65 years of age or older. The average household size was 2.33 and the average family size was 2.98.

The township's age distribution consisted of 21.0% under the age of 18, 3.2% from 18 to 24, 17.9% from 25 to 44, 30.8% from 45 to 64, and 27.0% who were 65 years of age or older. The median age was 52.3 years. For every 100 females, there were 137.4 males. For every 100 females age 18 and over, there were 139.7 males.

The median income for a household in the township was $49,219, and the median income for a family was $75,833. Males had a median income of $51,833 versus $34,079 for females. The per capita income for the township was $28,267. About 6.9% of families and 15.8% of the population were below the poverty line, including 16.6% of those under age 18 and 16.4% of those age 65 or over.

Historical population
Census	Pop.	Note	%±
2000	970		—
2010	1,035		6.7%
2020	899		−13.1%
U.S. Decennial Census

== School districts ==
- Jersey Community Unit School District 100

== Political districts ==
- Illinois' 17th congressional district
- State House District 97
- State Senate District 49
