= Adultery (disambiguation) =

Adultery is a form of extramarital sex.

Adultery may also refer to:

- Adultery (Do-Re-Mi album)
- Adultery (Dog Fashion Disco album)
- Adultery (1945 film), a 1945 Mexican film
- Adultery (1989 film), a 1989 South Korean film
- Adultery (novel), a 2014 novel by Paulo Coelho

== See also ==
- The Adulteress (disambiguation)
