= Fidelity Building =

Fidelity Building may refer to:

- Fidelity Building (Baltimore), a skyscraper in Baltimore, Maryland
- Fidelity Building (Benton Harbor, Michigan), an office building listed on the U.S. National Register of Historic Places (NRHP)
- Fidelity Building (Knoxville), an NRHP-listed office building in Knoxville, Tennessee

== See also ==
- Fidelity Trust Building, Buffalo, New York
- Fidelity Trust Building (Indianapolis, Indiana), NRHP-listed
- The Fidelity National Bank and Trust Company Building, Kansas City, Missouri, NRHP-listed
- Fidelity National Building, Oklahoma City, Oklahoma, listed on the NRHP in Oklahoma County, Oklahoma
- Fidelity Mutual Life Insurance Company Building, or Perelman Building, Philadelphia, Pennsylvania, NRHP-listed
- Fidelity-Philadelphia Trust Company Building, or Wells Fargo Building, Philadelphia, Pennsylvania, NRHP-listed
