= Lockhaven, Illinois =

Lockhaven
- Unincorporated community
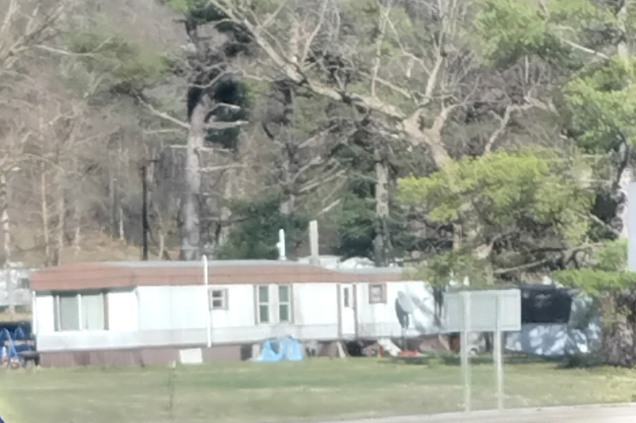
- Lockhaven in 2025

- Location of Lockhaven within Illinois Lockhaven (the United States)
- Coordinates: 38°56′26″N 90°17′17″W
- Country: United States
- State: Illinois
- County: Jersey
- Township: Elsah
- Elevation: 427 ft (130 m)
- Time zone: UTC-6 (CST)
  - Summer (DST): UTC-5 (CDT)
- Area code: 618

Lockhaven is an unincorporated community in Jersey County, Illinois, United States. It is located along Illinois Route 100, about seven miles (11 km) northwest of Alton.
