= Newbern, Illinois =

Newbern
- Unincorporated community
- Location of Newbern within Illinois Newbern (the United States)
- Coordinates: 39°00′25″N 90°20′13″W
- Country: United States
- State: Illinois
- County: Jersey
- Township: Mississippi
- Elevation: 650 ft (200 m)
- Time zone: UTC-6 (CST)
  - Summer (DST): UTC-5 (CDT)
- Area code: 618
- GNIS feature ID: 414479

Newbern is an unincorporated community in Jersey County, Illinois, United States. Newbern is 0.5 miles (0.80 km) south of Dow and 4 miles (6.4 km) north-northeast of Elsah.
