= Beltrees, Illinois =

Beltrees
- Unincorporated
- Location of Beltrees within Illinois Beltrees (the United States)
- Coordinates: 38°57′34″N 90°19′32″W
- Country: United States
- State: Illinois
- County: Jersey
- Township: Elsah
- Elevation: 453 ft (138 m)
- Time zone: UTC-6 (CST)
  - Summer (DST): UTC-5 (CDT)
- Area code: 618
- GNIS feature ID: 422456

Beltrees is an unincorporated community in southern Jersey County, Illinois, United States. Beltrees is 2 miles (3.2 km) east-northeast of Elsah.
