= Chautauqua, Illinois =

Private semi-gated summer resort in Elsah Township, Illinois

Chautauqua
- Unincorporated community
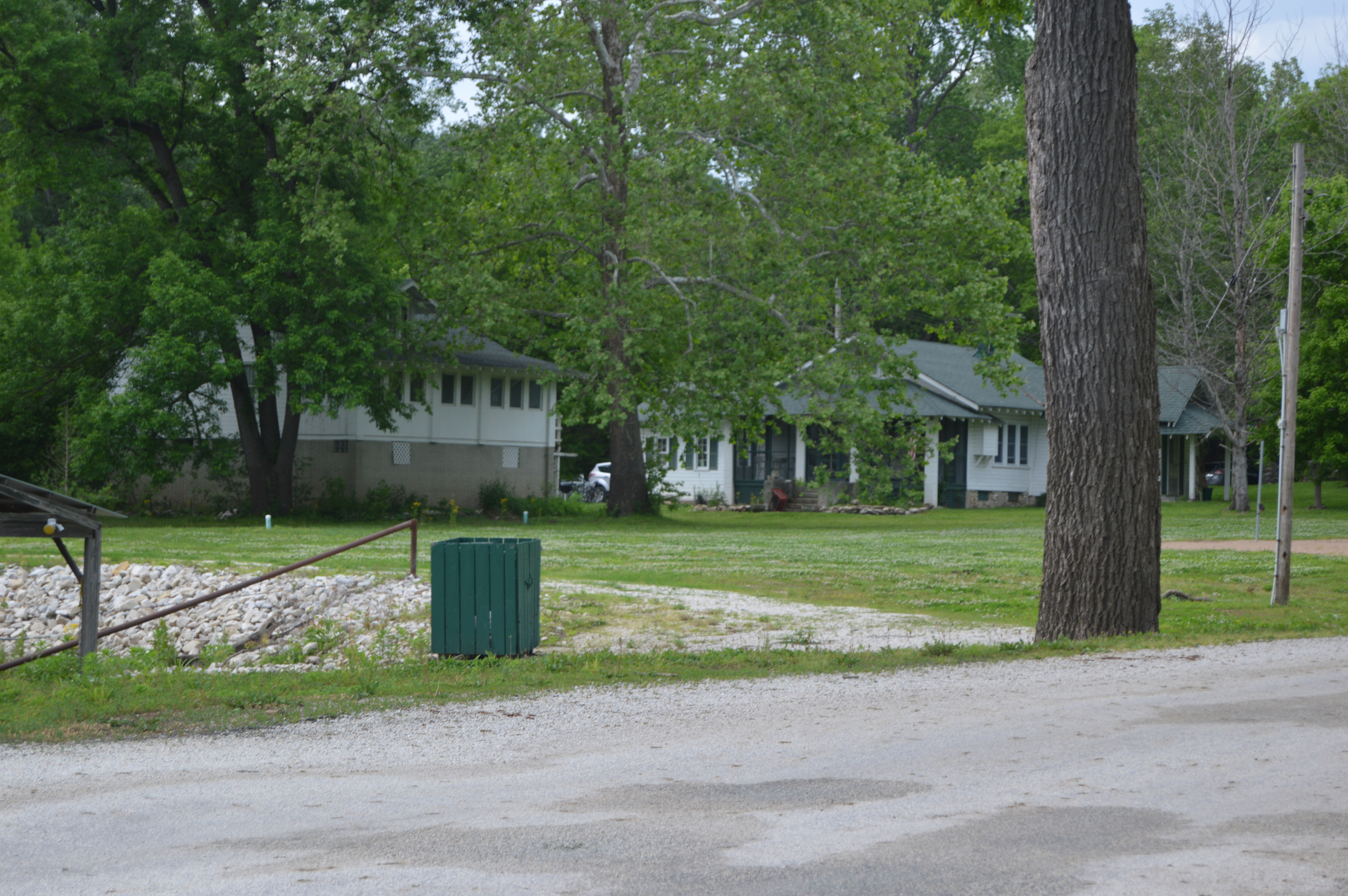
- Cottages near the entrance

- Location of Chautauqua within Illinois Chautauqua (the United States)
- Coordinates: 38°57′52″N 90°23′08″W
- Country: United States
- State: Illinois
- County: Jersey
- Township: Elsah
- Founded: 1885
- Elevation: 436 ft (133 m)
- Time zone: UTC-6 (CST)
  - Summer (DST): UTC-5 (CDT)
- Postal code: 62028
- Area code: 618
- GNIS feature ID: 428371

Chautauqua is a populated place in Jersey County, Illinois. Also known as the New Piasa Chautauqua Historic District which is a private semi-gated summer resort that started as a 19th-century tent settlement. The name Piasa is taken from a nearby Native American painting of a mythical bird, called the Piasa Bird, which was painted on the bluffs high above the Mississippi River. Chautauqua is located between Elsah and Grafton in Jersey County. Today, it is bordered by and has access from the Great River Road (Illinois Route 100). It has functioned as a private non-denominational Christian summer resort for over a century.

== History ==
Founded in 1885 by Methodist leaders, Piasa Chautauqua attracted thousands of people from the St. Louis area and other places in Illinois. Arriving first by packet boat, and later by automobile or the trains that ran by as often as six times a day, the vacationers were entertained, educated, and inspired by guests including William Jennings Bryan, evangelists Sam Jones, Billy Sunday and Gypsy Smith, the Swiss Bell Ringers, John Philip Sousa’s band and "Sunny Jim," reputed to be one of the Theodore Roosevelt’s Rough Riders.

The physical situation of the settlement added to its appeal as the hottest summer days had cool valley breezes and some evenings might require a jacket. Before the days of air-conditioning, this offered a welcome relief from the heat of the city. An early swimming pool, that used to be filled with cold spring water, remains a popular attraction.

A 1912 brochure described the area:

"Piasa Chautauqua is located less than 40 miles from St. Louis in a beautiful valley between high, massive bluffs with the great Mississippi serving as a guard in front and almost unexplored forest at back, one of nature’s most picturesque spots, unknown to thousands but dear to those who have enjoyed its beauties and regained health from its wonderful springs and its clear, pure air, delightful cool nights, beautiful scenery and outdoor amusements, boating, swimming, fishing, bathing, lawn tennis, croquet, baseball..."

In an Illinois tourists' guide in 1932, the author celebrates the region's "grandeur... [surpassing] that of the Palisades on the Hudson."

The New Piasa Chautauqua Historical Society, founded in 1983, is working to integrate the Chautauqua history with that of the surrounding area. It has been designated as the New Piasa Chautauqua Historic District, which was added to the National Register of Historic Places in 1982.

Today, there are over two hundred cottages and substantial homes at Chautauqua. Many are occupied by the descendants of earlier owners.
