= Spankey, Illinois =

Spankey
- Unincorporated community
- Location of Spankey within Illinois Spankey (the United States)
- Coordinates: 39°11′20″N 90°33′02″W
- Country: United States
- State: Illinois
- County: Jersey
- Township: Richwood
- Elevation: 436 ft (133 m)
- Time zone: UTC-6 (CST)
  - Summer (DST): UTC-5 (CDT)
- Area code: 618
- GNIS feature ID: 423194

Spankey (also Clendenin) is an unincorporated community in Jersey County, Illinois, United States. It is located about two miles east of the Illinois River.
