= Kemper, Illinois =

Kemper
- Unincorporated community
- Location of Kemper within Illinois Kemper (the United States)
- Coordinates: 39°12′58″N 90°09′52″W
- Country: United States
- State: Illinois
- County: Jersey
- Township: Ruyle
- Elevation: 545 ft (166 m)
- Time zone: UTC-6 (CST)
  - Summer (DST): UTC-5 (CDT)
- Area code: 618
- GNIS feature ID: 422866

Kemper (also Palmer's Prairie) is an unincorporated community in Jersey County, Illinois, United States. It is located on Illinois Route 267, northwest of Medora and south of Rockbridge.
