= Fidelity Township, Jersey County, Illinois =

Fidelity Township
- Township
- Location in Jersey County

- Jersey County's location in Illinois
- Coordinates: 39°08′09″N 90°11′39″W
- Country: United States
- State: Illinois
- County: Jersey
- Established: November 5, 1878

Area
  - Total: 36.18 sq mi (93.7 km^{2})
  - Land: 36.12 sq mi (93.6 km^{2})
  - Water: 0.07 sq mi (0.18 km^{2}) 0.19%
- Elevation: 604 ft (184 m)

Population (2020)
  - Total: 651
  - Density: 18.0/sq mi (6.96/km^{2})
- Time zone: UTC-6 (CST)
  - Summer (DST): UTC-5 (CDT)
- ZIP codes: 62012, 62030, 62052, 62063, 62079
- FIPS code: 17-083-25973

Fidelity Township is one of eleven townships in Jersey County, Illinois, United States. As of the 2020 census, its population was 651 and it contained 292 housing units.

== Geography ==
According to the 2021 census gazetteer files, Fidelity Township has a total area of 36.18 square miles (93.71 km^{2}), of which 36.12 square miles (93.55 km^{2}) (or 99.81%) is land and 0.07 square miles (0.18 km^{2}) (or 0.19%) is water.

=== Cities, towns, villages ===
- Fidelity

=== Extinct towns ===
- Bowman

=== Adjacent townships ===
- Ruyle Township (north)
- Chesterfield Township, Macoupin County (northeast)
- Shipman Township, Macoupin County (east)
- Brighton Township, Macoupin County (southeast)
- Piasa Township (south)
- Mississippi Township (southwest)
- Jersey Township (west)

=== Cemeteries ===
The township contains these five cemeteries: Chapman, Longwill, Luckey-Weber, Moore and Trible.

=== Major highways ===
- Illinois Route 16

== Demographics ==
As of the 2020 census there were 651 people, 309 households, and 241 families residing in the township. The population density was 17.99 inhabitants per square mile (6.95/km^{2}). There were 292 housing units at an average density of 8.07 per square mile (3.12/km^{2}). The racial makeup of the township was 95.08% White, 0.00% African American, 0.31% Native American, 0.46% Asian, 0.00% Pacific Islander, 0.46% from other races, and 3.69% from two or more races. Hispanic or Latino of any race were 0.92% of the population.

There were 309 households, out of which 53.40% had children under the age of 18 living with them, 57.93% were married couples living together, 20.06% had a female householder with no spouse present, and 22.01% were non-families. 16.50% of all households were made up of individuals, and 12.30% had someone living alone who was 65 years of age or older. The average household size was 2.89 and the average family size was 3.24.

The township's age distribution consisted of 29.0% under the age of 18, 12.9% from 18 to 24, 23.4% from 25 to 44, 26.1% from 45 to 64, and 8.8% who were 65 years of age or older. The median age was 32.2 years. For every 100 females, there were 75.0 males. For every 100 females age 18 and over, there were 72.1 males.

The median income for a household in the township was $41,685, and the median income for a family was $47,841. Males had a median income of $34,712 versus $18,512 for females. The per capita income for the township was $23,324. About 16.2% of families and 14.3% of the population were below the poverty line, including 23.3% of those under age 18 and 0.0% of those age 65 or over.

Historical population
Census	Pop.	Note	%±
2000	713		—
2010	715		0.3%
2020	651		−9.0%
U.S. Decennial Census

== School districts ==
- Jersey Community Unit School District 100
- Southwestern Community Unit School District 9

== Political districts ==
- Illinois' 19th congressional district
- State House District 97
- State Senate District 49
