= The Adulteress =

The Adulteress may refer to:

- The Adulteress (1946 film), a 1946 Italian film
- The Adulteress (1963 film), a 1963 film starring Peter Yang
- The Adulteress (1973 film), a 1973 film directed by Norbert Meisel
- The Adultress, a song from the album Pretenders II by The Pretenders

== See also ==
- Adultery (disambiguation)
