= McClusky, Illinois =

McClusky
- Unincorporated community
- Location of McClusky within Illinois McClusky (the United States)
- Coordinates: 39.043°N 90.32°W
- Country: United States
- State: Illinois
- County: Jersey
- Township: Mississippi
- Elevation: 636 ft (194 m)
- Time zone: UTC-6 (CST)
  - Summer (DST): UTC-5 (CDT)
- Postal code: 62052
- Area code: 618

McClusky is an unincorporated community in Jersey County, Illinois, United States. It is located along Illinois Route 109, south of Jerseyville.

== Notable person ==
- Larry Chappell - professional baseball player for the Chicago White Sox, Cleveland Indians and Boston Braves
