= Mississippi River State Fish and Wildlife Area =

State park in Illinois, USA

- IUCN category IV (habitat/species management area)
- Location within Illinois Location within the United States
- Location: Jersey and Calhoun counties, Illinois, United States
- Nearest city: Grafton, Illinois
- Coordinates: 39°5′N 90°30′W
- Area: 24,386 acres (98.69 km^{2})
- Governing body: Illinois Department of Natural Resources

Mississippi River State Fish and Wildlife Area is an 24,386-acre (9,869 ha) protected area in Jersey and Calhoun Counties, Illinois. The park is maintained by the Illinois Department of Natural Resources.
