= East Newbern, Illinois =

East Newbern
- Unincorporated community
- Location of East Newbern within Illinois East Newbern (the United States)
- Coordinates: 39°00′52″N 90°18′48″W
- Country: United States
- State: Illinois
- County: Jersey
- Township: Mississippi
- Elevation: 630 ft (190 m)
- Time zone: UTC-6 (CST)
  - Summer (DST): UTC-5 (CDT)
- Area code: 618
- GNIS feature ID: 422652

East Newbern is an unincorporated community in Jersey County, Illinois, United States. East Newbern is 5 miles (8.0 km) northeast of Elsah.
