= Fidelity (art and symbolism) =

Fidelity when personified in Western art stands for the secular aspect of Faith, or the trust that exists between a master and servant, or in family relationships. Fidelity is often represented as a woman, shown holding a golden seal and a key, but may also be represented by a dog. Fidelity may be shown alone, or may be accompanied by a dog, a symbol of not only faithfulness but also fidelity. In the Renaissance, Penelope or Griselda might also stand for fidelity. Fidelity is not in the usual lists of the seven virtues, though it may sometimes be included in such groupings. The plant myrtle (Myrtus) has been associated with fidelity, and hence used in weddings, from Roman times to the present, and wreathed crowns of myrtle may be found in art.

== Fidelity in allegory ==
A dog, when included in an allegorical painting, portrays the attribute of fidelity personified. The deep origins of this can also be recognized in the generic name Fido given to dogs, which originated from the Latin word fidus, meaning "trust." The story of the faithful dog of Titus Labienus, that would not quit his master's corpse, recorded in Pliny's Natural History book viii, was briefly recounted in Cesare Ripa's Iconologia (1593, etc.) in the explanation of the emblem of Fedeltà represented as a woman holding a ring and accompanied by a white dog.

== Fidelity in portraiture ==
When in a portrait of a married couple, a dog placed in a woman's lap or at her feet can represent marital fidelity. When the portrait is of a widow, a dog can represent her continuing faithfulness to the memory of her late husband. An example of a dog representing marital fidelity is present in Jan van Eyck's "Arnolfini Portrait."

== Fidelity and Death ==
During the Middle Ages, images of dogs were often carved on tombstones to represent the deceased's feudal loyalty or marital fidelity. The crusader lying in full armor on his tomb-chest, with a dog beneath his feet is a familiar trope.
