= USS Fidelity =

USS Fidelity is the name of two vessels of the U.S. Navy:

- USS Fidelity (AM-96) laid down 15 October 1941 by the Nashville Bridge Co., Nashville, Tennessee.
- USS Fidelity (AM-443) launched 21 August 1953 by Higgins Industries, Inc., New Orleans, Louisiana.
