= Fidelity, Illinois =

Fidelity
- Village
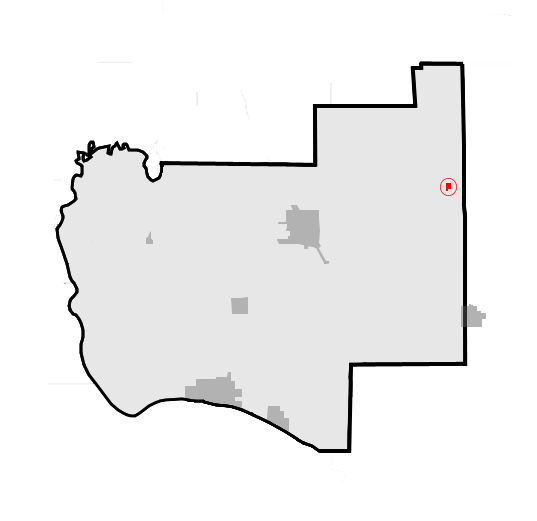
- Location of Fidelity within Jersey County, Illinois

- Location of Fidelity in Jersey County, Illinois.
- Coordinates: 39°09′17″N 90°09′52″W
- Country: United States
- State: Illinois
- County: Jersey
- Township: Fidelity

Area
  - Total: 0.10 sq mi (0.26 km^{2})
  - Land: 0.10 sq mi (0.26 km^{2})
  - Water: 0 sq mi (0.00 km^{2})
- Elevation: 633 ft (193 m)

Population (2020)
  - Total: 96
  - Density: 947.6/sq mi (365.86/km^{2})
- Time zone: UTC-6 (CST)
  - Summer (DST): UTC-5 (CDT)
- Zip code: 62032
- Area code: 618
- FIPS code: 17-25960
- GNIS feature ID: 2398873

Fidelity is a village in Jersey County, Illinois, United States, located about thirty-five miles north of Saint Louis, Missouri. As of the 2020 census, the village had a total population of 96.

== History ==
In 1829, people from Tennessee reportedly traveled across this site. According to local legend, a horse belonging to settler Joseph Russell went lame, stranding Russell, who was offered a replacement horse by another settler, Samuel Simmons.

The legend continues that Russell replied, "That's true fidelity."

In another version of events, Joseph Russell and his brother William were traveling from Hawkins County, TN, to Missouri. They were looking for cheap, good land. They set up camp in present-day Fidelity. They hobbled their horses and went to sleep. When they woke, they found that William's horse had tried to escape and injured its foot. Stuck with only one horse, William said "Joseph, you take my horse to finish the trip and get back to East Tennessee, and I'll stay here and keep your horse with me until his foot gets well." William exclaimed "Well, that's what I call real fidelity!" William continued to St Louis, surveyed a tract of land, and went back to Tennessee. On July 31, 1849, William wrote to Joseph about his intentions to name the town " Fidelity."

Simmons built a log cabin there, and in 1850, Russell and his brother also settled in the area. The Russell brothers are credited with having ensured the town was officially named Fidelity. A post office was established in the village in 1854. During the mid-20th century, Fidelity was reportedly the site of "a small Army barracks, grain elevator, several doctors and dentists, a blacksmith shop and grocery stores."

Since then, Fidelity has become a tiny village made up mostly of small homes. The post office is now the only remaining business and its postmark has enjoyed some popularity for use on Valentine's Day greetings, with several hundred requests for cancellations received from addresses both in the United States and around the world each year.

== Geography ==
According to the 2021 census gazetteer files, Fidelity has a total area of 0.10 square miles (0.26 km^{2}), all land.

== Demographics ==
Historical population
Census	Pop.	Note	%±
1880	236		—
1900	222		—
1910	211		−5.0%
1920	155		−26.5%
1930	138		−11.0%
1940	146		5.8%
1950	157		7.5%
1960	125		−20.4%
1970	132		5.6%
1980	98		−25.8%
1990	66		−32.7%
2000	105		59.1%
2010	114		8.6%
2020	96		−15.8%
U.S. Decennial Census

As of the 2020 census there were 96 people, 55 households, and 45 families residing in the village. The population density was 950.50 inhabitants per square mile (366.99/km^{2}). There were 38 housing units at an average density of 376.24 per square mile (145.27/km^{2}). The racial makeup of the village was 92.71% White, 0.00% African American, 0.00% Native American, 0.00% Asian, 0.00% Pacific Islander, 2.08% from other races, and 5.21% from two or more races. Hispanic or Latino of any race were 3.13% of the population.

There were 55 households, out of which 29.1% had children under the age of 18 living with them, 56.36% were married couples living together, 25.45% had a female householder with no husband present, and 18.18% were non-families. 9.09% of all households were made up of individuals, and 5.45% had someone living alone who was 65 years of age or older. The average household size was 2.93 and the average family size was 3.13.

The village's age distribution consisted of 18.6% under the age of 18, 7.0% from 18 to 24, 13.4% from 25 to 44, 37.2% from 45 to 64, and 23.8% who were 65 years of age or older. The median age was 54.4 years. For every 100 females, there were 72.0 males. For every 100 females age 18 and over, there were 60.9 males.

The median income for a household in the village was $28,125, and the median income for a family was $38,594. Males had a median income of $6,750 versus $4,500 for females. The per capita income for the village was $12,623. None of the population was below the poverty line.
