= Godfrey Township, Madison County, Illinois =

Godfrey Township
- Township

- Location of Illinois in the United States
- Coordinates: 38°57′37″N 90°13′24″W
- Country: United States
- State: Illinois
- County: Madison
- Established: November 2, 1875

Area
  - Total: 36.64 sq mi (94.9 km^{2})
  - Land: 34.64 sq mi (89.7 km^{2})
  - Water: 2 sq mi (5.2 km^{2})
- Elevation: 604 ft (184 m)

Population (2010)
  - Estimate (2016): 17,733
  - Density: 519.1/sq mi (200.4/km^{2})
- Time zone: UTC-6 (CST)
  - Summer (DST): UTC-5 (CDT)
- FIPS code: 17-119-30107

Godfrey Township was a township located in Madison County, Illinois, in the United States. As of the 2010 census, its population was 17,982 and it contained 7,708 housing units. When the village of Godfrey, Illinois was organized in 1991, Godfrey Township became coterminous with the village. Prior to its dissolution, Godfrey Township was one of two coterminous townships in Madison County and one of seventeen coterminous townships statewide. In 2018, the voters of Godfrey Township voted to dissolve the township government, and on May 20, 2019, the township was dissolved.

== History ==
Godfrey Township was organized following Madison County's adoption of township government in 1875. Godfrey Township was named for Captain Benjamin Godfrey, an early settler and the township's largest landowner.

== Geography ==
According to the 2010 census, the township had a total area of 36.64 square miles (94.9 km^{2}), of which 34.64 square miles (89.7 km^{2}) (or 94.54%) was land and 2 square miles (5.2 km^{2}) (or 5.46%) was water.

== Demographics ==
Historical population
Census	Pop.	Note	%±
2016 (est.)	17,733
U.S. Decennial Census
