= Adultery (1989 film) =

- Hangul: 간통
- Hanja: 姦通
- RR: Gantong
- MR: Kant'ong
- Directed by: Park Yong-jun
- Written by: Park su-il
- Produced by: Kim Jeong-jo
- Starring: Bang Hee; Lee Moo-jung; Jeong In-cheol
- Cinematography: Hong Dong-hyeok
- Edited by: Hyeon Dae-won
- Music by: Lee Jong-shik
- Distributed by: Han Young Films Co., Ltd
- Release date: June 3, 1989
- Running time: 109 minutes
- Country: South Korea
- Language: Korean

Adultery (Korean: 간통) is a 1989 South Korean erotic drama film.

== Plot ==
Na-yeong is raped on vacation while her husband Myeong-ho is on a business trip. Sang-hyeon raped Na-yeong in a spirit of vengeance for his old girl that resembles Na-yeong, yet Na-yeong soon becomes obsessed and begins having an affair with her rapist Sang-hyeon. Meanwhile, Myeong-ho has an affair with his daughter's piano teacher and she becomes pregnant. Na young learns about this affair and tries to divorce Myeong-ho out of guilt, but after Myeong-ho apologized and her daughter Cho-rong appealed to her in tears, the two reconcile.

== Cast ==
From movie ending credits:

- Bang Hee:Na-yeong
- Lee Moo-jung:Yeong-ho
- Jeong In-cheol:Sang-hyeon
- Sim Eun-yeong:Ji-yeon
- Kwak Jung-hee:Hye-suk
- Gwon Yeong-jin:Hyeon-ju
- Jeon Suk:Mother
- Choe Sung-kwan:Father
- Park Mi-na:Prostitute
- Jang Ae-hui:Noble woman 1
- Kim Min-gyeong:Noble woman 2
- Lee Ju-ran:Noble woman 3
- Kim Un-ok:Housemaid
