= Fidelity Building (Benton Harbor, Michigan) =

- U.S. National Register of Historic Places
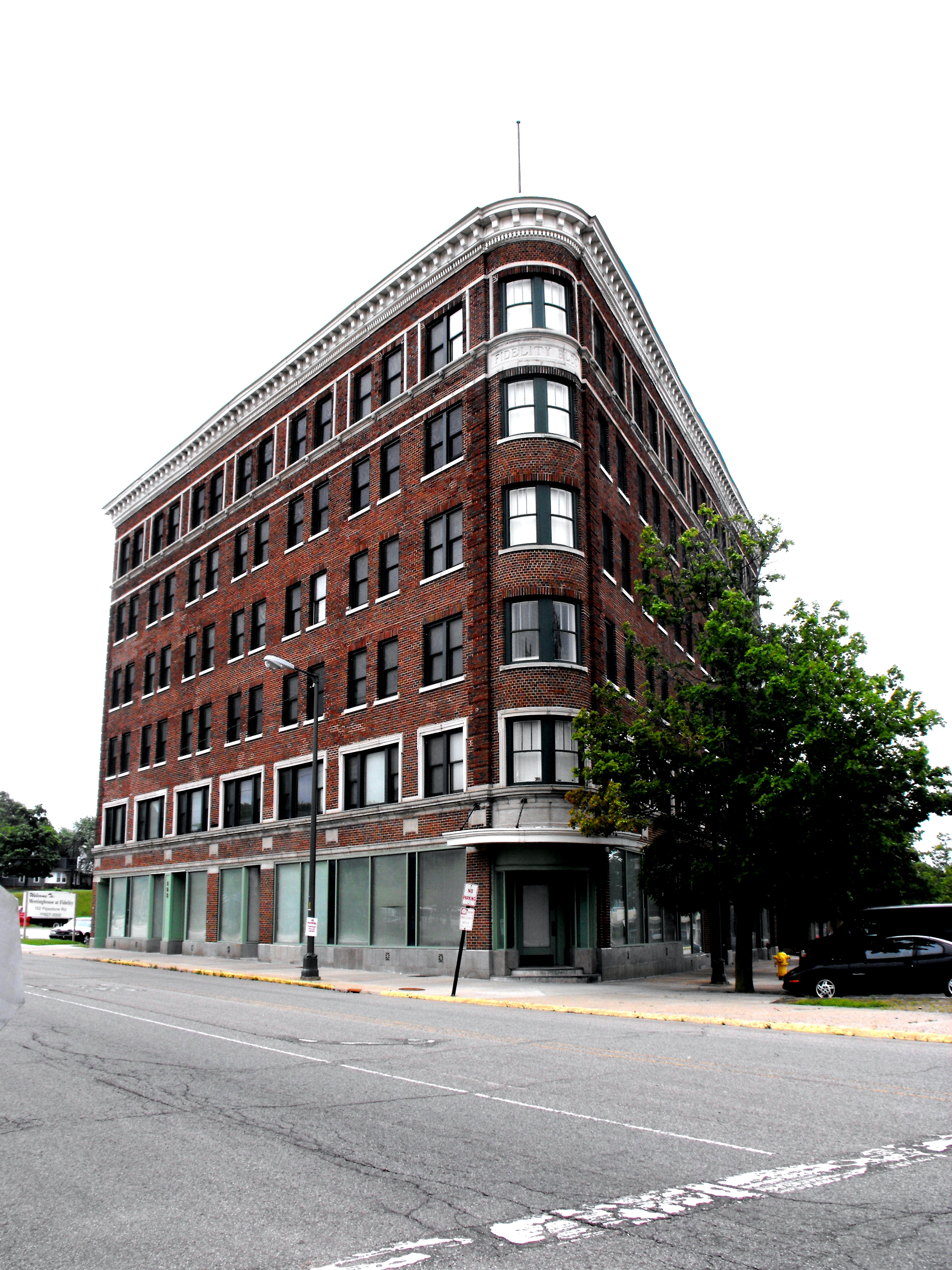

- Location within Michigan Location within the United States
- Interactive map
- Location: 162 Pipestone St., Benton Harbor, Michigan
- Coordinates: 42°6′52″N 86°27′15″W
- Area: less than one acre
- Built: 1926
- Architect: Charles W. Nichol
- Architectural style: Renaissance Revival
- NRHP reference No.: 02000042
- Added to NRHP: February 14, 2002

The Fidelity Building is an office building located at 162 Pipestone Street in Benton Harbor, Michigan. It was listed on the National Register of Historic Places in 2002. As of 2017, the building contains apartments known as the Meetinghouse at Fidelity.

== History ==
The Benton Harbor Development Company was organized in 1905 to entice business to establish in the city. The efforts of the organization brought a number of small manufacturers to Benton Harbor, and coupled with the upswing in tourism and the local fruit orchards, helped the city to prosperity in the first decades of the twentieth century. In 1926, the eight-story Hotel Vincent was constructed in downtown Benton Harbor. The next year, the Bradford-Bowlby Real Estate Company constructed a companion office building, the Fidelity Building.

Both the Vincent and the Fidelity Building were designed by architect Charles W. Nichol. The Fidelity was constructed by M.W. Stock & Sons Construction Company at a cost of $256,000. The adjacent streets were widened to accommodate the increased traffic, and other buildings were constructed nearby over the next few years. Early occupants of the building included the Fidelity Health & Accident Insurance Company (the namesake of the building) the Michigan Fruit Growers' Association, and the Chamber of Commerce.

However, beginning in the 1960s, downtown Benton Harbor languished, and businesses began closing or moving. The Fidelity Building was shuttered in 1976, and was passed from owner to owner. In 2002/03, the building was renovated into 31 apartments, and named the "Meetinghouse at Fidelity."

== Description ==
The Fidelity Building is a six-story Renaissance Revival reinforced concrete building with a brick veneer. It is roughly triangular in footprint, and has seven-bay-wide facades on both Pipestone and Michigan Streets. The facades merge in a curved corner portion at the intersection. The primary entrance to the upper floors is through a center entrance on Michigan Street; a secondary entrance is along Pipestone. The remainder of the street level facade contains a series of glass storefronts. Above, the second floor contains Chicago windows, with a large central pane flanked by narrow double hung windows. The upper floors have one-over-one double-hung windows. The facade is topped with a metal cornice.
