= New Delhi, Illinois =

New Delhi
- Unincorporated community
- Location of New Delhi within Illinois New Delhi (the United States)
- Coordinates: 39°01′54″N 90°15′40″W
- Country: United States
- State: Illinois
- County: Jersey
- Township: Mississippi
- Elevation: 584 ft (178 m)
- Time zone: UTC-6 (CST)
  - Summer (DST): UTC-5 (CDT)
- Postal code: 62052
- Area code: 618
- GNIS feature ID: 1747840

New Delhi is an unincorporated community in Jersey County, Illinois, United States. New Delhi is located along U.S. Route 67, 7 miles (11 km) south-southeast of Jerseyville.
