= Kane, Illinois =

- Village
- Location of Kane in Greene County, Illinois.
- Coordinates: 39°11′26″N 90°21′04″W
- Country: United States
- State: Illinois
- County: Greene
- Township: Kane

Area
  - Total: 0.54 sq mi (1.41 km^{2})
  - Land: 0.54 sq mi (1.41 km^{2})
  - Water: 0 sq mi (0.00 km^{2})
- Elevation: 561 ft (171 m)

Population (2020)
  - Total: 296
  - Density: 543.8/sq mi (209.97/km^{2})
- Time zone: UTC-6 (CST)
  - Summer (DST): UTC-5 (CDT)
- ZIP Code: 62054
- Area code: 217
- FIPS code: 17-38869
- GNIS feature ID: 2398324

Kane is a village in Greene County, Illinois, United States. The population was 296 at the 2020 census.

== Geography ==
Kane is located in southern Greene County. It is 9 miles (14 km) south of Carrollton, the county seat, and 6 miles (10 km) north of Jerseyville.

According to the 2021 census gazetteer files, Kane has a total area of 0.54 square miles (1.40 km^{2}), all land.

== Demographics ==
Historical population
Census	Pop.	Note	%±
1880	408		—
1890	551		35.0%
1900	588		6.7%
1910	521		−11.4%
1920	473		−9.2%
1930	511		8.0%
1940	490		−4.1%
1950	485		−1.0%
1960	469		−3.3%
1970	432		−7.9%
1980	445		3.0%
1990	456		2.5%
2000	459		0.7%
2010	438		−4.6%
2020	296		−32.4%
U.S. Decennial Census

As of the 2020 census there were 296 people, 98 households, and 53 families residing in the village. The population density was 544.12 inhabitants per square mile (210.09/km^{2}). There were 159 housing units at an average density of 292.28 per square mile (112.85/km^{2}). The racial makeup of the village was 92.57% White, 0.34% African American, 1.01% Native American, 0.34% Asian, 0.00% Pacific Islander, 0.00% from other races, and 5.74% from two or more races. Hispanic or Latino of any race were 0.68% of the population.

There were 98 households, out of which 20.4% had children under the age of 18 living with them, 30.61% were married couples living together, 13.27% had a female householder with no husband present, and 45.92% were non-families. 27.55% of all households were made up of individuals, and 15.31% had someone living alone who was 65 years of age or older. The average household size was 2.96 and the average family size was 2.49.

The village's age distribution consisted of 18.9% under the age of 18, 4.5% from 18 to 24, 27.8% from 25 to 44, 29.5% from 45 to 64, and 19.3% who were 65 years of age or older. The median age was 44.5 years. For every 100 females, there were 146.5 males. For every 100 females age 18 and over, there were 147.5 males.

The median income for a household in the village was $31,875, and the median income for a family was $41,406. Males had a median income of $26,563 versus $19,688 for females. The per capita income for the village was $16,731. About 9.4% of families and 23.0% of the population were below the poverty line, including 19.6% of those under age 18 and 4.3% of those age 65 or over.
