= Dow, Illinois =

Dow
- Unincorporated community
- Location of Dow within Illinois Dow (the United States)
- Coordinates: 39.013°N 90.342°W
- Country: United States
- State: Illinois
- County: Jersey
- Township: Mississippi
- Elevation: 673 ft (205 m)
- Time zone: UTC-6 (CST)
  - Summer (DST): UTC-5 (CDT)
- Postal code: 62022
- Area code: 618
- GNIS feature ID: 407362

Dow is an unincorporated community in Jersey County, Illinois, United States.

== History ==
Dow was laid out in 1883 when the railroad was extended to that point. The community derives its name from its founder, John McDow.

== Education ==
Dow was served by the public K-12 Jersey Community Unit School District 100. District schools in Dow included the Dow Elementary School. The school was closed in June 2011 due to district realignment.
