= Godfrey, Illinois =

- Village
- Flag Logo

- Location in Madison County, Illinois
- Coordinates: 38°57′31″N 90°14′30″W
- Country: United States
- State: Illinois
- County: Madison

Area
  - Total: 36.35 sq mi (94.15 km^{2})
  - Land: 34.39 sq mi (89.08 km^{2})
  - Water: 1.96 sq mi (5.07 km^{2})
- Elevation: 591 ft (180 m)

Population (2020)
  - Total: 17,825
  - Density: 518/sq mi (200.1/km^{2})
- Time zone: UTC-6 (CST)
  - Summer (DST): UTC-5 (CDT)
- ZIP code: 62035
- Area code: 618
- FIPS code: 17-30094
- GNIS feature ID: 2398984
- Website: www.godfreyil.org

Godfrey is a village in Madison County, Illinois, United States. The population was 17,825 at the 2020 census. Godfrey is located within the River Bend portion of the Greater St. Louis metropolitan area.

== History ==
The village is named for Captain Benjamin Godfrey, a native New Englander, who arrived in the area in 1832. 1838 saw the establishment of the Monticello Female Seminary, later renamed Monticello College. Captain Godfrey, the father of eight daughters, was an advocate of higher education for women and made a large donation of funds and land for the college. Monticello operated as a two-year college for women until the campus was sold in 1970 to establish Lewis and Clark Community College. Monticello's final class graduated in 1971.

The nearby mouth of the Missouri River was the starting point for the expedition of Lewis and Clark.

== Geography ==
Godfrey is located in the northwest corner of Madison County. It is bordered to the southeast by the city of Alton, to the east by Foster Township, to the north and west by Jersey County, and to the south by the Mississippi River, across which is the city of West Alton, Missouri. Godfrey is 32 miles (51 km) by road north of downtown St. Louis.

According to the 2021 census gazetteer files, Godfrey village has a total area of 36.35 square miles (94.15 km^{2}), of which 34.40 square miles (89.10 km^{2}) (or 94.61%) is land and 1.96 square miles (5.08 km^{2}) (or 5.39%) is water.

The southwestern edge of the village is a wall of 200-foot-high (60 m) limestone bluffs along the Mississippi River. Approximately 12 miles (19 km) upstream is the mouth of the Illinois River. The Missouri River empties into the Mississippi 10 miles (16 km) downstream. Godfrey retains the status of a village and is a mixture of small business, agriculture, and upper middle class housing developments.

Several highways cross the village. U.S. Route 67 passes through the village center, leading south into Alton and thence into Missouri, while to the north it leads 14 miles (23 km) to Jerseyville. Illinois Route 3 passes through the southern part of the village, leading southeast into the north part of Alton and west 17 miles (27 km) to Grafton. Illinois Route 100 follows the Mississippi River along the southern edge of the village, leading east into the center of Alton and west-northwest 12 miles (19 km) to Grafton. Illinois Route 267 splits off from US 67 north of the village center and leads northeast 6 miles (10 km) to Brighton. Finally, Illinois Route 255, a four-lane expressway, has its northern terminus at US 67 in Godfrey; it leads southeast 20 miles (32 km) to Interstates 255 and 270 in Pontoon Beach.

== Demographics ==
Historical population
Census	Pop.	Note	%±
1880	85		—
1890	228		168.2%
1990	15,660		—
2000	16,286		4.0%
2010	17,982		10.4%
2020	17,825		−0.9%
U.S. Decennial Census

As of the 2020 census there were 17,825 people, 7,713 households, and 5,183 families residing in the village. The population density was 490.33 inhabitants per square mile (189.32/km^{2}). There were 7,912 housing units at an average density of 217.64 per square mile (84.03/km^{2}), of which 6.2% were vacant. The homeowner vacancy rate was 2.3% and the rental vacancy rate was 6.6%. The racial makeup of the village was 87.37% White, 5.88% African American, 0.23% Native American, 0.84% Asian, 0.00% Pacific Islander, 0.74% from other races, and 4.94% from two or more races. Hispanic or Latino of any race were 2.38% of the population.

There were 7,713 households, out of which 23.4% had children under the age of 18 living with them, 55.98% were married couples living together, 7.83% had a female householder with no husband present, and 32.80% were non-families. 26.01% of all households were made up of individuals, and 14.53% had someone living alone who was 65 years of age or older. The average household size was 2.69 and the average family size was 2.24.

The village's age distribution consisted of 16.2% under the age of 18, 4.7% from 18 to 24, 20.2% from 25 to 44, 31.3% from 45 to 64, and 27.6% who were 65 years of age or older. The median age was 51.6 years. For every 100 females, there were 96.9 males. For every 100 females age 18 and over, there were 88.8 males.

The median income for a household in the village was $73,041, and the median income for a family was $91,916. Males had a median income of $53,197 versus $37,298 for females. The per capita income for the village was $39,991. About 4.7% of families and 6.6% of the population were below the poverty line, including 11.5% of those under age 18 and 2.3% of those age 65 or over.

83.2% of residents lived in urban areas, while 16.8% lived in rural areas.

Racial composition as of the 2020 census
Race	Number	Percent
White	15,574	87.4%
Black or African American	1,048	5.9%
American Indian and Alaska Native	41	0.2%
Asian	149	0.8%
Native Hawaiian and Other Pacific Islander	0	0.0%
Some other race	132	0.7%
Two or more races	881	4.9%
Hispanic or Latino (of any race)	424	2.4%

== Education ==
It is in the Alton Community Unit School District 11.

== Notable people ==
- Zoe Akins, Pulitzer Prize-winning poet and playwright; attended school in Godfrey
- Craig Hentrich, NFL punter, 1994–2009
- Bryan Hudson, MLB pitcher with the Chicago White Sox; born in Godfrey
- John Madson, freelance naturalist, tallgrass prairie ecosystems
- Ellis Wainwright, brewer, art collector and socialite
