= Kane Township, Greene County, Illinois =

Kane Township
- Township
- Location in Greene County

- Greene County's location in Illinois
- Coordinates: 39°12′43″N 90°23′12″W
- Country: United States
- State: Illinois
- County: Greene
- Established: November 4, 1884

Area
  - Total: 49.05 sq mi (127.0 km^{2})
  - Land: 49.02 sq mi (127.0 km^{2})
  - Water: 0.03 sq mi (0.078 km^{2}) 0.06%
- Elevation: 512 ft (156 m)

Population (2020)
  - Total: 758
  - Density: 15.5/sq mi (5.97/km^{2})
- Time zone: UTC-6 (CST)
  - Summer (DST): UTC-5 (CDT)
- ZIP codes: 62016, 62027, 62052, 62054, 62081
- FIPS code: 17-061-38882

Kane Township is one of thirteen townships in Greene County, Illinois, USA. As of the 2020 census, its population was 758 and it contained 373 housing units.

== Geography ==
According to the 2021 census gazetteer files, Kane Township has a total area of 49.05 square miles (127.04 km^{2}), of which 49.02 square miles (126.96 km^{2}) (or 99.94%) is land and 0.03 square miles (0.08 km^{2}) (or 0.06%) is water.

=== Cities, towns, villages ===
- Kane

=== Unincorporated towns ===
- Jalapa at 39.220602°N 90.324282°W
- Old Kane at 39.188936°N 90.372616°W

(This list is based on USGS data and may include former settlements.)

=== Extinct towns ===
- Conwayville at 39.236158°N 90.399284°W
- Mid City at 39.221991°N 90.391506°W

(These towns are listed as "historical" by the USGS.)

=== Cemeteries ===
The township contains these six cemeteries: Burch, Cannedy, Erwin, Kane, Parker and Thompson. and Mt Pisgah

=== Major highways ===
- U.S. Route 67

== Demographics ==
As of the 2020 census there were 758 people, 212 households, and 149 families residing in the township. The population density was 15.45 inhabitants per square mile (5.97/km^{2}). There were 373 housing units at an average density of 7.60 per square mile (2.93/km^{2}). The racial makeup of the township was 96.44% White, 0.13% African American, 0.53% Native American, 0.13% Asian, 0.00% Pacific Islander, 0.00% from other races, and 2.77% from two or more races. Hispanic or Latino of any race were 0.40% of the population.

There were 212 households, out of which 21.70% had children under the age of 18 living with them, 45.75% were married couples living together, 15.09% had a female householder with no spouse present, and 29.72% were non-families. 21.20% of all households were made up of individuals, and 12.30% had someone living alone who was 65 years of age or older. The average household size was 2.73 and the average family size was 3.13.

The township's age distribution consisted of 19.5% under the age of 18, 5.7% from 18 to 24, 17.4% from 25 to 44, 30.6% from 45 to 64, and 26.8% who were 65 years of age or older. The median age was 50.6 years. For every 100 females, there were 140.2 males. For every 100 females age 18 and over, there were 136.5 males.

The median income for a household in the township was $44,167, and the median income for a family was $56,125. Males had a median income of $45,357 versus $20,250 for females. The per capita income for the township was $21,573. About 5.4% of families and 13.5% of the population were below the poverty line, including 8.0% of those under age 18 and 8.4% of those age 65 or over.

Historical population
Census	Pop.	Note	%±
2000	1,104		—
2010	995		−9.9%
2020	758		−23.8%
U.S. Decennial Census

== School districts ==
- Carrollton Community Unit School District 1
- Greenfield Community Unit School District 10
- Jersey Community Unit School District 100

== Political districts ==
- Illinois' 19th congressional district
- State House District 97
- State Senate District 49
