= Jersey County, Illinois =

County in Illinois, United States

- County
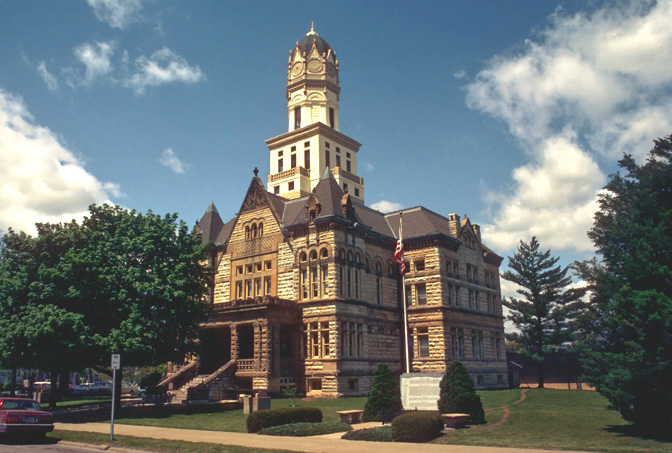
- Jersey County Courthouse in Jerseyville

- Location within the U.S. state of Illinois
- Coordinates: 39°05′N 90°22′W
- Country: United States
- State: Illinois
- Founded: February 28, 1839
- Named for: New Jersey
- Seat: Jerseyville
- Largest city: Jerseyville

Area
  - Total: 377 sq mi (980 km^{2})
  - Land: 369 sq mi (960 km^{2})
  - Water: 7.9 sq mi (20 km^{2}) 2.1%

Population (2020)
  - Total: 21,512
  - Estimate (2025): 21,160 ▼
  - Density: 58.3/sq mi (22.5/km^{2})
- Time zone: UTC−6 (Central)
  - Summer (DST): UTC−5 (CDT)
- Congressional district: 15th
- Website: jerseycounty-il.gov

Jersey County is a county located in the U.S. state of Illinois. At the 2020 census, it had a population of 21,512. The county seat and largest community is Jerseyville, with a population of 8,337 in 2010. The county's smallest incorporated community is Otterville, with a population of 87.

Jersey County is included in the St. Louis, MO-IL Metropolitan Statistical Area.

== History ==
Jersey County lies just northeast of where the great Mississippi and Illinois rivers meet. It is the former home of the Kickapoo, Menominee, Potawatomi, and Illiniwek Confederation Native Americans. The first European explorers to visit the area, Father Marquette and Louis Jolliet, arrived in 1673, where they encountered the fearsome painting of the Piasa bird. The present day Pere Marquette State Park, located near Grafton, is named in Father Marquette's honor, and a monument to him is located at the park.

Jersey County was founded on February 28, 1839, and was formed out of Greene County. The county was named for the state of New Jersey, from which many of the early settlers emigrated - which was itself named for the Channel Island of Jersey in Great Britain. The area quickly evolved into several small agricultural communities. As the area soon began to flourish, a county government was established and a courthouse was built in Jerseyville, the county seat. The Jersey County Courthouse was designed by architect Henry Elliott who also designed the courthouses in nearby Greene County, Edgar County, Illinois, DeWitt County, Illinois (later demolished in 1987) and Pike County, Illinois. The cornerstone for the courthouse was laid on July 4, 1893. The Romanesque Revival style courthouse is a magnificent architectural structure of limestone quarried from the nearby town of Grafton, Illinois.

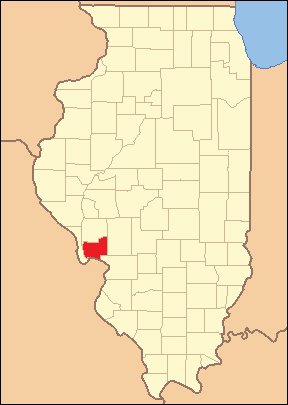
Jersey County at the time of its creation in 1839

=== Recent history ===
Today, while the county maintains its agricultural base, it is also within commuting distance of jobs and industry in St. Louis, Missouri and the surrounding area. A large portion of the population works outside of Jersey County and benefits from being "Near the crowd, but not in it.", the official slogan of the Jersey County Business Association's advertising campaign. The bordering rivers play an important part in Jersey County's economy by supporting agricultural producers and agribusiness, and by creating a strong tourist market. Education, manufacturing, and retail are also among the county's largest industries.

== Geography ==
According to the U.S. Census Bureau, the county has a total area of 377 square miles (980 km^{2}), of which 369 square miles (960 km^{2}) is land and 7.9 square miles (20 km^{2}) (2.1%) is water. Jersey County is bordered by three bodies of water: the Mississippi River to the south, the Illinois River to the west, and Macoupin Creek to the northwest.

=== Climate ===
Jerseyville, Illinois

Climate chart (precipitation, max. and min. temperature)
J	F	M	A	M	J	J	A	S	O	N	D
1.9 35 17	2 41 22	3.5 53 32	4.1 64 42	4 74 52	3.7 83 61	3.5 88 66	2.9 86 63	3.2 79 55	2.9 68 43	3.8 53 34	2.8 40 23
- █ Average max. and min. temperatures in °F
- █ Precipitation totals in inches
- Source: The Weather Channel
Metric conversion
J	F	M	A	M	J	J	A	S	O	N	D
49 2 −8	51 5 −6	89 12 0	105 18 6	100 23 11	93 28 16	89 31 19	74 30 17	82 26 13	73 20 6	96 12 1	72 4 −5
- █ Average max. and min. temperatures in °C
- █ Precipitation totals in mm

Typically, the county's climate reflects most Midwest areas, located in the transitional zone between the humid continental climate type and the humid subtropical climate type (Köppen Dfa and Cfa, respectively), with neither large mountains nor large bodies of water to moderate its temperature. Spring is the wettest season and produces severe weather ranging from tornadoes to snow or ice storms. Summers are hot and humid, and the humidity often makes the heat index rise to temperatures feeling well above 100 °F (38 °C). Fall is mild with lower humidity and can produce intermittent bouts of heavy rainfall with the first snow flurries usually forming in late November. Winters can be cold at times with periodic light snow and temperatures below freezing.

In recent years, average temperatures in Jerseyville have ranged from a low of 17 °F (−8 °C) in January to a high of 88 °F (31 °C) in July. The record low temperature of −25 °F (−32 °C) was recorded in January 1977 and the record high temperature of 112 °F (44 °C) was recorded in July 1954. Average monthly precipitation ranges from 1.92 inches (49 mm) in January to 4.14 inches (105 mm) in April.

=== Major highways ===
- U.S. Route 67
- Illinois Route 3
- Illinois Route 16
- Illinois Route 100
- Illinois Route 109
- Illinois Route 111
- Illinois Route 267

=== State protected areas ===
- Mississippi River State Fish and Wildlife Area
- Pere Marquette State Park

=== National protected areas ===
- Two Rivers National Wildlife Refuge (eastern portion)

== Demographics ==
Historical population
Census	Pop.	Note	%±
1840	4,535		—
1850	7,354		62.2%
1860	12,051		63.9%
1870	15,054		24.9%
1880	15,542		3.2%
1890	14,810		−4.7%
1900	14,612		−1.3%
1910	13,954		−4.5%
1920	12,682		−9.1%
1930	12,556		−1.0%
1940	13,636		8.6%
1950	15,264		11.9%
1960	17,023		11.5%
1970	18,492		8.6%
1980	20,538		11.1%
1990	20,539		0.0%
2000	21,668		5.5%
2010	22,985		6.1%
2020	21,512		−6.4%
2025 (est.)	21,160	▼	−1.6%
U.S. Decennial Census; 1790-1960 1900-1990; 1990-2000 2010-2013

2000 census age pyramid for Jersey County

=== 2020 census ===
As of the 2020 census, the county had a population of 21,512. The median age was 44.2 years. 20.5% of residents were under the age of 18 and 21.1% of residents were 65 years of age or older. For every 100 females there were 96.7 males, and for every 100 females age 18 and over there were 94.3 males age 18 and over.

The racial makeup of the county was 93.9% White, 0.7% Black or African American, 0.1% American Indian and Alaska Native, 0.4% Asian, <0.1% Native Hawaiian and Pacific Islander, 0.4% from some other race, and 4.5% from two or more races. Hispanic or Latino residents of any race comprised 1.5% of the population.

40.6% of residents lived in urban areas, while 59.4% lived in rural areas.

There were 8,652 households in the county, of which 27.5% had children under the age of 18 living in them. Of all households, 52.5% were married-couple households, 17.1% were households with a male householder and no spouse or partner present, and 24.3% were households with a female householder and no spouse or partner present. About 28.3% of all households were made up of individuals and 13.9% had someone living alone who was 65 years of age or older.

There were 9,754 housing units, of which 11.3% were vacant. Among occupied housing units, 78.1% were owner-occupied and 21.9% were renter-occupied. The homeowner vacancy rate was 2.1% and the rental vacancy rate was 7.9%.

=== Racial and ethnic composition ===
Jersey County County, Illinois – Racial and ethnic composition Note: the US Census treats Hispanic/Latino as an ethnic category. This table excludes Latinos from the racial categories and assigns them to a separate category. Hispanics/Latinos may be of any race.
Race / Ethnicity (NH = Non-Hispanic)	Pop 1980	Pop 1990	Pop 2000	Pop 2010	Pop 2020	% 1980	% 1990	% 2000	% 2010	% 2020
White alone (NH)	20,310	20,267	21,148	22,281	20,105	98.89%	98.68%	97.60%	96.94%	93.46%
Black or African American alone (NH)	62	94	113	89	156	0.30%	0.46%	0.52%	0.39%	0.73%
Native American or Alaska Native alone (NH)	33	40	38	52	21	0.16%	0.19%	0.18%	0.23%	0.10%
Asian alone (NH)	26	32	54	76	74	0.13%	0.16%	0.25%	0.33%	0.34%
Native Hawaiian or Pacific Islander alone (NH)	x	x	7	6	3	x	x	0.03%	0.03%	0.01%
Other race alone (NH)	9	3	6	11	32	0.04%	0.01%	0.03%	0.05%	0.15%
Mixed race or Multiracial (NH)	x	x	140	248	794	x	x	0.65%	1.08%	3.69%
Hispanic or Latino (any race)	98	103	162	222	327	0.48%	0.50%	0.75%	0.97%	1.52%
Total	20,538	20,539	21,668	22,985	21,512	100.00%	100.00%	100.00%	100.00%	100.00%

=== 2010 census ===
As of the 2010 United States census, there were 22,985 people, 8,828 households, and 6,228 families residing in the county. The population density was 62.2 inhabitants per square mile (24.0/km^{2}). There were 9,848 housing units at an average density of 26.7 per square mile (10.3/km^{2}). The racial makeup of the county was 97.6% white, 0.4% black or African American, 0.3% Asian, 0.3% American Indian, 0.2% from other races, and 1.2% from two or more races. Those of Hispanic or Latino origin made up 1.0% of the population. In terms of ancestry, 42.8% were German, 14.7% were Irish, 10.6% were English, and 8.6% were American.

Of the 8,828 households, 31.9% had children under the age of 18 living with them, 56.4% were married couples living together, 9.7% had a female householder with no husband present, 29.5% were non-families, and 25.0% of all households were made up of individuals. The average household size was 2.51 and the average family size was 2.98. The median age was 40.5 years.

The median income for a household in the county was $53,470 and the median income for a family was $64,773. Males had a median income of $48,750 versus $31,789 for females. The per capita income for the county was $24,368. About 5.6% of families and 8.5% of the population were below the poverty line, including 8.4% of those under age 18 and 7.1% of those age 65 or over.

== Communities ==
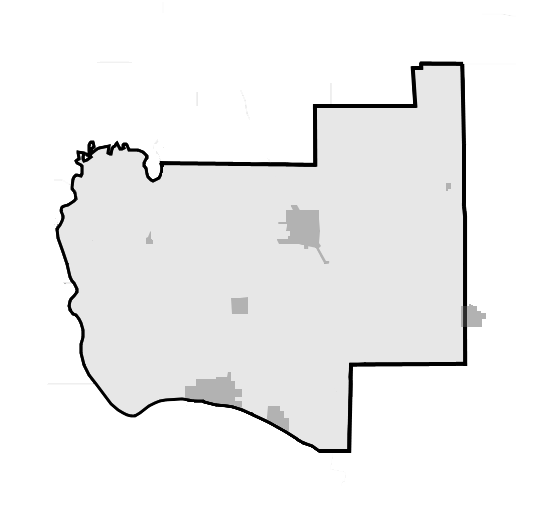
Incorporated communities in Jersey County

=== Cities ===
- Grafton
- Jerseyville

=== Villages ===
- Brighton
- Elsah
- Fidelity
- Fieldon

=== Town ===
- Otterville

=== Unincorporated communities ===
- Beltrees
- Chautauqua
- Delhi
- Dow
- East Newbern
- Kemper
- Lake Piasa
- Lockhaven
- McClusky
- Newbern
- New Delhi
- Nutwood
- Rosedale
- Spankey

=== Townships ===
Jersey County is divided into eleven townships:

- Elsah Township
- English Township
- Fidelity Township
- Jersey Township
- Mississippi Township
- Otter Creek Township
- Piasa Township
- Quarry Township
- Richwood Township
- Rosedale Township
- Ruyle Township

=== Population ranking ===
The population ranking of the following table is based on the 2020 census of Jersey County.

† county seat

Rank	Place	Municipal type	Population (2020 Census)
1	† Jerseyville	City	8,336
2	Brighton (partially in Macoupin County)	Village	2,221
3	Grafton	City	626
4	Elsah	Village	519
5	Fieldon	Village	176
6	Fidelity	Village	96
7	Otterville	Town	87

== Education ==
=== Unified school districts ===
- Alton Community Unit School District 11 - serves a very small portion of southern Jersey County (east of Elsah), along with northwestern Madison County.
- Greenfield Community Unit School District 10 - serves a very small portion of northeastern Jersey County (west of Kemper), along with eastern Greene County.
- Jersey Community Unit School District 100 - serves most of Jersey County, and a small portion of southern Greene County.
- Southwestern Community Unit School District 9 - serves the northeastern and southeastern portions of Jersey County, along with southwestern Macoupin County.

=== High schools ===
- Jersey Community High School, located in Jerseyville.

=== Colleges and universities ===
- Principia College, located near Elsah.

== Government ==
=== Local ===
Jersey County, Illinois
Position	Person	Party
County Board Chairman	Gary Krueger	Republican
County Board Majority	12-0	Republican
Circuit Clerk	Mitch Reynolds	Republican
County Clerk	Pam Warford	Republican
Coroner	Kevin Ayres	Republican
Sheriff	Nicholas Manns	Independent
State's Attorney	Benjamin L. Goetten	Independent
Regional Superintendent	Michelle Mueller	Democratic
Treasurer	Rebecca Strang	Republican

The Republican Party holds five of eight countywide elected positions as of 2022 as well as a 12 to zero majority on the county board.

Jersey County is part of Regional Office of Education #40 which includes neighboring Macoupin, Calhoun and Greene counties. The office operates a facility in Jerseyville.

=== State ===
Jersey County is divided into two legislative districts in the Illinois House of Representatives:

- District 100 - Currently represented by C. D. Davidsmeyer (R-Jacksonville) and consists of the majority of the county and includes the cities of Jerseyville and Grafton.
- District 111 - Currently represented by Amy Elik (R-Fosterburg) and consists of the southern portion of the county and includes the village of Elsah.

The county is also divided into two legislative districts in the Illinois Senate:

- District 50 - Currently represented by Steve McClure (R-Springfield) and consists of the majority of the county and includes the cities of Jerseyville and Grafton.
- District 56 - Currently represented by Kristopher Tharp (D-Wood River) and consists of the southern portion of the county and includes the village of Elsah.

As of February 2025, the county is one of 7 that voted to join the state of Indiana.

=== Federal ===
United States presidential election results for Jersey County, Illinois
Year	Republican		Democratic		Third party(ies)	
Year	No.	%	No.	%	No.	%
1892	1,314	37.37%	2,011	57.20%	191	5.43%
1896	1,641	40.22%	2,377	58.26%	62	1.52%
1900	1,496	40.08%	2,145	57.46%	92	2.46%
1904	1,531	45.30%	1,713	50.68%	136	4.02%
1908	1,460	43.17%	1,818	53.76%	104	3.08%
1912	838	29.33%	1,573	55.06%	446	15.61%
1916	2,644	45.34%	3,052	52.34%	135	2.32%
1920	2,873	57.90%	1,999	40.29%	90	1.81%
1924	2,460	44.44%	2,723	49.19%	353	6.38%
1928	2,993	54.62%	2,473	45.13%	14	0.26%
1932	2,157	35.54%	3,807	62.73%	105	1.73%
1936	3,023	42.81%	3,955	56.01%	83	1.18%
1940	3,958	51.44%	3,692	47.99%	44	0.57%
1944	3,546	54.67%	2,910	44.87%	30	0.46%
1948	3,021	49.21%	3,092	50.37%	26	0.42%
1952	4,031	54.03%	3,424	45.89%	6	0.08%
1956	4,220	55.24%	3,415	44.70%	5	0.07%
1960	4,247	50.90%	4,087	48.99%	9	0.11%
1964	3,041	43.59%	3,936	56.41%	0	0.00%
1968	3,806	46.81%	3,350	41.21%	974	11.98%
1972	5,164	60.70%	3,317	38.99%	26	0.31%
1976	4,273	47.57%	4,625	51.49%	85	0.95%
1980	5,266	58.61%	3,324	36.99%	395	4.40%
1984	5,146	57.60%	3,762	42.11%	26	0.29%
1988	4,343	49.62%	4,376	50.00%	33	0.38%
1992	2,933	29.06%	4,749	47.05%	2,411	23.89%
1996	3,211	36.63%	4,275	48.77%	1,280	14.60%
2000	4,699	49.92%	4,355	46.27%	359	3.81%
2004	5,435	53.62%	4,597	45.35%	105	1.04%
2008	5,329	50.20%	5,042	47.50%	244	2.30%
2012	6,039	60.38%	3,667	36.67%	295	2.95%
2016	7,748	70.49%	2,679	24.37%	564	5.13%
2020	8,712	72.84%	2,961	24.76%	287	2.40%
2024	8,684	73.95%	2,816	23.98%	243	2.07%

Jersey County's federal political history is fairly typical of "anti-Yankee" Southern Illinois counties. It voted solidly Democratic until Warren G. Harding carried the county in his record 1920 landslide. It voted Republican again in Herbert Hoover's landslide of 1928, but otherwise was firmly Democratic until World War II, when opposition to US involvement turned the county to Wendell Willkie and then Thomas E. Dewey. Between 1948 and 2004, Jersey County became something of a bellwether county, voting for every winning presidential candidate except in the Catholicism-influenced 1960 election, and that of 1988 which was heavily influenced by a major Midwestern drought. Disagreement with the Democratic Party's liberal views on social issues since the 1990s has caused a powerful swing back to the Republicans in the past quarter-century. As is typical of the Upland South, Hillary Clinton in 2016 did far worse than any previous Democrat, while Joe Biden performed marginally better in the 2020 election.

Jersey County is located in Illinois's 15th congressional district and is currently represented by Mary Miller (R-Oakland) in the U.S. House of Representatives.

== Notable people ==
- Jennie Florella Holmes (1842–1892), suffragist and temperance activist

== See also ==
- Jersey County Journal
- National Register of Historic Places listings in Jersey County, Illinois
