= Fieldon, Illinois =

Fieldon
- Village
- Location of Fieldon in Jersey County, Illinois.
- Coordinates: 39°06′30″N 90°30′03″W
- Country: United States
- State: Illinois
- County: Jersey
- Township: Richwoods

Government
  - Type: Mayor-Council

Area
  - Total: 0.20 sq mi (0.52 km^{2})
  - Land: 0.20 sq mi (0.52 km^{2})
  - Water: 0 sq mi (0.00 km^{2})
- Elevation: 692 ft (211 m)

Population (2020)
  - Total: 176
  - Density: 869.3/sq mi (335.65/km^{2})
- Time zone: UTC-6 (CST)
  - Summer (DST): UTC-5 (CDT)
- Zip code: 62031
- Area code: 618
- FIPS code: 17-26012
- GNIS feature ID: 2398874

Fieldon is a village in Jersey County, Illinois, United States. As of the 2020 census, the village had a total population of 176.

== History ==
The town was founded in the 1830s by a man known as John Field. It is believed that the town grew as a trading post for travelers on the Illinois River. When the construction of the Chicago, Burlington and Quincy Railroad made its way through the neighboring city of Jerseyville in 1853 it brought even more businesses to the area. During the Civil War Fieldon was a known stop for the Underground Railroad. The town also sent troops for the 122nd Illinois Infantry Regiment. In the early 1900s Feildon saw a boom in industry which included canneries, sawmills, and more. After the Great Depression the town saw its economy shift towards agriculture. Feildon saw a peak population in the 1980s at 299 individuals and has since seen a steady decline.

== Geography ==
According to the 2021 census gazetteer files, Fieldon has a total area of 0.20 square miles (0.52 km^{2}), all land.

== Demographics ==
Historical population
Census	Pop.	Note	%±
1880	298		—
1890	292		−2.0%
1900	259		−11.3%
1910	227		−12.4%
1920	248		9.3%
1930	232		−6.5%
1940	217		−6.5%
1950	250		15.2%
1960	239		−4.4%
1970	257		7.5%
1980	299		16.3%
1990	277		−7.4%
2000	271		−2.2%
2010	239		−11.8%
2020	176		−26.4%
U.S. Decennial Census

As of the 2020 census there were 176 people, 76 households, and 50 families residing in the village. The population density was 871.29 inhabitants per square mile (336.41/km^{2}). There were 107 housing units at an average density of 529.70 per square mile (204.52/km^{2}). The racial makeup of the village was 98.30% White, 0.00% African American, 0.00% Native American, 0.00% Asian, 0.00% Pacific Islander, 0.00% from other races, and 1.70% from two or more races. Hispanic or Latino of any race were 0.00% of the population.

There were 76 households, out of which 18.4% had children under the age of 18 living with them, 56.58% were married couples living together, 1.32% had a female householder with no husband present, and 34.21% were non-families. 31.58% of all households were made up of individuals, and 15.79% had someone living alone who was 65 years of age or older. The average household size was 2.50 and the average family size was 2.01.

The village's age distribution consisted of 16.3% under the age of 18, 5.2% from 18 to 24, 17% from 25 to 44, 30.1% from 45 to 64, and 31.4% who were 65 years of age or older. The median age was 54.8 years. For every 100 females, there were 118.6 males. For every 100 females age 18 and over, there were 113.3 males.

The median income for a household in the village was $38,750, and the median income for a family was $61,250. Males had a median income of $38,750 versus $38,125 for females. The per capita income for the village was $26,424. About 0.0% of families and 2.0% of the population were below the poverty line, including 0.0% of those under age 18 and 0.0% of those age 65 or over.

== Education ==
Fieldon is served by the public K-12 Jersey Community Unit School District 100. Fieldon Elementary School was located in the village until 2012, when it was permanently closed due to district realignment.
