= Illinois Route 100 =

State highway in southwestern Illinois, US

Illinois Route 100
- IL 100 highlighted in red

Route information
- Maintained by IDOT
- Length: 159.09 mi (256.03 km)
- Existed: 1924–present

Major junctions
- South end: US 67 in Alton
- I-72 / US 36 in Bluffs; US 67 / IL 104 in Meredosia; US 67 / IL 103 in Frederick; US 24 / US 136 in Lewistown
- North end: IL 78 in Dunfermline

Location
- Country: United States
- State: Illinois
- Counties: Madison, Jersey, Greene, Calhoun, Pike, Scott, Morgan, Cass, Schuyler, Fulton

Highway system
- Illinois State Highway System; Interstate; US; State; Tollways; Scenic
← IL 99	→ IL 101

Illinois Route 100 (IL-100) is a 159.09-mile-long (256.03 km) state highway in southwest Illinois. It generally parallels the Illinois River. Starting in downtown Alton, it trends northward to Buckheart Township near Canton. It makes up much of the Illinois River Road, a U.S. National Scenic Byway.

== Route description ==
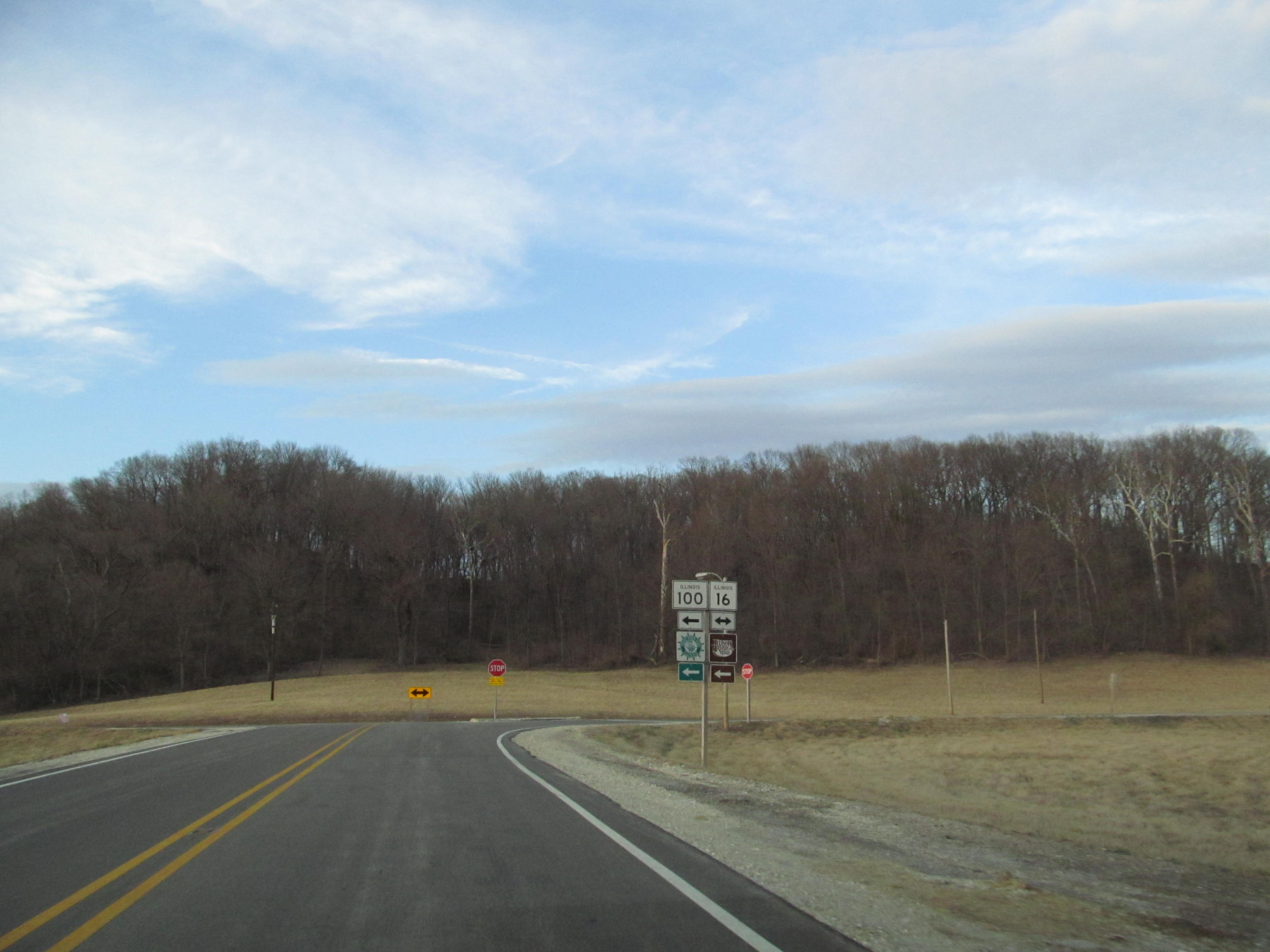
Southern end of IL 100 and IL 16 concurrence

The southern end in Alton is at U.S. Route 67 where Broadway, Landmarks, and Piasa Streets come together. It follows the east bank of the Mississippi River and Illinois River through Grafton until Hardin, where it crosses the Joe Page Bridge across the Illinois River. A portion of the Great River Road was on an old railroad alignment, which you can see parts of just north of Alton. During periods of high water, this highway is susceptible to flooding.

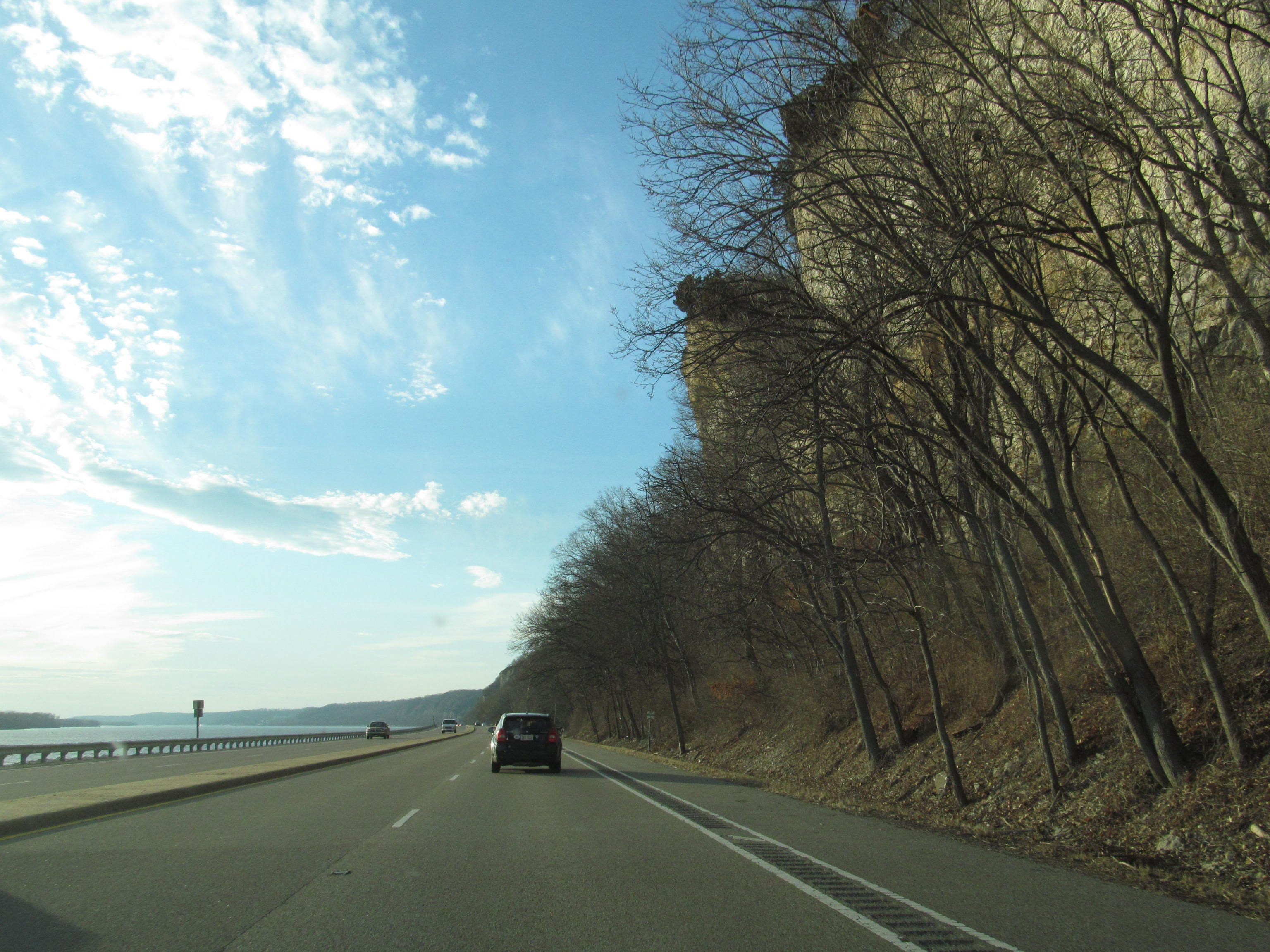
IL 100 along the Great River Road

North of Hardin, the highway follows the west bank of the Illinois River until the bridge near Florence. From that point on, IL 100 follows mostly farmland on much higher ground until Beardstown, where it will cross the river a third and final time. It will again follow the west bank of the Illinois River until US 136. After meeting with US 24 in Duncan Mills, IL 100 and US 24 is cosigned until Lewistown. North of Lewistown, IL 100 heads in a north-east alignment until its northern terminus with IL 78 near Dunfermline.

=== Illinois River Road ===
Illinois Route 100 overlaps the Illinois River Road from Grafton to Detroit.

== History ==
IL 100 originally went from Godfrey from the intersection at Godfrey Road and Homer M. Adams Parkway (IL 111/US 67) to Grafton on the current IL 3. In 1987, IL 3, 143, and 100 alignments were changed to their current routes in the River Bend (Illinois) area when the Homer M. Adams Parkway Extension was opened. On June 28, 2012, the Florence Bridge over the Illinois River was closed for at least 9 months by IDOT due to difficulties with the lifting mechanism that allows barge traffic to pass under the bridge. Inspections suggested that continued use of the lift span could harm the structural integrity of the bridge. As barges need to pass under the bridge, the lifting span was raised up and the bridge was closed. Motorists wishing to cross the river must use the signed detour utilizing Illinois Route 106, US Route 54, and Interstate 72/US Route 36. The bridge was repaired and reopened to traffic on April 22, 2013, only to be closed again for seven days of repairs after a barge collision on June 20, 2019.

== Major intersections ==
County	Location	mi	km	Destinations	Notes
Madison	Alton	0.00	0.00	US 67 (Piasa Street) / Great River Road south – Godfrey, St. Louis	Southern terminus
Jersey	Grafton	15.1	24.3	IL 3 south (North Market Street) / Illinois River Road	Northern terminus of IL 3; Illinois River Road begins at junction
Jersey	Richwood Township	30.7	49.4	IL 16 east – Jerseyville	Southern end of IL 16 concurrency
Calhoun	Hardin	36.6	58.9	IL 16 ends	Northern end of IL 16 concurrency; western terminus of IL 16
Calhoun	Kampsville	46.2	74.4	IL 96 north / Great River Road / Great River Road Spur begins – Quincy	Southern terminus of IL 96; northern end of Great River Road concurrency
Calhoun	Kampsville	46.5	74.8	IL 108 east (Marquette Street) / Great River Road Spur – Carrollton, Carlinville	Western terminus of IL 108; northern end of Great River Road Spur concurrency
Pike	Detroit	71.3	114.7	IL 106 west (Main Street) – Pittsfield	Western end of IL 106 concurrency
Scott		76.9	123.8	IL 106 east – Winchester	Eastern end of IL 106 concurrency
Scott		80.8	130.0	I-72 / US 36 – Springfield, Quincy	I-72 exit 46; diamond interchange
Morgan		91.1	146.6	US 67 south / IL 104 east – Jacksonville	Southern end of US 67/IL 104 concurrency
Morgan		92.0	148.1	IL 104 west – Meredosia, Quincy	Northern end of IL 104 concurrency
Cass	Beardstown	105.4	169.6	IL 125 east – Springfield	Western terminus of IL 125
Schuyler	Beardstown	107.4	172.8	US 67 north / IL 103 west – Rushville, Mt. Sterling	Northern end of US 67 concurrency; eastern terminus of IL 103
Fulton	Isabel Township	135.5	218.1	US 136 east / Illinois River Road north – Havana	Eastern end of US 136 concurrency
Fulton	Isabel Township	138.2	222.4	US 24 west – Rushville	Southern end of US 24 concurrency
Fulton	Isabel Township	140.4	226.0	US 136 west – Macomb	Western end of US 136 concurrency
Fulton	Lewistown	145.1	233.5	US 24 east / IL 97 south (East Avenue East) – Peoria	Northern end of US 24 concurrency; southern end of IL 97 concurrency
Fulton	Lewistown	146.5	235.8	IL 97 north – Cuba	Northern end of IL 97 concurrency
Fulton	Dunfermline	159.09	256.03	IL 78 – Canton, Havana	Northern terminus
1.000 mi = 1.609 km; 1.000 km = 0.621 mi: Concurrency terminus
