= Jersey Community Unit School District 100 =

School district in Jersey County, Illinois, United States

Coordinates: 39.116427°N 90.338575°W

Location
- Jerseyville, Illinois; United States

Other information
- Website: www.jersey100.org

Jersey Community Unit School District 100 is a public K-12 school district based in Jerseyville, Illinois, United States. The school district consists of five attendance centers in two municipalities, serving students in most of Jersey County, Illinois, and a small portion of southern Greene County, Illinois.

== District information ==
Total enrollment for the district is approximately 3,000 students each school year. The district area is 331.91 square miles (859.6 km^{2}), making the school district the second largest in Illinois by area. The current superintendent is Brad Tuttle.

The district is governed by a seven-member school board.

== Current schools ==
=== Elementary schools ===
- Grafton Elementary School - located in Grafton, serves Pre-Kindergarten through fifth grade, new building was opened in 2005
- Jerseyville East Elementary School - located in Jerseyville, serves second through fourth grades, building was extensively renovated and reopened in 2012
- Jerseyville West Elementary School - located in Jerseyville, serves Pre-Kindergarten through first grade

=== Middle schools ===
- Jersey Community Middle School - located in Jerseyville, serves fifth through seventh grades, was formerly named Illini Middle School until May 2018

=== High schools ===
- Jersey Community High School - located in Jerseyville, serves all students in eighth through twelfth grades, new building was opened in 2006

== Former schools ==
- Delhi Elementary School - located in Delhi, Illinois, served pre-kindergarten through fifth grade; closed in June 2012 due to district realignment.
- Dow Elementary School - located in Dow, served Kindergarten through fifth grade; closed in June 2011 due to district realignment.
- Fieldon Elementary School - located in Fieldon, served Kindergarten through fifth grade; closed in June 2012 due to district realignment.
- Kane Elementary School - located in Kane, served Kindergarten through sixth grade; closed in 1982 due to rising costs of maintenance.
