= List of lakes of Missouri =

This is a list of lakes and reservoirs in the U.S. state of Missouri. The lakes are ordered by their unique names, (e.g. Lake Smith or Smith Lake would both be listed under "S").

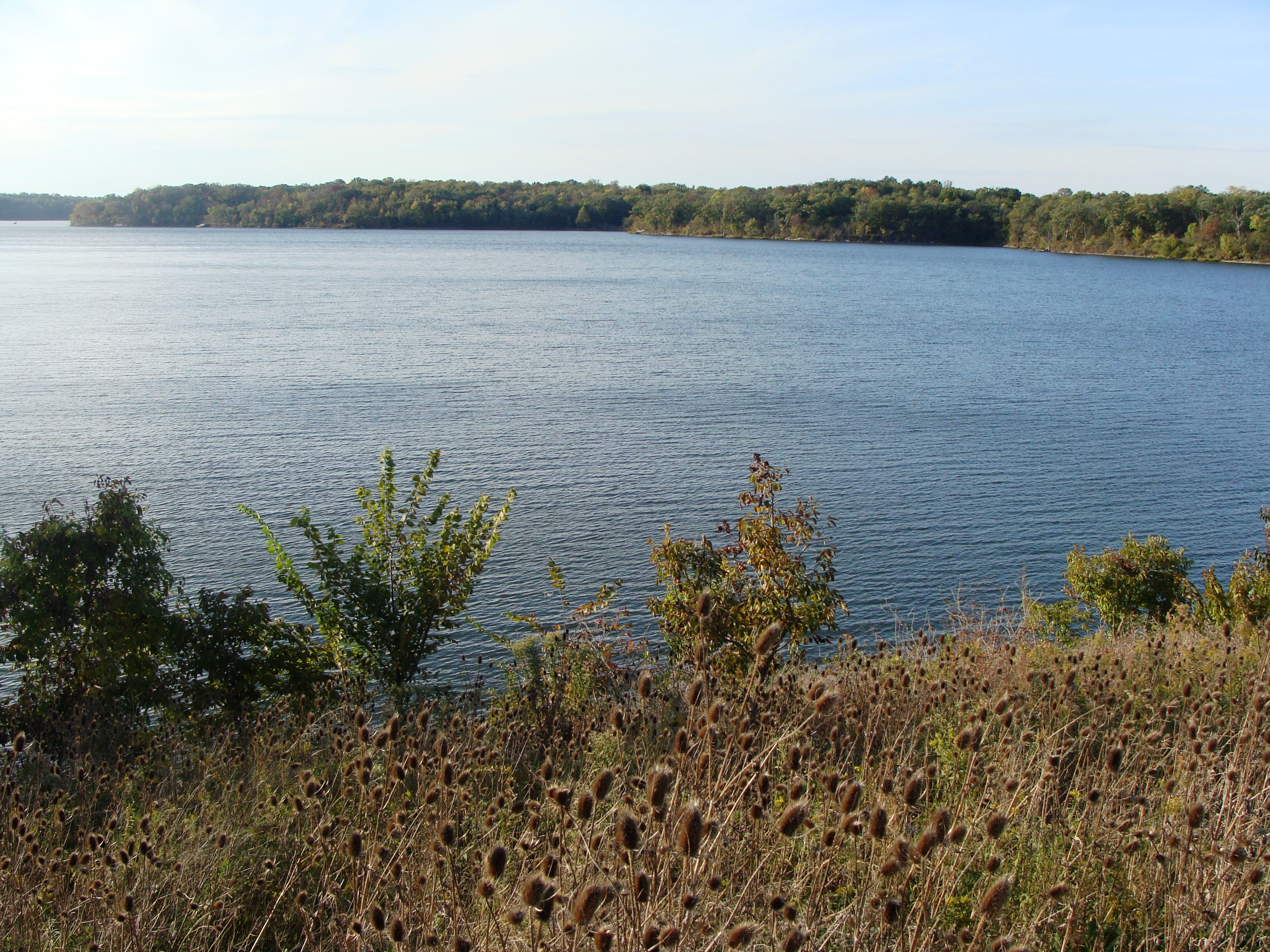
Blue Springs Lake

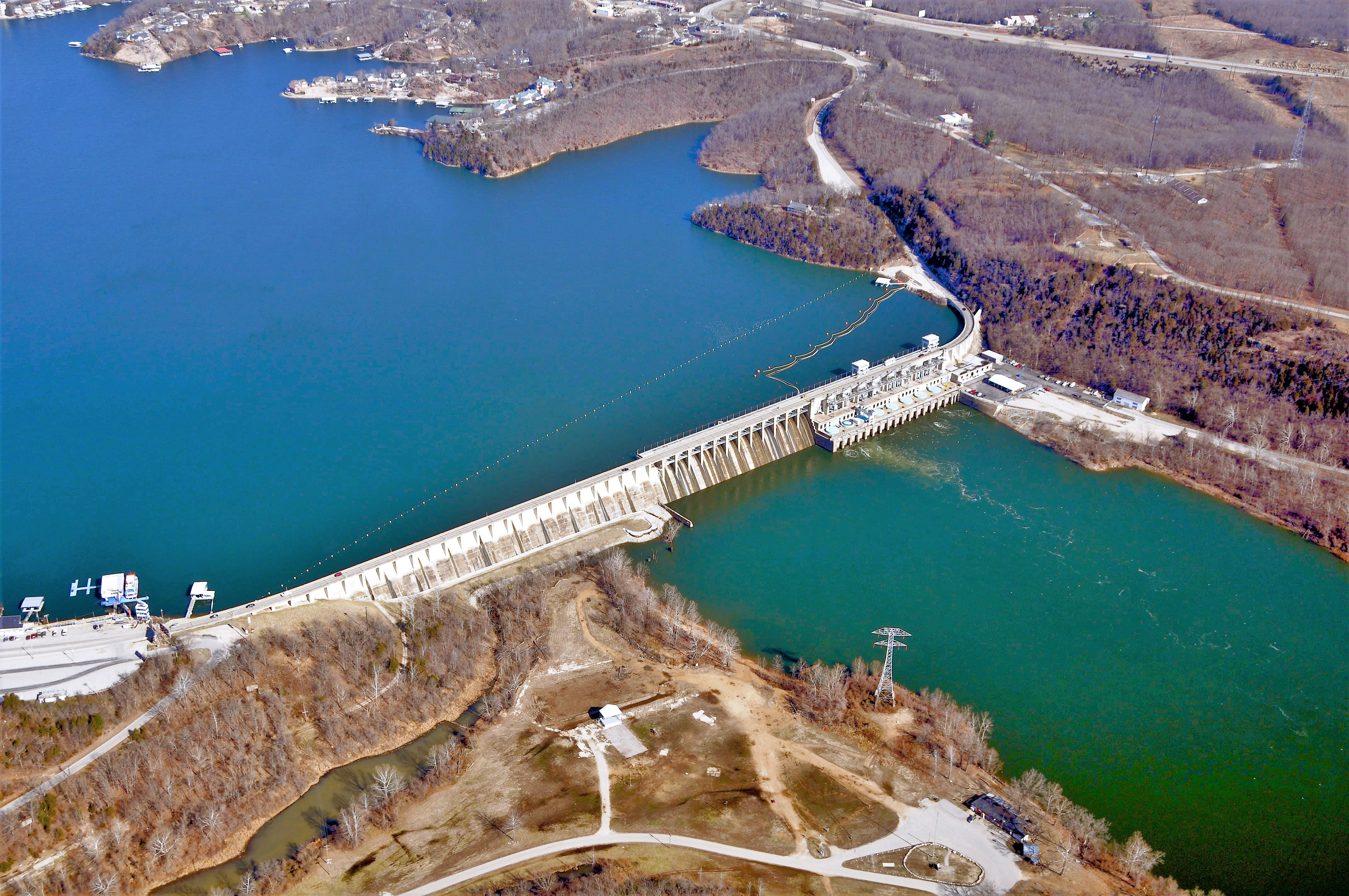
Lake of the Ozarks

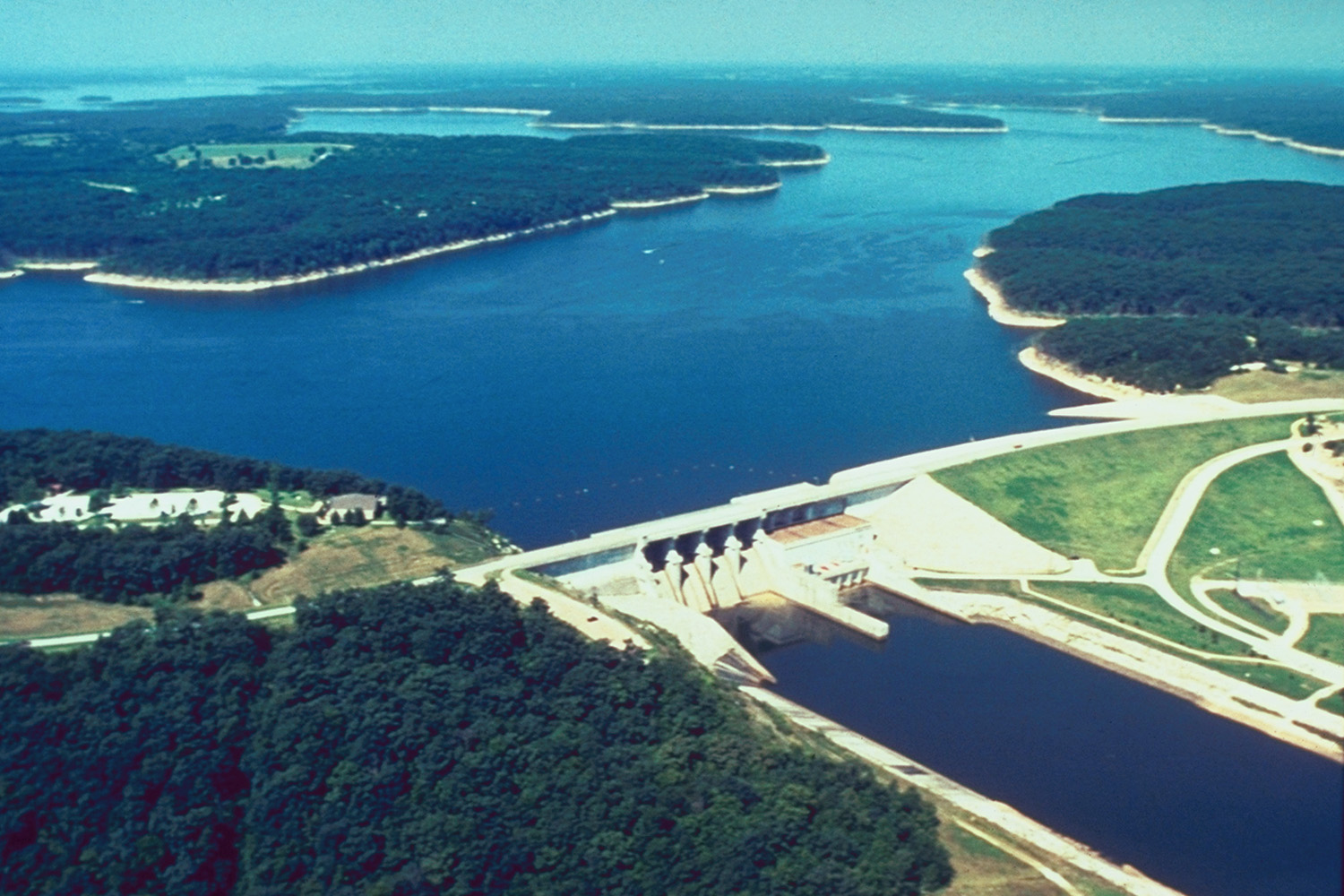
Mark Twain Lake

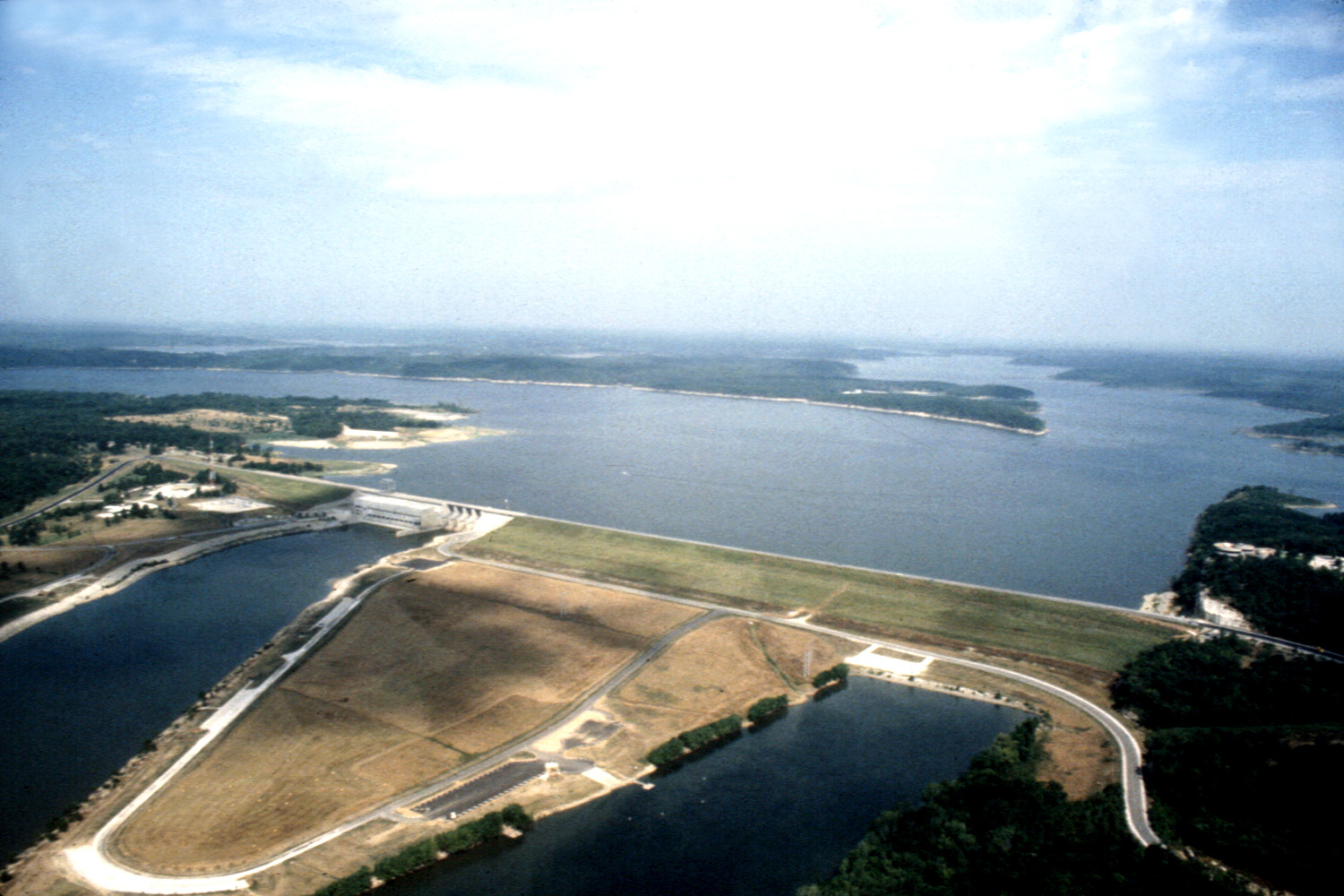
Truman Reservoir

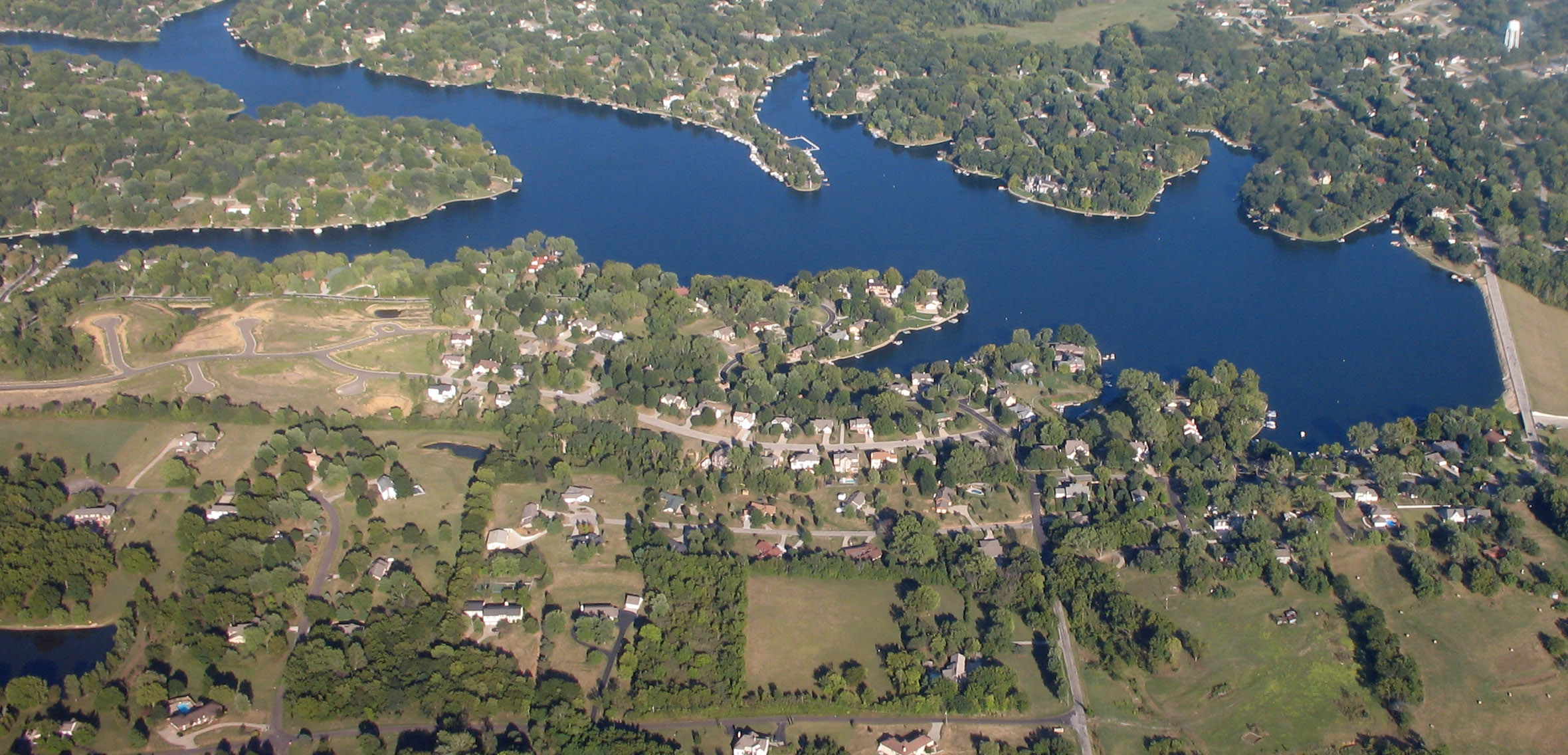
Weatherby Lake

Name	County	Type	Acreage	Watershed	Notes
Lake Annette	Cass	reservoir	44	Osage	
Lake Arrowhead	Clinton	reservoir	101	Missouri	
Bean Lake	Platte	oxbow	420	Missouri	
Big Lake	Holt	oxbow	646	Missouri	Largest natural lake in Missouri.
Bilby Ranch Lake	Nodaway	reservoir	110	Nodaway	
Blue Springs Lake	Jackson	reservoir	720	Missouri	
Bull Shoals Lake	Ozark and Taney	reservoir	45,150	White	Mostly located in Arkansas
Butterfly Lake	Ste. Genevieve	reservoir	65	Mississippi	
Lake Clare	Jackson	reservoir		Missouri	
Clearwater Lake	Reynolds and Wayne	reservoir	1,630	Black	
Lake Contrary	Buchanan	oxbow	335	Missouri	
Council Bluff Lake	Iron	reservoir	440	Big	
Creve Coeur Lake	St. Louis	oxbow	320	Missouri	
Fellows Lake	Greene	reservoir	860	Sac	
Forest Lake	Adair	reservoir	573	Chariton	
Frisco Lake	Phelps		5	Meramec	
Goose Creek Lake	St. Francois and Ste. Genevieve			Mississippi	
Houston Lake	Platte			Missouri	
Indian Lake	Crawford			Meramec	
Iron Mountain Lake	St. Francois			St. Francis	
Lake Jacomo	Jackson	reservoir	970	Missouri	
Lake Killarney	Iron	reservoir		Saint Francis	
Lake Lafayette	Lafayette			Missouri	
Leisure Lake	Grundy	reservoir		Grand	
Long Branch Lake	Macon	reservoir	2,400	Chariton	
Longview Lake	Jackson	reservoir	930	Missouri	
Lake Lotawana	Jackson	reservoir	600	Missouri	
Lake Lucas	Hickory	artificial	36	Osage	It is the world's first artificial lake built for drag boat racing
Mark Twain Lake	Monroe and Ralls	reservoir	18,600	Salt	
Lake Maurer	Clay			Missouri	
McDaniel Lake	Greene	reservoir	300	Sac	
Mozingo Lake	Nodaway	reservoir	1,006	Platte	
Lake Niangua	Camden	reservoir	360	Niangua	
Norfork Lake	Ozark	reservoir	22,000	White	Mostly located in Arkansas
Lake of the Ozarks	Benton, Camden, Miller, and Morgan	reservoir	54,000	Osage	
Pomme de Terre Lake	Hickory and Polk	reservoir	7,820	Osage	
Pony Express Lake	DeKalb		240	Grand	
Prairie Lee Lake	Jackson	reservoir	150	Missouri	
Riss Lake	Platte	reservoir		Missouri	
Silver Lake	Chariton		2,300	Grand	
Silver Lake	Stone			White	
Smithville Lake	Clay and Clinton	reservoir	7,190	Platte	
Spanish Lake	St. Louis			Missouri	
Lake Springfield	Greene	reservoir	318	James	
Lake St. Clair	Franklin			Meramec	
Lake St. Louis	St. Charles			Mississippi	
Stockton Lake	Cedar, Dade, and Polk	reservoir	24,900	Sac	
Swan Lake	Chariton		1,100	Grand	
Table Rock Lake	Barry, Stone, and Taney	reservoir	43,100	White	Partly located in Arkansas
Lake Taneycomo	Taney	reservoir		White	
Lake Tapawingo	Jackson	reservoir		Missouri	
Tarsney Lake	Jackson			Missouri	
Lake Tekakwitha	Jefferson			Meramec	
Lake Timberline	St. Francois	reservoir		Big	
Truman Reservoir	Benton, Henry, Hickory, and St. Clair	reservoir	55,600	Osage	
Valley Water Mill Pond	Greene	reservoir	13	Sac	
Lake Viking	Daviess	reservoir	630	Grand	
Lake Wappapello	Butler and Wayne	reservoir	8,400	Saint Francis	
Lake Waukomis	Platte			Missouri	
Weatherby Lake	Platte	reservoir	274	Missouri	
Wildwood Lake	Jackson	reservoir		Missouri	
Wildwood Lake	Jefferson	reservoir		Mississippi	
Wing Lake	Washington	reservoir		Big	
Lake Winnebago	Cass			Osage	

== See also ==
- List of dams and reservoirs in Missouri
- Lists of lakes of the United States
