= List of dams and reservoirs in Missouri =

Following is a list of dams and reservoirs in Missouri.

All major dams are linked below. The National Inventory of Dams defines any "major dam" as being 50 feet (15 m) tall with a storage capacity of at least 5,000 acre-feet (6,200,000 m^{3}), or of any height with a storage capacity of 25,000 acre-feet (31,000,000 m^{3}).

== Dams and reservoirs in Missouri ==
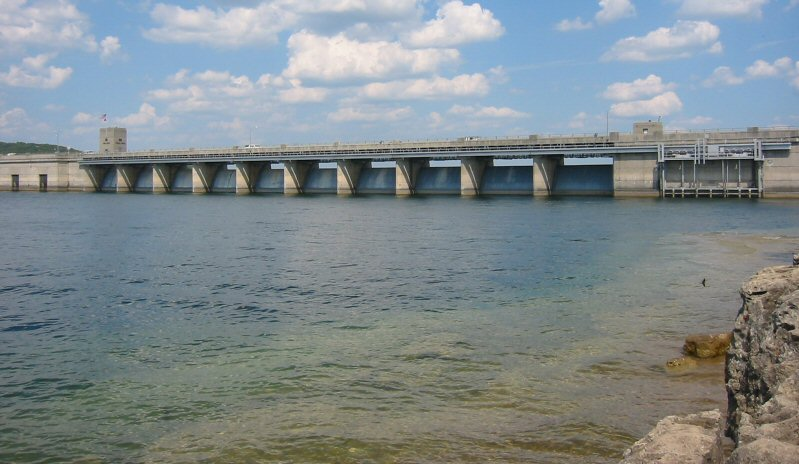
Table Rock Dam

=== Major ===
- Bagnell Dam, Lake of the Ozarks, AmerenUE
- Bull Shoals Lake (extending north from Arkansas), United States Army Corps of Engineers
- Clarence Cannon Dam, Mark Twain Lake, USACE
- Clearwater Dam, Clearwater Lake, USACE
- Fellows Lake Dam, Fellows Lake, City of Springfield, Missouri
- Harry S. Truman Dam, Truman Reservoir, USACE
- Lock and Dam No. 20, Mississippi River, USACE
- Lock and Dam No. 21, Mississippi River, USACE
- Lock and Dam No. 22, Mississippi River, USACE
- Lock and Dam No. 24, Mississippi River, USACE
- Lock and Dam No. 25, Mississippi River, USACE
- Lock and Dam No. 26 (historical), Mississippi River, USACE
- Long Branch Dam, Long Branch Lake, USACE
- Melvin Price Locks and Dam, Mississippi River, USACE
- Pomme de Terre Dam, Pomme de Terre Lake, USACE
- Powersite Dam, Lake Taneycomo, Empire District Electric Company
- Smithville Dam, Smithville Lake, USACE
- Stockton Dam, Stockton Lake, USACE
- Table Rock Dam, Table Rock Lake, USACE
- Wappapello Dam, Lake Wappapello, USACE

=== Other ===
- Valley Water Mill Pond
- Whitefish Chain of Lakes

== See also ==
- List of lakes of Missouri
