= Clair Lake =

Clair Lake may refer to:

== Place names ==
- Clair Lake (Sainte-Christine-d'Auvergne), a lake on the slope of the Noire River, Portneuf Regional County Municipality, Capitale-Nationale, Quebec, Canada
- Claire River (Thompson River tributary), a river of Quebec
- Clair Lake (inventor)

== See also ==
- Lake Clare, a lake in the U.S. state of Missouri
- Lake Claire (disambiguation)
- Lake Saint Clair (disambiguation)
