= Meeting of the Great Rivers Scenic Route =

Scenic highway in Illinois, United States

Meeting of the Great Rivers Scenic Route
- Meeting of the Great Rivers Scenic Route highlighted in red

Route information
- Maintained by IDOT
- Length: 33.0 mi (53.1 km)
- Existed: June 8, 1998–present

Major junctions
- South end: Hartford
- North end: Grafton

Location
- Country: United States
- State: Illinois
- Counties: Jersey, Madison

Highway system
- Scenic Byways; National; National Forest; BLM; NPS; Illinois State Highway System; Interstate; US; State; Tollways; Scenic

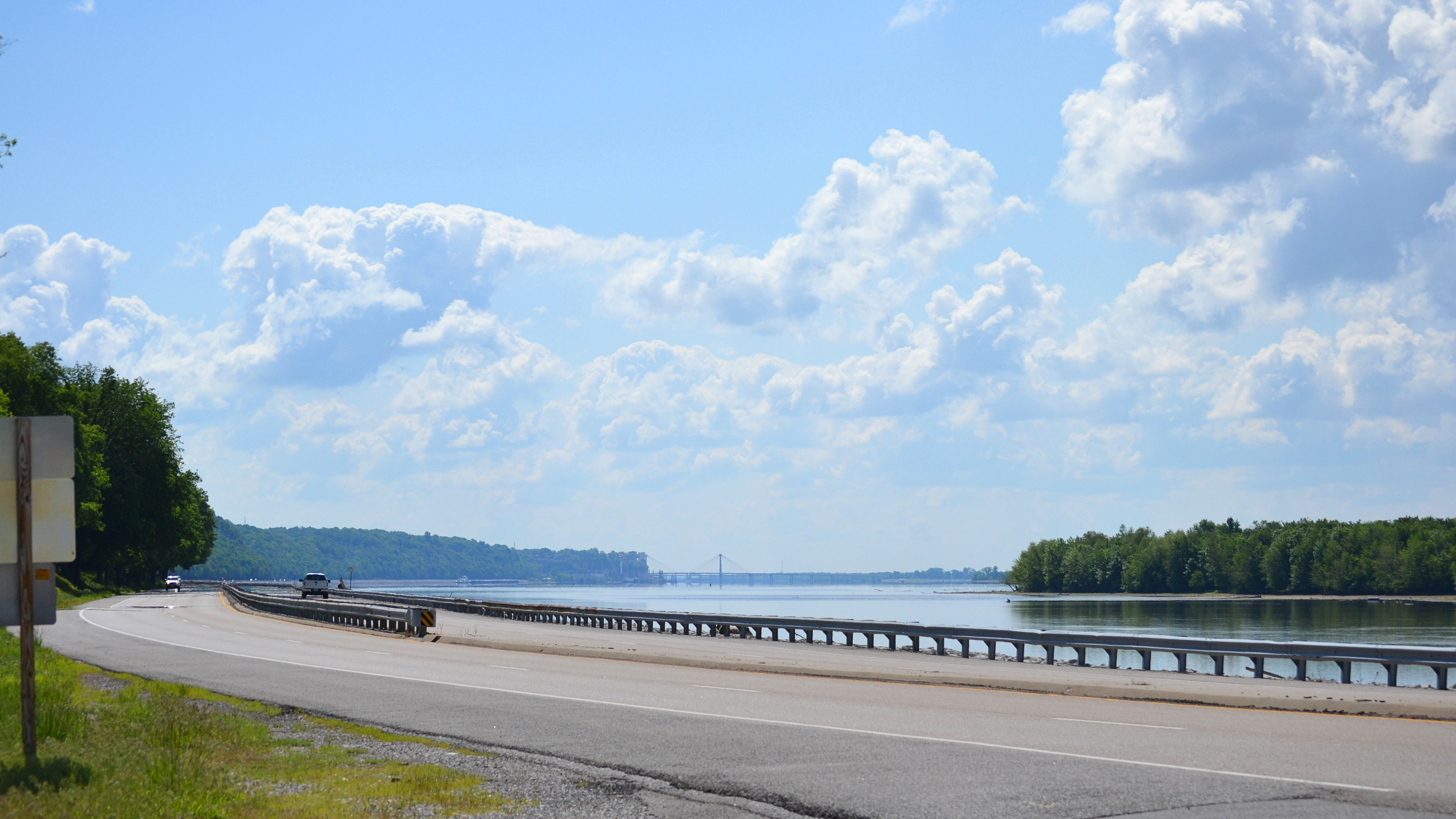
Illinois Route 100 along the Mississippi River

The Meeting of the Great Rivers Scenic Route extends for 33.0 miles (53.1 km) in southwestern Illinois, travelling through the floodplain of the Mississippi and Illinois Rivers. The route has been officially designated as a National Scenic Byway by the Federal Highway Administration. The route coincides with a portion of the Great River Road.

== Route description ==
The north end of the route is at Pere Marquette State Park, located at the confluence of the Mississippi and Illinois Rivers. The south end of the route is at the Lewis and Clark State Historic Site, located near the confluence of the Mississippi and Missouri Rivers. The cities and villages of Grafton, Chautauqua, Elsah, Alton, East Alton, Wood River and Hartford are located along the route.

The Sam Vadalabene Bike Trail parallels the route between Pere Marquette State Park and Alton. The Confluence Bike Trail parallels the route from Alton south to Hartford. Other major points of interest along the Route include Piasa Park, the Clark Bridge in Alton, and the National Great Rivers Museum at the Melvin Price Locks and Dam.

== History ==
The Meeting of the Great Rivers Scenic Route was designated as an Illinois State Scenic Byway on June 8, 1998. It was later added to the National Scenic Byway program on June 15, 2000, with an addition that extended the existing byway from East Alton south to New Poag Road. In May 2007, the Illinois Bureau of Tourism announced that the route was officially chosen as one of the "Seven Wonders of Illinois".
