= Wildwood Lake =

Wildwood Lake can refer to:

- Lake Wildwood, California
- Wildwood Lake (Georgia)
- Wildwood Lake (Jackson County, Missouri)
- Wildwood Lake (Jefferson County, Missouri)
- Wildwood Lake (New York)
- Wildwood Lake, Tennessee
