= Spanish Lake =

Spanish Lake can refer to:

A lake

- Spanish Lake in Fresno County, California
- Spanish Lake (Ascension Parish), a lake in the US state of Louisiana
- Spanish Lake (Iberia Parish), a lake in the US state of Louisiana
- Spanish Lake (Missouri), a lake in the US state of Missouri

A peak

- Spanish Lake Centre, a peak of the Flourmill Volcanoes in British Columbia, Canada

A Populated Place

- Spanish Lake, Missouri, a suburb of St. Louis in the United States
- Spanish Lake community, a village in Natchitoches Parish, Louisiana

Other uses

- Spanish Lake (film), a film about the city in Missouri
- The Spanish Lake is a nickname given to the Pacific Ocean in certain sources between 1521 and 1898.

See also

- List of lakes § Spain
