= Confluence Trail =

Bike trail in Illinois

Coordinates: 38.8136°N 90.1005°W

The Confluence Trail, part of the Madison County, Illinois Transit (MCT) bikeways network, is a 20.5-mile (33.0 km) bike trail between Granite City and Alton, Illinois's Russell Commons Park. The majority of the trail is paved asphalt on top of the Mississippi River levee system. The trail is part of the St. Louis metro area's Confluence Greenway.

== Background ==
Points of interest along the trail include the Clark Bridge in Alton, the National Great Rivers Museum at Melvin Price Locks and Dam, the Lewis and Clark State Historic Site, the confluence of the Mississippi and Missouri Rivers, the Chain of Rocks Canal, Chouteau Island and the Old Chain of Rocks Bridge (former U.S. Route 66 crossing).

The Lewis and Clark Confluence Tower is also located directly on the trail.
