= Confluence Greenway =

Park system in the St. Louis area, Missouri, USA

In 1997, with support from The McKnight Foundation, a group of non-profit organizations led by Trailnet formed a partnership to plan and implement the Confluence Greenway. The Confluence Greenway was planned as a 200-square-mile (520 km^{2}) system of parks, conservation and recreation areas located in the St. Louis, Missouri metropolitan area. Various parks, trails, and attractions are located along forty miles of both the Missouri and Illinois banks of the Mississippi River and Missouri River.

== Background ==
The greenway connects the confluence of the Mississippi and Missouri rivers to the St. Louis Riverfront.

Points of interest within the Confluence Greenway are Chouteau Island, the Old Chain of Rocks Bridge, the Jones-Confluence Point State Park, the Eads Bridge, the National Great Rivers Museum at Melvin Price Locks and Dam, Lewis and Clark State Historic Site, MCT Confluence Bike Trail, the Sam Vadalabene Bike Trail, Piasa Park, Pere Marquette State Park and the Katy Trail.

In 2014 the Confluence Greenway plan became part of the Mississippi Greenway plan managed by Great Rivers Greenway.

== See also ==
- Great Rivers Greenway District
