= Sam Vadalabene Bike Trail =

Recreational trail in Illinois, United States

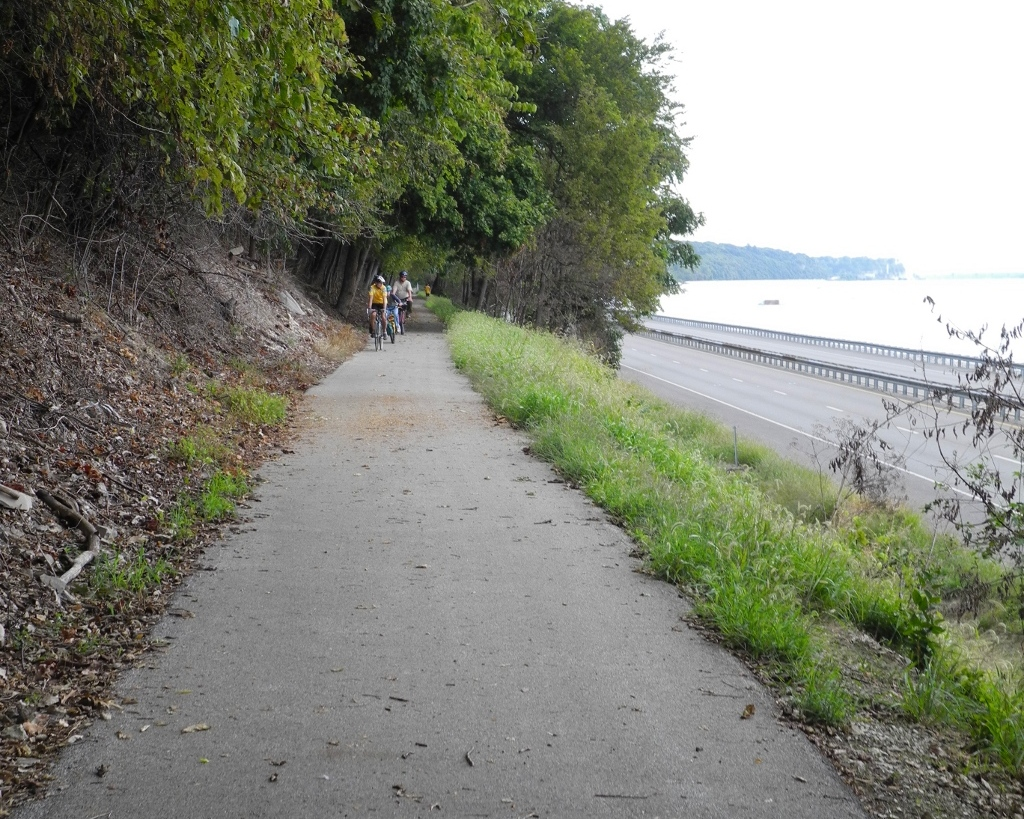
The Vadalabene trail parallels Route 100 which parallels the Mississippi River above Alton.

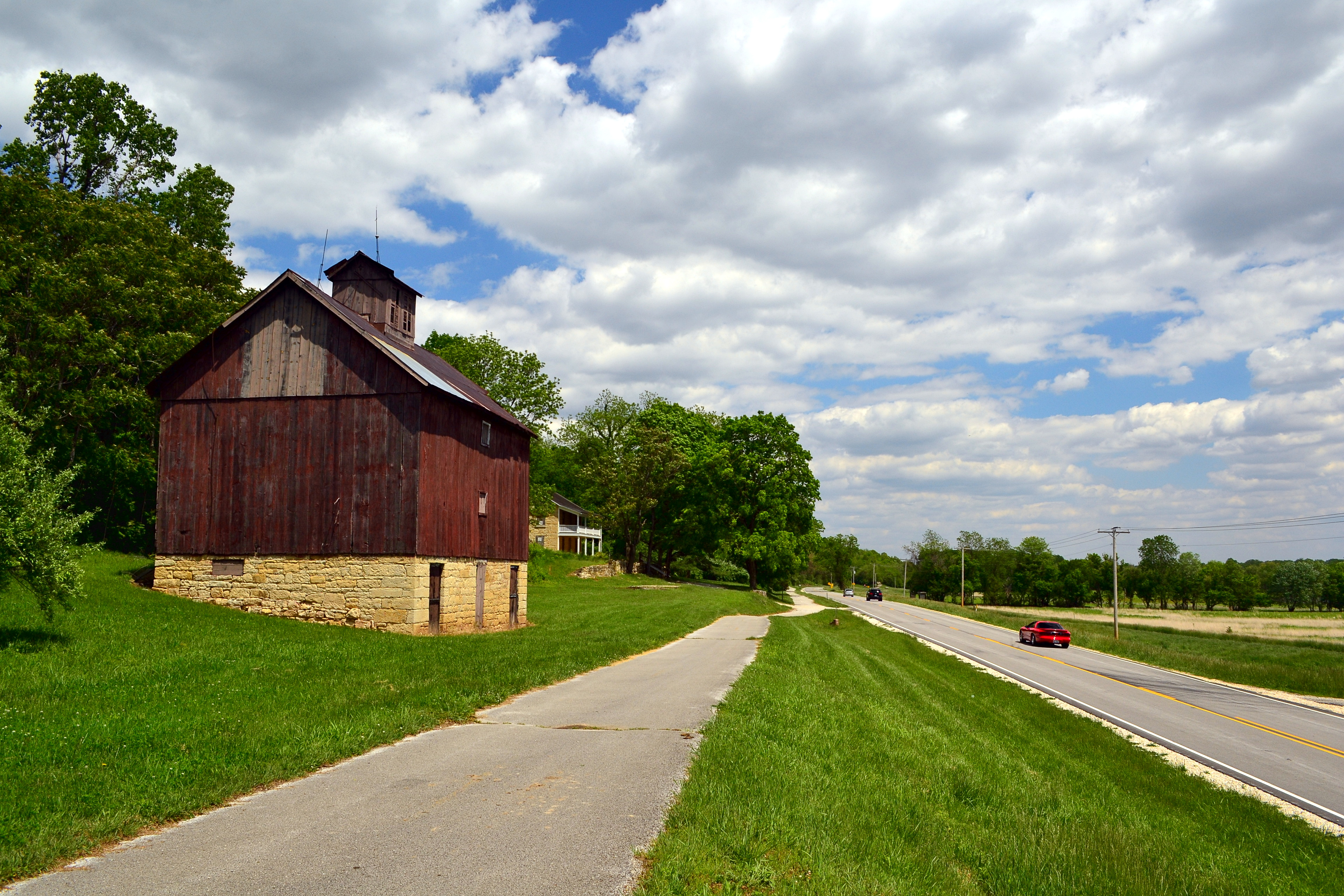
Near Pere Marquette State Park and the western terminus of the trail

The Sam Vadalabene Bike Trail, is a paved 21.5 mile biking/walking trail located in southwestern Illinois, located just north of the St. Louis, Missouri core urban area.

The trail was named after Sam M. Vadalabene, a member of the Illinois Senate. The trail parallels both the Mississippi River and the Meeting of the Great Rivers Scenic Byway and was designated as a National Recreation Trail in 2006. The trail is included as part of the Confluence Greenway.

The south end of the trail is located at Piasa Park, located about five miles northwest of Alton (38°53′51.3″N 90°11′57.5″W), and the north end of the trail is located at Pere Marquette State Park near Grafton (38°58′19.4″N 90°32′34.0″W). Other attractions along the trail include the village of Elsah, Chautauqua, the city of Grafton, limestone bluffs rising up to 250 feet (75 m) high, and the Marquette Monument.

The original fifteen miles of the trail were completed in 1979. At the south end of the trail, connections can be made to both the Confluence Trail and the Katy Trail.
