= Lake Maurer =

- Location within Missouri Location within the United States
- Location: Clay County, Missouri
- Coordinates: 39°19′23″N 94°13′52″W
- Type: lake
- Basin countries: United States
- Surface elevation: 751 ft (229 m)

Lake Maurer is a lake in Clay County in the U.S. state of Missouri.

Lake Maurer is named after J. F. and J. H. Maurer, proprietors of a resort on the shore of the lake.

== See also ==
- List of lakes in Missouri
