= Camp Dubois =

United States historic place; launching point for the Lewis and Clark Expedition

Coordinates: 38°48′09.8″N 90°06′04.5″W

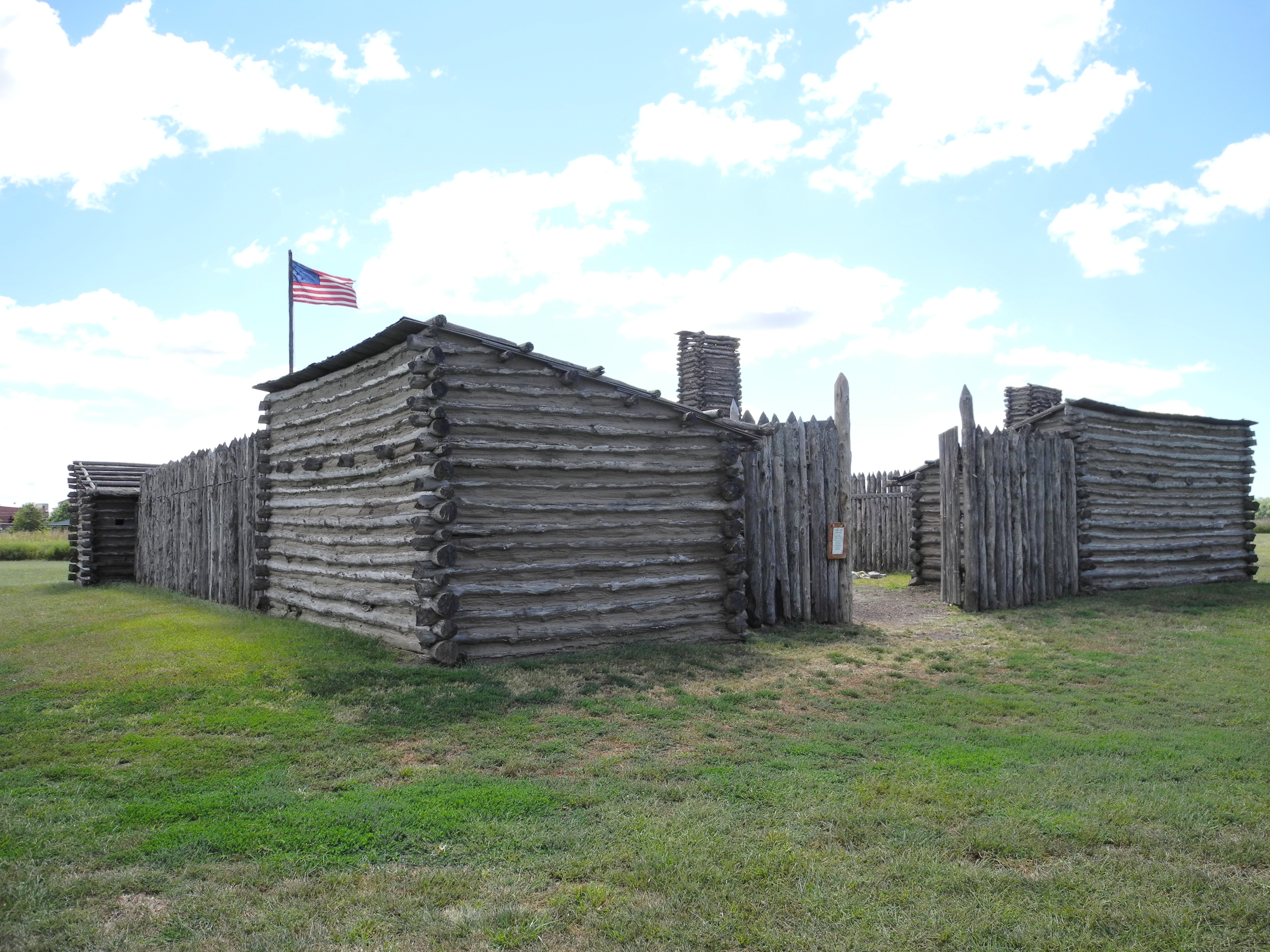
Reconstruction of Camp Dubois in Hartford, Illinois

Camp Dubois (English: Camp Wood), near present-day Wood River, Illinois, served as the winter camp and launch-point for the exploration of the Louisiana Purchase and Pacific Northwest by the Lewis and Clark Expedition of the United States.

Founded at the confluence with the Rivière du Bois (Wood River) on December 12, 1803, it was located on the east side of the Mississippi River so that it was still in United States territory. This was important because the transfer of the Louisiana Purchase to France from Spain did not occur until March 9, 1804, and then from France to the United States on March 10, 1804. The expedition returned again to the camp on their return journey on September 23, 1806.

In 1803, at Cahokia, Lewis and Clark had met a well known French citizen, Nicholas Jarrot, who owned 400 acres on the river du Bois, and he agreed to let them establish their camp there. William Clark established Camp Dubois, with a group of men that he recruited from Kaskaskia and Fort Massac, constructing a frontier fort. Captain Meriwether Lewis joined the camp several weeks later after gathering information about Upper Louisiana and the west from Cahokia, Kaskaskia, St. Louis and other locations. Also during this time, Lewis took the opportunity to smooth relations with the Spanish authorities in St Louis to make the transfer of the Louisiana Purchase easier.

Lewis and Clark Expedition map

Camp Dubois was a fully operating military camp. Soldiers stationed at the camp were required to participate in training, maintain personal cleanliness, police the camp and other duties spelled out by the United States military based on the training manuals of Baron von Steuben. They had inspections, marched, stood guard duty and hunted to supplement their military rations. Sergeant John Ordway was in charge of the camp during periods in which both Lewis and Clark were away.

On May 14, 1804, the Expedition, under Clark's command, left Camp River Dubois on the east side of the Mississippi River and sailed up the Missouri River.

== Memorial ==
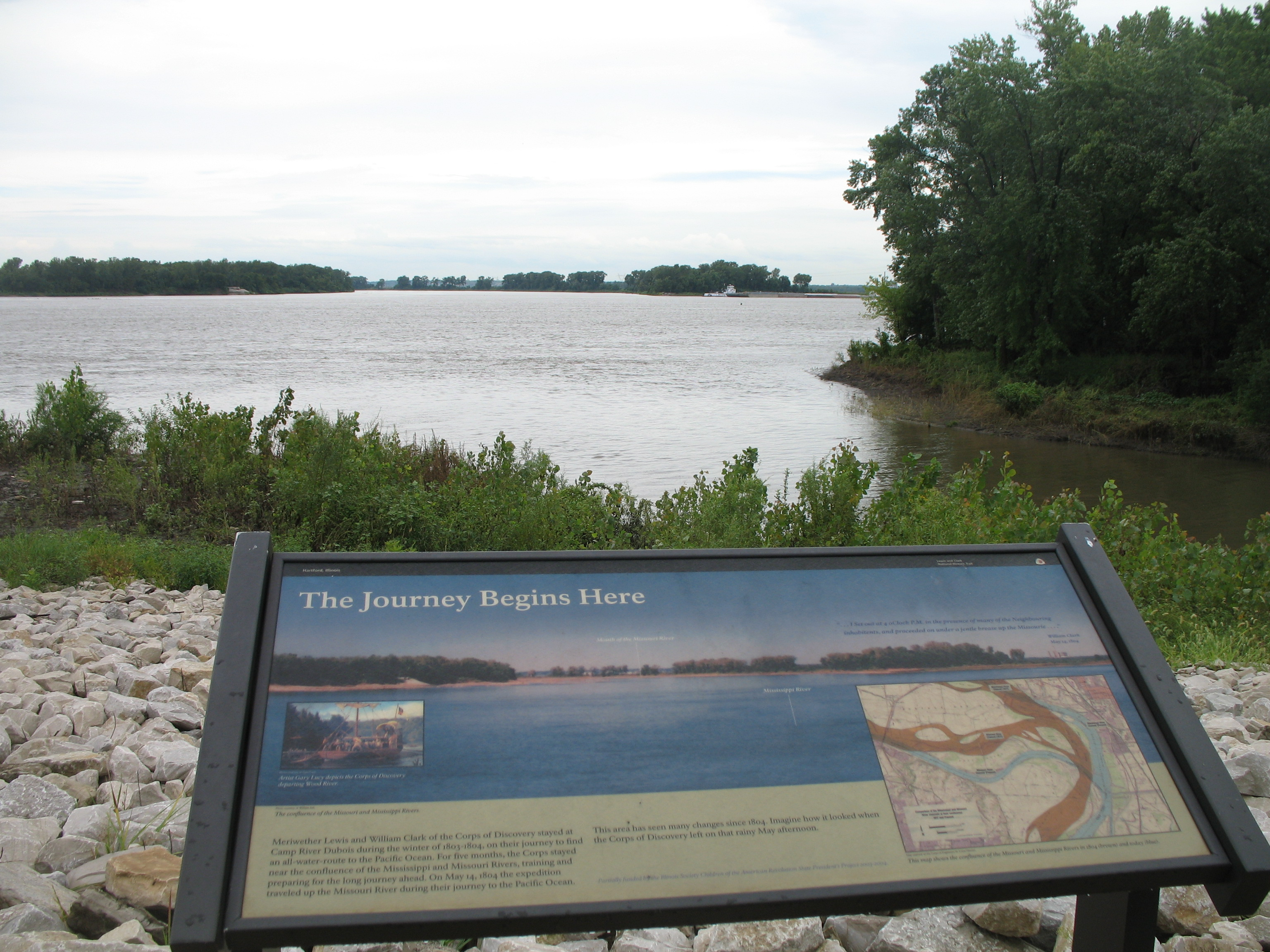
Memorialized starting point of the Lewis and Clark Expedition with the confluence of the Missouri and Mississippi Rivers in the background

The Lewis and Clark State Historic Site has been established south of the actual winter camp site of the Expedition in Hartford, Illinois. It is located across the Mississippi from the present mouth of the Missouri, as the original camp was; however, the rivers have altered their courses, making the original site inaccessible. The Historic Site contains a museum center and reconstructed replica of Camp Dubois.

== See also ==
- Timeline of the Lewis and Clark Expedition
