= Hartford Castle =

Ruined 19th century residence near Hartford, Illinois

- Lakeview
- Location within Illinois
- Alternative names: Lakeview

General information
- Status: Ruins
- Type: Residence
- Location: Near Hartford, Illinois, United States
- Coordinates: 38.800600°N 90.084600°W
- Construction started: 1897
- Completed: 1897
- Owner: John J. Biszantz

Hartford Castle is the ruins of a 19th-century residence located near Hartford, Illinois, United States. It is located at 38°48′2″N 90°5′4″W (38.800600, -90.084600) approximately 15 miles (24 km) north of downtown St. Louis, Missouri. The official name of the home was Lakeview. It was constructed by John J. Biszantz, a real estate developer from St. Louis. Born and raised in Ohio, Biszantz built the estate in 1897 after his wife Lillie, who was also from St. Louis, died in 1890.

== Sources ==
- Taylor, Troy (2005). Weird Illinois. Sterling Publishing Co., Inc. pp. 232–233. ISBN 0-7607-5943-X.
- Taylor, Troy. "Hartford Castle". Archived from the original on 2007-02-13.
