= Confluence Tower =

Tower in Illinois, U.S.

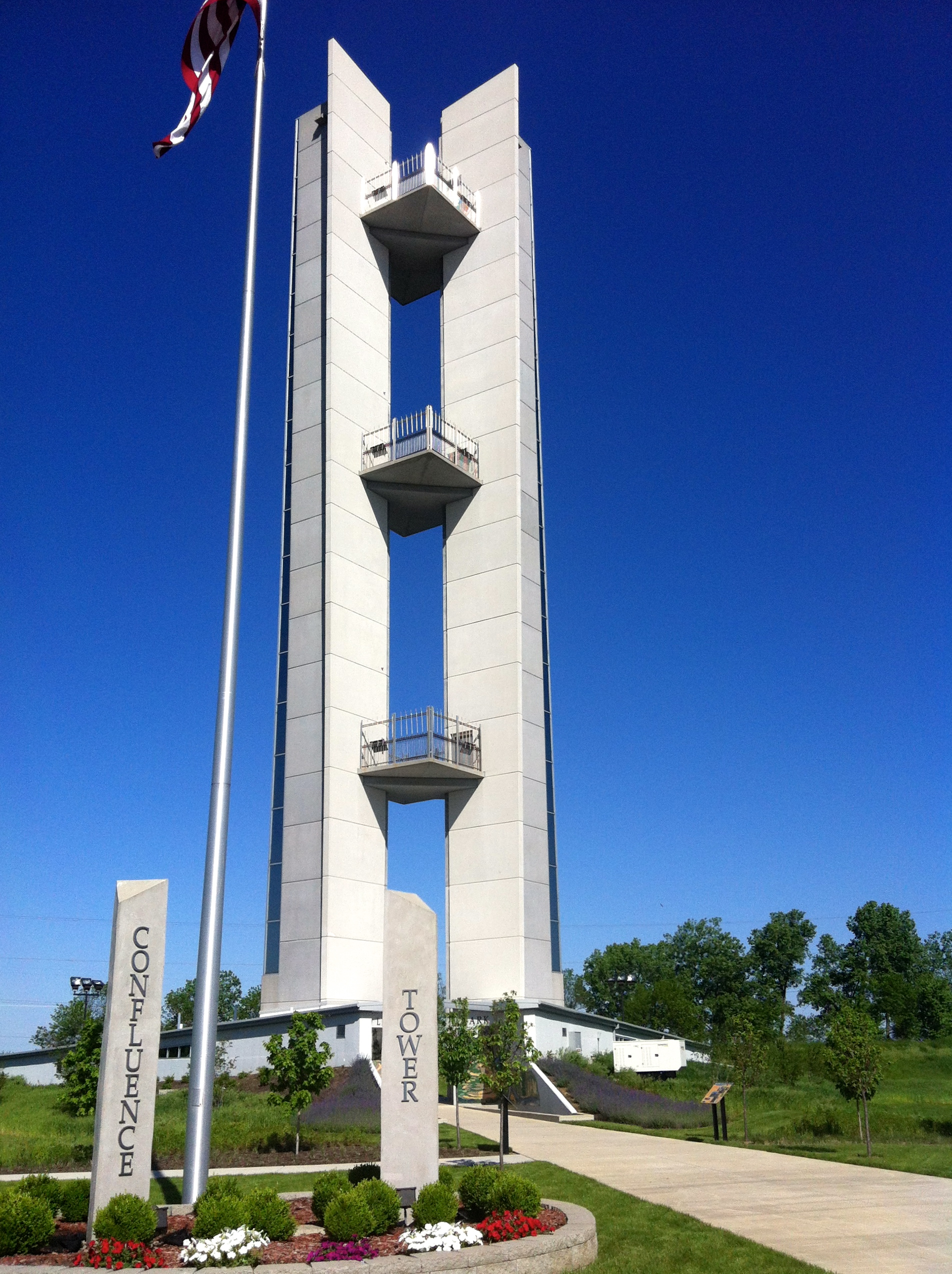
- The Confluence Tower in May 2013
- Interactive map of the Confluence Tower area
- Alternative names: Lewis and Clark Confluence Tower

General information
- Location: 435 Confluence Tower Drive, Hartford, Illinois, United States
- Coordinates: 38.8109°N 90.1007°W
- Construction started: 2002
- Completed: 2010

Height
- Height: 180 ft (55 m)

The Lewis and Clark Confluence Tower is a 180-foot-tall (55 m) tower on the Illinois bank of the Mississippi River at the confluence of it and the Missouri River. The tower complements the Lewis and Clark State Historic Site, about one mile to the south, where the Lewis and Clark Expedition made winter camp before setting up the Missouri river.

The tower has platforms at 50, 100, and 150 feet, providing a good view of the confluence of the Missouri and Mississippi Rivers. Downtown St. Louis and the Gateway Arch can also be seen from the tower. The tower contains two legs joined by viewing platforms, with an elevator in one leg and stairs in the other. Its construction, lasting from 2002 to 2010, was funded by $5 million from local and state sources.
