= Lake Saint Clair (disambiguation) =

Lake St. Clair is a lake in North America, part of the international boundary between Michigan and Ontario, and carrying the water outflow of Lake Huron.

Lake Saint Clair, Lake St. Clair or St. Clair Lake may also refer to:

Australia

- Lake St Clair (New South Wales)
- Lake St Clair (South Australia), located in the locality of Nora Creina, South Australia
- Lake St Clair (Tasmania)

North America

- St. Clair Lake (Michigan), part of the Elk River Chain of Lakes Watershed
- Lake Saint Clair (Washington) in Thurston County, Washington
- Lake St. Clair, Missouri, a census-designated place

== See also ==
- Lake Sinclair
