= Council Bluff Lake =

Lake in Iron County, Missouri, United States

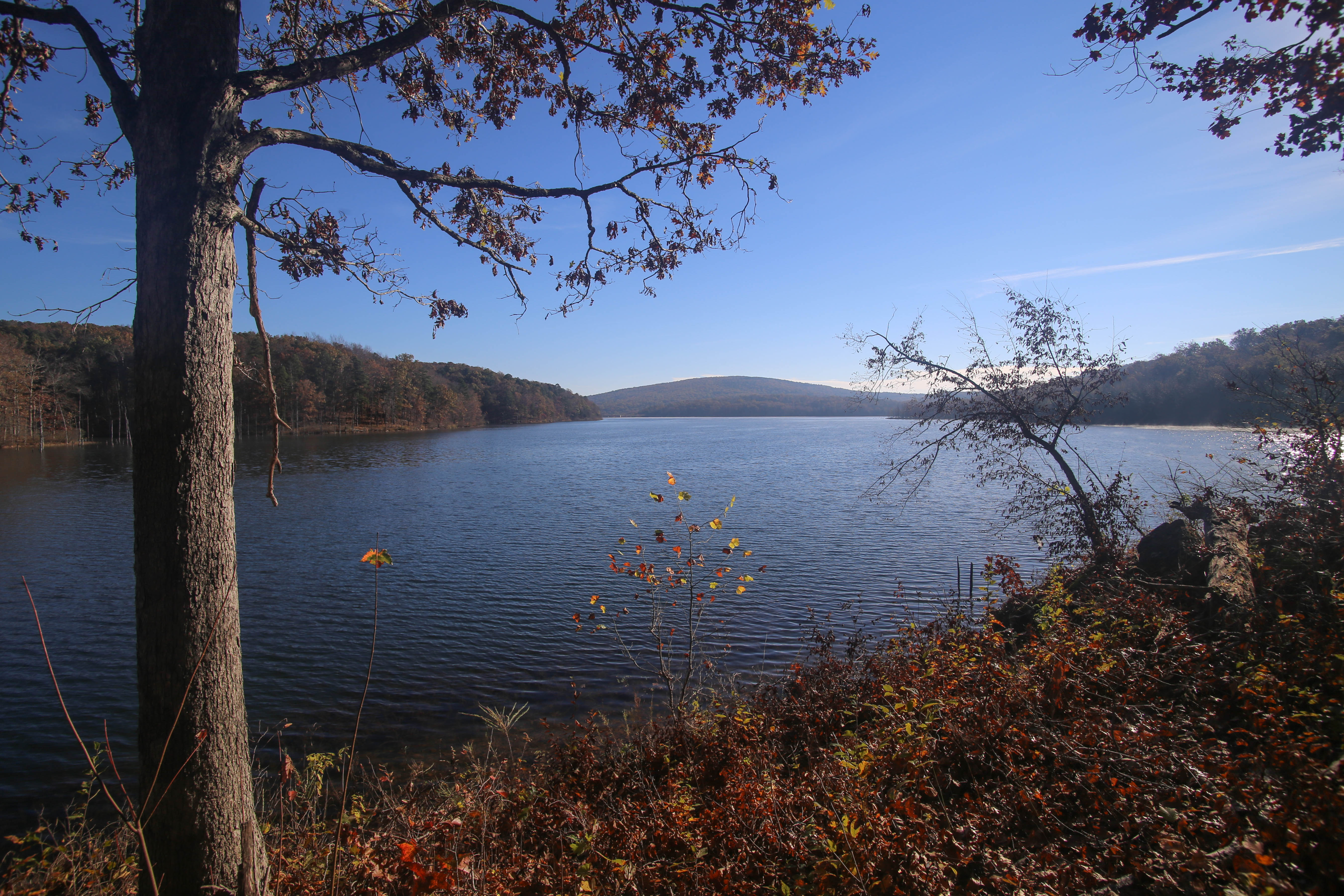

- Location within Missouri
- Location: Iron County, Missouri
- Coordinates: 37°43′37″N 90°54′54″W
- Surface area: 440 acres (1.8 km^{2})
- Max. depth: 87 ft (27 m)

Council Bluff Lake is a lake in Mark Twain National Forest in Iron County, Missouri, United States. It is 440 acres in area. Some parts of the lake are 87 feet deep.

The lake was created when Big River was dammed. The Council Bluff Dam construction began in 1979 and was completed in 1981. It was at the time the largest earthfill dam ever built by the USDA-Forest Service with an embankment height of 124 feet.

== Council Bluff Recreation Area ==
Council Bluff Recreation Area
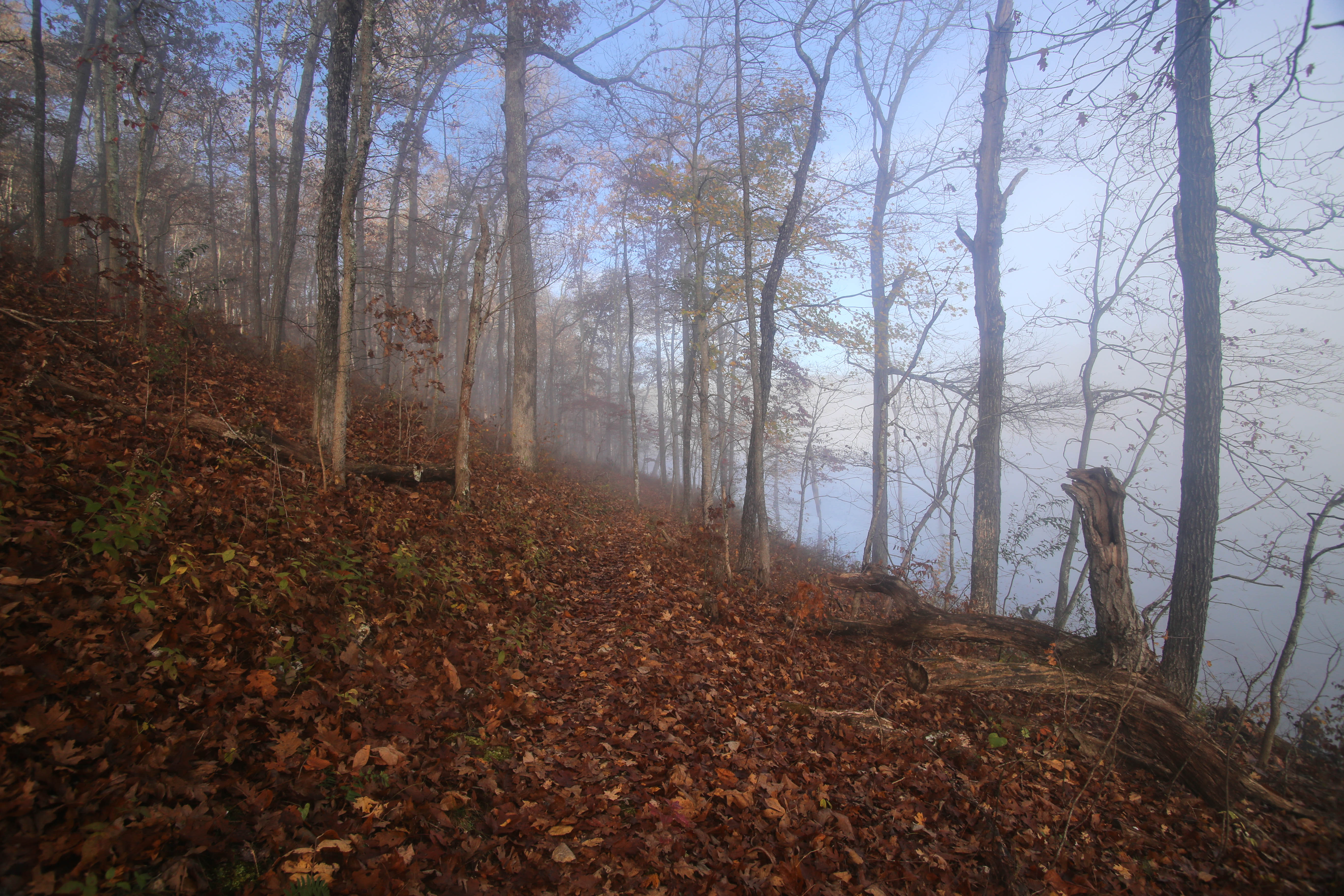
- Interactive map of Council Bluff Recreation Area
- Location: Iron / Washington counties, Missouri, USA
- Nearest city: Belgrade, Missouri, Caledonia, Missouri, Viburnum, Missouri
- Coordinates: 37.72°N 90.91°W
- Area: 10,860 acres (43.9 km^{2})
- Governing body: USDA-Forest Service
- Website: www.fs.usda.gov/recarea/mtnf/recarea/?recid=21844

Council Bluff Recreation Area surrounds the lake. The recreation area is 10,860 acres. Funds were first allocated for the site in 1967. The campground, called Wild Boar Campground, was opened in 1985. There are also boat ramps available for use. There is a sandy, 54,000 square foot beach called Chapel Hill Beach that is at the eastern part of the campground. There is a 12-mile trail called Council Bluff Trail (also known as Lake Shore Trail) that encircles the lake and is connected to the campground. Camping, picnicking, hiking, fishing, waterfowl hunting, swimming, canoeing, and boating are some activities available. Mountain biking is also available on the trail. Boats must operate at no-wake speeds. The lake has redear sunfish, bluegill, largemouth bass, and channel catfish that are available for fishing.

The recreation area is close in proximity to Bell Mountain Wilderness.

== See also ==
- List of lakes of Missouri
