= Pere Marquette State Park =

State park in Jersey County, Illinois

- IUCN category III (natural monument or feature)
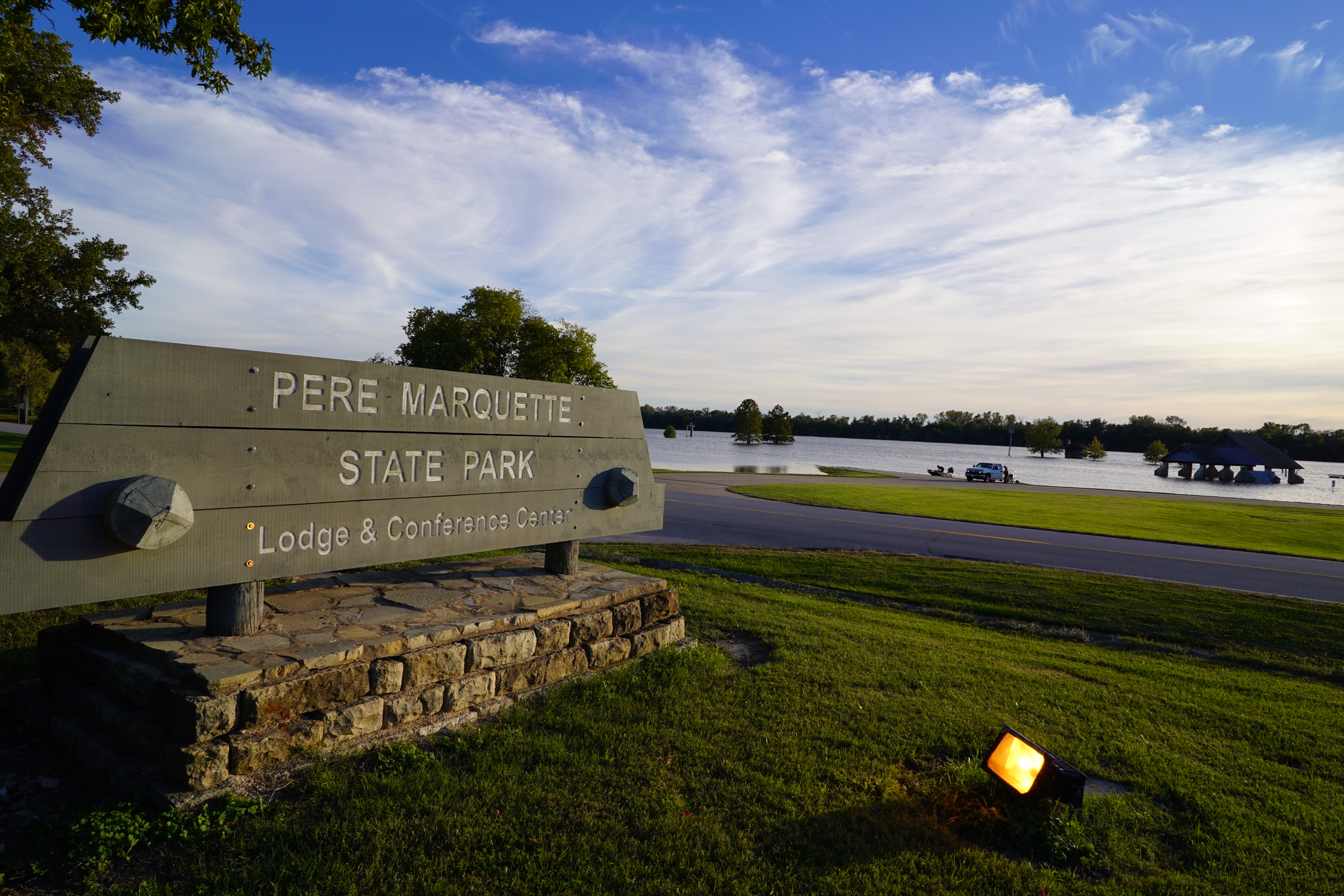

- Location within Illinois Location within the United States
- Location: Jersey County, Illinois, USA
- Nearest city: Grafton, Illinois
- Coordinates: 38°59′57″N 90°31′33″W
- Area: 8,050 acres (3,260 ha)
- Established: 1931
- Governing body: Illinois Department of Natural Resources
- Pere Marquette State Park Lodge and Cabins
- U.S. National Register of Historic Places
- Location: Box 158, Grafton, Illinois
- Area: 16 acres (6.5 ha)
- Architect: Booten, Joseph F.
- MPS: Illinois State Parks Lodges and Cabins TR
- NRHP reference No.: 85002405
- Added to NRHP: March 4, 1985

Pere Marquette State Park is an 8,050-acre (3,260 ha) protected area in southwestern Jersey County, Illinois, United States. It is located near the city of Grafton, Illinois, at the confluence of the Mississippi River and the Illinois River. The park is located on Illinois Route 100, which at this location is also part of both the Great River Road and the Meeting of the Great Rivers Scenic Byway. The park is operated and maintained by the Illinois Department of Natural Resources. The park is also part of the Confluence Greenway and is at the northwestern end of the 21.5-mile (34.6 km) Sam Vadalabene Bike Trail.

== History of park ==
The park was named in honor of Father (Père) Jacques Marquette, a Jesuit priest who was the co-leader, with his comrade Louis Jolliet, of a 1673 voyage of exploration on the Mississippi River. Marquette was the first European to map the mouth of the Illinois River, which he and Joliet used to return from the Mississippi to the Great Lakes.

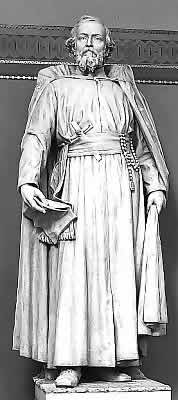
Pere Marquette, National Statuary Hall

At the mouth of the Illinois River, the explorers found one of the richest and most densely settled regions of North America, fully utilized by Native Americans of the Illini Confederacy. Large catches of fish, shellfish, and waterbirds were yielded from the rivers and adjacent wetlands. On top of the river bluffs, fertile windblown loess and topsoil could be used to grow corn, beans, and squash.

During the years since 1673, many changes have taken place to this region. The beds of mussels and other shellfish have dwindled, harmed by over-harvesting and possible disease. Invasive fish, such as Asian carp, have swum into the rivers and have partially replaced native species such as largemouth bass, bluegill, catfish, and crappie.

One signature Pere Marquette State Park species, the American bald eagle, has made a remarkable comeback that started in the 1990s. Hundreds of eagles that nest in the wetland areas to the north congregate in and around the park areas in late winter to catch and eat fish during the cold months.

In the late 1950s through 1968 the area just north of the Lover's Leap lookout area was the site of an active Project Nike missile site, constructed for the defense of St. Louis during the Cold War.

== Amenities and activities ==
Pere Marquette State Park was founded in 1931 as the Piasa Bluffs State Park, but was soon renamed. The park's heart is a Civilian Conservation Corps-built lodge, first built in the 1930s and later expanded in 1985 to contain 72 rooms. A visitor center, with exhibits on local ecology and history, opened in 1997. The lodge and surrounding cabins were listed on the National Register of Historic Places in 1985. In celebration of the 2018 Illinois Bicentennial, Pere Marquette Lodge was selected as one of the Illinois 200 Great Places by the American Institute of Architects Illinois component (AIA Illinois).

The park contains approximately 12 miles (19 km) of marked trails. Approximately 230 species of bird have been logged in the park, and a horseback riding stable operates during the warmer months. There is also a 2,000-acre (810 ha) public hunting area for deer, squirrel, wild turkey, and other target species. The Illinois River lies adjacent to the western and southern boundaries of the park. There are also several launching ramps for private boats to enter the Illinois and Mississippi Rivers.

The park includes a faulted geologic anticline, an upward arching of stratified rock dated to crustal movement circa 200 million years BP. The feature is related to the Lincoln Anticline of northeast Missouri.
