= Lake Killarney (Missouri) =

- Location within Missouri Location within the United States
- Location: Iron County, Missouri
- Coordinates: 37°35′34″N 90°34′15″W
- Type: reservoir
- Basin countries: United States
- Surface elevation: 807 ft (246 m)

Lake Killarney is a reservoir in Iron County in the U.S. state of Missouri.

Lake Killarney takes its name from the Lakes of Killarney, in Ireland.

== See also ==
- List of lakes in Missouri
