= Silver Lake (Missouri) =

- Location within Missouri
- Location: Stone County, Missouri
- Coordinates: 36°57′50″N 93°24′48″W
- Type: lake
- Basin countries: United States
- Surface elevation: 1,099 ft (335 m)

Silver Lake is a lake in the U.S. state of Missouri.

Silver Lake was named on account of its pure water.

== See also ==
- List of lakes in Missouri
