= Long Branch State Park =

State park in Missouri, United States

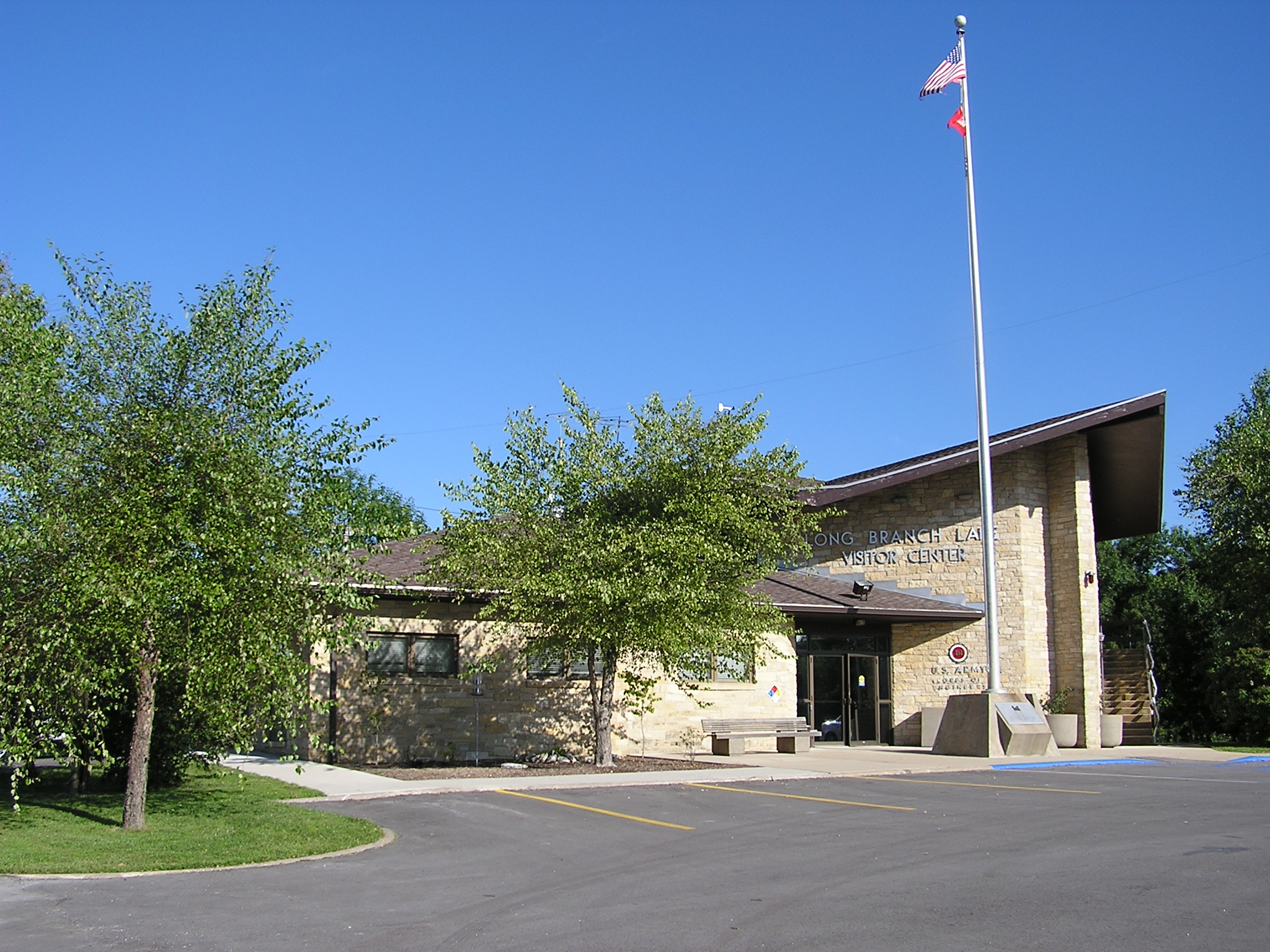
- Long Branch Lake Visitor Center

- Location within Missouri Location within the United States
- Location: Macon County, Missouri, United States
- Coordinates: 39°46′18″N 92°31′46″W
- Area: 1,828.47 acres (739.96 ha)
- Elevation: 791 ft (241 m)
- Established: 1983
- Administrator: Missouri Department of Natural Resources
- Visitors: 434,919 (in 2023)
- Website: Official website

Long Branch State Park is a public recreation area occupying 1,828 acres (740 ha) adjacent to the Long Branch Reservoir in Macon County, Missouri. The state park consists of three units located some two miles west of Macon, Missouri on U.S. Highway 36.

== History ==
Flooding along the Little Chariton River was an ongoing problem for the residents of Macon County and elsewhere in northeast Missouri since the area was first settled in the 1830s. Extensive channelization of the main Chariton River by private entities, local governments, and the U.S. Army Corps of Engineers, while alleviating flooding issues in some areas, exacerbated them for others. Long Branch Dam was authorized by Congress in 1965 as a multi-purpose project for water supply, flood control, recreation, downstream water quality and fish/wildlife management. Construction began in 1973 and the dam began operating in 1980.

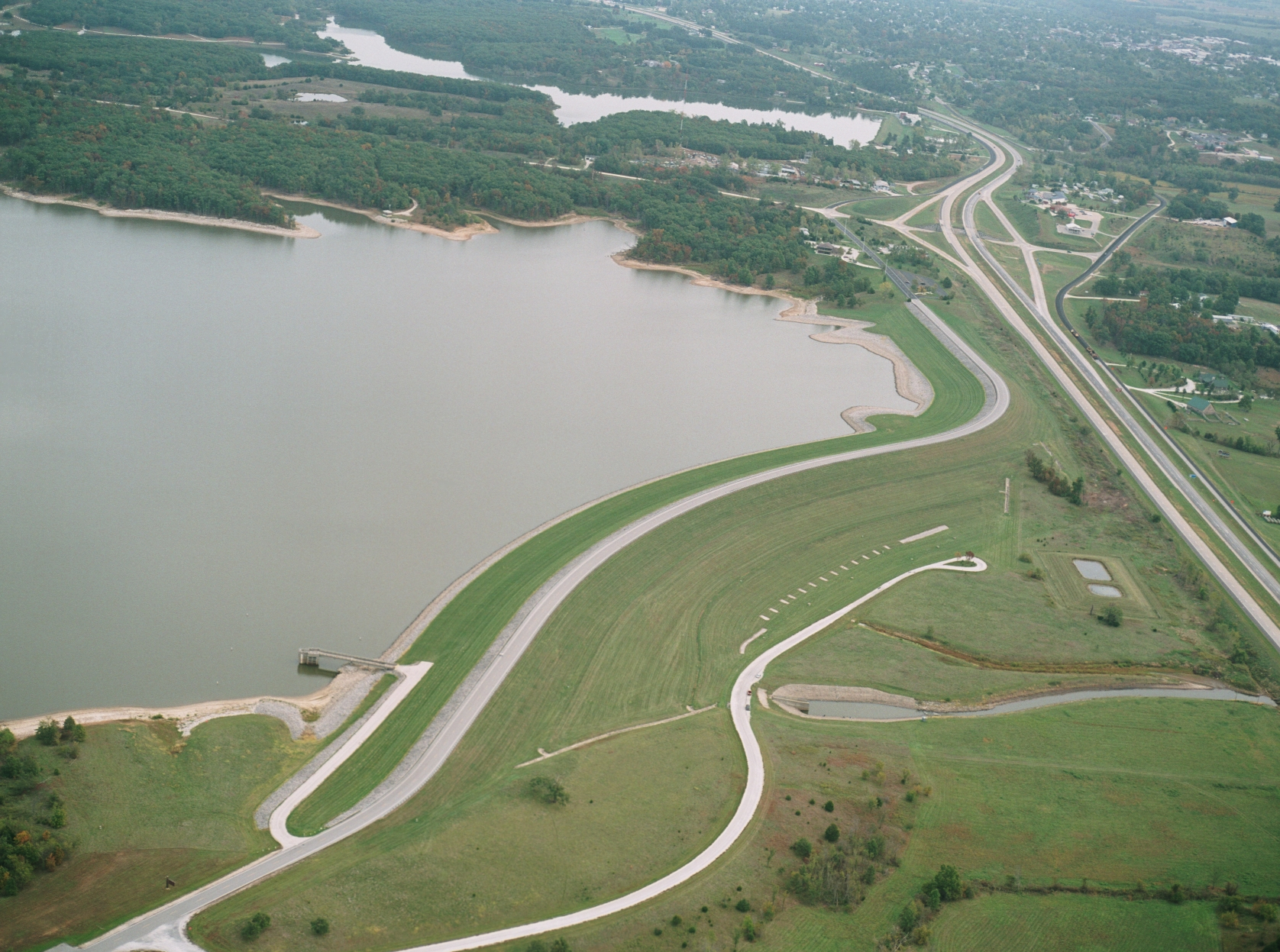
Aerial view of Long Branch Lake and dam. Macon City Lake is the smaller body of water in the background.

Long Branch Lake is the reservoir created by the dam, with about 24 miles of shoreline and a flood-control capacity of 98,000 acre-feet. In addition to the adjacent state-run state park, the dam has a visitors center at its southern end, and the Atlanta State Wildlife Area at its northern end near Atlanta, Missouri.

Long Branch State Park was created by the Missouri Department of Natural Resources in 1983 after reaching a long term lease agreement with the Corps of Engineers for use of the land.

== Activities and Amenities ==
The state park features a wide variety of outdoor activities including boating, swimming, water skiing, fishing, hiking trails, picnicking facilities, three boat ramps, marina, and camping area. The large public acreage surrounding the lake provide opportunities for viewing white-tailed deer, wild turkey, and migratory waterfowl.
