= Wing Lake =

- Location within Missouri Location within the United States
- Location: Washington County, Missouri
- Coordinates: 37°44′27″N 90°40′35″W
- Type: reservoir
- Basin countries: United States
- Surface elevation: 988 ft (301 m)

Wing Lake is a reservoir in Washington County in the U.S. state of Missouri.

Wing Lake was so named on account of its outline having the form of a wing.
