= Hoosier Creek (Missouri) =

Stream in the American state of Missouri

Coordinates: 38°17′11″N 90°58′56″W

Hoosier Creek is a stream in Franklin County in the U.S. state of Missouri. It is a tributary of the Meramec River.

Hoosier Creek most likely was named for the fact a share of the first settlers were natives of Indiana ("Hoosiers").

== See also ==
- List of rivers of Missouri
