= Lake St. Clair, Missouri =

- Census-designated place
- Location within Missouri Location within the United States
- Coordinates: 38°19′21″N 90°59′55″W
- Country: United States
- State: Missouri
- County: Franklin
- Township: Central

Area
  - Total: 0.84 sq mi (2.17 km^{2})
  - Land: 0.72 sq mi (1.87 km^{2})
  - Water: 0.12 sq mi (0.30 km^{2})
- Elevation: 705 ft (215 m)

Population (2020)
  - Total: 825
  - Density: 1,140/sq mi (440.1/km^{2})
- Time zone: UTC-6 (Central (CST))
  - Summer (DST): UTC-5 (CDT)
- ZIP Code: 63077 (Saint Clair)
- Area code: 636
- FIPS code: 29-40039
- GNIS feature ID: 2806400

Lake St. Clair or Lake Saint Clair is an unincorporated community and census-designated place (CDP) in Franklin County, Missouri, United States. It is in the southeast part of the county, surrounding a lake impounded on a tributary of Hoosier Creek, a south-flowing tributary of the Meramec River. The community is bordered to the north by the city of Saint Clair and is 54 miles (87 km) southwest of St. Louis.

Lake St. Clair was first listed as a CDP prior to the 2020 census.

== Demographics ==
Historical population
Census	Pop.	Note	%±
2020	825		—
U.S. Decennial Census

Lake St. Clair first appeared as a census designated place in the 2020 U.S. census.

== Education ==
It is in the St. Clair R-XIII School District.
