= Whitefish Chain of Lakes =

Reservoir in Minnesota

The Whitefish Chain of Lakes is a reservoir found in the heart of Minnesota ("Land of 10,000 lakes"), United States. Its 14 lakes span 14,272 acres through the cities of Crosslake, Pequot Lakes, Jenkins, and Pine River.

== Origin of name ==
The Whitefish Chain was named for the many whitefish that were swimming within it. Although, there is a more unique way as to how the Chain attained its name. There were two main American Indian Tribes who inhabited and fought over the area. These two tribes were the Dakota and Ojibwe. The American Indian Tribes named different locations and trappers created maps of the area and surrounding waters. The natives named the Chain "Kadikumagokag," which was translated to "Lake Where There are Many Whitefish" by Joseph Nicollet, a French astronomer who emigrated to the United States.

== Geography ==
The 14 lakes consist of Upper Whitefish Lake, Lower Whitefish Lake, Cross Lake, Big Trout Lake, Rush-Hen Lake, Lower Hay Lake, Little Pine Lake, Bertha Lake, Arrowhead Lake, Daggett Lake, Clamshell Lake, Pig Lake, Island Lake, and Loon Lake.

Lake Name	Area (acres)	Shore length (miles)	Maximum depth (feet)
Whitefish	7714.19	32.2	138
Cross	1815	21.85	84
Big Trout	1366.29	8.88	128
Rush-Hen	857.83	14.77	105
Lower Hay	700.21	4.44	100
Bertha	336.87	3.85	64
Little Pine	329.86	6.2	36
Arrowhead	296.37	4.09	13
Daggett	258.27	7.52	23
Island	332.4	5.17	76
Clamshell	211.06	6.49	42
Pig	195.78	2.16	56
Loon	237	5	69

== History ==
=== Logging ===
Logging was significant in the development of the Whitefish Chain of Lakes and made it the tourist destination that it is today. Loggers would cut down trees in the surrounding areas and drag them to the Chain or the Pine River. Before the logs could be sent downstream, they would have to build a temporary dam to build up the water supply which was then released once the logs were lined up. The logs would then be sent to a local sawmill or further downstream to where the Pine River meets the Mississippi River where a sawmill was once located. It wasn't until the late 1800s that a permanent dam was built on Crosslake which eventually created the Chain as it is known today. There are several buildings from the 1800s and 1900s that have been restored and can be found at the Crosslake Historical Society.

== Ecology ==
=== Invasive species ===
Zebra mussels have worked their way into the chain.

=== Flora and fauna ===
There are various plant species found throughout the Whitefish Chain. Some of the unique plants to the Chain include Flat-leaved bladderwort, Lesser bladderwort, Humped bladderwort, Water bulrush, Creeping spearwort, Wild calla, Cottongrass sedge, and Bog rosemary. There are also several species of birds, frogs, fish, and other vertebrates.
