= Butterfly Lake =

- Location within Missouri Location within the United States
- Location: Ste. Genevieve County, Missouri
- Coordinates: 37°47′32″N 90°14′57″W
- Type: reservoir
- Basin countries: United States
- Surface area: 65 acres (26 ha)
- Surface elevation: 764 ft (233 m)

Butterfly Lake is a reservoir in Ste. Genevieve County in the U.S. state of Missouri.

Butterfly Lake was so named because its outline has the shape of a butterfly. The reservoir is 65 acres in area.
