= Hartford, Illinois =

- Village
- Location in Madison County, Illinois
- Coordinates: 38°49′06″N 90°05′29″W
- Country: United States
- State: Illinois
- County: Madison
- Townships: Chouteau, Wood River

Area
  - Total: 5.44 sq mi (14.08 km^{2})
  - Land: 5.17 sq mi (13.38 km^{2})
  - Water: 0.27 sq mi (0.70 km^{2})
- Elevation: 430 ft (130 m)

Population (2020)
  - Total: 1,185
  - Density: 229.4/sq mi (88.57/km^{2})
- Time zone: UTC-6 (CST)
  - Summer (DST): UTC-5 (CDT)
- ZIP code: 62048
- Area code: 618
- FIPS code: 17-33279
- GNIS feature ID: 2398258
- Website: hartfordillinois.net

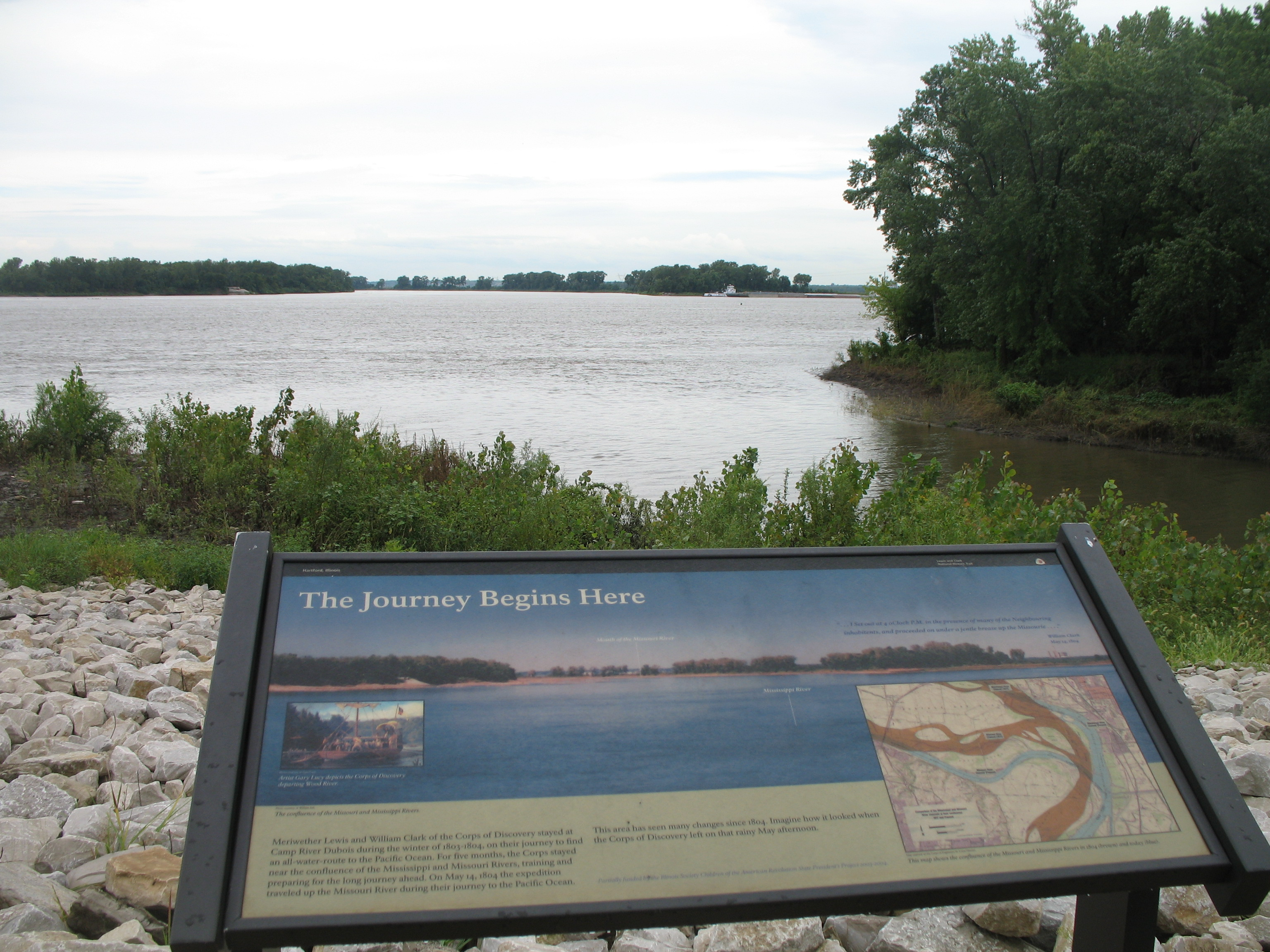
Camp Dubois where Lewis and Clark spent the winter before beginning their famous expedition

Hartford is a village in Madison County, Illinois, United States, on the Mississippi River near the mouth of the Missouri River. The population was 1,185 at the 2020 census, down from 1,429 in 2010. Lewis and Clark spent the winter of 1803-04 there, near what has been designated the Lewis and Clark State Historic Site.

== History ==
=== Underground gas plume ===
Numerous oil refineries have occupied the area for many years. An estimated 4 million gallons of gasoline have seeped into the ground under Hartford. The village filed suit on July 21, 2008, against multiple parties over the underground gas plume.

=== Chemetco, Inc ===
The copper smelter Chemetco operated nearby for around 30 years, ending in 2001. The corporation was found guilty of Clean Water Act offenses after its sustained pollution of Long Lake, a tributary of the Mississippi River, over a ten-year period. This ended following the detection by EPA inspectors of a secret hazardous waste pipe in September 1996. The location, just south of Hartford near the community of Mitchell, was listed as a Superfund priority cleanup site March 4, 2010.

== Geography ==
Hartford is located in western Madison County approximately 15 miles (24 km) north of downtown St. Louis, Missouri It is bordered to the west by the Mississippi River, across which are St. Charles County and St. Louis County, Missouri. The Missouri River joins the Mississippi across from the southwest corner of the village, about 1 mile (1.6 km) southwest of the village center. The Lewis and Clark State Historic Site is within the village limits, directly across from the Missouri River confluence.

Hartford is bordered to the north by the city of Wood River, to the east by the village of South Roxana, and to the south by Granite City. Illinois Route 3 passes through the west side of the village, leading northwest 7 miles (11 km) to Alton and south 17 miles (27 km) to East St. Louis. Illinois Route 111 runs along the eastern border of Hartford, leading north 2 miles (3 km) to the center of Wood River and south 13 miles (21 km) to Fairmont City.

According to the U.S. Census Bureau, Hartford has a total area of 5.44 square miles (14.09 km^{2}), of which 5.17 square miles (13.39 km^{2}) are land and 0.27 square miles (0.70 km^{2}), or 4.97%, are water. The Cahokia Creek Diversion Channel passes through the southern part of the village limits, reaching the Mississippi River at the Lewis and Clark Historic Site.

== Demographics ==
Historical population
Census	Pop.	Note	%±
1930	1,566		—
1940	1,842		17.6%
1950	1,909		3.6%
1960	2,355		23.4%
1970	2,243		−4.8%
1980	1,887		−15.9%
1990	1,676		−11.2%
2000	1,545		−7.8%
2010	1,429		−7.5%
2020	1,185		−17.1%
U.S. Decennial Census

=== 2020 census ===
As of the 2020 census, Hartford had a population of 1,185. The median age was 42.3 years. 20.6% of residents were under the age of 18 and 19.1% of residents were 65 years of age or older. For every 100 females there were 98.8 males, and for every 100 females age 18 and over there were 100.2 males age 18 and over.

98.8% of residents lived in urban areas, while 1.2% lived in rural areas.

There were 529 households in Hartford, of which 26.3% had children under the age of 18 living in them. Of all households, 38.0% were married-couple households, 20.8% were households with a male householder and no spouse or partner present, and 30.2% were households with a female householder and no spouse or partner present. About 32.7% of all households were made up of individuals and 13.2% had someone living alone who was 65 years of age or older.

There were 582 housing units, of which 9.1% were vacant. The homeowner vacancy rate was 2.3% and the rental vacancy rate was 4.7%.

Racial composition as of the 2020 census
Race	Number	Percent
White	1,094	92.3%
Black or African American	15	1.3%
American Indian and Alaska Native	5	0.4%
Asian	9	0.8%
Native Hawaiian and Other Pacific Islander	0	0.0%
Some other race	2	0.2%
Two or more races	60	5.1%
Hispanic or Latino (of any race)	24	2.0%

=== American Community Survey estimates ===
The American Community Survey's five-year estimates for 2020 to 2024 put Hartford's median household income at $41,092 and its per capita income at $28,003; about 20.7% of residents had income below the poverty line.

=== 2000 census ===
As of the census of 2000, there were 1,545 people, 650 households, and 434 families residing in the village. The population density was 396.4 inhabitants per square mile (153.1/km^{2}). There were 710 housing units at an average density of 182.1 per square mile (70.3/km^{2}). The racial makeup of the village was 98.45% White, 0.13% African American, 0.19% Native American, 0.32% Asian, 0.06% Pacific Islander, 0.32% from other races, and 0.52% from two or more races. Hispanic or Latino of any race were 0.71% of the population.

There were 650 households, of which 27.8% had children under the age of 18 living with them, 52.9% were married couples living together, 11.1% had a female householder with no husband present, and 33.1% were non-families. 28.5% of all households were made up of individuals, and 13.8% had someone living alone who was 65 years of age or older. The average household size was 2.38 and the average family size was 2.89.

In the village, the population was spread out, with 23.3% under the age of 18, 7.5% from 18 to 24, 28.9% from 25 to 44, 23.6% from 45 to 64, and 16.8% who were 65 years of age or older. The median age was 39 years. For every 100 females, there were 101.4 males. For every 100 females age 18 and over, there were 94.6 males.

The median income for a household in the village was $33,828, and the median income for a family was $40,652. Males had a median income of $31,694 versus $20,156 for females. The per capita income for the village was $16,160. About 10.3% of families and 13.0% of the population were below the poverty line, including 20.8% of those under age 18 and 4.6% of those age 65 or over.

== Landmarks and culture ==
The Lewis and Clark State Historic Site interprets Camp Dubois, the winter camp where the Corps of Discovery stayed from December 1803 to May 1804 before departing up the Missouri River on May 14, 1804; it displays a full-scale replica of the expedition's keelboat.

Also in the village, the Lewis and Clark Confluence Tower has observation decks at 50, 100, and 150 feet and opened in 2010 to mark the bicentennial of the expedition's departure; it overlooks the confluence of the Mississippi and Missouri rivers.

== Education ==
Hartford is served by Wood River-Hartford Elementary School District 15 for pre-kindergarten through grade 8 and by East Alton-Wood River Community High School District 14 for grades 9 through 12. The elementary district operates Hartford Elementary School in the village.

== Notable person ==
Hartford is the birthplace of actor Clint Walker, known for the television series Cheyenne and for the movies The Ten Commandments and The Dirty Dozen.

== See also ==
- Hartford Castle
