= Lock and Dam No. 26 (historical) =

Former dam in Illinois, U.S.

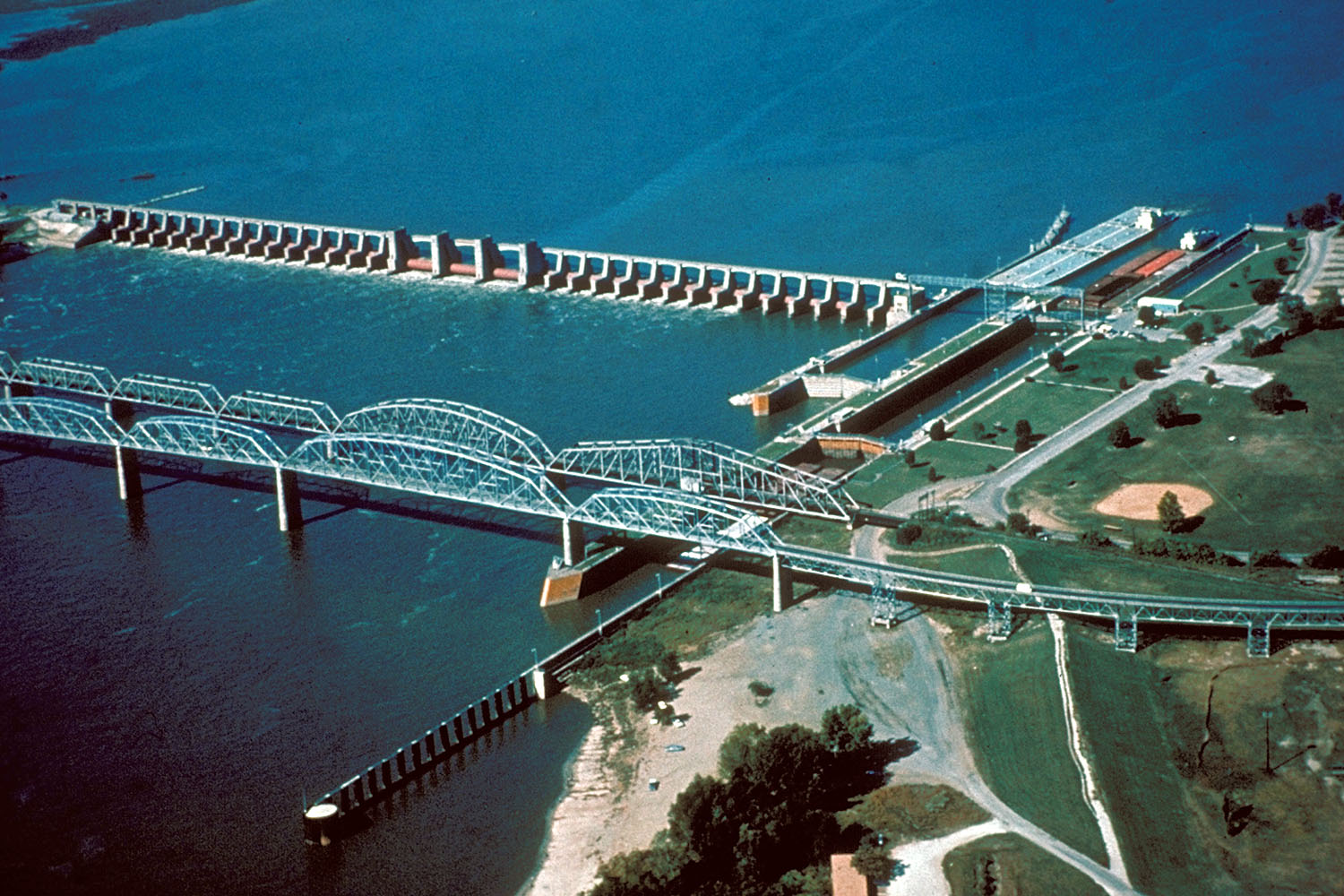
- Old Lock and Dam 26 and the Old Clark Bridge with a swing span rail bridge in between.
- Interactive map of Lock and Dam No. 26
- Country: USA
- Location: Alton, Illinois
- Coordinates: 38°53′10″N 90°10′55″W
- Purpose: River navigation and channel depth maintenance
- Status: Decommissioned
- Construction began: 1939
- Demolition date: 1990
- Built by: Engineering Construction Corporation,-- composed of Spencer, White and Prentis, George A. Fuller Company, and Turner Construction Company, all of New York City

Dam and spillways
- Type of dam: Three steel roller gates and thirty Tainter gates, all of the submergible type, with concrete sills and separating piers
- Impounds: Upper Mississippi River
- Length: 1,724 ft (525 m)

Reservoir
- Maximum length: 38.5 miles

Lock 26
- Interactive map of Lock 26
- 38°53′10″N 90°10′55″W
- Waterway: Mississippi River
- First built: 1938
- Length: 600 feet (180 m) main, 360 feet (110 m) auxiliary lock
- Width: 110 feet (34 m) main, 110 feet (34 m) auxiliary
- Fall: 25 feet (7.6 m)
- Above sea level: 419 feet MSL of upper pool

Lock and Dam No. 26 was a lock and dam located near Alton, Illinois on the Upper Mississippi River around river mile 202.5.

Opened in 1938, its largest lock was 600 feet long. It was demolished in 1990 and replaced by the Melvin Price Locks and Dam, which is also known as Lock and Dam number 26.

== Background ==
On December 29, 1933, John Griffiths and Son Company of Chicago, Illinois, won the contact with a bid of $3,269,565.00, the lowest of five bids received on construction of the locks. Work officially started on January 13, 1934. Due to adverse river conditions, John Griffiths and Son Company gave up the contract in April 1936 with about a third of the work completed.

Engineering Construction Corporation, formed by Spencer, White and Prentis, George A. Fuller Company, and Turner Construction Company, all of New York City, bid $1,200,000 to complete the locks. This company also won with a bid of $4,856,716.80 to construct the dam. The contract was awarded on May 14, 1935 and work officially began on June 15, 1935.

"The twin locks, as designed, comprise a main lock basin 600 feet (180 m) long by 110 feet (34 m) wide, with 45-foot gates, and an auxiliary look basin 360 feet (110 m) long 110 feet (34 m) wide with 27-foot gates upstream. This lock width is standard in all locks being constructed in this series, and is the same as that of the Panama Canal Locks." Page 19.

== See also ==
- Old Clark Bridge
