= Lake Claire =

Lake Claire may refer to:

- Lake Claire (Alberta), a lake in Canada
- Lake Claire, Atlanta, a neighborhood in Georgia, United States
