= Lewis and Clark State Historic Site =

Historic site in Illinois

Coordinates: 38.8023°N 90.1021°W

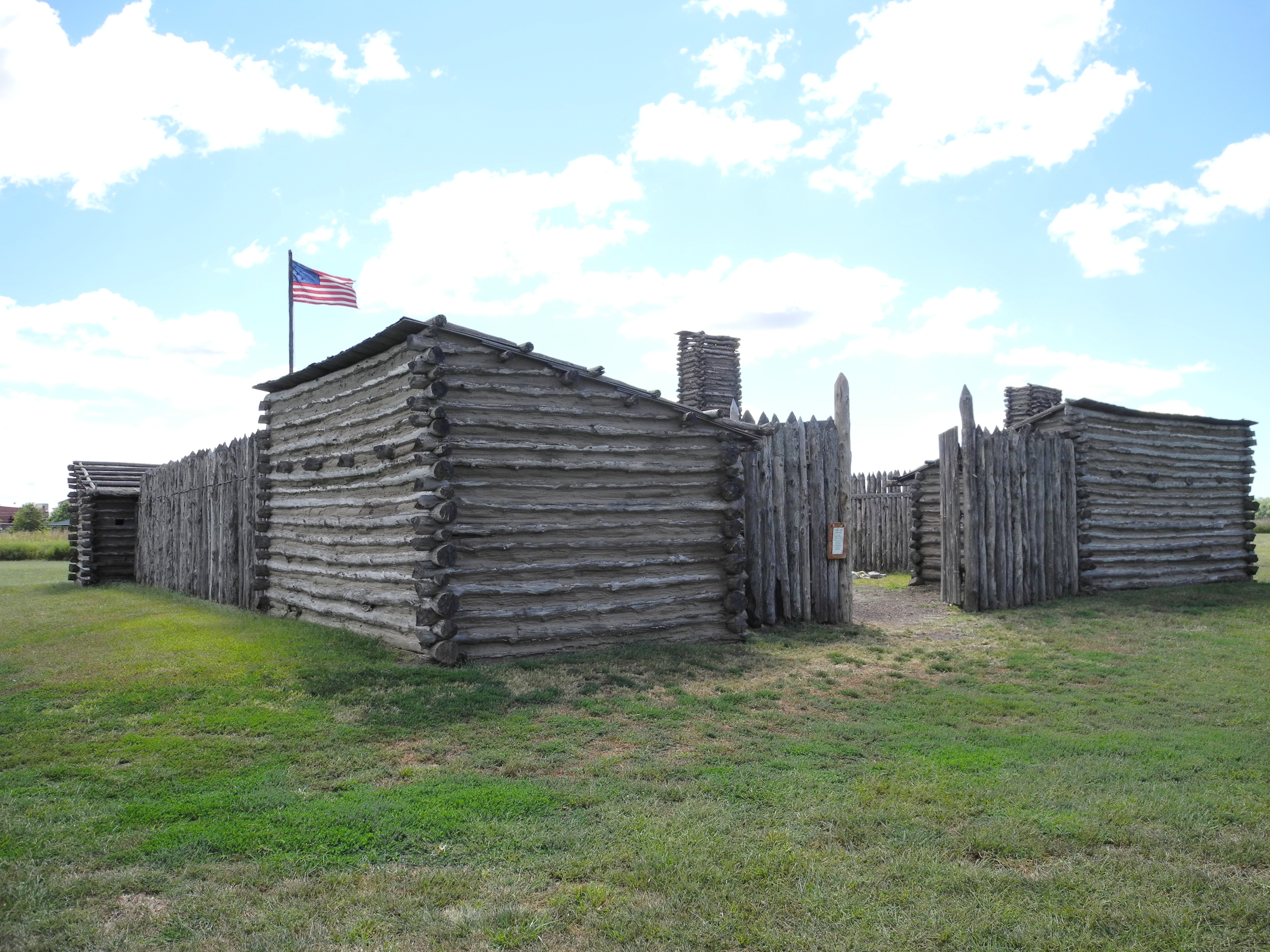
- A reconstruction of Camp Dubois is on the grounds of the historic site.
- Interactive map of Lewis and Clark State Historic Site

Illinois State Historic Site

The Lewis and Clark State Historic Site opened in 2002 and is owned and operated by the Illinois Department of Natural Resources Division of Historic Preservation (formerly Illinois Historic Preservation Agency). The site, located in Hartford, Illinois, commemorates Camp River Dubois, the camp of the Lewis and Clark Expedition from December 1803 to May 1804. The site is National Trail Site #1 on the Lewis and Clark National Historic Trail and is located directly off the Confluence Bike Trail, part of the Confluence Greenway. The site is at the southern end of the Meeting of the Great Rivers Scenic Route.

The Lewis and Clark State Historic Site is situated on the dry side of the Chain of Rocks Levee, approximately 0.25 miles (0.40 km) from the Illinois shore of the Mississippi River. It is also known as Lewis and Clark State Park.

The site includes a 14,000-square-foot (1,300 m^{2}) interpretive center and an outdoor replica of Camp River Dubois. The interpretive center contains a theater, multiple hands-on exhibits and displays, and a 55-foot (17 m) full-scale cutaway keelboat.
