= Wildwood Lake (Jackson County, Missouri) =

- Location within Missouri Location within the United States
- Location: Jackson County, Missouri, United States
- Coordinates: 38°59′48″N 94°27′07″W
- Type: reservoir
- Basin countries: United States

Wildwood Lake is a reservoir in Jackson County, in the U.S. state of Missouri. It is located one mile southeast of Raytown.
