= Spanish Lake (Missouri) =

- Location within Missouri Location within the United States
- Location: St. Louis County, Missouri
- Coordinates: 38°47′49″N 90°12′14″W
- Type: lake
- Basin countries: United States
- Surface elevation: 489 feet (149 m)

Spanish Lake is a lake located in unincorporated St. Louis County, Missouri in the U.S. state of Missouri.

Spanish Lake was named because the Spanish Governor Zénon Trudeau used it as a place of rest and retirement.
