= Lake Clare =

- Location within Missouri Location within the United States
- Location: Jackson County, Missouri
- Coordinates: 38°53′17″N 94°33′01″W
- Type: reservoir
- Basin countries: United States
- Surface elevation: 981 ft (299 m)

Lake Clare is a lake in Jackson County in the U.S. state of Missouri.

Lake Clare was named after Clara B. Bush, the wife of the original owner of the site.

Lake Clare used to host long-distance swimming races called the ‘Huntington Mile Swim’ from 1957 to 1986.
