= Fellows Lake =

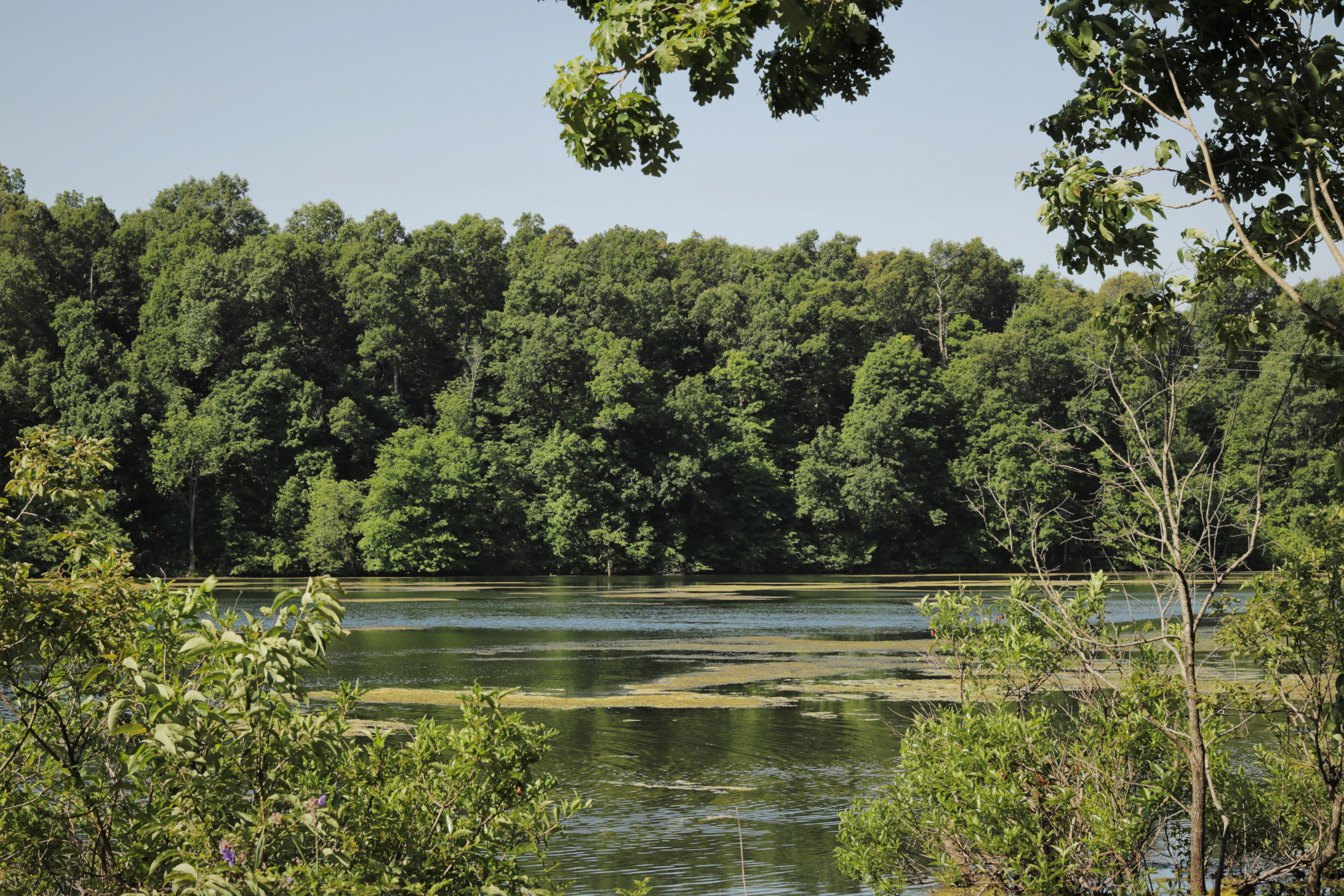
- Fellows Lake in Missouri

- Location within Missouri Location within the United States
- Location: Greene County, Missouri
- Coordinates: 37°18′54″N 093°13′49″W
- Type: reservoir
- Basin countries: United States
- Surface area: 860 acres (3.5 km^{2})
- Surface elevation: 1,260 ft (380 m)
- Islands: None
- Settlements: Springfield - 13.1 Miles Kansas City - 173.4 Miles

Fellows Lake is an 860-acre (3.5 km^{2}) source of water for the city of Springfield, Missouri. The lake was created by the impoundment of the Little Sac River behind the Fellows Lake Dam. The dam was originally constructed in 1955 and modified in 1991. The earthen and rock dam stands 102 feet (31 m) high. It is 1,500 feet (460 m) long at its crest and impounds a maximum capacity of 36,368 acre-feet (44,859,000 m^{3}). Fellows Lake is managed cooperatively by City Utilities of Springfield and the Missouri Department of Conservation.

The lake is also developing into one of the state's premier fisheries of Muskellunge. In 2016, the largest muskie sampled by the Missouri Department of Conservation in their annual fish survey was 46 inches long.

== Recreational activities ==
Due to its proximity to Springfield, Fellows Lake has an array of public areas for picnicking, barbecuing, and gathering places. The park surrounding the lake to the north houses one large pavilion on a large open grass area which is frequently used by kite-fliers. The lake also houses two major boat docks and one year-round marina for boat storage and kayak rental. A permit is required to launch a boat.

There is also a small 50-yard (46 m) remote control airplane field run by the Springfield RC Club one mile (1.6 km) north of the lake.

Sport fishing opportunities include largemouth bass, black and white crappie, catfish, walleye, muskie, and white bass. Sunfish, carp, and perch are frequently caught. Muskies are stocked yearly by the conservation department.

Fellows Lake is in the midst of installation of a multiple mile walking and biking trail now nearly complete and virtually circumferential with the exception of the southeast arm of the lake.

== Condition ==
The marina was inspected by city engineers and found that the metal bracing substructure was deteriorated and the 50 year old boat dock needs to be replaced. The City of Springfield intends to update the boat dock, build new campsites and a biking trail around the whole of the lake.
