= Long Branch Dam =

Dam in Missouri, U.S.

- Location of Long Branch Dam Long Branch Dam (the United States)
- Country: United States
- Location: Macon County Missouri
- Coordinates: 39°45′09″N 92°30′53″W
- Purpose: Flood control, Water storage
- Opening date: 1978
- Built by: United States Army Corps of Engineers

Dam and spillways
- Impounds: East Fork Little Chariton River
- Height: 71 ft (22 m)

Reservoir
- Creates: Long Branch Lake
- Total capacity: 98,000 acre⋅ft (121,000,000 m^{3})
- Normal elevation: 790 ft (240 m)

Long Branch Dam is a dam in Macon County in northern Missouri, about 80 miles (130 km) north of Columbia, Missouri.

The dam is a project of the United States Army Corps of Engineers to provide flood control, water storage, wildlife conservation, and recreation. Completed in 1978, the 71-foot (22 m) high earthen dam impounds the water of the East Fork of the Little Chariton River.

Long Branch Lake is the reservoir created by the dam, with about 24 miles (39 km) of shoreline and a flood-control capacity of 98,000 acre-feet (121,000,000 m^{3}). In addition to the adjacent state-run Long Branch State Park with three separate units, the dam has a visitor center at its southern end, and the Atlanta State Wildlife Area at its northern end.
