= Wildwood Lake (Jefferson County, Missouri) =

- Location within Missouri Location within the United States
- Location: Jefferson County, Missouri, United States
- Coordinates: 38°07′29″N 90°26′41″W
- Type: reservoir
- Basin countries: United States

Wildwood Lake is a reservoir in Jefferson County, in the U.S. state of Missouri.
