= Valley Water Mill Pond =

- Valley Water Mill Lake
- Location within Missouri Location within the United States
- Location: Missouri, United States
- Coordinates: 37°15′49″N 93°14′51″W
- Type: reservoir
- Basin countries: United States
- Surface area: 13 acres (5.3 ha)
- Max. depth: 14 ft (4.3 m)
- Surface elevation: 1,194 ft (364 m)
- References: U.S. Geological Survey Geographic Names Information System: Valley Water Mill Pond

Valley Water Mill Pond is a 13 acres (5.3 ha) reservoir located just north of Springfield, Missouri. It is managed under a joint operation between the Watershed Committee of the Ozarks and the Missouri Conservation Department. The reservoir is spring fed and has Secchi disk readings of over 4 feet (1.2 m).

== Recreation ==
The reservoir is located in Valley Water Mill Park. The park has hiking trails, a conference center, and a picnic area. The reservoir has two fishing docks as well as bank access. Boating and swimming are not allowed. Fishing is allowed and common fish species that are present include largemouth bass, redear sunfish, bluegill, channel catfish, and black crappie.

== History ==
The original dam at Valley Water Mill was built in the 1850s, to hold water for the operation of McCracken Mill, a local grist mill. In 1957, the lake and land that became the park were purchased by the Springfield Green County parks department. In 2008, the lake and dam were re-constructed giving the reservoir a maximum depth of 14 feet (4.3 m). The reservoir was reopened to fishing in 2012.
