= Melvin Price Locks and Dam =

Dam in Illinois and Missouri, U.S.

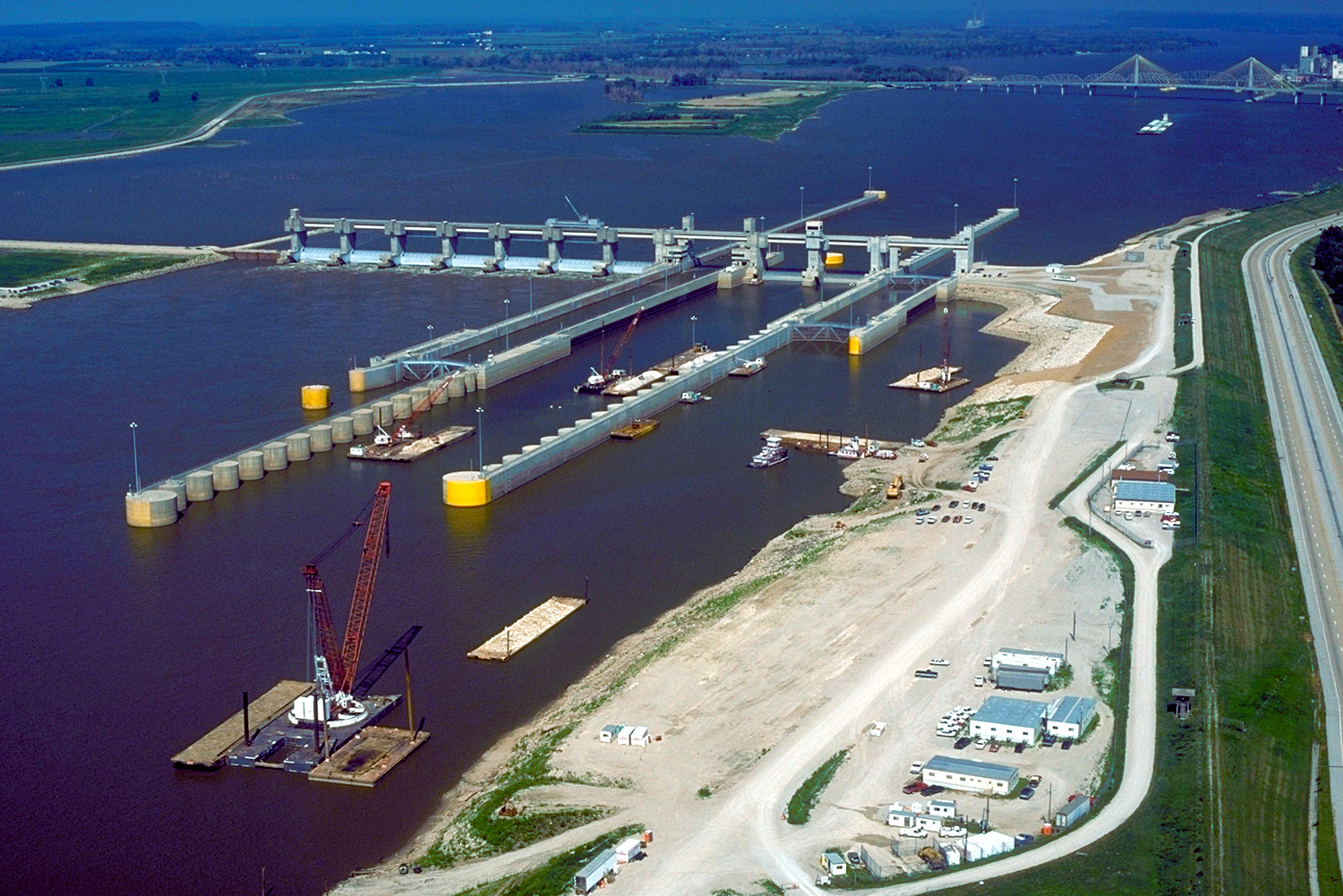
- Melvin Price Locks and Dam (Lock and Dam number 26)

- Location within Illinois
- Location: Alton, Illinois / West Alton, Missouri, USA
- Coordinates: 38°52′09″N 90°09′13″W
- Construction began: 1978
- Opening date: 1989
- Operators: U.S. Army Corps of Engineers, St. Louis District

Dam and spillways
- Impounds: Upper Mississippi River
- Length: 1,160 feet (353.6 m)

Reservoir
- Creates: Pool 26
- Total capacity: 238,000 acre⋅ft (0.294 km^{3})
- Catchment area: 171,470 mi^{2} (444,100 km^{2})

Lock 26
- Interactive map of Lock 26
- 38°52′09″N 90°09′13″W
- Waterway: Mississippi River
- First built: 1979
- Length: 1,200 feet (370 m) main, 600 feet (180 m) auxiliary lock
- Width: 110 feet (34 m) main, 110 feet (34 m) auxiliary

Melvin Price Locks and Dam is a dam and two locks at river mile 200.78 on the Upper Mississippi River, about 17 miles (27 km) north of Saint Louis, Missouri. The collocated National Great Rivers Museum, explains the structure and its engineering.

== Background ==
Construction began in 1979, the main lock opened in 1990, and the full structure was completed in 1994. It replaced the earlier Lock and Dam No. 26, demolished in 1990, and is the first replacement structure on the Upper Mississippi River nine-foot navigation project.

== Specifications ==
The main lock is 1,200 feet (370 m) long and 110 feet (34 m) wide; the auxiliary is 600 feet (180 m) long and 110 feet (34 m) wide. The main lock has a vertical lift gate and a miter gate while the aux. lock has two miter gates. The dam is 1,160 feet (350 m) long with 9 tainter gates, each 110 feet (34 m) wide by 42 feet (13 m) high.

The locks raise or lower vessels 15 feet (4.6 m).

It is named after Illinois Congressman Charles Melvin Price.

== Gallery ==
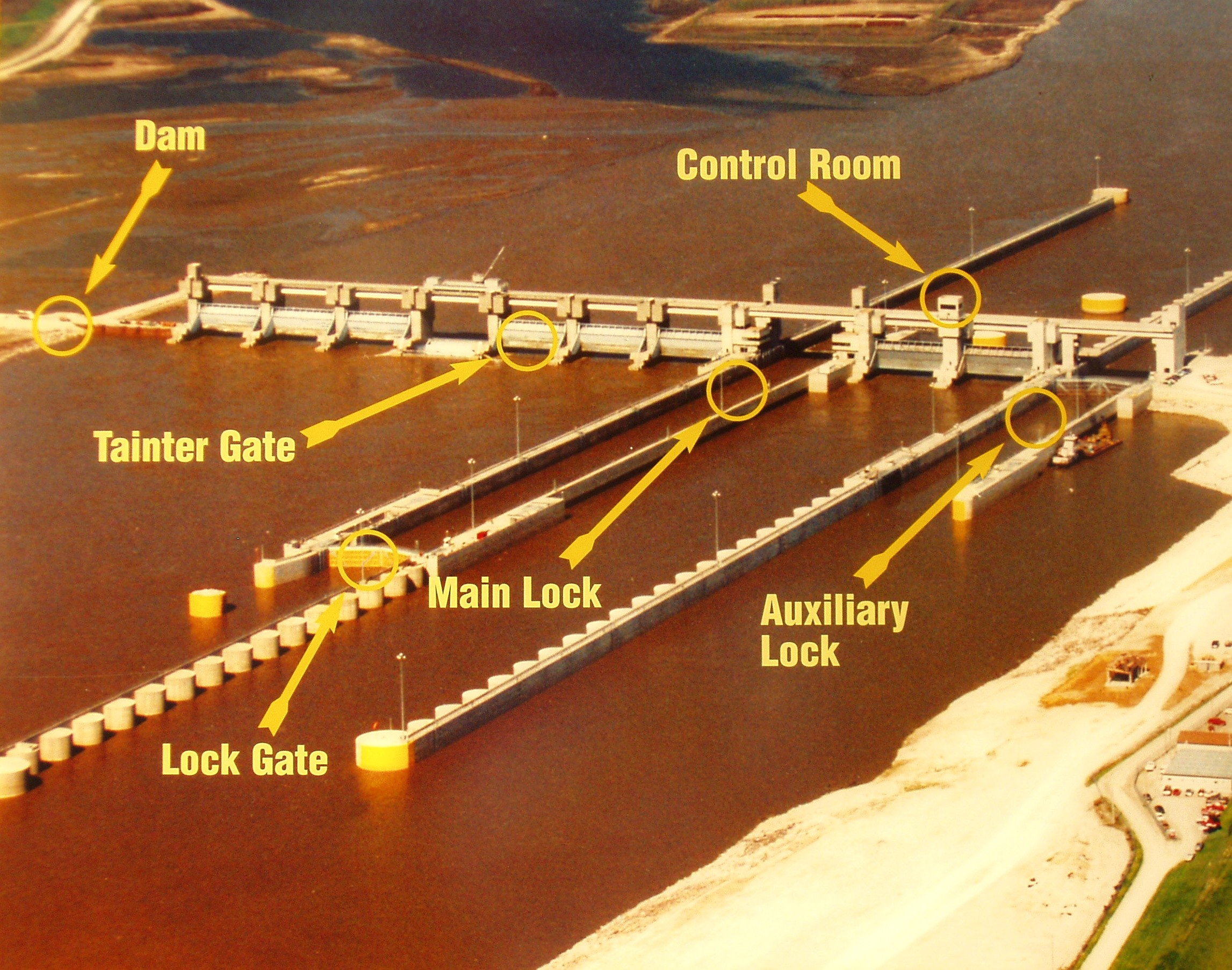
Annotated image of the lock and dam

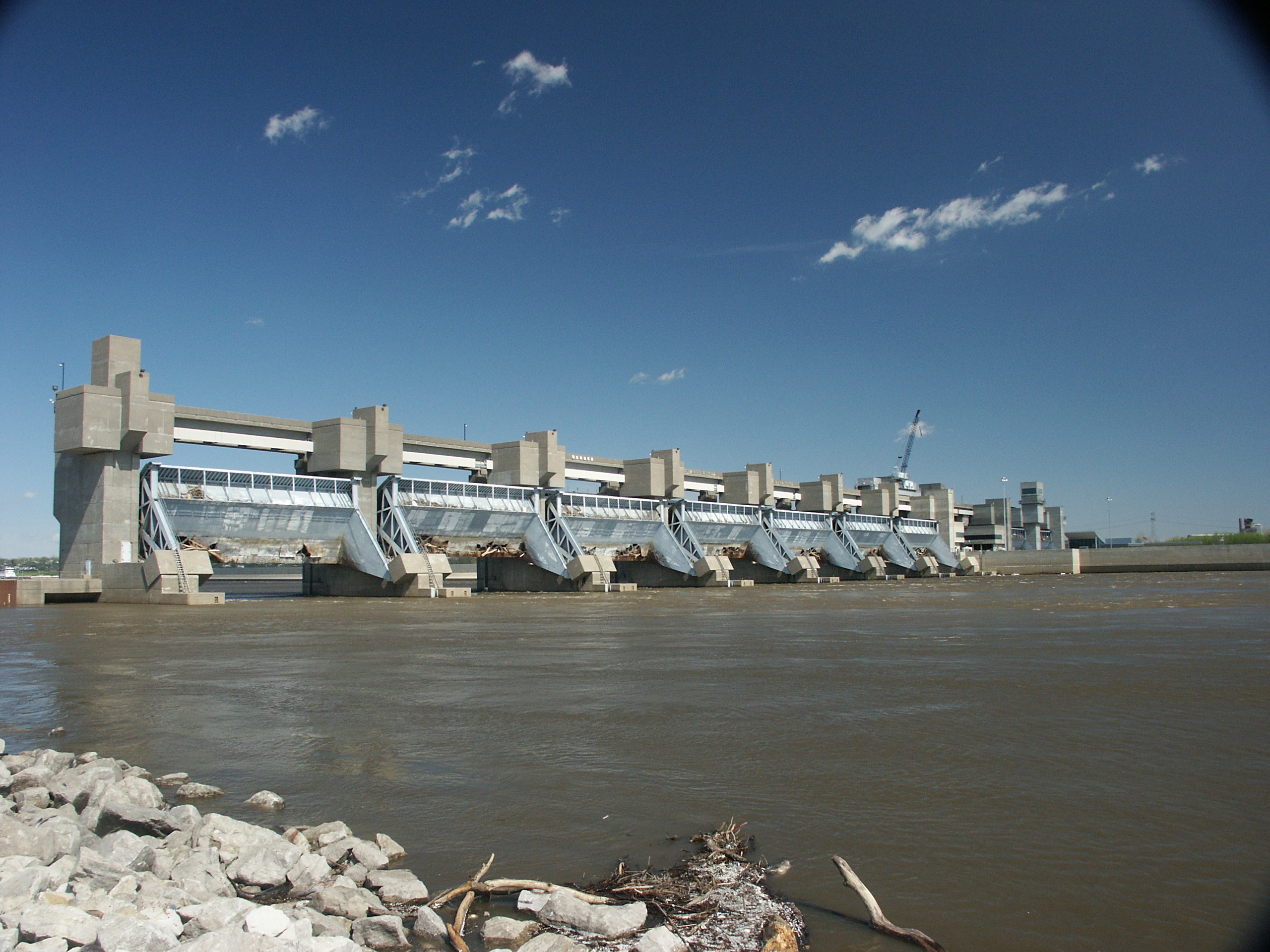
Dam and locks from Missouri shore

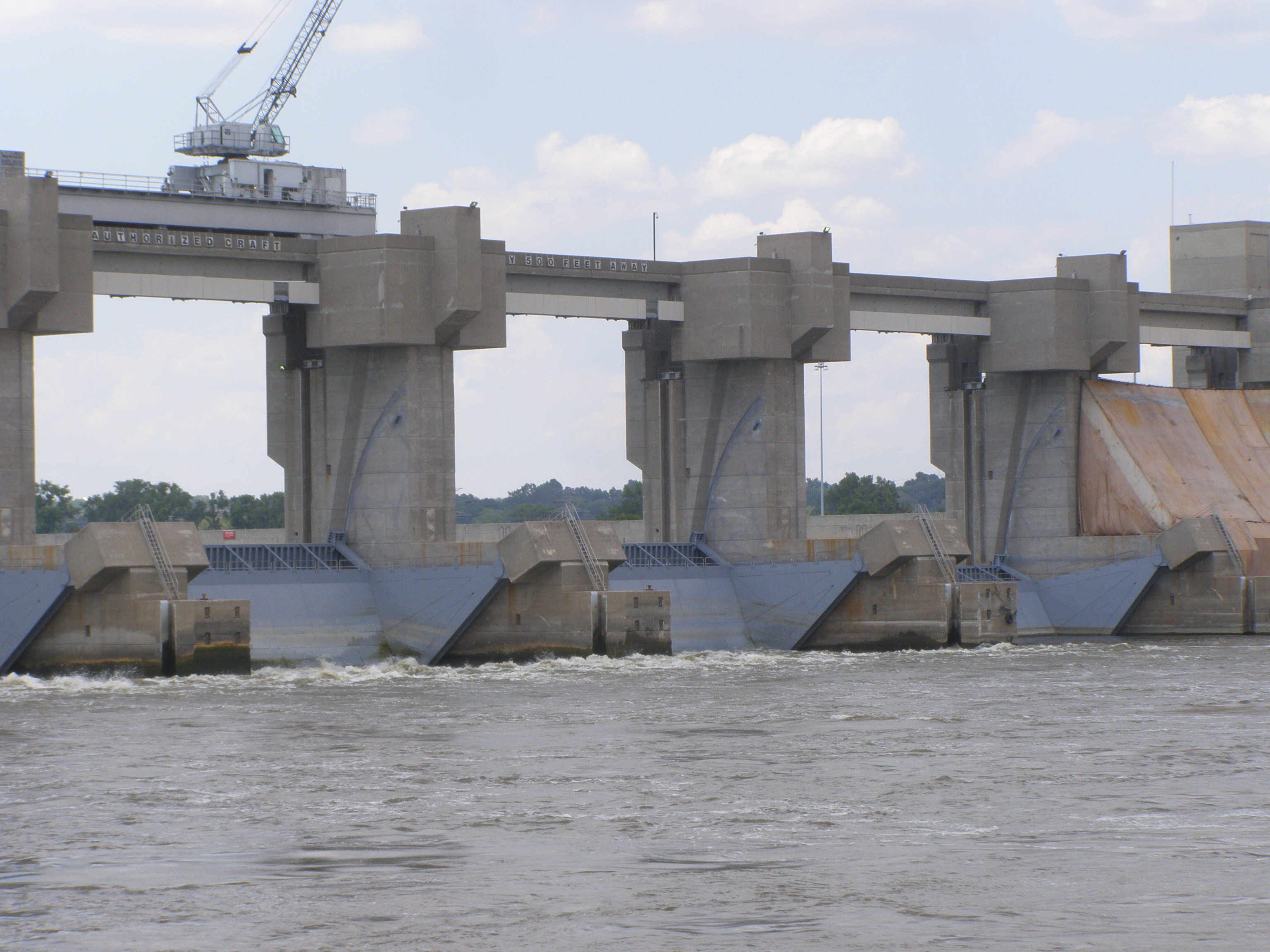
Close-up of the gates on the Melvin Price Lock & Dam

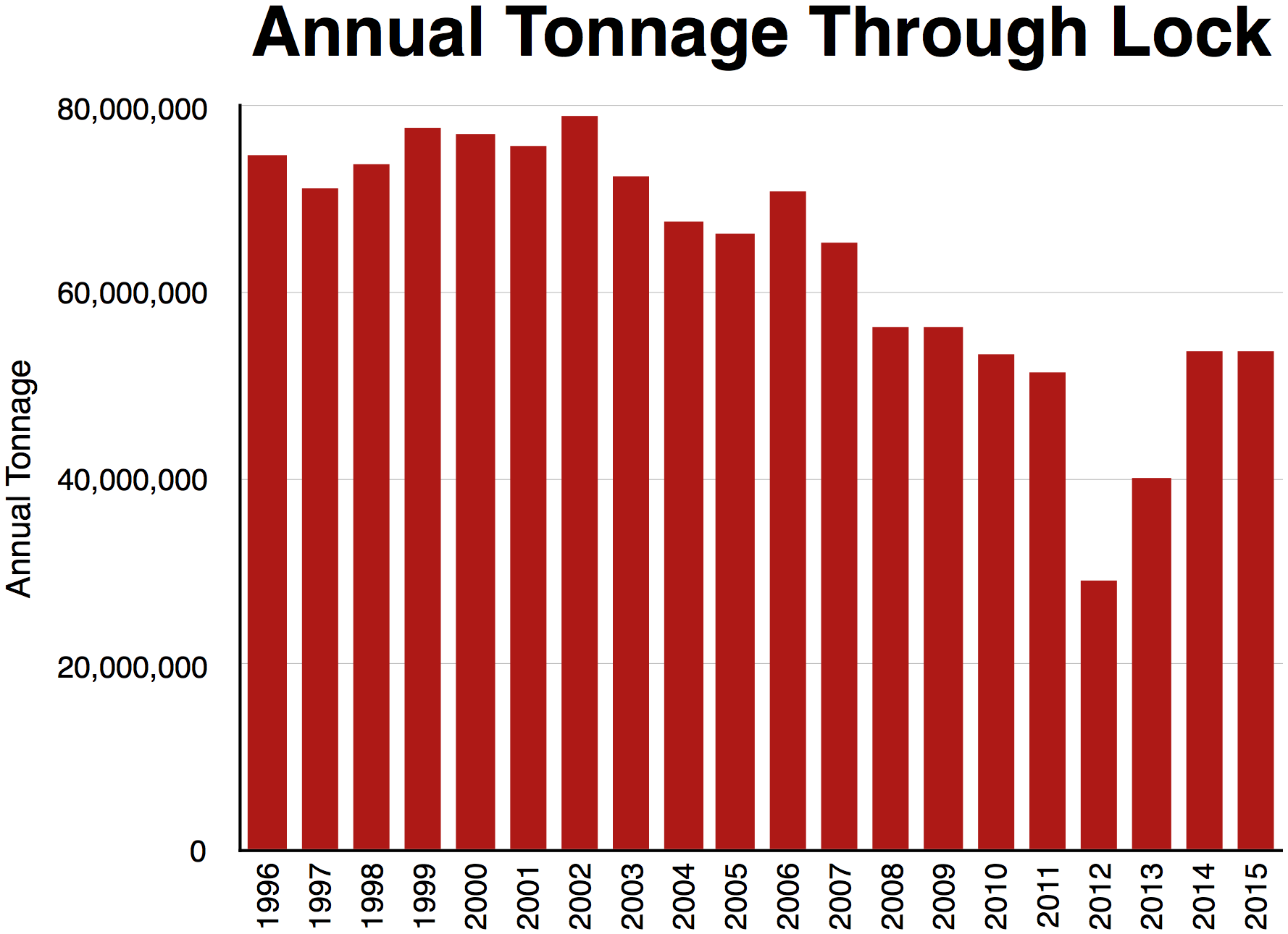
