= National Register of Historic Places listings in Jersey County, Illinois =

Location of Jersey County in Illinois

This is a list of the National Register of Historic Places listings in Jersey County, Illinois.

This is intended to be a complete list of the properties and districts on the National Register of Historic Places in Jersey County, Illinois, United States. Latitude and longitude coordinates are provided for many National Register properties and districts; these locations may be seen together in a map.

There are 21 properties and districts listed on the National Register in the county.

This National Park Service list is complete through NPS recent listings posted July 31, 2026.

== Current listings ==
	Name on the Register	Image	Date listed	Location	City or town	Description
1	Charles Brainerd House	Charles Brainerd House	February 5, 1998 (#98000065)	420 E. Main St. (Illinois Route 100); 38°58′19″N 90°25′45″W	Grafton	
2	Duncan Farm	Duncan Farm	August 24, 1982 (#82002542)	Southern side of Illinois Route 100, ½ mile west of Brussels Ferry; 38°58′05″N 90°30′49″W	Grafton	
3	Elsah Historic District	Elsah Historic District	July 27, 1973 (#73000706)	North of the McAdams Highway; 38°57′15″N 90°21′37″W	Elsah	
4	Fisher-Chapman Farmstead	Fisher-Chapman Farmstead	February 15, 2012 (#12000028)	24818 Homeridge Dr. 39°08′29″N 90°20′42″W	Jerseyville	
5	Col. William H. Fulkerson Farmstead	Col. William H. Fulkerson Farmstead	August 6, 1998 (#98000977)	1510 N. State St. (US Highway 67); 39°08′52″N 90°20′54″W	Jerseyville	
6	Grafton Bank	Grafton Bank	February 16, 1994 (#94000016)	225 E. Main St. (Illinois Route 100); 38°58′10″N 90°25′55″W	Grafton	
7	Grafton Boat Works		April 5, 2022 (#100007582)	400 Front St. 38°58′07″N 90°25′50″W	Grafton	
8	Grafton Historic District	Grafton Historic District	February 16, 1994 (#94000020)	105-225 and 24-214 W. Main St. (Illinois Route 100), and stone wharf at Maple St. 38°58′09″N 90°26′16″W	Grafton	
9	Hamilton Primary School	Hamilton Primary School	August 6, 1998 (#98000975)	200 ft. west of the intersection of Otterville and McClusky Rds. 39°03′04″N 90°23′50″W	Otterville	
10	Jersey County Courthouse	Jersey County Courthouse	May 8, 1986 (#86001008)	Courthouse Square (bordered by W. Pearl, N. Lafayette, W. Exchange, and N. Washington Streets); 39°07′08″N 90°19′44″W	Jerseyville	
11	Jerseyville Downtown Historic District	Jerseyville Downtown Historic District	December 29, 1986 (#86003528)	Roughly bounded by Spruce, N. Lafayette, Prairie, and N. Jefferson Streets; 39°07′07″N 90°19′41″W	Jerseyville	
12	Jerseyville First Presbyterian Church	Jerseyville First Presbyterian Church	February 17, 2021 (#100005968)	400 South State St. 39°07′00″N 90°19′33″W	Jerseyville	
13	Paris Mason Building	Paris Mason Building	February 16, 1994 (#94000017)	100 N. Springfield St. 38°58′17″N 90°27′01″W	Grafton	
14	John and Amelia McClintock House	John and Amelia McClintock House	February 16, 1994 (#94000019)	321 E. Main St. (Illinois Route 100); 38°58′11″N 90°25′49″W	Grafton	
15	New Piasa Chautauqua Historic District	New Piasa Chautauqua Historic District	June 15, 1982 (#82002541)	Off McAdams Parkway; 38°57′57″N 90°23′05″W	Chautauqua	
16	Nutwood Site		February 9, 1979 (#79003784)	Western side of Illinois Route 100, 500 feet south of the Narrows Creek bridge 39°04′54″N 90°33′23″W	Nutwood	
17	Pere Marquette State Park Lodge and Cabins	Pere Marquette State Park Lodge and Cabins	March 4, 1985 (#85002405)	Box 158; 38°58′18″N 90°32′28″W	Grafton	
18	Principia College Historic District	Principia College Historic District	April 19, 1993 (#93001605)	River Rd. 38°57′01″N 90°21′01″W	Elsah	
19	Ruebel Hotel	Ruebel Hotel	February 16, 1994 (#94000015)	207-215 E. Main St. (Illinois Route 100); 38°58′11″N 90°25′56″W	Grafton	
20	Slaten-LaMarsh House	Slaten-LaMarsh House	February 16, 1994 (#94000018)	25 E. Main St. (Illinois Route 100); 38°58′10″N 90°26′03″W	Grafton	
21	Smith-Duncan House and Eastman Barn	Smith-Duncan House and Eastman Barn	November 22, 1999 (#99001379)	Illinois Route 100 at Pere Marquette State Park, 2,000 feet (610 m) west of Deer Lick Hollow; 38°58′09″N 90°30′43″W	Grafton	

== See also ==
- List of National Historic Landmarks in Illinois
- National Register of Historic Places listings in Illinois
