= Duncan House =

Duncan House or Duncan Farm may refer to:

In Australia

- Duncan House (Castlecrag), a heritage-listed house in Sydney suburb of Castlerag

In the United States

(by state then city)

- Father William Duncan House, Metlakatla, AK, listed on the NRHP in Alaska
- Duncan House (Harrison, Arkansas), listed on the NRHP in Arkansas
- Hersey-Duncan House, Wilmington, DE, listed on the NRHP in Delaware
- Harry C. Duncan House, Tavarcs, FL, listed on the NRHP in Florida
- Horace Duncan House, Lake City, FL, listed on the NRHP in Florida
- Strange-Duncan House, Carnesville, GA, listed on the NRHP in Georgia
- Duncan Farm (Grafton, Illinois), listed on the NRHP in Illinois
- Smith-Duncan House and Eastman Barn, Grafton, IL, listed on the NRHP in Illinois
- Joseph Duncan House, Jacksonville, IL, listed on the NRHP in Illinois
- Duncan Manor, Towanda, IL, listed on the NRHP in Illinois
- Trippett-Glaze-Duncan Farm, Patoka, IN, listed on the NRHP in Indiana
- John M. Duncan House, Winterset, IA, listed on the NRHP in Iowa
- Duncan-Duitsman Farm Historic District, George, IA, listed on the NRHP in Iowa
- Charles Duncan House, Lawrence, KS, listed on the NRHP in Kansas
- Henry Duncan House, Bloomfield, KY, listed on the NRHP in Kentucky
- Bradshaw-Duncan House, Crestwood, KY, listed on the NRHP in Kentucky
- Duncan House (Franklin, Kentucky), listed on the NRHP in Simpson County, Kentucky
- Duncan House (Greenville, Kentucky), contributing building in South Cherry Street Historic District
- J. W. Duncan House, Nicholasville, KY, listed on the NRHP in Kentucky
- Stuart E. and Annie L. Duncan Estate, Louisville, KY, listed on the NRHP in Kentucky
- Duncan House (Springfield, Kentucky), listed on the NRHP in Washington County, Kentucky
- Beecher H. Duncan Farm, Westfield, ME, listed on the NRHP in Maine
- Duncan House, Beaufort, NC, listed on the NRHP in North Carolina
- Andrews-Duncan House, Raleigh, NC, listed on the NRHP in North Carolina
- Robert P. Duncan House, Bexley, OH, listed on the NRHP in Ohio
- Donald C. Duncan House, a Frank Lloyd Wright-designed house in Polymath Park in Acme, Pennsylvania
- Bishop William Wallace Duncan House, Spartanburg, SC, listed on the NRHP in South Carolina
- Wright-Henderson-Duncan House, Granbury, TX, listed on the NRHP in Texas
- Duncan, John, Harriet, and Eliza Jennett, House, Centerville, UT, listed on the NRHP in Utah
- Holland-Duncan House, Moneta, VA, listed on the NRHP in Virginia
