= Grafton Historic District =

Grafton Historic District may refer to:

- Grafton Historic District (Grafton, Illinois), listed on the National Register of Historic Places in Jersey County, Illinois
- Grafton Historic District (Rockville, Utah), listed on the National Register of Historic Places in Washington County, Utah
