= JCH =

JCH may refer to:

== Places ==
- Janet Clarke Hall, University of Melbourne, Australia
- Jersey Community Hospital, Illinois, US
- Edith and Carl Marks Jewish Community House of Bensonhurst, New York, US
- Jurong Community Hospital, Singapore
- James Cook railway station, England (by code)
- Qasigiannguit Heliport, Greenland (by IATA code)

== Other uses ==
- Jaynes–Cummings–Hubbard model, in quantum optics
- Journal of Contemporary History (since 1966)
