= Theodore S. Chapman =

American politician, lawyer, and businessman

Theodore Stillman Chapman (March 31, 1849–December 12, 1914) was an American politician, lawyer, and businessman.

Chapman was born in Becket, Massachusetts. He went to Colgate University and then taught school in LaPorte, Indiana. Eventually, he settled in Jerseyville, Illinois. He studied law in Jerseyville and was admitted to the Illinois bar in 1874. Chapman practiced law in Jerseyville and was president of the Jersey State Bank. Chapman served in the Illinois House of Representatives from 1885 to 1887 and was a Republican. He then served in the Illinois Senate from 1887 to 1891. He was appointed the first commissioner of the Illinois Pure Food Department Chapman died at St. Luke's Hospital in St. Louis, Missouri.
