= Fisher–Chapman Farmstead =

- U.S. National Register of Historic Places
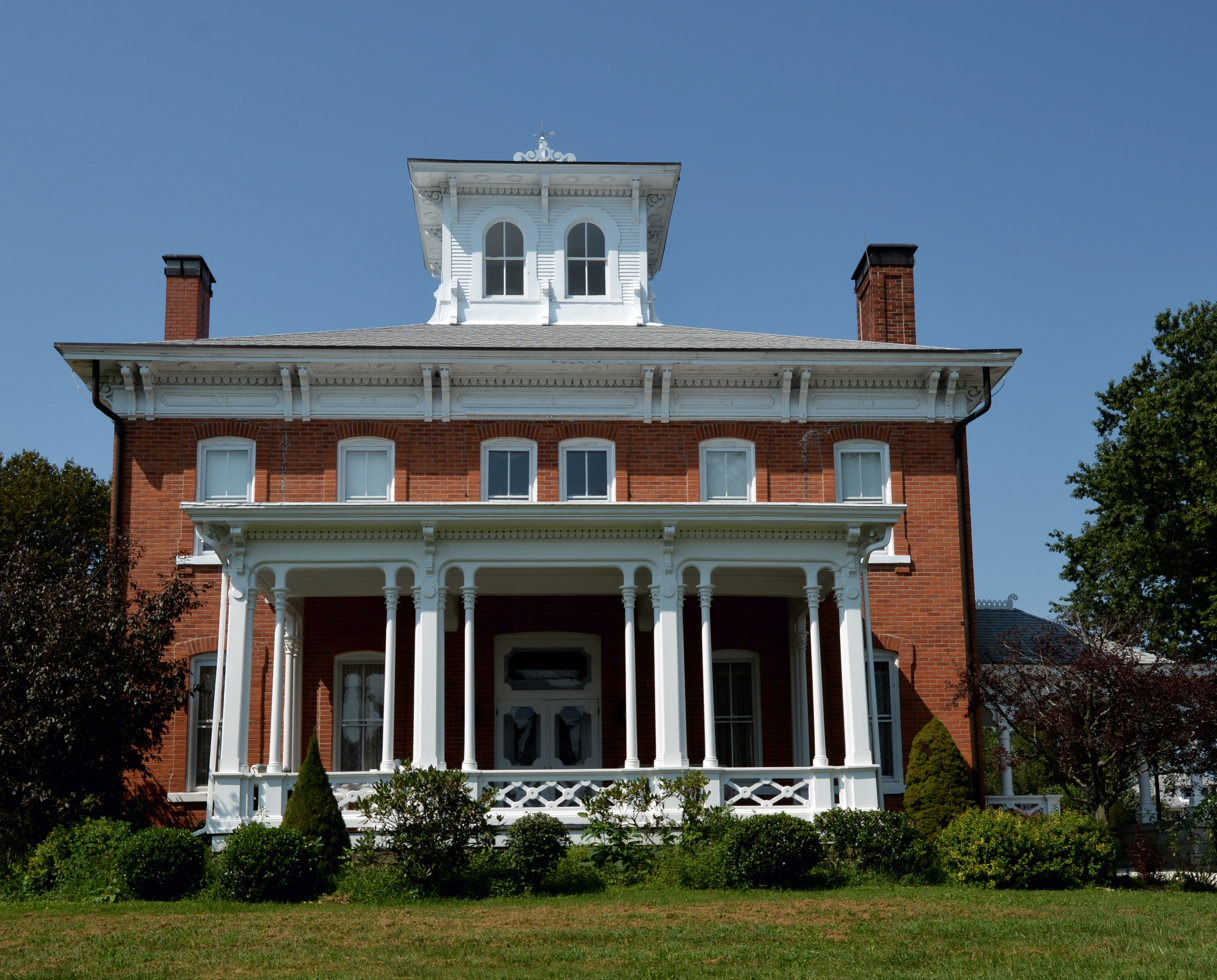

- Location within Illinois Location within the United States
- Location: 24818 Homeridge Dr., Jerseyville, Illinois
- Coordinates: 39°08′29″N 90°20′42″W
- Built: 1867
- Architectural style: Italianate
- NRHP reference No.: 12000028
- Added to NRHP: February 15, 2012

The Fisher–Chapman Farmstead is a historic farm located at 24818 Homeridge Dr. north of Jerseyville, Illinois. Cornelius B. Fisher, a New Jerseyan who began farming in Jersey County in 1838, established the farm and built its Italianate farmhouse in 1867. The farmhouse's characteristic Italianate features include its central belvedere, its hipped roof's wide eaves with paired brackets, and its tall, narrow windows with arched lintels. State senator Theodore S. Chapman purchased the farm in 1891 and renamed it Homeridge; the Chapman family ran the farm until 1960. The farm is a well-preserved representative of a working farm, and two of its contributing buildings once housed hired farm workers. In addition, the farm's production in the 20th century reflected statewide agricultural trends towards grain farming rather than livestock farming.

The farm was added to the National Register of Historic Places on February 15, 2012.
