= Jerseyville Downtown Historic District =

Historic district in Illinois, United States

- U.S. National Register of Historic Places
- U.S. Historic district
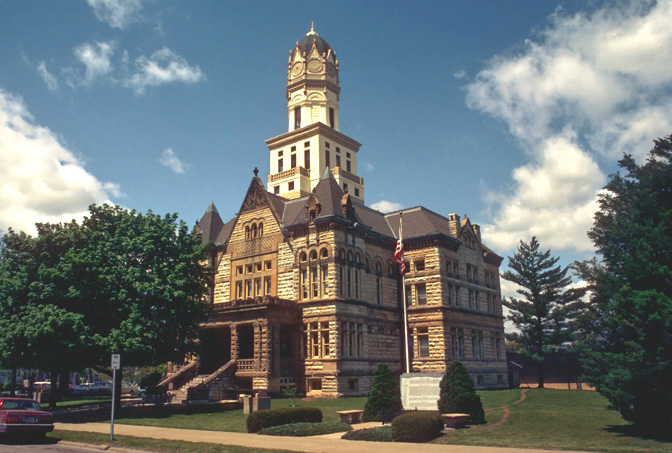
- The Jersey County Courthouse

- Location within Illinois Location within the United States
- Location: Roughly bounded by Exchange, Lafayette, Prairie and Jefferson Sts., Jerseyville, Illinois
- Coordinates: 39°7′7″N 90°19′41″W
- Area: 17.5 acres (7.1 ha)
- NRHP reference No.: 86003528
- Added to NRHP: December 29, 1986

The Jerseyville Downtown Historic District is a 17.5-acre (7.1 ha) historic district encompassing the commercial center of Jerseyville, Illinois. The district includes most of the city's historic commercial buildings, which were built along State Street (U.S. Route 67) and its cross streets from 1867 to 1929. The center of the district is at the intersection of State and Pearl Streets. The most prominent building in the district is the Jersey County Courthouse, a 124-foot (37.8 meter) tall limestone Romanesque Revival building built in 1893; unlike many other Illinois county seats, however, the district is not centered on the courthouse. The other buildings in the district are mainly one- and two-story brick Commercial style structures; other architectural influences in the district include Romanesque, Greek Revival, and Chateauesque. Other non-commercial buildings in the district include the Jerseyville Public Library, a Georgian style Carnegie library built in 1904, and the First Baptist Church, a Classical Revival church built in 1916.

The district was added to the National Register of Historic Places on December 29, 1986.
