= Jerseyville First Presbyterian Church =

Historic church in Illinois, United States

- U.S. National Register of Historic Places
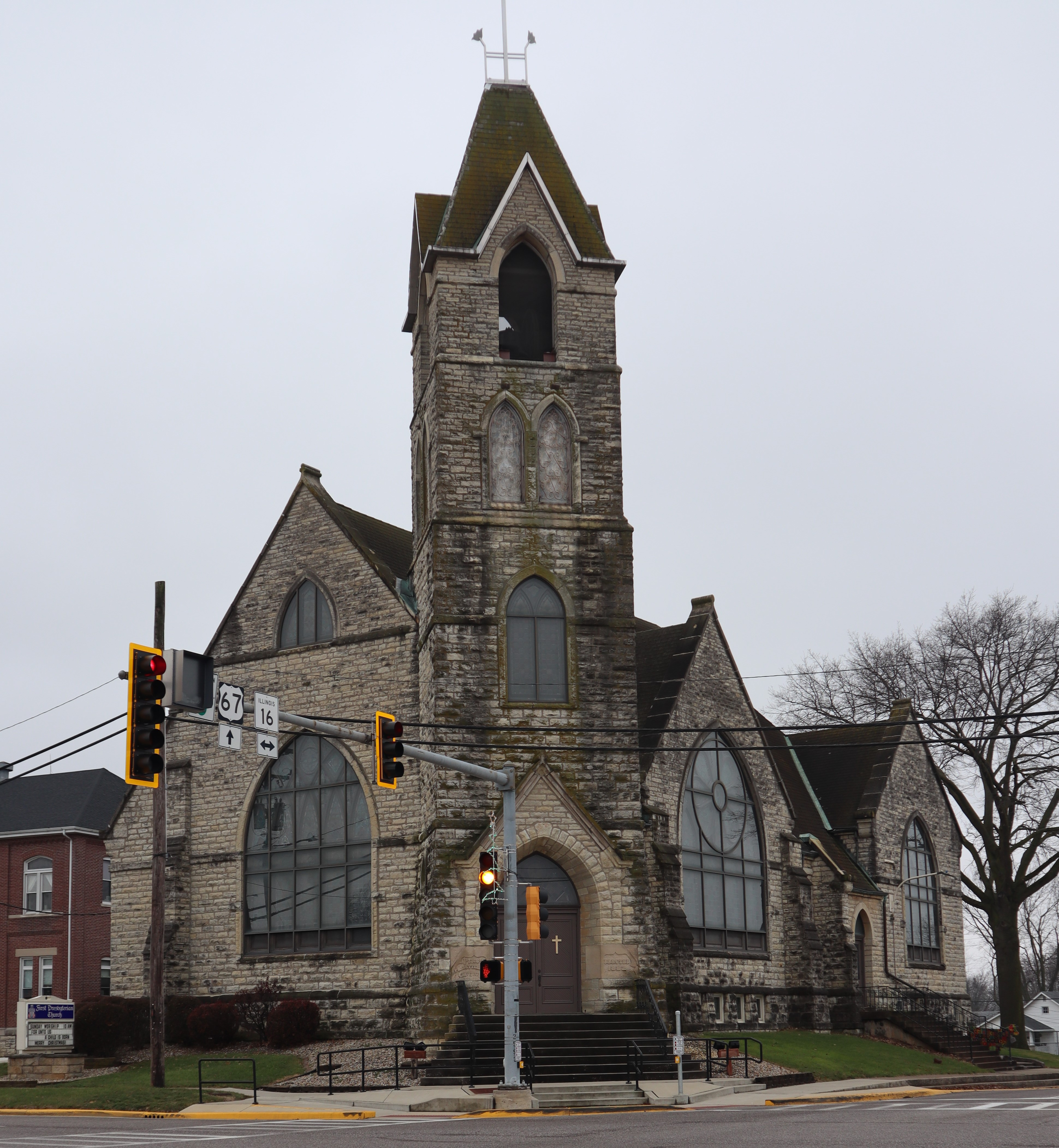

- Location within Illinois Location within the United States
- Location: 400 S. State St., Jerseyville, Illinois
- Coordinates: 39°07′00″N 90°19′33″W
- Built: 1882
- Architect: James Roland Willett
- Architectural style: High Victorian Gothic
- NRHP reference No.: 100005968
- Added to NRHP: February 17, 2021

The Jerseyville First Presbyterian Church is a historic Presbyterian church at 400 South State Street in Jerseyville, Illinois. The church was built in 1882 to replace Jerseyville's Presbyterian congregation's original church, which had been built on the same site in 1841. The congregation itself formed in 1834, making it the first church of any sort in the county. Architect James Roland Willett of Chicago designed the church in the High Victorian Gothic style, which was commonly used for rural religious buildings at the time. The church has a limestone exterior built with stone from nearby Grafton, and its design includes a corner bell tower with a steeple, pointed arch windows and doors, and a complex roof with a front-facing gable.

The church was added to the National Register of Historic Places on February 17, 2021.
