= Charles Brainerd House =

Historic house in Illinois, United States

- U.S. National Register of Historic Places
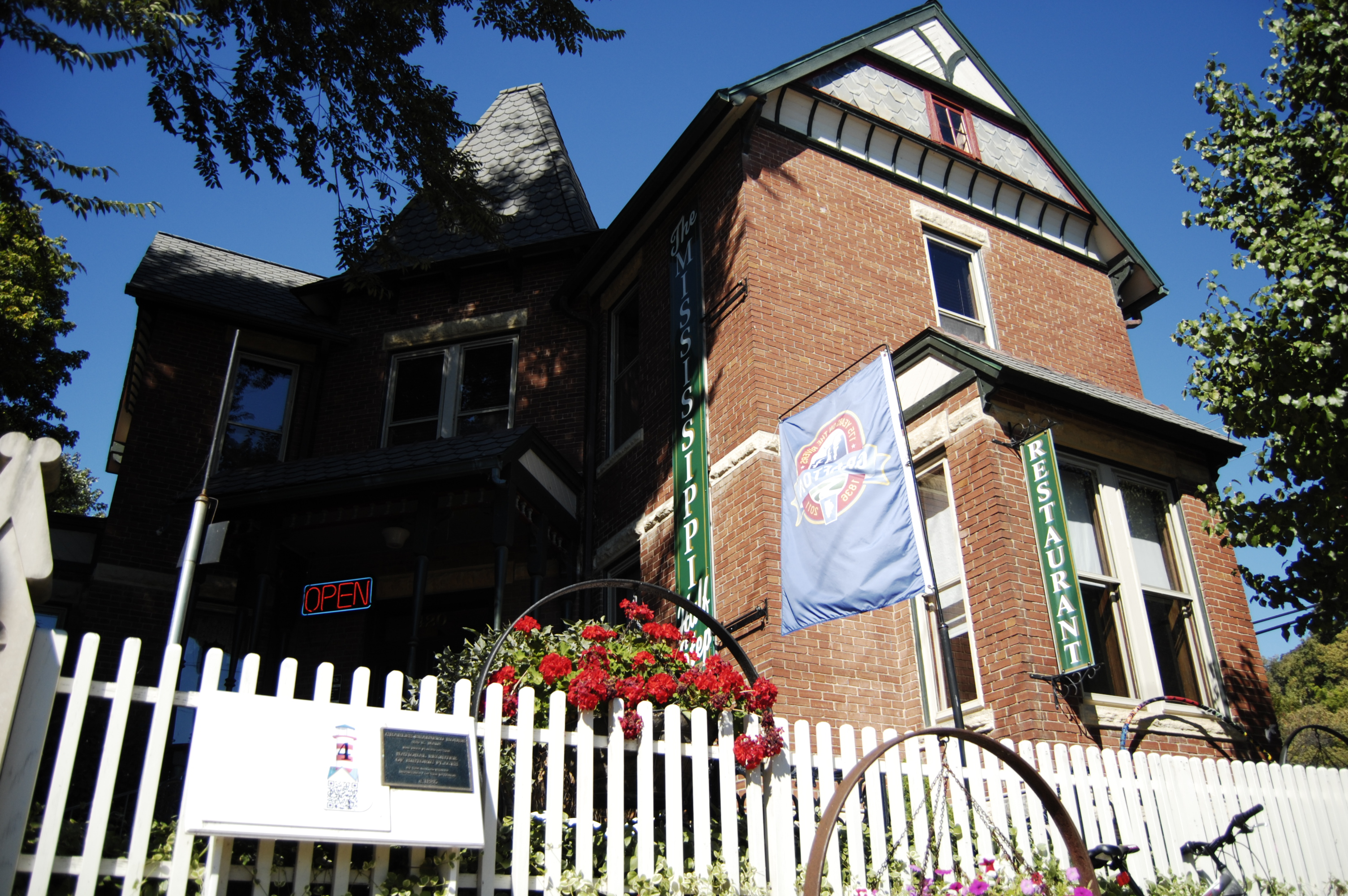

- Location within Illinois Location within the United States
- Location: 420 E. Main St., Grafton, Illinois
- Coordinates: 38°58′19″N 90°25′45″W
- Area: less than one acre
- Built: 1885
- Architect: Embley, William
- Architectural style: Queen Anne
- MPS: Grafton MPS
- NRHP reference No.: 98000065
- Added to NRHP: February 5, 1998

The Charles Brainerd House is a historic house located at 420 E. Main St. in Grafton, Illinois. The house was built in 1885 for Charles Corrington Brainerd, the superintendent of the Grafton Stone and Transportation Company. Architect William Embley designed the house in the Queen Anne style. The house has an asymmetrical plan which includes an angled front entrance and a multi-component roof with several gables and a pyramid above the entrance. Three of the gable ends feature coved cornices and decorative shingles and wood pieces. The front porch is supported by turned posts and features quarter round brackets and a spindlework cornice on its roof. The house was added to the National Register of Historic Places on February 5, 1998.
