= Smith-Duncan House and Eastman Barn =

Historic house in Illinois, United States

- U.S. National Register of Historic Places
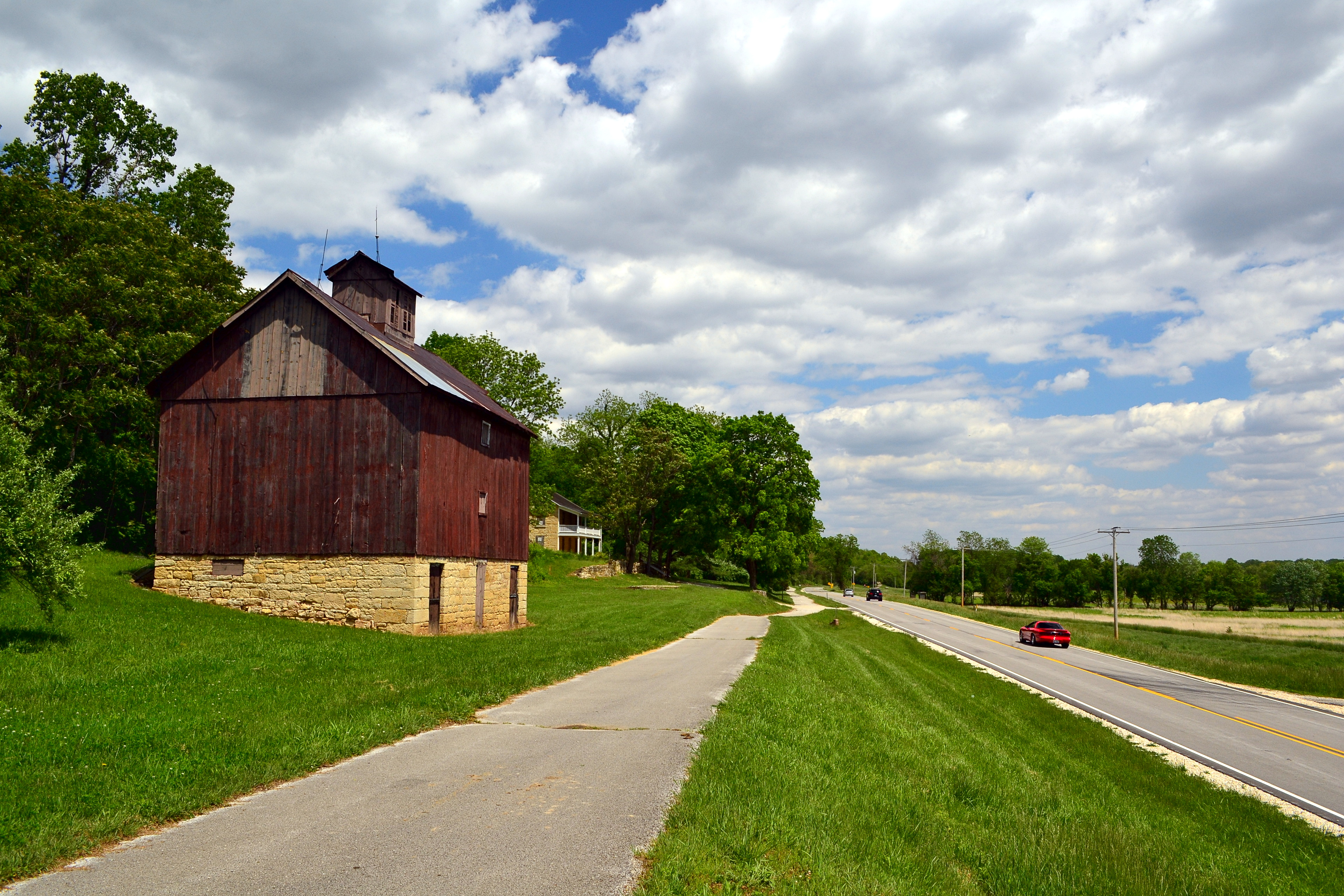
- The Eastman Barn

- Location within Illinois Location within the United States
- Location: Illinois Route 100 at Pere Marquette State Park, 2,000 feet (610 m) west of Deer Lick Hollow
- Coordinates: 38°58′09″N 90°30′43″W
- Area: 0 acres (0 ha)
- Built: 1861, 1876
- Architectural style: Central hall-double pile
- NRHP reference No.: 99001379
- Added to NRHP: November 22, 1999

The Smith-Duncan House and Eastman Barn are two historic buildings located on the Duncan Farmstead at Pere Marquette State Park in Jersey County, Illinois. The Smith-Duncan House is a two-story limestone house built circa 1861. The house has a double-pile plan, in which each story is two rooms deep, with a central hall. The Eastman Barn has three interior sections and is built on a raised limestone foundation; this arrangement allowed for threshing and storage to be done in the barn and provided a basement space for livestock. A gabled cupola on the barn's roof allows for air to vent from the structure. Both buildings, as well as two contributing retaining walls on the property, are well-preserved examples of local stonework; limestone was a common building material in the Grafton area during the mid-19th century.

The buildings were added to the National Register of Historic Places on November 22, 1999.

== See also ==
- Duncan Farm (Grafton, Illinois), an archaeological site on the same farmstead
