= Duncan Manor =

Historic house in Illinois, United States

- U.S. National Register of Historic Places
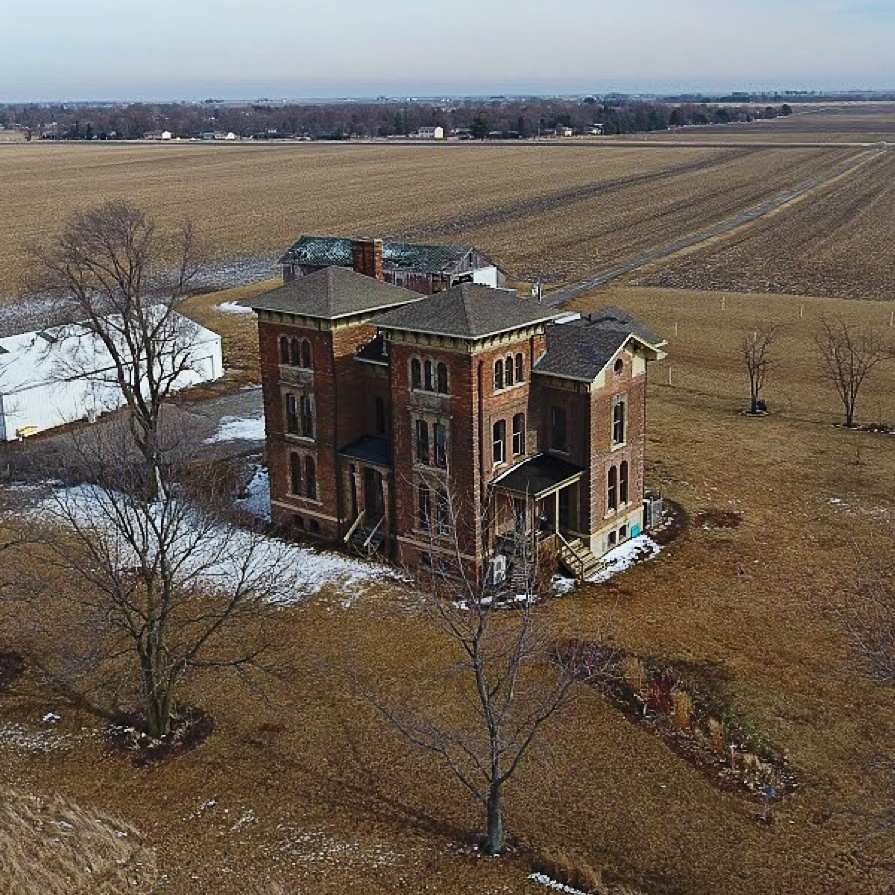

- Location within Illinois Location within the United States
- Location: McLean County, Illinois
- Nearest city: Towanda
- Coordinates: 40°33′52″N 88°53′57″W
- Area: 6 acres (2.4 ha)
- Built: 1866
- Architectural style: Italianate
- NRHP reference No.: 79003164
- Added to NRHP: February 9, 1979

Duncan Manor is a historic house located in rural McLean County, Illinois, near Towanda. The house was built circa 1866 for William R. Duncan, a livestock breeder, who was well respected for his short-horned cattle.

== Architecture ==
The Italianate house features two three-story towers on its northwest facade; the towers feature bracketed cornices on their pyramidal roofs. The main entrance is located between the towers. The southeast side of the house features 2 1/2-story towers topped with ornamental bracketed pediments. The towers flank a two-story entrance porch topped by additional bracketing.

The mansion is designed in an H-shape marked by towers, similar to Renaissance design. It is built entirely with bricks from Chicago and has stone trimmings. The central hallway features a hand-carved curving walnut staircase. The mansion has 20 rooms and 65 windows. There is also a trap door in one of the second floor bedrooms. The property also includes a pole barn.

== History ==
=== 1860s ===
Duncan Manor was built in 1866. William R. Duncan, a livestock breeder well respected for his short-horned cattle, was a native of Kentucky who came to Illinois to recover financially after identifying as a Union Party member during the Civil War.

In 1864, Duncan purchased 300 acres and named it "Towanda Meadows".

=== 1970s ===
The house was added to the National Register of Historic Places on February 9, 1979.

=== 2000s ===
In 2007, the property was listed on Landmarks Illinois’ Most Endangered Historic Places in Illinois.

=== 2010s ===
In 2016, Duncan Manor was acquired by David and Randi Howell and incorporated as a 501(c)3 nonprofit. When the Howells acquired the property, there was no electricity, HVAC, water, or plumbing. The house had been vandalized when it was vacant. Repairs included the leaking roof, rotting porches, and crumbling walls.

The house is currently being restored, as well as reclaiming the surrounding prairie land. Duncan Manor functions as a private residence, but is available for small tours, concerts, weddings, and other community events.
