= Horace Duncan House =

Historic house in Florida, United States

- U.S. National Register of Historic Places
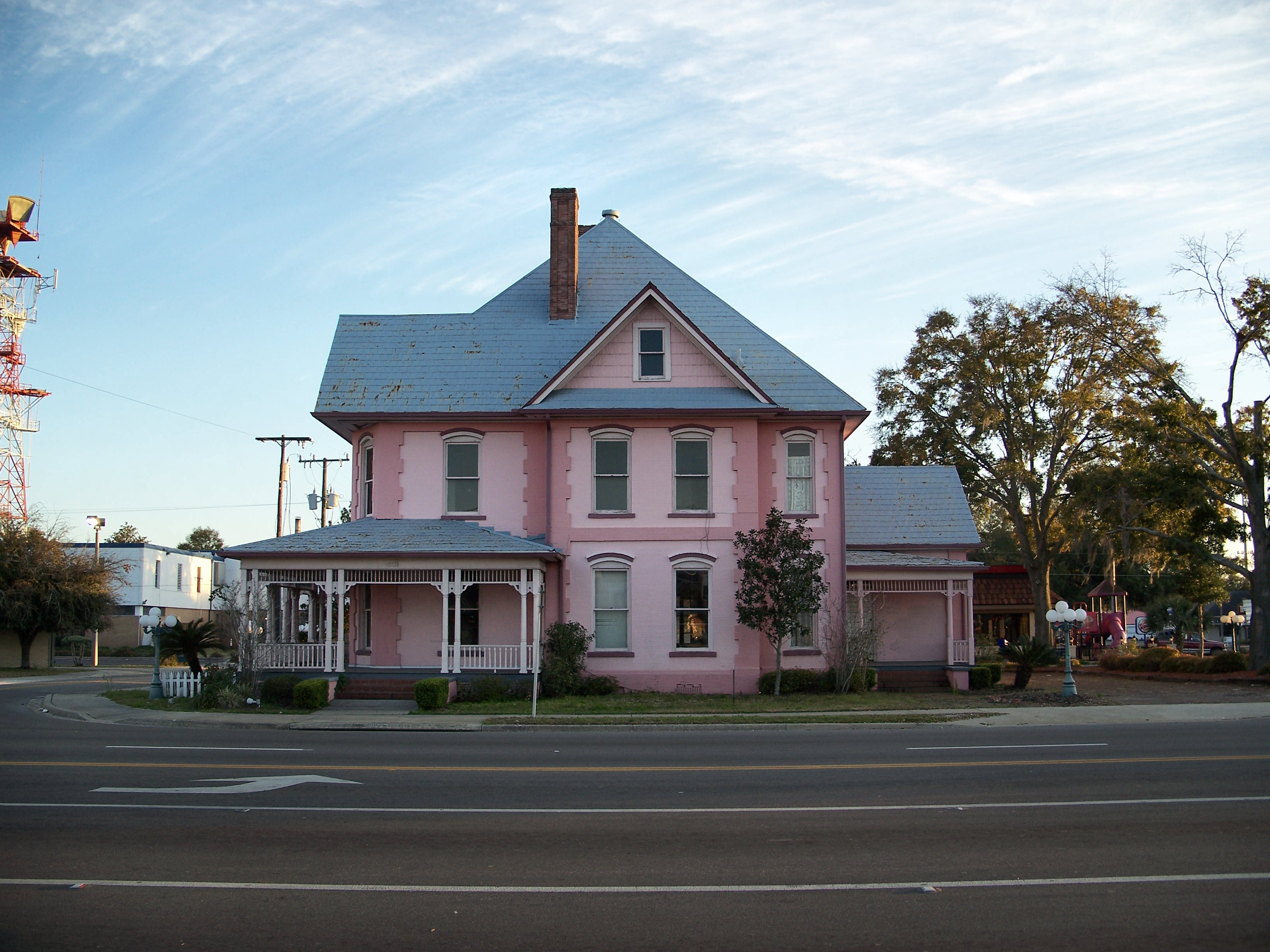

- Location within Florida Location within the United States
- Location: 202 West Duval Street, Lake City, Florida
- Coordinates: 30°11′19″N 82°38′20″W
- Built: 1907
- Architectural style: Colonial Revival, Queen Anne
- NRHP reference No.: 93001155
- Added to NRHP: November 15, 1993

The Horace Duncan House (also known as the Herlong House) is a historic site in Lake City, Florida, United States. It is located at 202 West Duval Street. On November 15, 1993, it was added to the U.S. National Register of Historic Places.
