= Slaten-LaMarsh House =

Historic house in Illinois, United States

- U.S. National Register of Historic Places
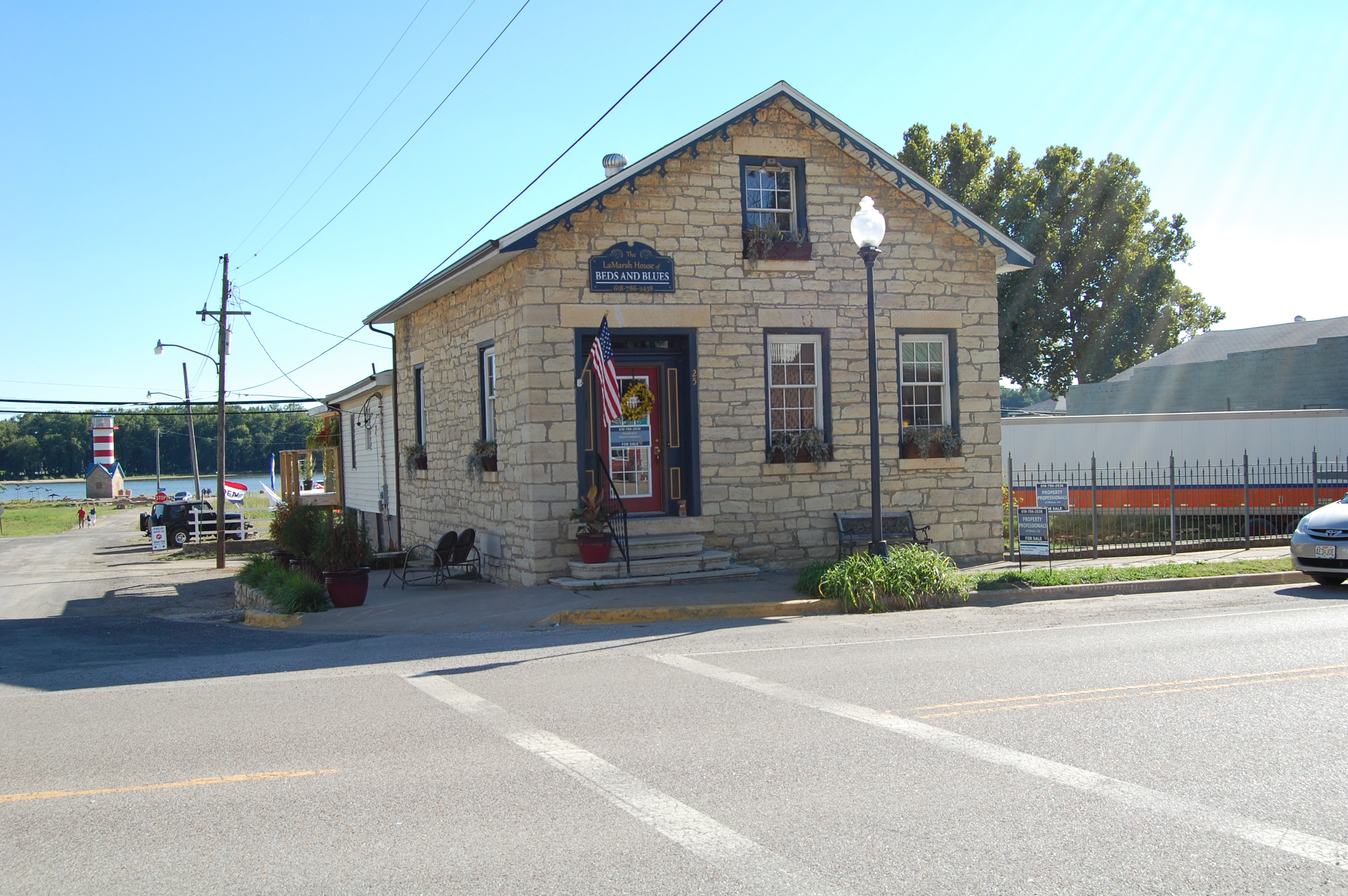

- Location within Illinois Location within the United States
- Location: 25 E. Main St., Grafton, Illinois
- Coordinates: 38°58′10″N 90°26′3″W
- Area: less than one acre
- Built: 1840
- Architectural style: Side hall plan
- MPS: Grafton MPS
- NRHP reference No.: 94000018
- Added to NRHP: February 16, 1994

The Slaten-LaMarsh House is a historic house located at 25 E. Main St. in Grafton, Illinois. The house was built circa 1840 for D.C. Slaten, the first mayor of Grafton. The house has a side hall plan, a design featuring a hall on one side and rooms connected by the hall on the other. It is a rare 1 1/2-story side-hall plan house, as other houses using the plan in Grafton are all two stories. Locally quarried limestone was used to build the house; at the time of its construction, Grafton limestone was only used to build structures within the city, though it later became a widespread building material in the region. The limestone blocks on the front facade are visibly more ashlar than those on the sides, a masonry choice which gives the front corners a quoin-like appearance.

The house was added to the National Register of Historic Places on February 16, 1994.
