= Hersey-Duncan House =

Historic house in Delaware, US

- U.S. National Register of Historic Places
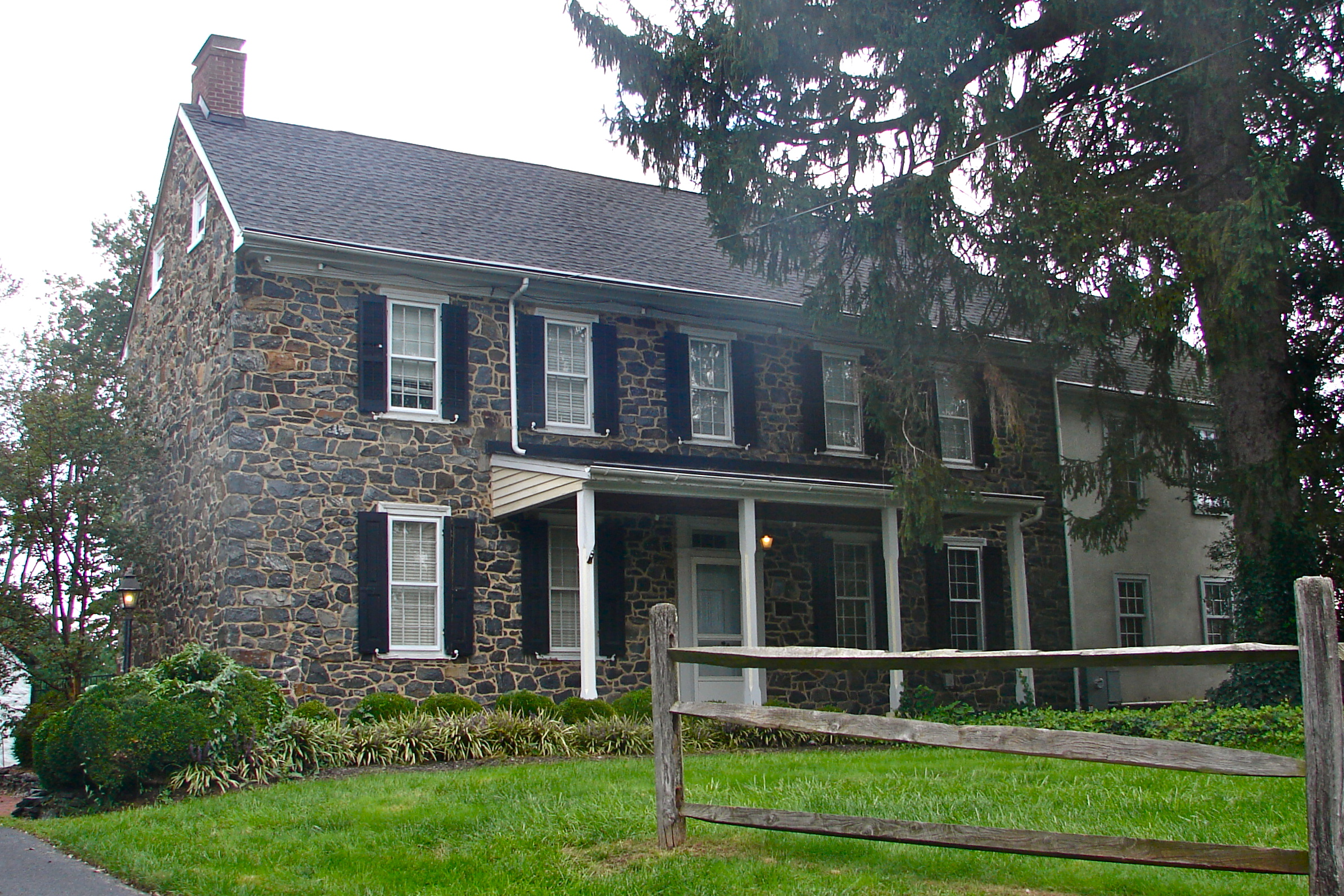
- Hersey-Duncan House, October 2011

- Location within Delaware Location within the United States
- Location: 2116 Duncan Rd., Mill Creek Hundred, near Wilmington, Delaware
- Coordinates: 39.734942°N 75.640706°W
- Area: 1.8 acres (0.73 ha)
- Built: c. 1800
- Architectural style: Federal, Vernacular Federal
- NRHP reference No.: 90001714
- Added to NRHP: November 15, 1990

Hersey-Duncan House is a historic home located near Wilmington, Delaware, United States. It was built about 1800, and is a two-story, five-bay, center passage plan dwelling with a gable roof and two-story, stone, rear kitchen wing. It is in a vernacular Federal style. A stuccoed frame, one-story, gable-roof kitchen was added to the north endwall of the main block about 1950 and a two-story frame wing was added to the south side of the rear kitchen wing in the 1930s. Also on the property is a contributing 19th century, stone smokehouse. The house was built by a prominent Red Clay Creek miller in the early 19th century.

It was added to the National Register of Historic Places in 1990.
