= Paris Mason Building =

- U.S. National Register of Historic Places
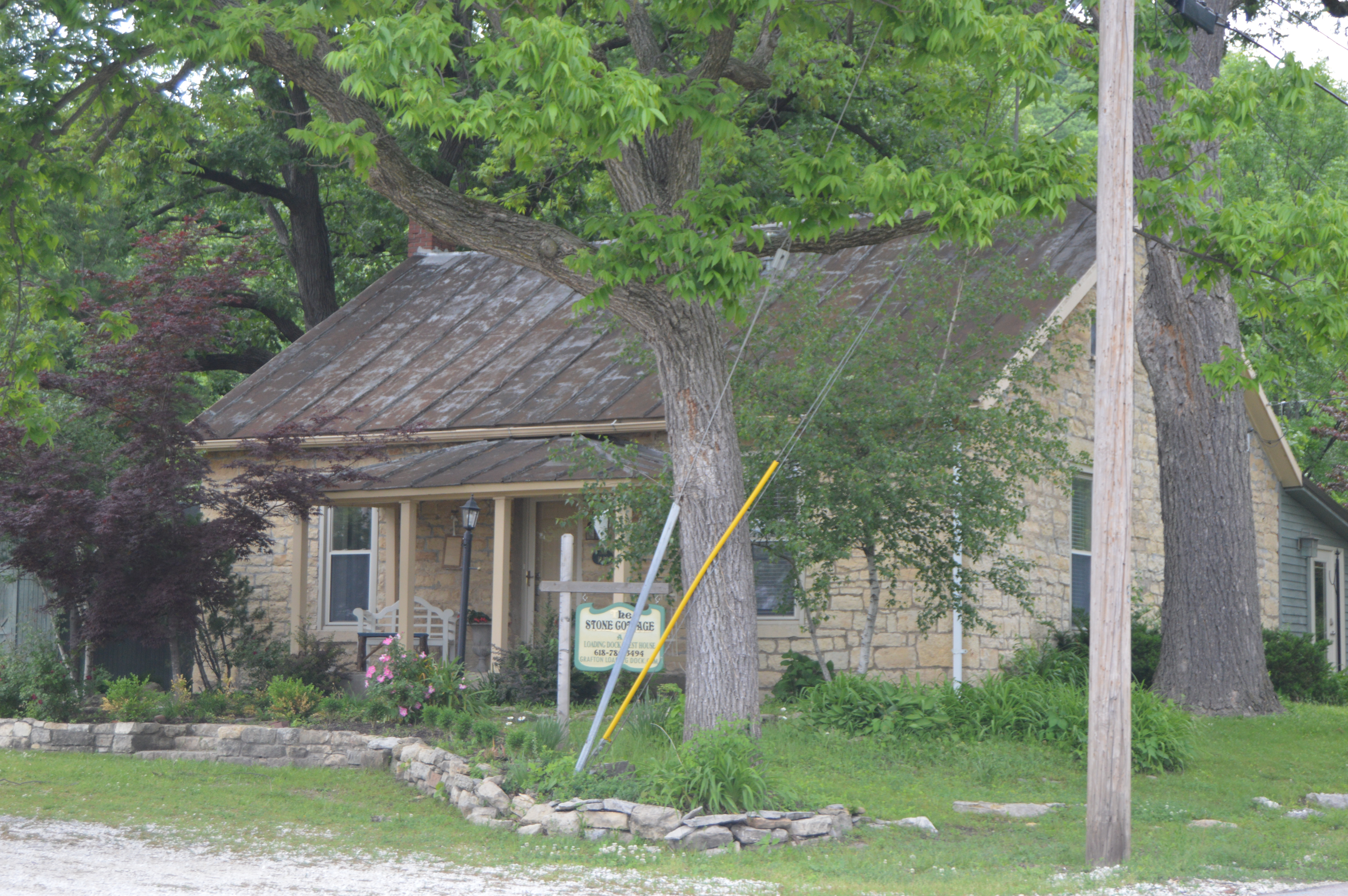

- Location within Illinois Location within the United States
- Location: 100 N. Springfield St., Grafton, Illinois
- Coordinates: 38°58′17″N 90°27′01″W
- Area: less than one acre
- Built: c. 1840
- Architectural style: Hall and parlor style
- MPS: Grafton MPS
- NRHP reference No.: 94000017
- Added to NRHP: February 16, 1994

The Paris Mason Building is a historic house located at 100 N. Springfield St. in Grafton, Illinois. The house was built circa 1840 for Paris Mason, the brother of Grafton's founder James Mason, and was at the time a riverfront building which Mason used as a house and warehouse. The four-room hall and parlor house was built with rock-faced limestone; its only decorations are the limestone lintels and sills on the windows. The building is an early example of local limestone construction in Grafton, as it predates the regional boom in limestone quarrying and construction in the 1850s.

The building was added to the National Register of Historic Places on February 6, 1994.
