= Duncan Farm (Grafton, Illinois) =

Archaeological site in Illinois, United States

- U.S. National Register of Historic Places
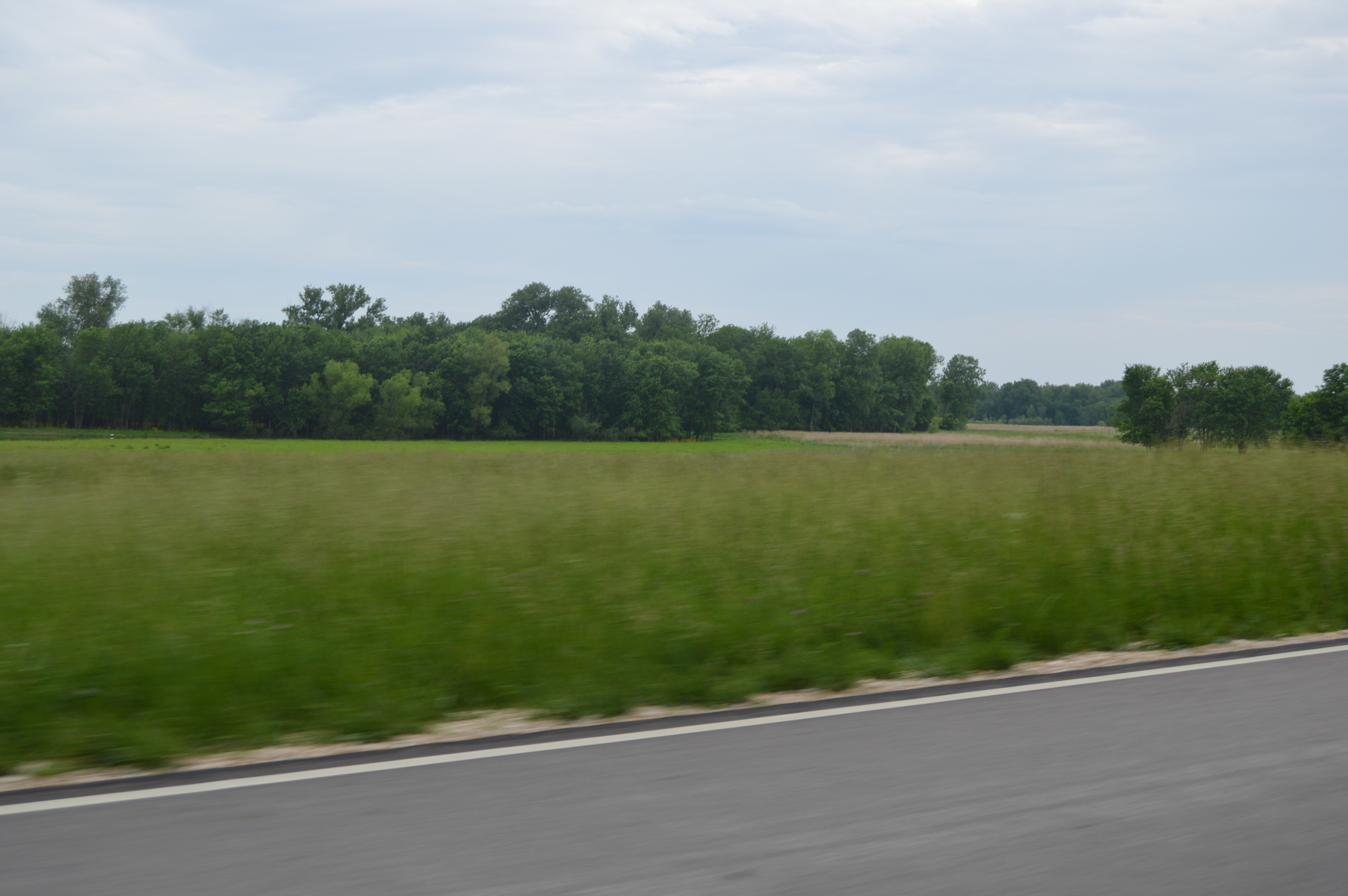
- The site from Illinois Route 100

- Location within Illinois Location within the United States
- Location: Southern side of Illinois Route 100, ½ mile west of Brussels Ferry
- Coordinates: 38°58′05″N 90°30′49″W
- Area: 55 acres (22 ha)
- NRHP reference No.: 82002542
- Added to NRHP: August 24, 1982

Duncan Farm is an archaeological site located on a farmstead south of Illinois Route 100 in Jersey County, Illinois, near the city of Grafton. The site, which dates from the Woodland period, includes two burial mounds and a habitation site. The site was part of the Hopewell exchange system in Illinois and is the closest neighboring village site to the Golden Eagle regional transaction center, a major trade and social hub in the system. Archaeologists have suggested that the site is a local transaction center in the Golden Eagle site's region due to its two large mounds, which are roughly 200 feet (61 m) long and 100 feet (30 m) wide each. In addition, the site is archaeologically significant due to its distinctive stratification, which allows its artifacts to be easily dated.

The site was added to the National Register of Historic Places on August 24, 1982.

== See also ==
- Smith-Duncan House and Eastman Barn, historic buildings on the same farmstead
