= Grafton Bank =

- U.S. National Register of Historic Places
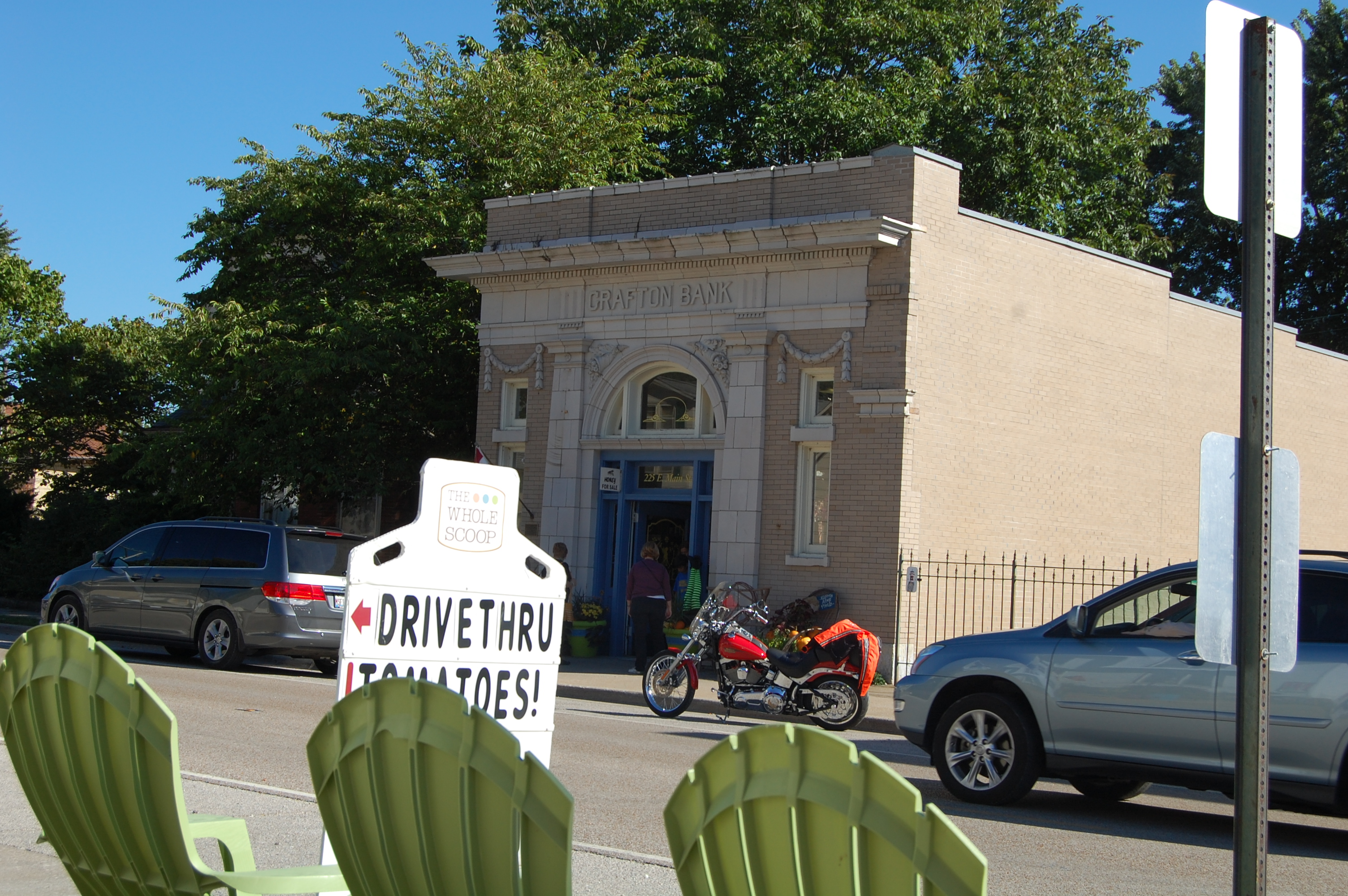

- Location within Illinois Location within the United States
- Location: 225 E. Main St., Grafton, Illinois
- Coordinates: 38°58′10″N 90°25′55″W
- Area: less than one acre
- Built: 1913
- Architectural style: Classical Revival
- MPS: Grafton MPS
- NRHP reference No.: 94000016
- Added to NRHP: February 16, 1994

The Grafton Bank is a historic bank building located at 225 E. Main St. in Grafton, Illinois. The Classical Revival building was constructed in 1913. The buff brick building features extensive terra cotta ornamentation on its front facade. A Diocletian window and terra cotta transom bar top the entrance, and terra cotta pilasters stand on either side. A classical entablature tops the entrance; the entablature includes an architrave, a frieze inscribed with the bank's name, and a dentillated three-section cornice. A brick parapet wall tops the facade; a stepped parapet recedes from the wall along the sides of the building. The bank which originally occupied the building closed in the 1930s, and the building has since been used for a variety of other, mainly commercial, purposes.

The building was added to the National Register of Historic Places on February 16, 1994.

The building was featured on The Profit, a CNBC program.
