= John and Amelia McClintock House =

Historic house in Illinois, United States

- U.S. National Register of Historic Places
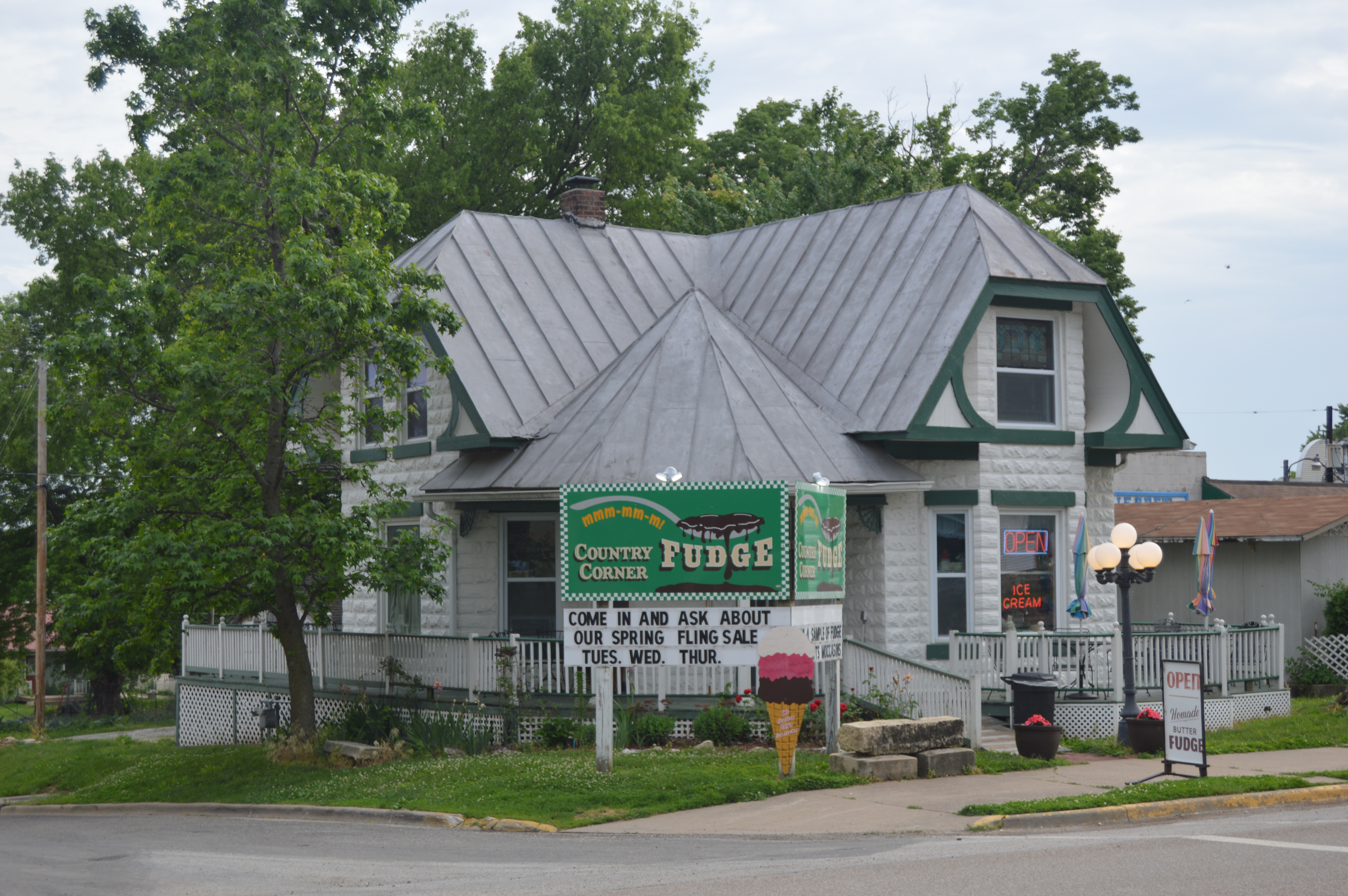

- Location within Illinois Location within the United States
- Location: 321 E. Main St., Grafton, Illinois
- Coordinates: 38°58′10″N 90°25′50″W
- Area: less than one acre
- Built: 1910
- Built by: McClintock, John
- Architectural style: Queen Anne
- MPS: Grafton MPS
- NRHP reference No.: 94000019
- Added to NRHP: February 16, 1994

The John and Amelia McClintock House is a historic building located at 321 E. Main Street in Grafton, Illinois. Boat builder John McClintock built the house for his family circa 1910. The rock-faced concrete house, an unusual departure from Grafton's limestone buildings, has a Queen Anne design. The entrance is located at the corner of a wraparound front porch and is topped by a conical roof. The front of the house has a cutaway bay, giving the house an asymmetrical appearance, and the gable roof has multiple components; both features are typical of Queen Anne designs. The building is now used as a commercial property.

The house was added to the National Register of Historic Places on February 16, 1994.
