= Ruebel Hotel =

- U.S. National Register of Historic Places
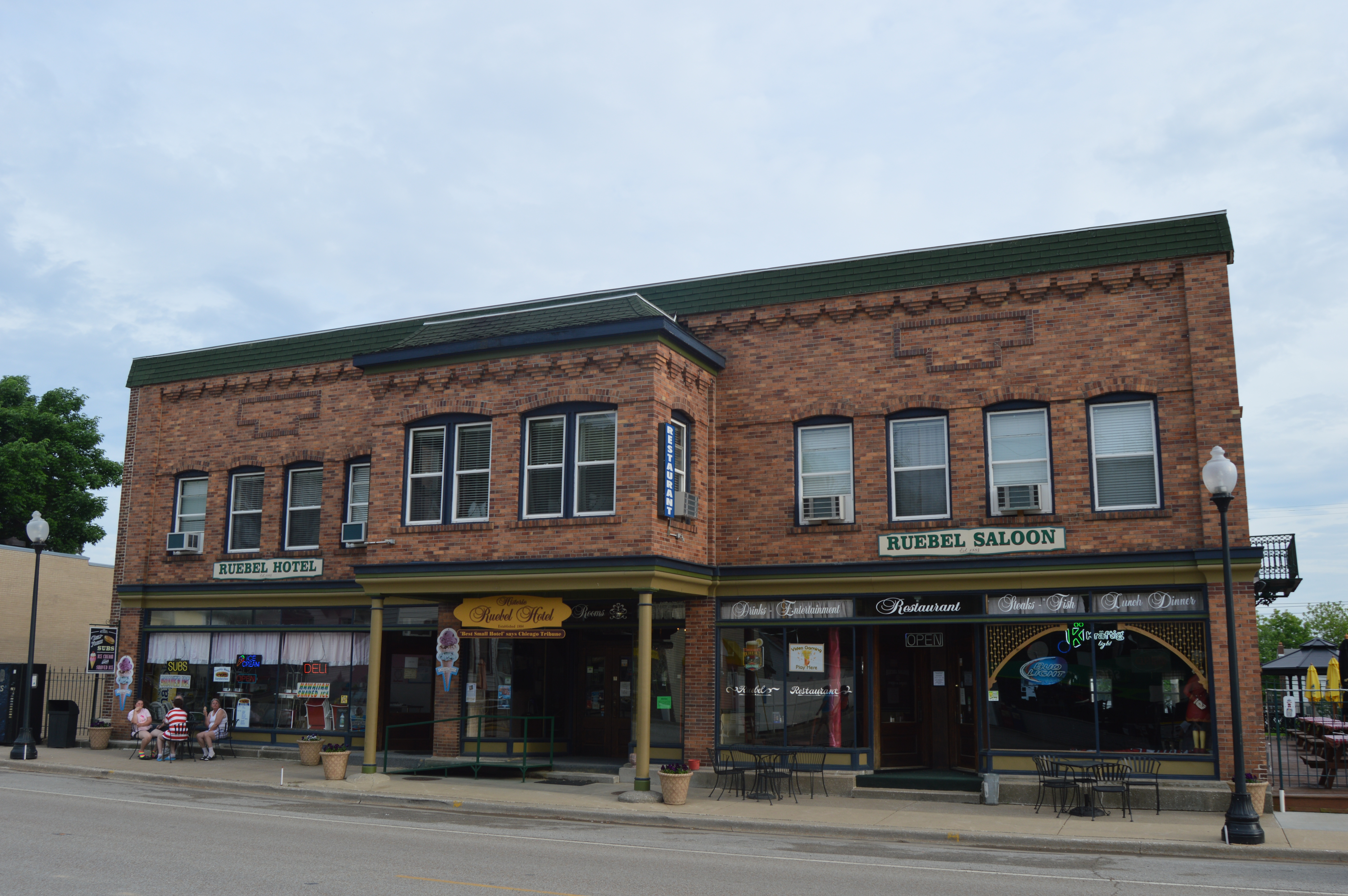

- Location within Illinois Location within the United States
- Location: 207–215 E. Main St., Grafton, Illinois
- Coordinates: 38°58′11″N 90°25′56″W
- Area: less than one acre
- Built: 1913
- Architectural style: Commercial
- MPS: Grafton MPS
- NRHP reference No.: 94000015
- Added to NRHP: February 16, 1994

The Ruebel Hotel is a historic hotel located at 207–215 E. Main St. in Grafton, Illinois. Built in 1913, the structure is the second hotel building on the site; the original Ruebel Hotel was built in 1879 and burned down in 1912. The Commercial style building features decorative brickwork typical of the style; the building's cornice has brick corbelling, and raised brick panels decorate the space above the second-story brick arched windows. The hotel, which also included a saloon and a restaurant, gained a reputation as one of the best in Jersey County. It is the only surviving hotel in Grafton.

The hotel was added to the National Register of Historic Places on February 16, 1994.
