= Jersey Community Hospital =

Geography
- Location: 400 Maple Summit Road, Jerseyville, Illinois, United States
- Coordinates: 39.1106°N 90.3427°W

Organization
- Care system: Public, Medicaid, Medicare
- Type: General
- Affiliated university: None

Services
- Beds: 67

History
- Opened: 1954, original building 1977, current facility

Links
- Website: www.jch.org
- Lists: Hospitals in Illinois

Jersey Community Hospital (occasionally known as JCH) is a full-service hospital located in Jerseyville, Illinois. The hospital was founded in 1954 and is owned by the citizens of Jersey County. The hospital moved from its original location to a larger 20-acre (8.1 ha) campus in 1977 and continues to operate from that location today. The original 1954 building still exists and is currently used as a nursing home.

Jersey Community Hospital employs approximately 400 people and has the largest payroll in the county. It currently has 67 inpatient beds. While the hospital currently participates with various hospital alliances and associations, it remains an independent facility.

The immediate hospital campus has expanded in recent years, with the additions of the JCH Wellness Center fitness facility and the JCH Women's Center and Sleep Center. The emergency department has been expanded twice, in 1994 and in 2012. Services include 24-hour emergency department physician coverage, hospice, respite care, cardiac rehab, physical and occupational therapy and county-wide ambulance services.

There are around 2,100 admissions, 1,700 surgeries, 12,000 emergency department visits, 300 births and 60,000 outpatients each year.
