= Duncan–Duitsman Farm Historic District =

Historic district in Iowa, United States

- DuncanFarmHomeOfTheRealGoodEggs
- U.S. National Register of Historic Places
- U.S. Historic district
- Location within Iowa Location within the United States
- Location: 4324 180th St.
- Nearest city: George, Iowa
- Coordinates: 43°23′22″N 95°56′02″W
- Area: 160 acres (65 ha)
- MPS: Historic Farmsteads of Lyon County MPS
- NRHP reference No.: 94001138
- Added to NRHP: September 23, 1994

The Duncan–Duitsman Farm Historic District is a nationally recognized agricultural historic district located northeast of George, Iowa, United States. It was listed on the National Register of Historic Places in 1994. At the time of its nomination, it contained 19 resources, which included 12 contributing buildings, four contributing sites, one contributing structure, and two non-contributing buildings. Its historic importance is derived from being two pioneer farmsteads from the last section of Iowa opened to settlement.

John and Marion Duncan were the first settlers on this land and built the 1½-story frame house on the farmstead to the east around 1878. It is the only structure left from his era. Duncan farmed his 80 acres (32 ha) for 16 years, and his father-in-law, John Watkins, farmed the 80 acres (32 ha) immediately to the west. John Duitsman bought the Duncan farm in 1894 and built farm buildings from 1904 to 1909. Duitsman later acquired what was the Watkins farm, and he farmed the entire 160 acres (65 ha). He also built the buildings on that farmstead, where he made his home. The present house (non-contributing) was completed in 1949, replacing a house similar to the Duncan house. There are three depressions north of the Duncan house where buildings once stood. They could be all that remains of structures Duncan built that were destroyed in a 1938 tornado. A stand of trees was planted on the north side of both farmsteads, forming a wind break. There is only a small remnant left on the Duncan farmstead. The Argo Slough is on the north side of the property. This land has never been plowed and is a vestige of the native prairie.
