= Col. William H. Fulkerson Farmstead =

- U.S. National Register of Historic Places
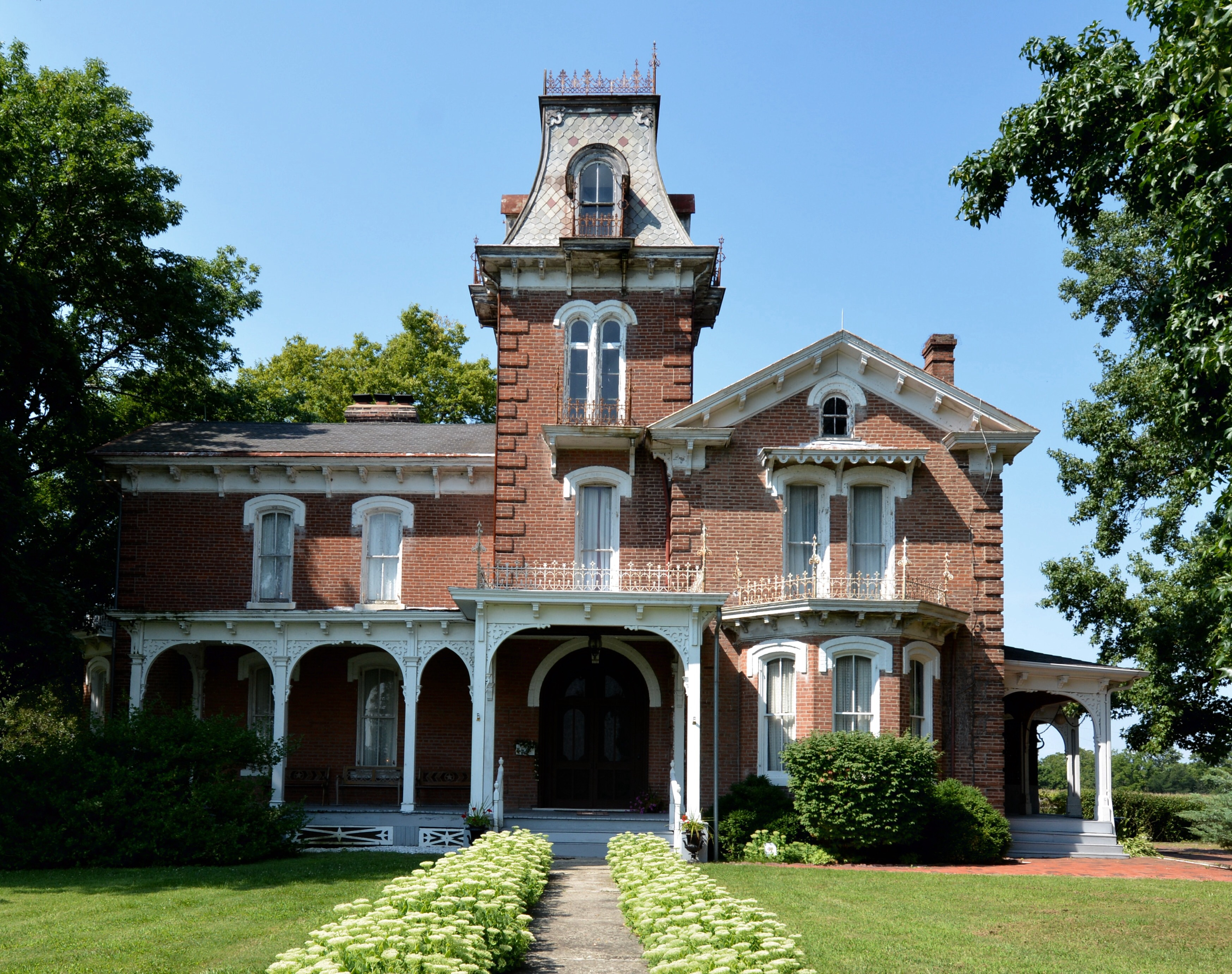

- Location within Illinois Location within the United States
- Location: 1510 N. State St. (U.S. Highway 67), Jerseyville, Illinois
- Coordinates: 39°08′52″N 90°20′54″W
- Area: 58.3 acres (23.6 ha)
- Built: 1866
- Built by: Smith, Nicholas F.
- Architect: Embley, William
- Architectural style: Italianate
- NRHP reference No.: 98000977
- Added to NRHP: August 6, 1998

The Col. William H. Fulkerson Farmstead, also known as Hazel Dell, is a historic farm located at 1510 North State Street (U.S. Route 67) 1.5 miles (2.4 km) north of Jerseyville, Illinois. The 58.26 acres (23.58 ha) farm includes an Italian Villa style farmhouse, a carriage house, a barn, grain fields, and fruit orchards. Colonel William H. Fulkerson, a Confederate Civil War veteran, and his wife Cornelia settled at the farm in 1866. The couple began construction on the farmhouse in the same year; it was completed in 1872. The two-story farmhouse, designed by Jerseyville architect William Embley, is one of the best-preserved Italian Villa style houses in the Jerseyville area. A tower with a mansard roof, a characteristic Italian Villa element, tops the front entrance. The house's front porch features arched openings and scrolled bracket; a smaller porch on the north side has the same design. In typical Italianate fashion, the house's windows are mainly tall and rectangular with brick hoods, and several have a segmental arched form.

The farm was added to the National Register of Historic Places on August 6, 1998.
