= Grafton Historic District (Grafton, Illinois) =

Historic district in Illinois, United States

- U.S. National Register of Historic Places
- U.S. Historic district
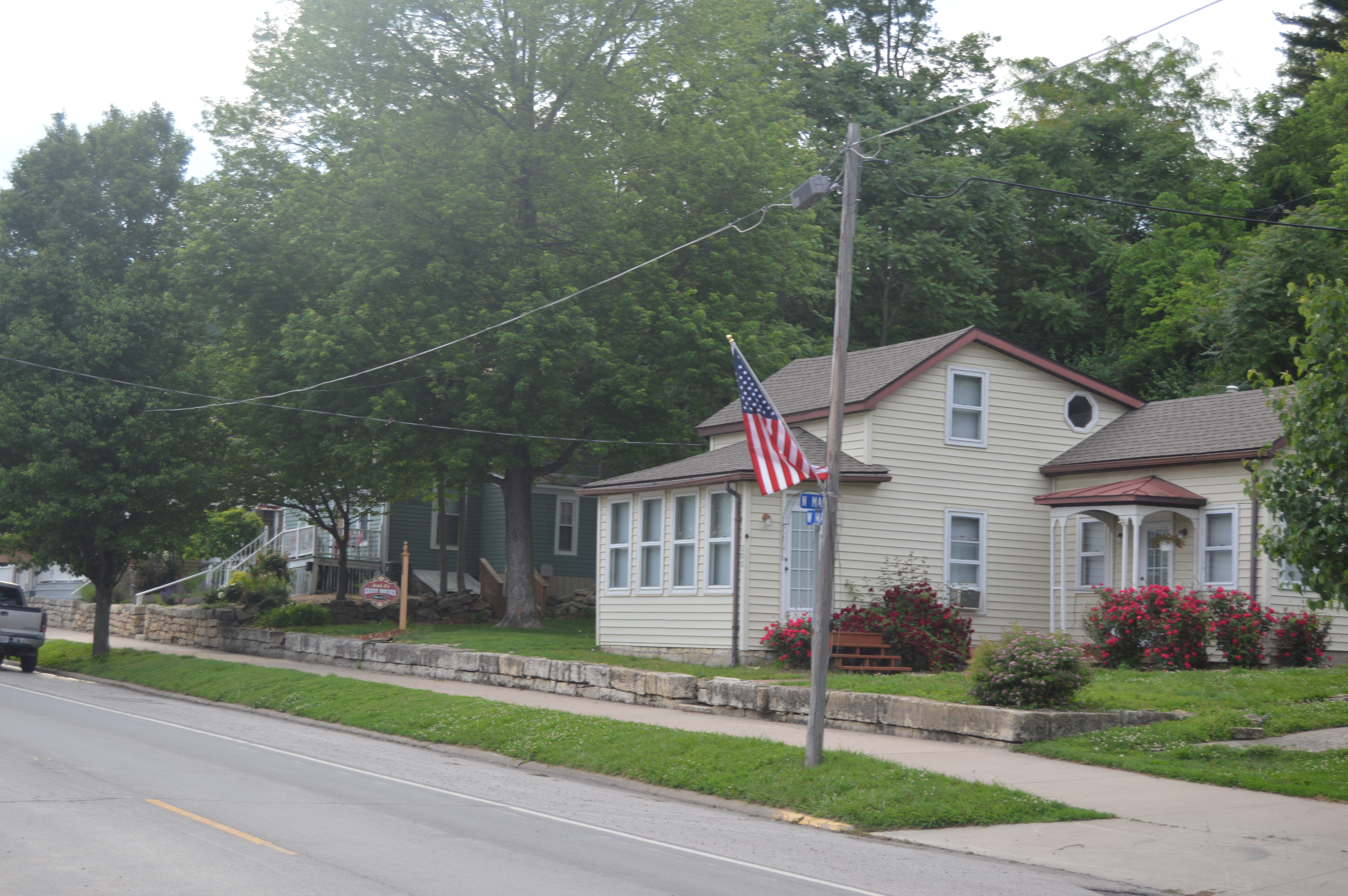

- Location within Illinois Location within the United States
- Location: 105--225 and 24--214 W. Main St., and stone wharf at Maple St., Grafton, Illinois
- Coordinates: 38°58′10″N 90°25′55″W
- Area: 6 acres (2.4 ha)
- MPS: Grafton MPS
- NRHP reference No.: 94000020
- Added to NRHP: February 16, 1994

The Grafton Historic District is a 6-acre (2.4 ha) historic district in Grafton, Illinois. The district includes two blocks of Main Street (Illinois Route 100) and a section of Maple Street connecting to Grafton's historic wharf on the Mississippi River. The section of Main Street is a mostly residential portion of the city's primary residential, commercial, and social corridor. The houses in the district were built from 1836 to 1925 and have a variety of designs. Formal styles represented in the district include Queen Anne and Italianate; vernacular plans such as hall and parlor and side hall are also present. The Grafton Ice House is the lone commercial building in the district; built circa 1840, it is the only surviving building from Grafton's ice industry, which sold and stored frozen water from the river. The limestone wharf was built in 1846 to serve river transport, trade, and entertainment in Grafton; it was the city's second wharf, replacing an earthen wharf that was lost to a flood.

The district was added to the National Register of Historic Places on February 16, 1994.
