= Jersey County Courthouse =

Government building in Illinois, US

- U.S. National Register of Historic Places
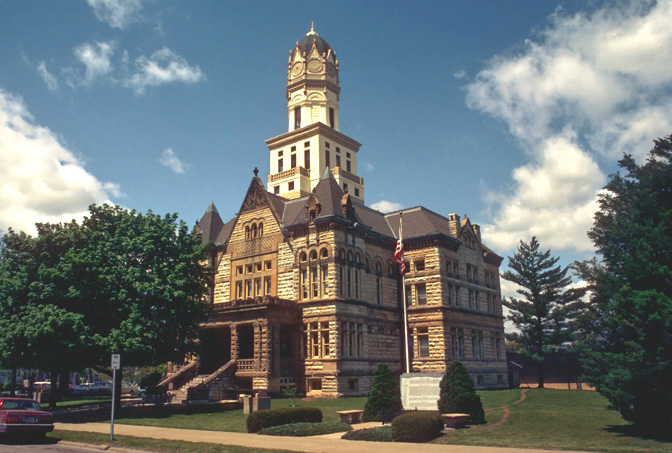

- Location within Illinois Location within the United States
- Interactive map showing the location of Jersey County Courthouse
- Location: 201 W. Pearl Street, Jerseyville, Illinois
- Coordinates: 39°7′8″N 90°19′44″W
- Area: less than one acre
- Built: 1893–94
- Built by: F.W. Menke
- Architect: Elliot, Henry
- Architectural style: Romanesque
- NRHP reference No.: 86001008
- Added to NRHP: May 8, 1986

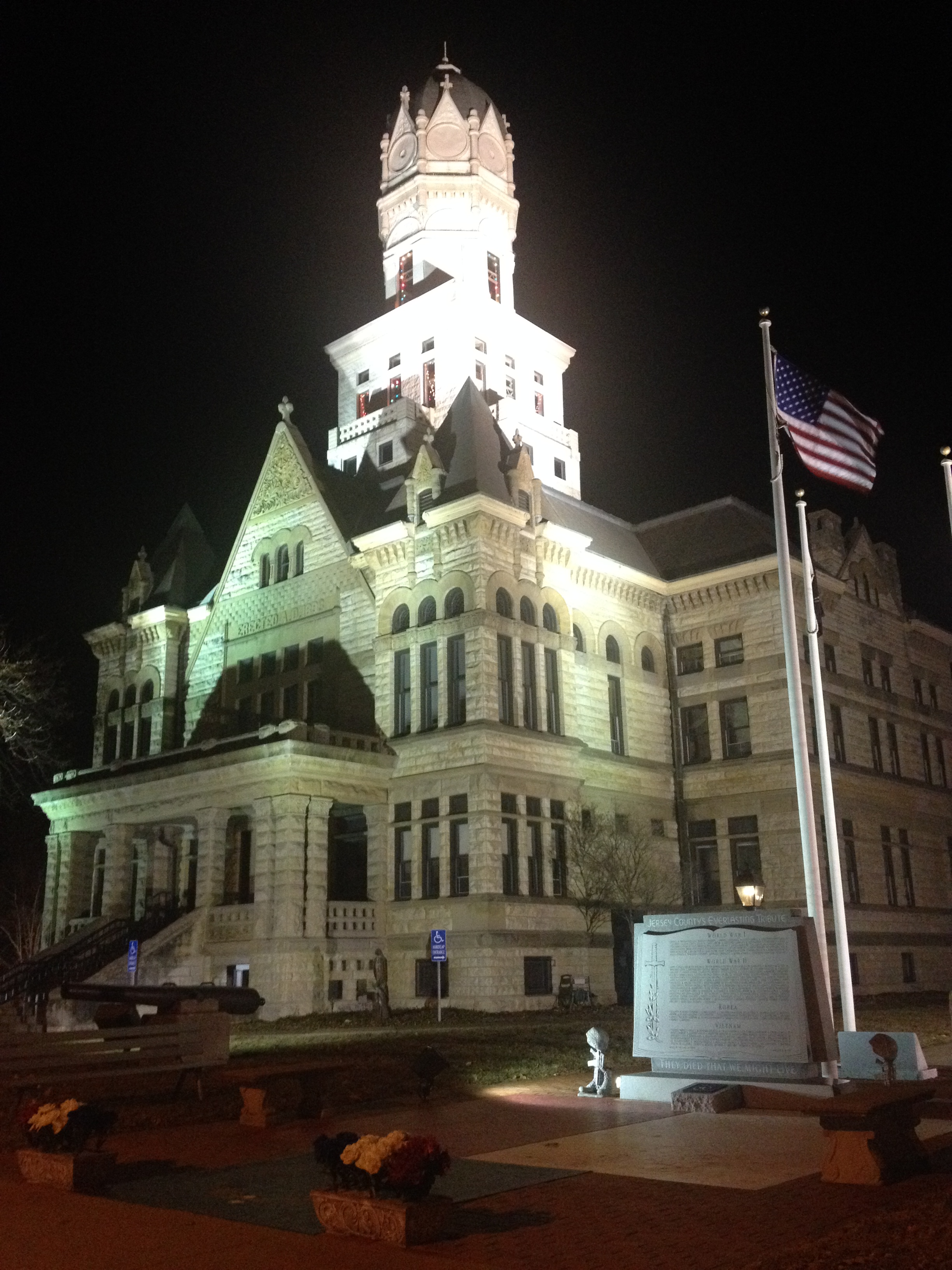
View of the Jersey County Courthouse at night

The Jersey County Courthouse, located on 201 W. Pearl Street in Jerseyville, is Jersey County, Illinois' county courthouse. Built in 1893–94, the 124 foot (37.8 meter) tall courthouse was the third used by the county since its formation in 1839. Architect Henry Elliott of Chicago and Jacksonville designed the building in the Romanesque Revival style. The building's design features a tall central tower topped by an octagonal cupola, terminal towers at the front corners, and a raised front porch. The building's limestone exterior, which is intricately decorated on the front face, uses stone quarried at the nearby city of Grafton. The Jersey County Illinois courthouse was the third courthouse designed by Mr Elliott who also designed the Greene County Courthouse (1891) in Carrollton, Illinois; Edgar County Courthouse (1891) in Paris, Illinois; DeWitt County Illinois Courthouse (1893) in Clinton, Illinois and Pike County Illinois Courthouse (1894) in Pittsfield. The DeWitt County Courthouse was demolished in 1987.

The courthouse was added to the National Register of Historic Places on May 8, 1986.
