= Grafton, Illinois =

Grafton
- City
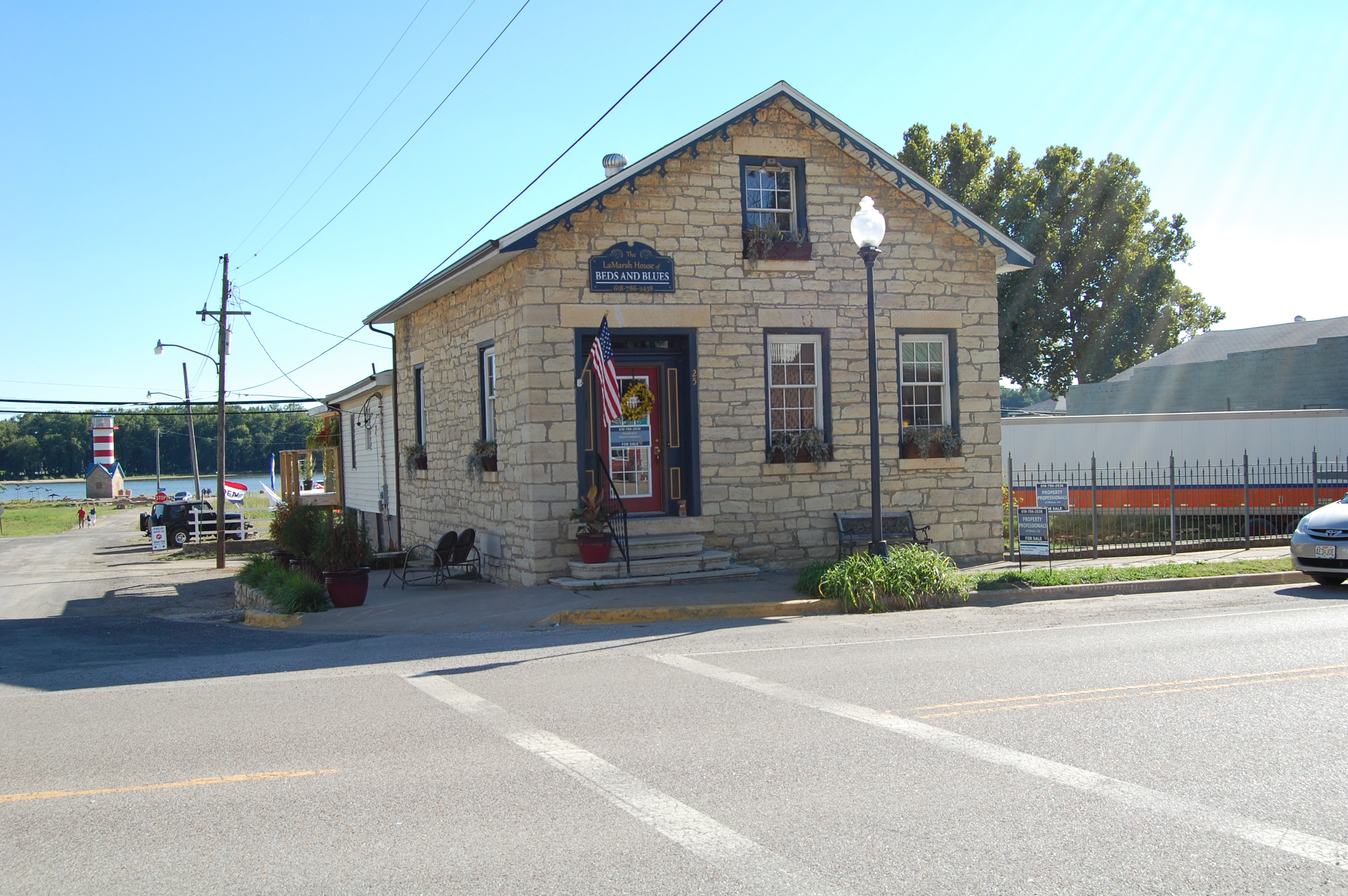
- The Slaten-LaMarsh House, Downtown Grafton
- Motto: “Key West of the Midwest”
- Location of Grafton in Jersey County, Illinois.
- Coordinates: 38°58′35″N 90°25′33″W
- Country: United States
- State: Illinois
- County: Jersey
- Township: Quarry
- Founded: 1832

Government
  - Type: Mayor-Council

Area
  - Total: 3.71 sq mi (9.62 km^{2})
  - Land: 3.71 sq mi (9.62 km^{2})
  - Water: 0 sq mi (0.00 km^{2})
- Elevation: 745 ft (227 m)

Population (2020)
  - Total: 626
  - Density: 168.6/sq mi (65.11/km^{2})
- Time zone: UTC-6 (CST)
  - Summer (DST): UTC-5 (CDT)
- ZIP code: 62037
- Area code: 618
- FIPS code: 17-30653
- GNIS feature ID: 2394943
- Website: http://cityofgraftonil.com/

Grafton is the oldest city in Jersey County, Illinois, United States. It is located near the confluence of the Illinois and Mississippi Rivers. As of the 2020 census, the city had a total population of 626.

Grafton is a part of the Metro-East region and Greater St. Louis.

== History ==
Founded in 1832 by James Mason, Grafton is the oldest city in Jersey County. Described as having "a post office, one store, one tavern, and a number of families" in 1834, the area was being settled as early as 1812 when a blockhouse was built at the confluence for protection. The city was named after Mason's birthplace of Grafton, Massachusetts. Grafton was incorporated on May 16, 1907.

Grafton's population reached its peak at approximately 10,000 in the 1850s with employment opportunities coming from the local stone quarries, boat building and commercial fishing. At one point, there were five quarries in or around Grafton that employed nearly 2,000 men. The local limestone was used to build the Eads Bridge in St. Louis, government buildings in Rock Island, and the Jersey County Courthouse in Jerseyville. The Shafer's Wharf Historic District was one of the largest commercial fishing centers along the Mississippi River in the late 19th century. The Old Boatworks, located south of Main Street, once housed a paint house and a machine shop where paddle wheelers and later PT boats were built. Today, the Old Boatworks building hosts many antique and craft stalls and is open on the fourth weekend of each month from May through October.

The Great Flood of 1993 caused significant damage to many of Grafton's structures, and a third of the city's residents moved away. The effects of the flood are still evident and the city's population has not recovered.

== Geography ==
According to the 2021 census gazetteer files, Grafton has a total area of 3.71 square miles (9.61 km^{2}), all land.

=== Climate ===
Typically, the city's climate reflects most Midwest cities, located in the transitional zone between the humid continental climate type and the humid subtropical climate type (Köppen Dfa and Cfa, respectively), with neither large mountains nor large bodies of water to moderate its temperature. Spring is the wettest season and produces severe weather ranging from tornadoes to snow or ice storms. Summers are hot and humid, and the humidity often makes the heat index rise to temperatures feeling well above 100 °F (38 °C). Fall is mild with lower humidity and can produce intermittent bouts of heavy rainfall with the first snow flurries usually forming in late November. Winters can be cold at times with periodic light snow and temperatures below freezing.

== Demographics ==
Historical population
| Census | Pop. | Note | %± |
|---|---|---|---|
| 1850 | 222 | | — |
| 1860 | 1,266 | | 470.3% |
| 1880 | 807 | | — |
| 1890 | 927 | | 14.9% |
| 1900 | 988 | | 6.6% |
| 1910 | 1,116 | | 13.0% |
| 1920 | 949 | | −15.0% |
| 1930 | 1,026 | | 8.1% |
| 1940 | 1,110 | | 8.2% |
| 1950 | 1,117 | | 0.6% |
| 1960 | 1,084 | | −3.0% |
| 1970 | 1,018 | | −6.1% |
| 1980 | 1,024 | | 0.6% |
| 1990 | 918 | | −10.4% |
| 2000 | 609 | | −33.7% |
| 2010 | 674 | | 10.7% |
| 2020 | 626 | | −7.1% |
Decennial US Census

As of the 2020 census there were 626 people, 298 households, and 219 families residing in the city. The population density was 168.64 inhabitants per square mile (65.11/km^{2}). There were 400 housing units at an average density of 107.76 per square mile (41.61/km^{2}). The racial makeup of the city was 91.21% White, 0.80% African American, 0.00% Native American, 0.64% Asian, 0.00% Pacific Islander, 0.00% from other races, and 7.35% from two or more races. Hispanic or Latino of any race were 1.76% of the population.

There were 298 households, out of which 26.2% had children under the age of 18 living with them, 61.07% were married couples living together, 9.73% had a female householder with no husband present, and 26.51% were non-families. 23.15% of all households were made up of individuals, and 13.42% had someone living alone who was 65 years of age or older. The average household size was 2.65 and the average family size was 2.26.

The city's age distribution consisted of 16.5% under the age of 18, 3.7% from 18 to 24, 16.6% from 25 to 44, 29.6% from 45 to 64, and 33.5% who were 65 years of age or older. The median age was 53.8 years. For every 100 females, there were 97.1 males. For every 100 females age 18 and over, there were 85.1 males.

The median income for a household in the city was $55,625, and the median income for a family was $86,250. Males had a median income of $55,417 versus $22,000 for females. The per capita income for the city was $37,330. About 16.4% of families and 20.4% of the population were below the poverty line, including 21.6% of those under age 18 and 10.2% of those age 65 or over.

== Economy ==
Grafton's main industry is tourism. The city is at the center of the region's bald eagle watching area and proudly calls itself "The Winter Home of The Bald Eagle." Main Street is lined with restaurants, antique, craft, and wine shops, which make Grafton a popular stopping place for bicyclists on the Sam Vadalabene Bike Trail or for visitors in search of fall foliage color and bald eagles. During the warmer months, visitors can take advantage of the two rivers with boating, canoeing and parasailing activities. There are two river ferries in the Grafton area that provide transportation to St. Charles County, Missouri and Calhoun County. Five miles west of Grafton is Pere Marquette State Park, which is Illinois' largest and most popular state park.

Grafton experienced modest economic growth from 2000 to 2010, including some new housing and restaurants, the Grafton Elementary School, the Grafton Harbor marina, and a lighthouse located along the Mississippi River.

== Culture ==
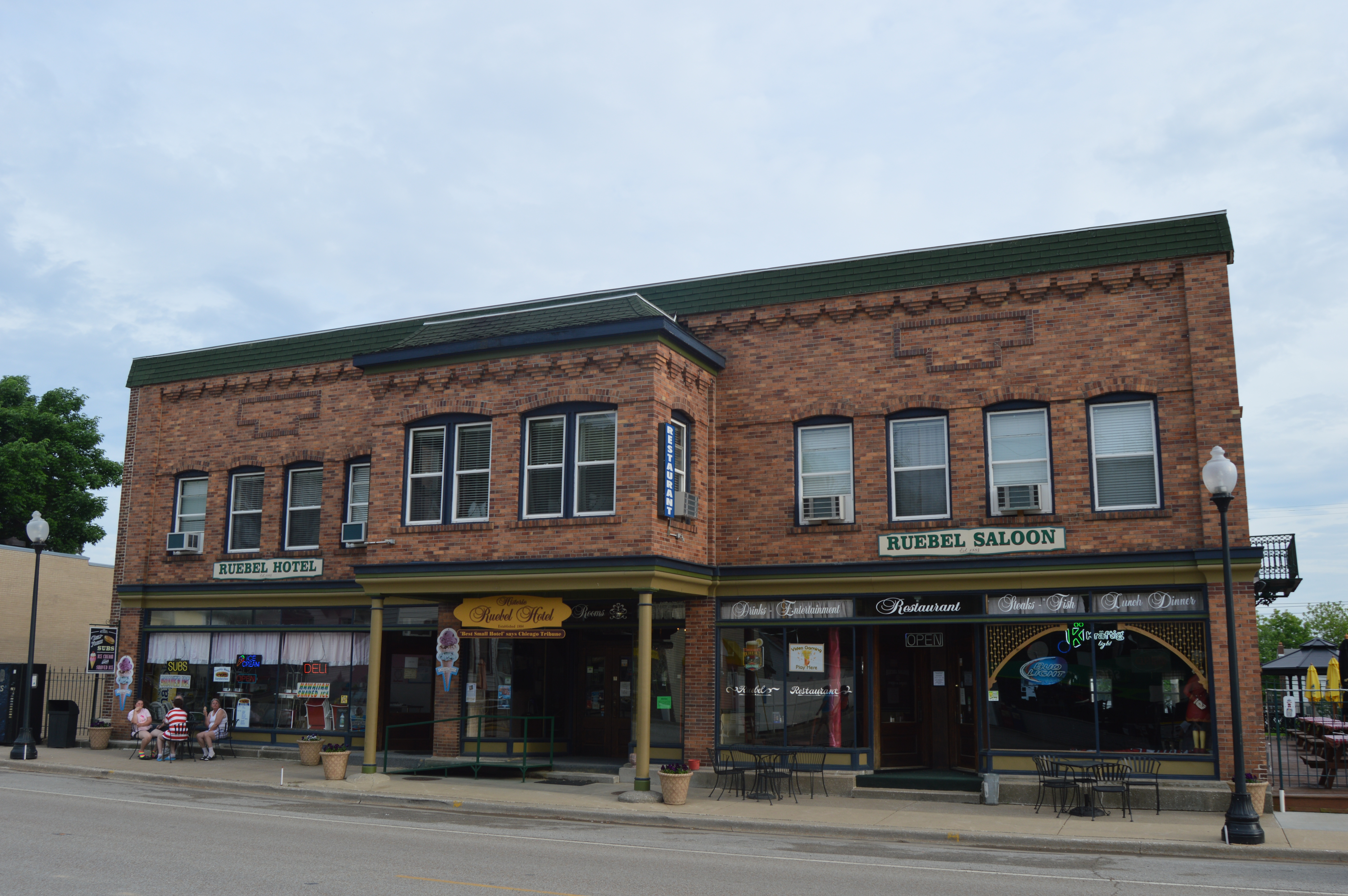
The Ruebel Hotel in Grafton

=== National Register of Historic Places ===
Grafton has seven places and sites that are listed on the National Register of Historic Places. The Grafton Historic District, Grafton Bank, the John and Amelia McClintock House, Ruebel Hotel, the Slaten-LaMarsh House, and the Paris Mason Building were all added in 1994. The Charles Brainerd House was added to the Register in 1998.

== Government ==
Grafton uses a city council form of government and consists of a mayor and six aldermen from three wards. The city's current mayor is Michael Morrow.

== Education ==
=== Public schools ===
Grafton is served by the public K-12 Jersey Community Unit School District 100. District schools in Grafton include Grafton Elementary School.

=== Colleges and universities ===
Nearby colleges and universities include Principia College, in Elsah, and Lewis and Clark Community College, in Godfrey.

== Infrastructure ==
=== Transportation ===
Illinois Route 100 runs along a west–east route through the city. It is part of the Great River Road and the Meeting of the Great Rivers Scenic Byway. Also, Illinois Route 3 has its northern terminus in Grafton at Illinois Route 100.

There are two ferries that serve Grafton. The Grafton Ferry takes travelers across the Mississippi River to St. Charles County, Missouri, while the Brussels Ferry takes travelers across the Illinois River to Calhoun County, Illinois.

=== Utilities ===
Utility companies serving Grafton are Ameren (natural gas and electricity), Grafton Telephone (landline telephone service and internet), and PC One Cable (cable television). Water services are no longer provided and maintained by the city and are currently purchased from another source.

== Notable people ==
- Ed Baecht, pitcher for the Philadelphia Phillies, Chicago Cubs and St. Louis Browns
- Lambert Redd, track star who won the silver medal in long jump at 1932 Olympics.
