= Jerseyville, Illinois =

- City
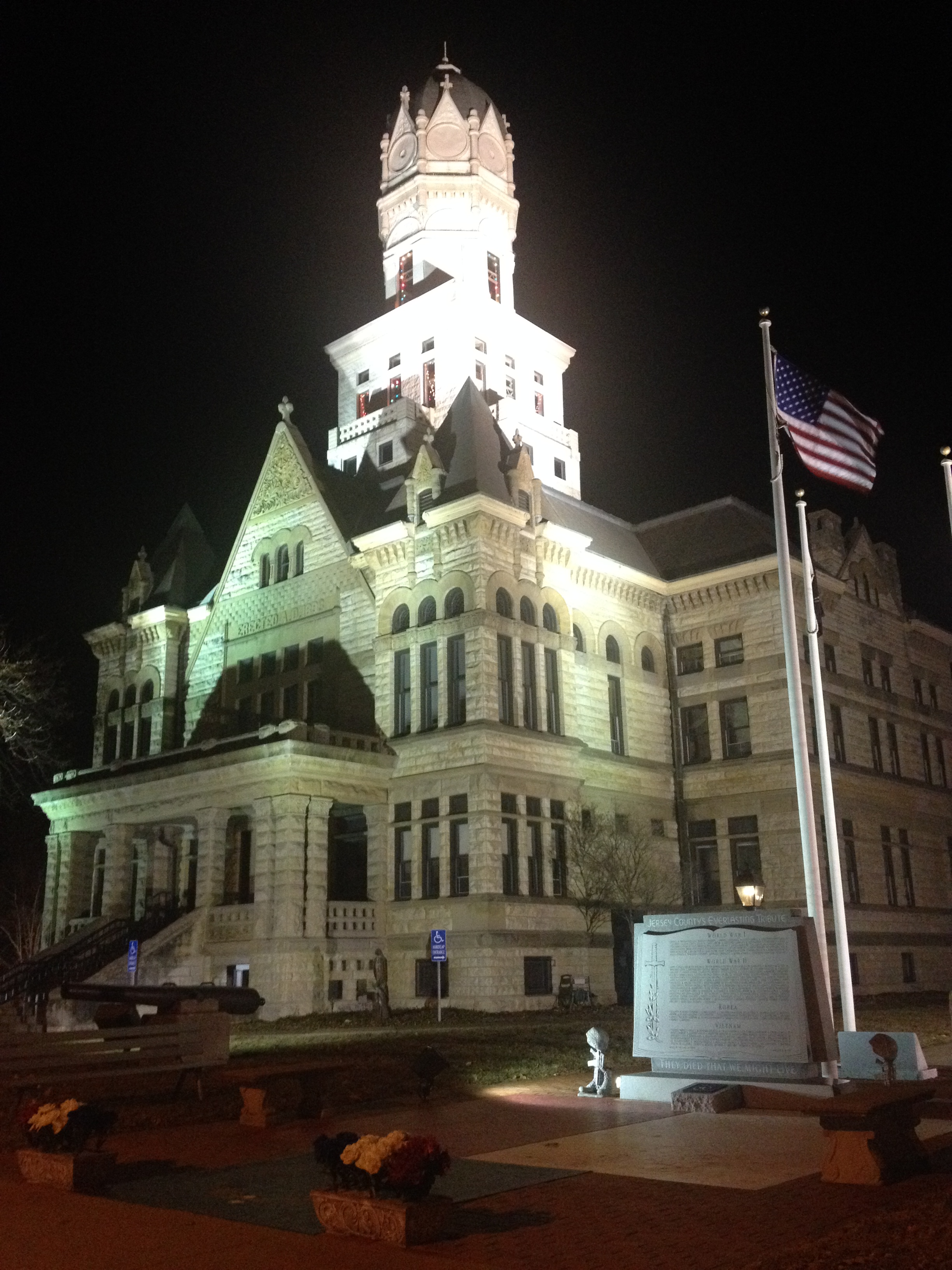
- Jersey County Courthouse, downtown
- Interactive map of Jerseyville, Illinois
- Location within Illinois Location within the United States
- Coordinates: 39°07′28″N 90°19′42″W
- Country: United States
- State: Illinois
- County: Jersey
- Township: Jersey
- Founded: 1827
- Incorporated Town: July 21, 1837
- City Charter: February 21, 1867

Government
  - Type: City commission

Area
  - Total: 5.24 sq mi (13.57 km^{2})
  - Land: 5.24 sq mi (13.56 km^{2})
  - Water: 0 sq mi (0.00 km^{2})
- Elevation: 656 ft (200 m)

Population (2020)
  - Total: 8,337
  - Density: 1,591.9/sq mi (614.64/km^{2})
- Time zone: UTC-6 (CST)
  - Summer (DST): UTC-5 (CDT)
- ZIP Code: 62052
- Area code: 618
- FIPS code: 17-38414
- GNIS feature ID: 2395467
- Website: www.jerseyville-il.us

Jerseyville is the largest city in and the county seat of Jersey County, Illinois, United States. At the 2020 census, the city had a total population of 8,337.

Jerseyville is a part of Southern Illinois, the Metro-East region and the St. Louis Metropolitan Statistical Area.

== History ==
In 1827, James Faulkner, a Pennsylvania native, and his family built a small framed structure that was named the "Little Red House," in the area that is now known as Jerseyville. The "Little Red House" served as the first stagecoach station, first tavern, first school, and first bank in the immediate area. By 1834, the small settlement that grew up around Faulkner's home, then known as Hickory Grove by its residents, was surveyed and platted by three immigrants from New Jersey, John Lott, Edward M. Daly Brandon F. Kennedy, and Mason A. Roberts. Lott and Daly's involvement marked the beginning of a proportionally large number of merchants, businessmen and settlers from New Jersey. A meeting was called in that same year at the "Little Red House" to vote for a town name, so a post office could be established. The name of Jerseyville was chosen to honor the native state of many of its inhabitants. In 1839, Jersey County was formed out of Greene County and Jerseyville was named as its county seat.

Jerseyville was a minor stopping point on the historic Underground Railroad before and during the Civil War. The "Little Red House" and a few other residences were utilized as stations for the Underground Railroad until the end of the Civil War, with some residences having false cellars that were used to hide slaves searching for freedom.

After the American Civil War ended, and the construction of the Alton & Chicago Railroad was completed, Jerseyville saw a period of commercial, industrial and urban growth. The first major period of growth in the city occurred from 1880 to 1916, and from that time to the present, Jerseyville's growth has since been steady and substantial. The majority of the commercial structures that are now located in the Downtown Historic District and Courthouse Square were built during the late 19th and early 20th centuries. It was also during this time that the present Jersey County Courthouse was built. The two-story, 124-foot-tall (38 m) Romanesque Revival building was completed in 1893, and is considered to be one of the most aesthetic courthouses in the area. Other nearby Victorian style buildings in the city include Queen Anne, Edwardian and Italianate architectural features, with several of these buildings having been recently renovated.

From 1912 to 1918, Jerseyville was the terminus of an interurban electric passenger railroad from Alton which was the stub of a project by the Alton, Jacksonville and Peoria Railway for a line to Peoria.

In recent decades, Jerseyville has been a testing ground in the agricultural biotechnology field. Bayer (formerly Monsanto) owns and operates a facility located just south of the city, which in 1987, was the site of the world's very first biotechnology field trial – first with tomatoes and later that year with soybeans. The facility was also home to the first triple stacked corn trial in 1998, which later became a part of one of Monsanto's top-selling products. The facility was further expanded in 2008, and now consists of sixteen greenhouses and almost 300 acres (120 ha) of land for field testing.

The Downtown Historic District is presently home to some antique stores and gift shops. Jerseyville also has some clothing and shoe stores, pharmacies, a public library, a post office, and several local restaurants and banks. Most of the growth that has occurred since the early 1990s has been in the southern and southwestern portions of the city, where new residential subdivisions and retail shopping centers have been built, and where numerous land annexations have been made by the city.

== Geography ==
According to the 2021 census gazetteer files, Jerseyville has a total area of 5.24 square miles (13.57 km^{2}), of which 5.24 square miles (13.57 km^{2}) (or 99.98%) is land and 0.00 square miles (0.00 km^{2}) (or 0.02%) is water.

=== Climate ===
Typically, the city's climate reflects most Midwest cities, located in the transitional zone between the humid continental climate type and the humid subtropical climate type (Köppen Dfa and Cfa, respectively), with neither large mountains nor large bodies of water to moderate its temperature. Spring is the wettest season and produces severe weather ranging from tornadoes to snow or ice storms. Summers are hot and humid, and the humidity often makes the heat index rise to temperatures feeling well above 100 °F (38 °C). Fall is mild with lower humidity and can produce intermittent bouts of heavy rainfall with the first snow flurries usually forming in late November. Winters can be cold at times with periodic light snow and temperatures below freezing.

In recent years, average temperatures in Jerseyville have ranged from a low of 19.2 °F (−7.1 °C) in January to a high of 86.5 °F (30.3 °C) in July. The record low temperature of −25 °F (−32 °C) was recorded in January 1977 and the record high temperature of 112 °F (44 °C) was recorded in July 1954. Average monthly precipitation ranges from 2.31 inches (59 mm) in February to 5.29 inches (134 mm) in May.

Climate data for Jerseyville 2 SW, Illinois (1991–2020 normals, extremes 1940–present)
Month	Jan	Feb	Mar	Apr	May	Jun	Jul	Aug	Sep	Oct	Nov	Dec	Year
Record high °F (°C)	74 (23)	82 (28)	93 (34)	92 (33)	96 (36)	104 (40)	112 (44)	105 (41)	102 (39)	93 (34)	84 (29)	76 (24)	112 (44)
Mean daily maximum °F (°C)	36.3 (2.4)	41.5 (5.3)	52.5 (11.4)	64.8 (18.2)	74.3 (23.5)	82.9 (28.3)	86.5 (30.3)	85.2 (29.6)	79.2 (26.2)	67.2 (19.6)	52.8 (11.6)	41.2 (5.1)	63.7 (17.6)
Daily mean °F (°C)	27.8 (−2.3)	32.2 (0.1)	42.2 (5.7)	53.4 (11.9)	64.1 (17.8)	72.8 (22.7)	76.2 (24.6)	74.2 (23.4)	66.9 (19.4)	55.2 (12.9)	42.9 (6.1)	32.7 (0.4)	53.4 (11.9)
Mean daily minimum °F (°C)	19.2 (−7.1)	22.8 (−5.1)	31.8 (−0.1)	42.1 (5.6)	53.8 (12.1)	62.8 (17.1)	66.0 (18.9)	63.3 (17.4)	54.7 (12.6)	43.3 (6.3)	33.0 (0.6)	24.2 (−4.3)	43.1 (6.2)
Record low °F (°C)	−25 (−32)	−22 (−30)	−11 (−24)	18 (−8)	28 (−2)	37 (3)	38 (3)	38 (3)	24 (−4)	17 (−8)	−2 (−19)	−19 (−28)	−25 (−32)
Average precipitation inches (mm)	2.45 (62)	2.31 (59)	3.17 (81)	4.55 (116)	5.29 (134)	4.12 (105)	3.56 (90)	3.72 (94)	3.44 (87)	3.29 (84)	3.67 (93)	2.65 (67)	42.22 (1,072)
Average snowfall inches (cm)	4.3 (11)	3.7 (9.4)	1.6 (4.1)	0.0 (0.0)	0.0 (0.0)	0.0 (0.0)	0.0 (0.0)	0.0 (0.0)	0.0 (0.0)	0.0 (0.0)	0.7 (1.8)	2.2 (5.6)	12.5 (32)
Average precipitation days (≥ 0.01 in)	7.7	7.3	9.7	10.8	12.2	9.2	7.5	7.3	6.8	8.2	8.7	7.9	103.3
Average snowy days (≥ 0.1 in)	2.4	1.8	0.8	0.0	0.0	0.0	0.0	0.0	0.0	0.0	0.5	1.6	7.1
Source: NOAA

== Demographics ==
Historical population
Census	Pop.	Note	%±
1850	760		—
1860	2,610		243.4%
1870	2,576		−1.3%
1880	2,894		12.3%
1890	3,207		10.8%
1900	3,517		9.7%
1910	4,116		17.0%
1920	3,839		−6.7%
1930	4,309		12.2%
1940	4,809		11.6%
1950	5,792		20.4%
1960	7,420		28.1%
1970	7,446		0.4%
1980	7,506		0.8%
1990	7,382		−1.7%
2000	7,984		8.2%
2010	8,465		6.0%
2020	8,337		−1.5%
Decennial US Census

=== 2020 census ===
As of the 2020 census, Jerseyville had a population of 8,337. The median age was 42.3 years. 22.0% of residents were under the age of 18 and 22.9% of residents were 65 years of age or older. For every 100 females there were 85.4 males, and for every 100 females age 18 and over there were 81.6 males age 18 and over.

98.3% of residents lived in urban areas, while 1.7% lived in rural areas.

There were 3,534 households and 1,805 families in Jerseyville, of which 27.7% had children under the age of 18 living in them. Of all households, 41.5% were married-couple households, 17.8% were households with a male householder and no spouse or partner present, and 34.1% were households with a female householder and no spouse or partner present. About 36.5% of all households were made up of individuals and 17.8% had someone living alone who was 65 years of age or older.

There were 3,845 housing units, of which 8.1% were vacant. The population density was 1,591.64 inhabitants per square mile (614.54/km^{2}). The homeowner vacancy rate was 2.7% and the rental vacancy rate was 7.6%.

Racial composition as of the 2020 census
Race	Number	Percent
White	7,831	93.9%
Black or African American	40	0.5%
American Indian and Alaska Native	4	0.0%
Asian	35	0.4%
Native Hawaiian and Other Pacific Islander	0	0.0%
Some other race	40	0.5%
Two or more races	387	4.6%
Hispanic or Latino (of any race)	122	1.5%

=== Income and poverty ===
The median income for a household in the city was $57,967, and the median income for a family was $89,757. Males had a median income of $42,951 versus $35,919 for females. The per capita income for the city was $29,205. About 4.9% of families and 10.5% of the population were below the poverty line, including 12.7% of those under age 18 and 6.9% of those age 65 or over.

== Culture ==
=== National Register of Historic Places ===
Jerseyville has five places and sites that are listed on the National Register of Historic Places. The Jersey County Courthouse and the Jerseyville Downtown Historic District were added in 1986. The Col. William H. Fulkerson Farmstead was added to the Register in 1998, and the Fisher-Chapman Farmstead was added in 2012. The Jerseyville First Presbyterian Church was added to the Register in 2021.

=== Media ===
Print / Online:

- Daily newspaper: The Telegraph - published out of Alton, but also covers the Jerseyville and Jersey County areas
- Weekly newspaper: The Jersey County Journal - distributed every Thursday and available online
- Weekly classifieds: The Jersey County Advantage - print only

Radio:

- WJBM 1480 kHz AM / 104.7 mHz FM - has a talk radio / country music format
- KXI70 162.450 mHz - NOAA Weather Radio

Jerseyville is also served by most stations in the St. Louis area market.

=== Recreation ===
The Jerseyville Parks and Recreation Department maintains and operates seven parks:

- Blackorby Athletic Field - Franklin Ave.
- Donor Park - June and Spruce St.
- Lions Club Park - Jefferson and Spruce St.
- Northmoor Park - Liberty St.
- Rotary Club Centennial Park - Liberty, Prairie, and Carpenter St. (Illinois Route 16)
- Wittman Park - Jefferson St.
- Wock Family Lake - June St. and Fidelity Rd.

The Donald W. Snyders Community Sports Complex is located on the southern side of the city on County Road, east of Jersey Community Middle School. The complex is made up of two baseball fields, two softball fields, one football field, outdoor oval track, and a concession stand. The complex, which is maintained by Jersey Community Unit School District 100, replaced the previous oval track and football field at Jersey Community High School, as the building was built on top of the field in 2005.

== Government ==
Jerseyville uses a city commission form of government, consisting of four commissioners and one mayor.

== Education ==
Jerseyville has a number of public and private schools. Public schools are part of Jersey Community Unit School District 100.

Elementary schools

- East Elementary School (Grades 2 through 4)
- West Elementary School (Grades Pre-K through 1st)
- Holy Ghost School (Grades Pre-K through 4)

Middle schools

- Jersey Community Middle School (Grades 5 through 7)
- St. Francis Xavier School (Grades 5 through 8)

High school

- Jersey Community High School (Grades 8th through 12th), Illinois

Both Holy Ghost and St. Francis Xavier Schools are private Roman Catholic schools.

Schools in Jerseyville had a total combined enrollment of 2,720 students.

Nearby colleges and universities include Principia College in Elsah, Lewis and Clark Community College in Godfrey and Southern Illinois University School of Dental Medicine in Alton.

== Religious organizations ==
Jerseyville is home to a number of religious organizations, consisting of both small and large congregations.

Churches that serve Jerseyville are listed here in alphabetical order:

- Church of the Nazarene
- Eastland Baptist Church
- Faith Temple Pentecostal Church
- First Assembly of God
- First Baptist Church
- First Church of Christ, Scientist
- First Presbyterian Church
- Gospel Assembly Church
- Grace Community Baptist Church
- Holy Ghost Church
- Hope Lutheran Church
- Jerseyville Church of Christ
- Jerseyville Methodist Church
- Kingdom Increase Church
- LifechurchX
- Open Door House of Praise
- Peace United Church of Christ
- St. Francis Xavier Catholic Church
- Victory Baptist Church

== Infrastructure ==
=== Transportation ===
Two major highways run through the city. US Highway 67 runs along a north–south route, while Illinois Route 16 runs along a west–east route. Also, Illinois Route 109 has its northern terminus in Jerseyville at US Highway 67.

A four-lane expansion of US Highway 67 in Jerseyville has been in the planning stages for years, and is currently in Illinois' five-year road construction plan. The plan includes the Jerseyville Bypass, which is expected to go around the eastern portion of the city when it is completed. Construction of the bypass has not started yet, but all of the work prior to actual road construction was scheduled to be completed by 2012. In nearby Delhi, an extension of the expressway was opened up to traffic in 2021. This is a part of the completion of the entire US Highway 67 four-lane project in Illinois between Godfrey and the Quad Cities area.

=== Utilities ===
Utility companies serving Jerseyville are Ameren (natural gas and electricity), Grafton Technologies and Frontier Communications (landline telephone service and internet), and Sparklight (cable television). Water and sewer services are provided and maintained by Illinois American Water.

== Notable people ==
- Kathie Conway, member of the Missouri House of Representatives
- Hugh W. Cross, (1896–1972) former Illinois Lieutenant Governor and member of the Illinois House of Representatives
- Russell E. Dunham, (1920–2009) World War II veteran and recipient of the Medal of Honor.
- Brent Hawkins, former professional football player for two teams
- Arthur Scott King, (1876–1957) noted physicist and astrophysicist
- Anthony L. Knapp, (1828–1881) US congressman and Illinois senator
- Robert M. Knapp, (1831–1889) US congressman and former mayor of Jerseyville
- Stan McGarvey, former NCAA Division II head football coach.
- Thomas J. Selby, (1840–1917) congressman and former mayor of Jerseyville
- Jim Watson, former member of the Illinois House of Representatives

== See also ==
- Jersey Community Hospital
- Oak Grove Cemetery (Jerseyville, Illinois)
