= List of municipalities in Illinois =

Map of the United States with Illinois highlighted

Illinois municipalities

Illinois is a state located in the Midwestern United States. According to the 2020 United States census, Illinois is the 6th most populous state with 12,812,508 inhabitants but the 24th largest by land area spanning 55,499.0 square miles (143,742 km^{2}) of land. Illinois is divided into 102 counties and, as of 2020, contained 1,300 municipalities consisting of cities, towns, and villages.

The most populous city is Chicago with 2,746,388 residents while the least populous is Valley City with 14 residents. The largest municipality by land area is Chicago, which spans 227.73 mi^{2} (589.8 km^{2}), while the smallest is Irwin at 0.045 mi^{2} (0.12 km^{2}).

== List ==
Most populous municipalities

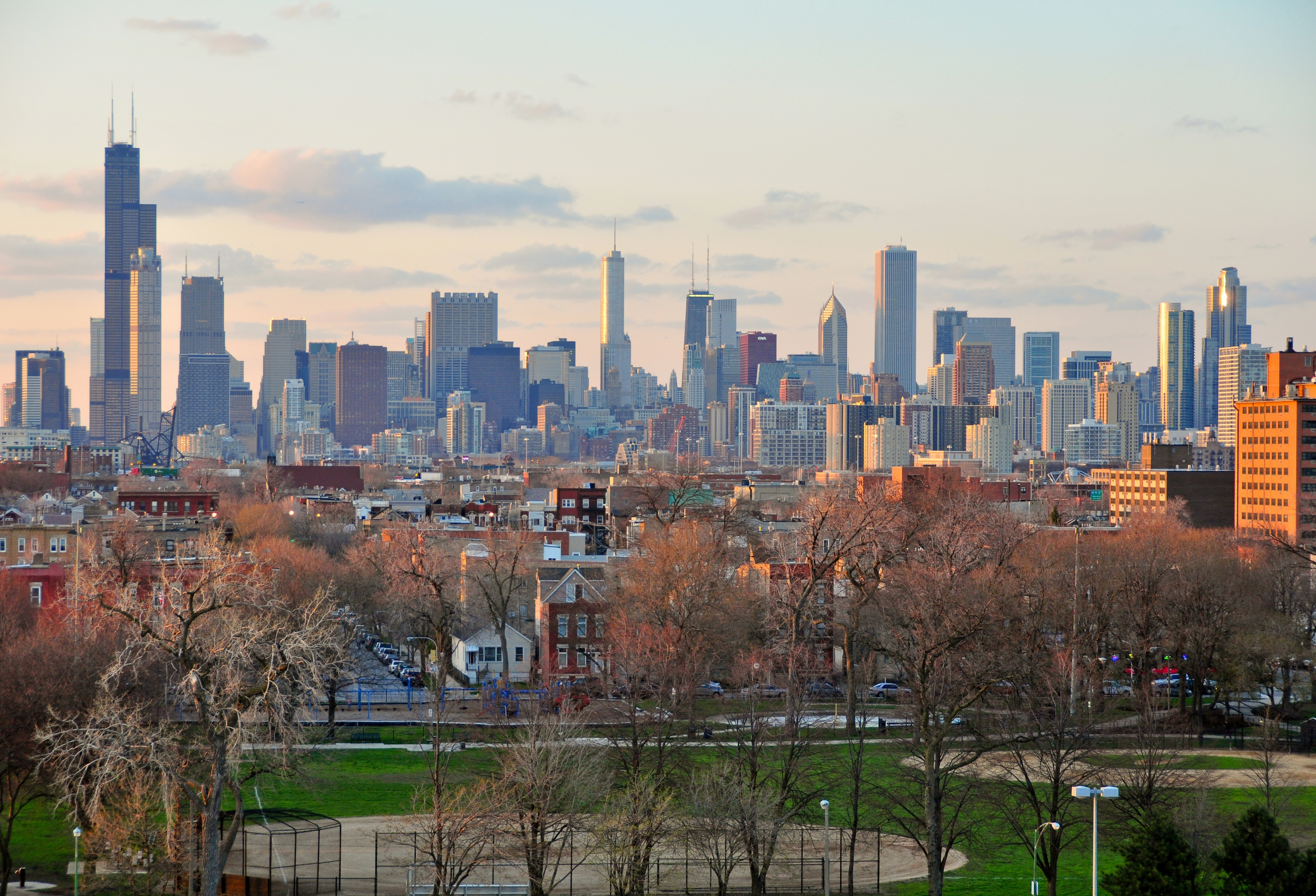
Chicago is Illinois' most populous municipality.

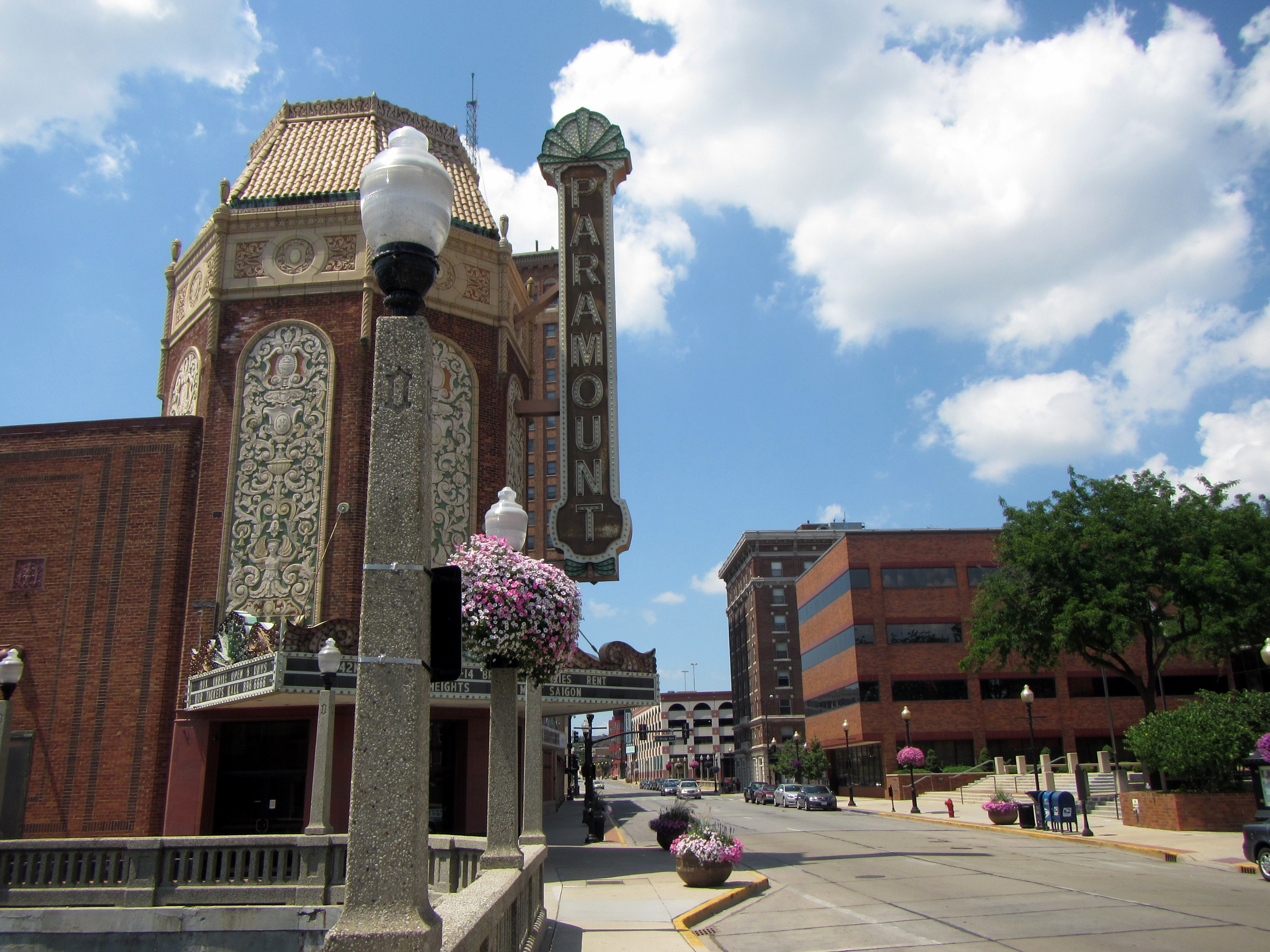
Paramount Theatre in Aurora, Illinois' second most populous municipality.

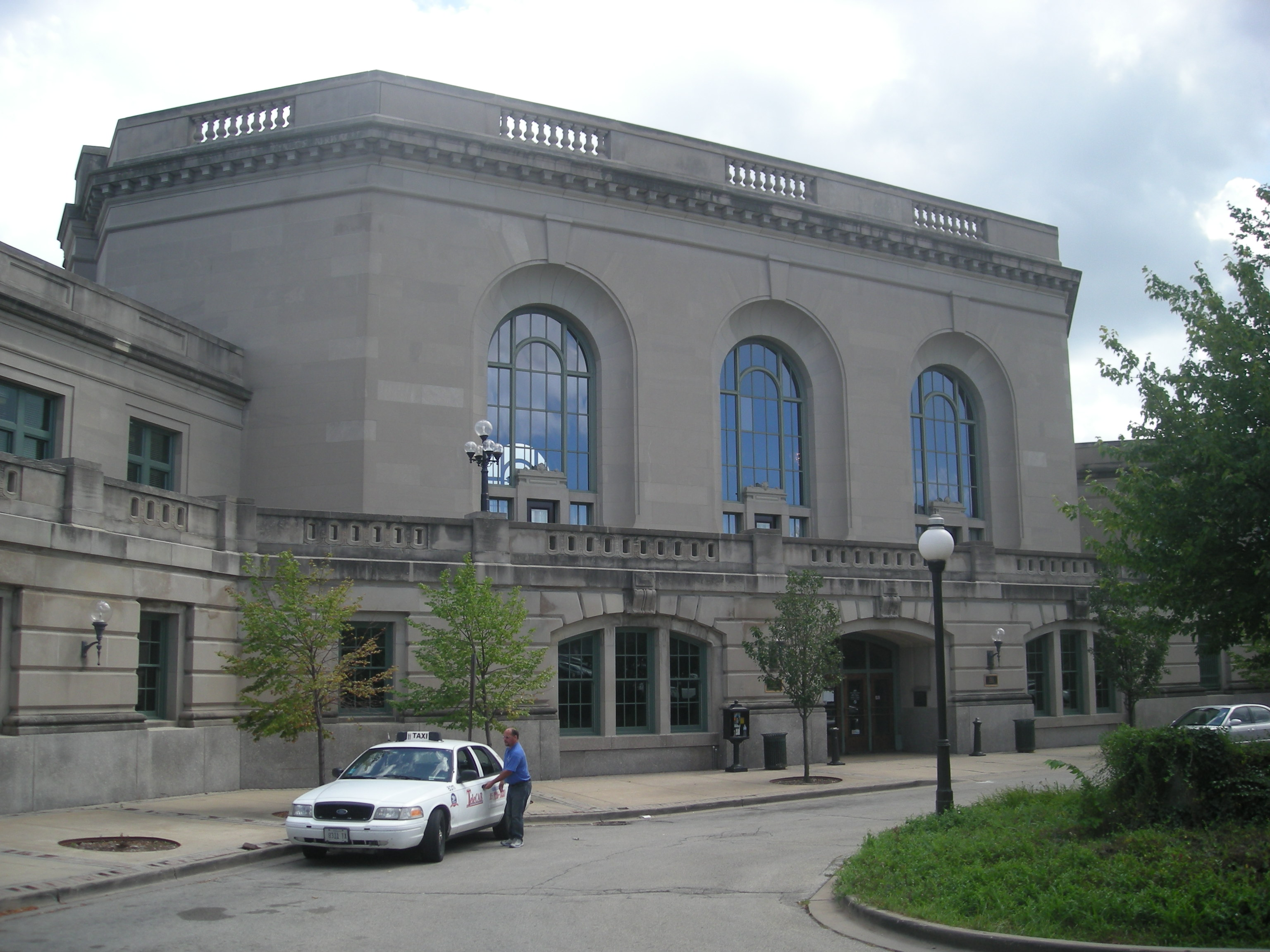
Union Station in Joliet, Illinois' third most populous municipality.

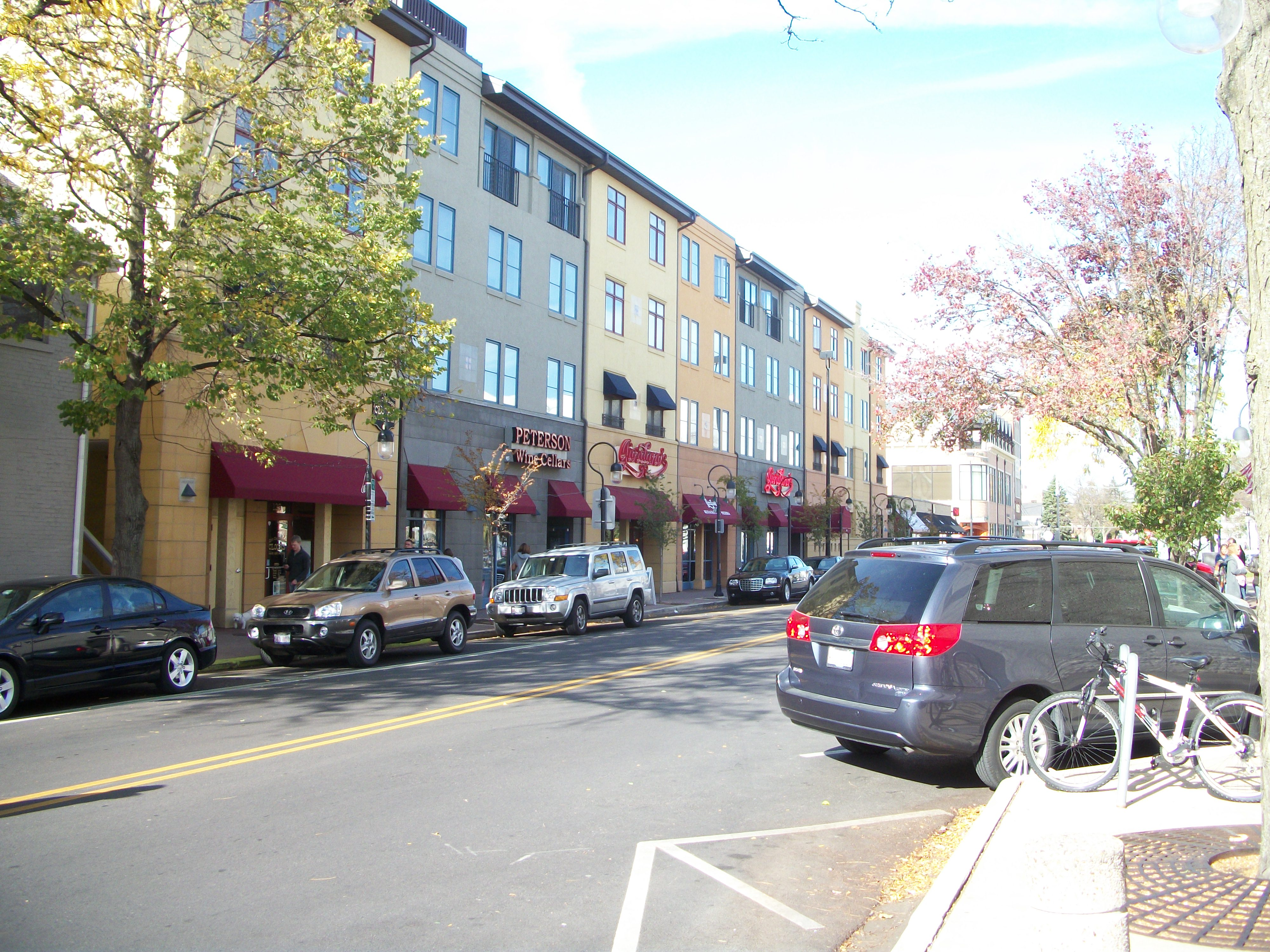
Downtown block in Naperville, Illinois' fourth most populous municipality.

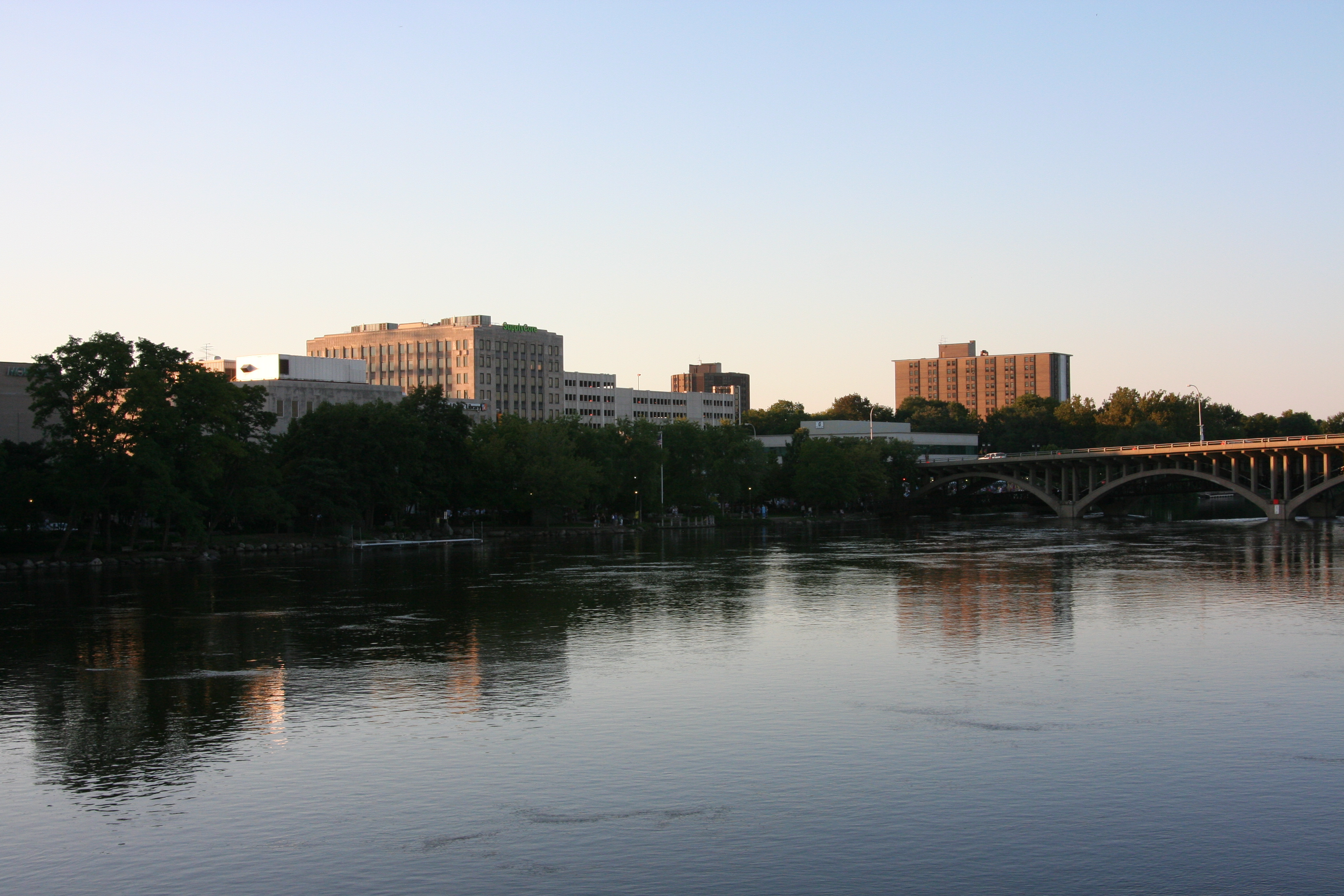
Skyline of Rockford, Illinois' fifth most populous municipality, as seen from the Rock River.

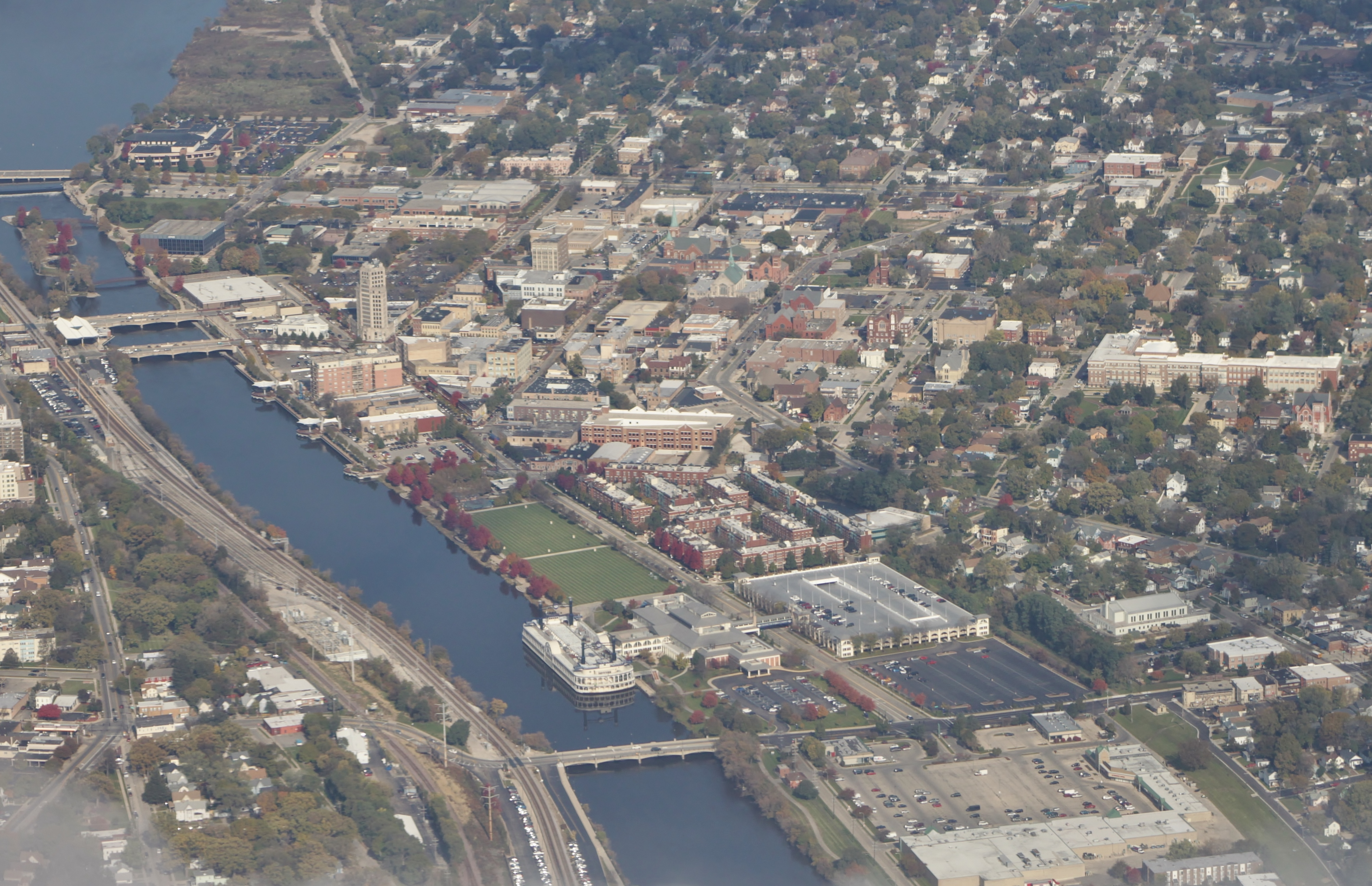
Aerial view of downtown Elgin, Illinois' sixth most populous municipality.

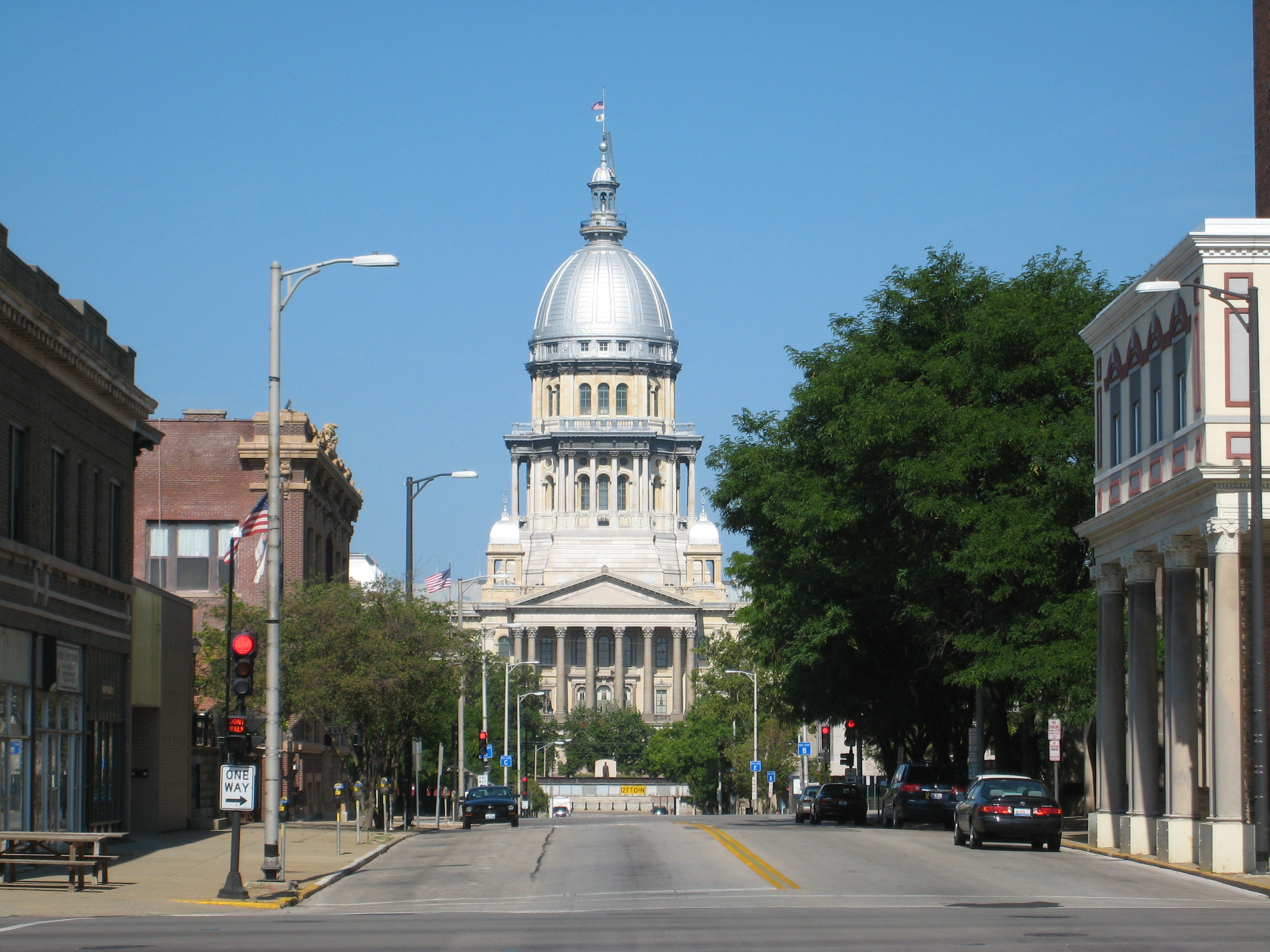
Illinois State Capitol in Springfield, Illinois' capital city and seventh most populous municipality.

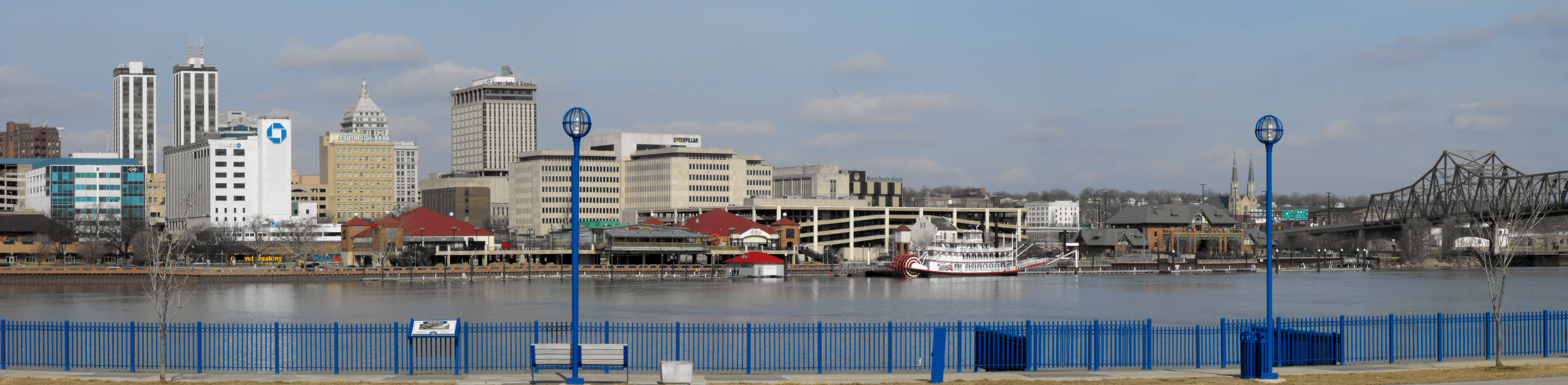
Skyline of Peoria, Illinois' eighth most populous municipality.

Key
†	County seat	‡	State capital

Name	Type	County(ies)	Population (2020)	Population (2010)	Change	Land area (2020)		Population density
Name	Type	County(ies)	Population (2020)	Population (2010)	Change	sq mi	km2	Population density
Abingdon	City	Knox	2,951	3,319	−11.1%	1.425	3.69	2,070.9/sq mi (799.6/km^{2})
Addieville	Village	Washington	259	252	+2.8%	0.993	2.57	260.8/sq mi (100.7/km^{2})
Addison	Village	DuPage	35,702	36,942	−3.4%	9.829	25.46	3,632.3/sq mi (1,402.4/km^{2})
Adeline	Village	Ogle	78	85	−8.2%	0.266	0.69	293.2/sq mi (113.2/km^{2})
Albany	Village	Whiteside	864	891	−3.0%	1.071	2.77	806.7/sq mi (311.5/km^{2})
Albers	Village	Clinton	1,121	1,190	−5.8%	0.846	2.19	1,325.1/sq mi (511.6/km^{2})
Albion†	City	Edwards	1,971	1,988	−0.9%	2.136	5.53	922.8/sq mi (356.3/km^{2})
Aledo†	City	Mercer	3,633	3,640	−0.2%	2.368	6.13	1,534.2/sq mi (592.4/km^{2})
Alexis	Village	Warren; Mercer	793	831	−4.6%	0.475	1.23	1,669.5/sq mi (644.6/km^{2})
Algonquin	Village	McHenry; Kane	29,700	30,046	−1.2%	12.302	31.86	2,414.2/sq mi (932.1/km^{2})
Alhambra	Village	Madison	622	681	−8.7%	0.756	1.96	822.8/sq mi (317.7/km^{2})
Allendale	Village	Wabash	458	475	−3.6%	0.307	0.80	1,491.9/sq mi (576.0/km^{2})
Allenville	Village	Moultrie	132	148	−10.8%	0.609	1.58	216.7/sq mi (83.7/km^{2})
Allerton	Village	Champaign	262	291	−10.0%	0.679	1.76	385.9/sq mi (149.0/km^{2})
Alma	Village	Marion	318	320	−0.6%	1.132	2.93	280.9/sq mi (108.5/km^{2})
Alpha	Village	Henry	675	671	+0.6%	0.309	0.80	2,184.5/sq mi (843.4/km^{2})
Alsey	Village	Scott	195	227	−14.1%	0.549	1.42	355.2/sq mi (137.1/km^{2})
Alsip	Village	Cook	19,063	19,277	−1.1%	6.525	16.90	2,921.5/sq mi (1,128.0/km^{2})
Altamont	City	Effingham	2,216	2,319	−4.4%	1.489	3.86	1,488.2/sq mi (574.6/km^{2})
Alton	City	Madison	25,676	27,865	−7.9%	15.681	40.61	1,637.4/sq mi (632.2/km^{2})
Altona	Village	Knox	463	531	−12.8%	0.938	2.43	493.6/sq mi (190.6/km^{2})
Alto Pass	Village	Union	319	391	−18.4%	2.134	5.53	149.5/sq mi (57.7/km^{2})
Alvin	Village	Vermilion	233	270	−13.7%	0.793	2.05	293.8/sq mi (113.4/km^{2})
Amboy	City	Lee	2,278	2,500	−8.9%	6.368	16.49	357.7/sq mi (138.1/km^{2})
Anchor	Village	McLean	163	146	+11.6%	0.171	0.44	953.2/sq mi (368.0/km^{2})
Andalusia	Village	Rock Island	1,184	1,178	+0.5%	1.175	3.04	1,007.7/sq mi (389.1/km^{2})
Andover	Village	Henry	555	578	−4.0%	0.991	2.57	560.0/sq mi (216.2/km^{2})
Anna	City	Union	4,303	4,442	−3.1%	3.558	9.22	1,209.4/sq mi (466.9/km^{2})
Annawan	Town	Henry	884	878	+0.7%	2.135	5.53	414.1/sq mi (159.9/km^{2})
Antioch	Village	Lake	14,622	14,430	+1.3%	8.213	21.27	1,780.3/sq mi (687.4/km^{2})
Apple River	Village	Jo Daviess	347	366	−5.2%	0.705	1.83	492.2/sq mi (190.0/km^{2})
Arcola	City	Douglas	2,927	2,916	+0.4%	2.023	5.24	1,446.9/sq mi (558.6/km^{2})
Arenzville	Village	Cass	367	409	−10.3%	0.768	1.99	477.9/sq mi (184.5/km^{2})
Argenta	Village	Macon	913	947	−3.6%	0.653	1.69	1,398.2/sq mi (539.8/km^{2})
Arlington	Village	Bureau	169	193	−12.4%	0.395	1.02	427.8/sq mi (165.2/km^{2})
Arlington Heights	Village	Cook	77,676	75,101	+3.4%	16.605	43.01	4,677.9/sq mi (1,806.1/km^{2})
Armington	Village	Tazewell	310	343	−9.6%	0.285	0.74	1,087.7/sq mi (420.0/km^{2})
Aroma Park	Village	Kankakee	664	743	−10.6%	1.882	4.87	352.8/sq mi (136.2/km^{2})
Arrowsmith	Village	McLean	276	294	−6.1%	0.197	0.51	1,401.0/sq mi (540.9/km^{2})
Arthur	Village	Douglas; Moultrie	2,231	2,288	−2.5%	1.337	3.46	1,668.7/sq mi (644.3/km^{2})
Ashkum	Village	Iroquois	750	761	−1.4%	0.835	2.16	898.2/sq mi (346.8/km^{2})
Ashland	Village	Cass	1,218	1,333	−8.6%	0.748	1.94	1,628.3/sq mi (628.7/km^{2})
Ashley	City	Washington	462	536	−13.8%	1.128	2.92	409.6/sq mi (158.1/km^{2})
Ashmore	Village	Coles	637	785	−18.9%	0.805	2.08	791.3/sq mi (305.5/km^{2})
Ashton	Village	Lee	967	972	−0.5%	0.670	1.74	1,443.3/sq mi (557.3/km^{2})
Assumption	City	Christian	1,155	1,168	−1.1%	0.990	2.56	1,166.7/sq mi (450.5/km^{2})
Astoria	Town	Fulton	929	1,141	−18.6%	0.586	1.52	1,585.3/sq mi (612.1/km^{2})
Athens	City	Menard	1,977	1,988	−0.6%	1.682	4.36	1,175.4/sq mi (453.8/km^{2})
Atkinson	Town	Henry	965	972	−0.7%	1.921	4.98	502.3/sq mi (194.0/km^{2})
Atlanta	City	Logan	1,669	1,692	−1.4%	1.249	3.23	1,336.3/sq mi (515.9/km^{2})
Atwood	Village	Douglas; Piatt	1,116	1,224	−8.8%	0.614	1.59	1,817.6/sq mi (701.8/km^{2})
Auburn	City	Sangamon	4,574	4,771	−4.1%	4.124	10.68	1,109.1/sq mi (428.2/km^{2})
Augusta	Village	Hancock	553	587	−5.8%	0.691	1.79	800.3/sq mi (309.0/km^{2})
Aurora	City	Kane; DuPage; Will; Kendall	180,542	197,899	−8.8%	45.023	116.61	4,010.0/sq mi (1,548.3/km^{2})
Ava	City	Jackson	553	654	−15.4%	1.057	2.74	523.2/sq mi (202.0/km^{2})
Aviston	Village	Clinton	2,340	1,945	+20.3%	1.600	4.14	1,462.5/sq mi (564.7/km^{2})
Avon	Village	Fulton	704	799	−11.9%	0.444	1.15	1,585.6/sq mi (612.2/km^{2})
Baldwin	Village	Randolph	314	373	−15.8%	0.666	1.72	471.5/sq mi (182.0/km^{2})
Banner	Village	Fulton	169	189	−10.6%	1.290	3.34	131.0/sq mi (50.6/km^{2})
Bannockburn	Village	Lake	1,013	1,583	−36.0%	2.028	5.25	499.5/sq mi (192.9/km^{2})
Bardolph	Village	McDonough	210	251	−16.3%	0.617	1.60	340.4/sq mi (131.4/km^{2})
Barrington	Village	Cook; Lake	10,722	10,327	+3.8%	4.608	11.93	2,326.8/sq mi (898.4/km^{2})
Barrington Hills	Village	Cook; McHenry; Lake; Kane	4,114	4,209	−2.3%	27.004	69.94	152.3/sq mi (58.8/km^{2})
Barry	City	Pike	1,303	1,318	−1.1%	1.432	3.71	909.9/sq mi (351.3/km^{2})
Bartelso	Village	Clinton	635	595	+6.7%	0.431	1.12	1,473.3/sq mi (568.9/km^{2})
Bartlett	Village	Cook; DuPage; Kane	41,105	41,208	−0.2%	15.726	40.73	2,613.8/sq mi (1,009.2/km^{2})
Bartonville	Village	Peoria	5,945	6,471	−8.1%	8.050	20.85	738.5/sq mi (285.1/km^{2})
Basco	Village	Hancock	80	98	−18.4%	0.222	0.57	360.4/sq mi (139.1/km^{2})
Batavia	City	Kane	26,098	26,045	+0.2%	10.616	27.50	2,458.4/sq mi (949.2/km^{2})
Batchtown	Village	Calhoun	170	214	−20.6%	1.863	4.83	91.3/sq mi (35.2/km^{2})
Bath	Village	Mason	279	333	−16.2%	0.365	0.95	764.4/sq mi (295.1/km^{2})
Baylis	Village	Pike	172	205	−16.1%	0.471	1.22	365.2/sq mi (141.0/km^{2})
Bay View Gardens	Village	Woodford	354	378	−6.3%	0.569	1.47	622.1/sq mi (240.2/km^{2})
Beach Park	Village	Lake	14,249	13,638	+4.5%	7.079	18.33	2,012.9/sq mi (777.2/km^{2})
Beardstown	City	Cass	5,951	6,123	−2.8%	3.619	9.37	1,644.4/sq mi (634.9/km^{2})
Beaverville	Village	Iroquois	306	362	−15.5%	0.275	0.71	1,112.7/sq mi (429.6/km^{2})
Beckemeyer	Village	Clinton	923	1,040	−11.3%	0.613	1.59	1,505.7/sq mi (581.4/km^{2})
Bedford Park	Village	Cook	602	580	+3.8%	5.934	15.37	101.4/sq mi (39.2/km^{2})
Beecher	Village	Will	4,713	4,359	+8.1%	2.728	7.07	1,727.6/sq mi (667.0/km^{2})
Beecher City	Village	Effingham	428	463	−7.6%	0.895	2.32	478.2/sq mi (184.6/km^{2})
Belgium	Village	Vermilion	358	404	−11.4%	0.434	1.12	824.9/sq mi (318.5/km^{2})
Belknap	Village	Johnson	88	104	−15.4%	1.057	2.74	83.3/sq mi (32.1/km^{2})
Belle Prairie City	Town	Hamilton	49	54	−9.3%	0.438	1.13	111.9/sq mi (43.2/km^{2})
Belle Rive	Village	Jefferson	309	361	−14.4%	1.026	2.66	301.2/sq mi (116.3/km^{2})
Belleville†	City	St. Clair	42,404	44,478	−4.7%	23.222	60.14	1,826.0/sq mi (705.0/km^{2})
Bellevue	Village	Peoria	1,878	1,978	−5.1%	2.224	5.76	844.4/sq mi (326.0/km^{2})
Bellflower	Village	McLean	346	357	−3.1%	0.361	0.93	958.4/sq mi (370.1/km^{2})
Bellmont	Village	Wabash	247	276	−10.5%	0.325	0.84	760.0/sq mi (293.4/km^{2})
Bellwood	Village	Cook	18,789	19,071	−1.5%	2.398	6.21	7,835.3/sq mi (3,025.2/km^{2})
Belvidere†	City	Boone	25,339	25,585	−1.0%	12.064	31.25	2,100.4/sq mi (811.0/km^{2})
Bement	Village	Piatt	1,484	1,730	−14.2%	0.778	2.02	1,907.5/sq mi (736.5/km^{2})
Benld	City	Macoupin	1,464	1,556	−5.9%	1.060	2.75	1,381.1/sq mi (533.3/km^{2})
Bensenville	Village	DuPage	18,813	18,352	+2.5%	5.530	14.32	3,402.0/sq mi (1,313.5/km^{2})
Benson	Village	Woodford	412	423	−2.6%	0.163	0.42	2,527.6/sq mi (975.9/km^{2})
Bentley	Town	Hancock	30	35	−14.3%	0.143	0.37	209.8/sq mi (81.0/km^{2})
Benton†	City	Franklin	6,709	7,087	−5.3%	5.480	14.19	1,224.3/sq mi (472.7/km^{2})
Berkeley	Village	Cook	5,338	5,209	+2.5%	1.402	3.63	3,807.4/sq mi (1,470.1/km^{2})
Berlin	Village	Sangamon	141	180	−21.7%	0.891	2.31	158.2/sq mi (61.1/km^{2})
Berwyn	City	Cook	57,250	56,657	+1.0%	3.904	10.11	14,664.4/sq mi (5,662.0/km^{2})
Bethalto	Village	Madison	9,310	9,521	−2.2%	7.591	19.66	1,226.5/sq mi (473.5/km^{2})
Bethany	Village	Moultrie	1,255	1,352	−7.2%	0.977	2.53	1,284.5/sq mi (496.0/km^{2})
Biggsville	Village	Henderson	300	304	−1.3%	0.337	0.87	890.2/sq mi (343.7/km^{2})
Big Rock	Village	Kane	1,104	1,126	−2.0%	4.318	11.18	255.7/sq mi (98.7/km^{2})
Bingham	Village	Fayette	60	83	−27.7%	0.274	0.71	219.0/sq mi (84.5/km^{2})
Bishop Hill	Village	Henry	113	128	−11.7%	0.532	1.38	212.4/sq mi (82.0/km^{2})
Bismarck	Village	Vermilion	582	579	+0.5%	0.743	1.92	783.3/sq mi (302.4/km^{2})
Blandinsville	Village	McDonough	569	651	−12.6%	0.875	2.27	650.3/sq mi (251.1/km^{2})
Bloomingdale	Village	DuPage	22,382	22,018	+1.7%	6.766	17.52	3,308.0/sq mi (1,277.2/km^{2})
Bloomington†	City	McLean	78,680	76,610	+2.7%	27.129	70.26	2,900.2/sq mi (1,119.8/km^{2})
Blue Island	City	Cook	22,558	23,706	−4.8%	4.071	10.54	5,541.1/sq mi (2,139.4/km^{2})
Blue Mound	Village	Macon	1,133	1,158	−2.2%	0.585	1.52	1,936.8/sq mi (747.8/km^{2})
Bluffs	Village	Scott	618	715	−13.6%	0.893	2.31	692.0/sq mi (267.2/km^{2})
Bluford	Village	Jefferson	630	688	−8.4%	1.561	4.04	403.6/sq mi (155.8/km^{2})
Bolingbrook	Village	Will; DuPage	73,922	73,366	+0.8%	24.845	64.35	2,975.3/sq mi (1,148.8/km^{2})
Bondville	Village	Champaign	388	443	−12.4%	0.251	0.65	1,545.8/sq mi (596.8/km^{2})
Bone Gap	Village	Edwards	181	246	−26.4%	0.583	1.51	310.5/sq mi (119.9/km^{2})
Bonfield	Village	Kankakee	351	382	−8.1%	0.492	1.27	713.4/sq mi (275.5/km^{2})
Bonnie	Village	Jefferson	374	397	−5.8%	1.275	3.30	293.3/sq mi (113.3/km^{2})
Bourbonnais	Village	Kankakee	18,164	18,631	−2.5%	9.312	24.12	1,950.6/sq mi (753.1/km^{2})
Bowen	Village	Hancock	464	494	−6.1%	0.428	1.11	1,084.1/sq mi (418.6/km^{2})
Braceville	Village	Grundy	724	793	−8.7%	3.111	8.06	232.7/sq mi (89.9/km^{2})
Bradford	Village	Stark	676	768	−12.0%	0.398	1.03	1,698.5/sq mi (655.8/km^{2})
Bradley	Village	Kankakee	15,419	15,895	−3.0%	6.932	17.95	2,224.3/sq mi (858.8/km^{2})
Braidwood	City	Will	6,194	6,191	0.0%	5.296	13.72	1,169.6/sq mi (451.6/km^{2})
Breese	City	Clinton	4,641	4,442	+4.5%	2.669	6.91	1,738.9/sq mi (671.4/km^{2})
Bridgeport	City	Lawrence	1,800	1,886	−4.6%	1.072	2.78	1,679.1/sq mi (648.3/km^{2})
Bridgeview	Village	Cook	17,027	16,446	+3.5%	4.133	10.70	4,119.8/sq mi (1,590.7/km^{2})
Brighton	Village	Macoupin; Jersey	2,221	2,254	−1.5%	1.921	4.98	1,156.2/sq mi (446.4/km^{2})
Brimfield	Village	Peoria	778	868	−10.4%	0.821	2.13	947.6/sq mi (365.9/km^{2})
Broadlands	Village	Champaign	316	349	−9.5%	0.322	0.83	981.4/sq mi (378.9/km^{2})
Broadview	Village	Cook	7,998	7,932	+0.8%	1.777	4.60	4,500.8/sq mi (1,737.8/km^{2})
Broadwell	Village	Logan	136	145	−6.2%	0.180	0.47	755.6/sq mi (291.7/km^{2})
Brocton	Village	Edgar	273	322	−15.2%	0.572	1.48	477.3/sq mi (184.3/km^{2})
Brookfield	Village	Cook	19,476	18,978	+2.6%	3.064	7.94	6,356.4/sq mi (2,454.2/km^{2})
Brooklyn	Village	St. Clair	649	749	−13.4%	0.811	2.10	800.2/sq mi (309.0/km^{2})
Brookport	City	Massac	725	984	−26.3%	0.653	1.69	1,110.3/sq mi (428.7/km^{2})
Broughton	Village	Hamilton	185	194	−4.6%	1.890	4.90	97.9/sq mi (37.8/km^{2})
Browning	Village	Schuyler	117	137	−14.6%	0.310	0.80	377.4/sq mi (145.7/km^{2})
Browns	Village	Edwards	139	134	+3.7%	0.290	0.75	479.3/sq mi (185.1/km^{2})
Brownstown	Village	Fayette	690	759	−9.1%	0.760	1.97	907.9/sq mi (350.5/km^{2})
Brussels	Village	Calhoun	116	141	−17.7%	0.558	1.45	207.9/sq mi (80.3/km^{2})
Bryant	Village	Fulton	168	220	−23.6%	0.248	0.64	677.4/sq mi (261.6/km^{2})
Buckingham	Village	Kankakee	244	300	−18.7%	0.251	0.65	972.1/sq mi (375.3/km^{2})
Buckley	Village	Iroquois	495	600	−17.5%	0.316	0.82	1,566.5/sq mi (604.8/km^{2})
Buckner	Village	Franklin	409	462	−11.5%	0.872	2.26	469.0/sq mi (181.1/km^{2})
Buda	Village	Bureau	482	538	−10.4%	1.014	2.63	475.3/sq mi (183.5/km^{2})
Buffalo	Village	Sangamon	447	503	−11.1%	0.345	0.89	1,295.7/sq mi (500.3/km^{2})
Buffalo Grove	Village	Cook; Lake	43,212	41,496	+4.1%	9.563	24.77	4,518.7/sq mi (1,744.7/km^{2})
Bull Valley	Village	McHenry	1,128	1,077	+4.7%	9.128	23.64	123.6/sq mi (47.7/km^{2})
Bulpitt	Village	Christian	212	222	−4.5%	0.069	0.18	3,072.5/sq mi (1,186.3/km^{2})
Buncombe	Village	Johnson	207	203	+2.0%	1.187	3.07	174.4/sq mi (67.3/km^{2})
Bunker Hill	City	Macoupin	1,630	1,774	−8.1%	1.274	3.30	1,279.4/sq mi (494.0/km^{2})
Burbank	City	Cook	29,439	28,925	+1.8%	4.170	10.80	7,059.7/sq mi (2,725.8/km^{2})
Bureau Junction	Village	Bureau	281	322	−12.7%	1.446	3.75	194.3/sq mi (75.0/km^{2})
Burlington	Village	Kane	535	618	−13.4%	6.855	17.75	78.0/sq mi (30.1/km^{2})
Burnham	Village	Cook	4,046	4,206	−3.8%	1.855	4.80	2,181.1/sq mi (842.1/km^{2})
Burnt Prairie	Village	White	36	52	−30.8%	0.076	0.20	473.7/sq mi (182.9/km^{2})
Burr Ridge	Village	DuPage; Cook	11,192	10,559	+6.0%	7.143	18.50	1,566.8/sq mi (605.0/km^{2})
Bush	Village	Williamson	241	275	−12.4%	0.455	1.18	529.7/sq mi (204.5/km^{2})
Bushnell	City	McDonough	2,718	3,117	−12.8%	2.117	5.48	1,283.9/sq mi (495.7/km^{2})
Butler	Village	Montgomery	164	180	−8.9%	0.596	1.54	275.2/sq mi (106.2/km^{2})
Byron	City	Ogle	3,784	3,753	+0.8%	4.650	12.04	813.8/sq mi (314.2/km^{2})
Cabery	Village	Ford; Kankakee	231	266	−13.2%	0.344	0.89	671.5/sq mi (259.3/km^{2})
Cahokia Heights (Note: Alorton, Cahokia, and Centreville merged to form the city of Cahokia Heights on May 6, 2021. Population figures in both 2010 and 2020 represent the sum of the three populations at that time.)	City	St. Clair	17,894	22,552	−20.7%	16.37	42.4	1,093.1/sq mi (422.0/km^{2})
Cairo†	City	Alexander	1,733	2,831	−38.8%	6.987	18.10	248.0/sq mi (95.8/km^{2})
Caledonia	Village	Boone	183	197	−7.1%	1.035	2.68	176.8/sq mi (68.3/km^{2})
Calhoun	Village	Richland	164	172	−4.7%	0.912	2.36	179.8/sq mi (69.4/km^{2})
Calumet City	City	Cook	36,033	37,042	−2.7%	7.181	18.60	5,017.8/sq mi (1,937.4/km^{2})
Calumet Park	Village	Cook	7,025	7,835	−10.3%	1.117	2.89	6,289.2/sq mi (2,428.3/km^{2})
Camargo	Village	Douglas	452	445	+1.6%	1.259	3.26	359.0/sq mi (138.6/km^{2})
Cambria	Village	Williamson	1,505	1,228	+22.6%	1.415	3.66	1,063.6/sq mi (410.7/km^{2})
Cambridge†	Village	Henry	2,086	2,160	−3.4%	1.991	5.16	1,047.7/sq mi (404.5/km^{2})
Camden	Village	Schuyler	62	86	−27.9%	0.761	1.97	81.5/sq mi (31.5/km^{2})
Campbell Hill	Village	Jackson	309	336	−8.0%	0.462	1.20	668.8/sq mi (258.2/km^{2})
Camp Point	Village	Adams	1,121	1,132	−1.0%	1.134	2.94	988.5/sq mi (381.7/km^{2})
Campton Hills	Village	Kane	10,885	11,131	−2.2%	16.890	43.74	644.5/sq mi (248.8/km^{2})
Campus	Village	Livingston	149	166	−10.2%	0.092	0.24	1,619.6/sq mi (625.3/km^{2})
Canton	City	Fulton	13,242	14,704	−9.9%	7.858	20.35	1,685.2/sq mi (650.6/km^{2})
Cantrall	Village	Sangamon	144	139	+3.6%	0.250	0.65	576.0/sq mi (222.4/km^{2})
Capron	Village	Boone	1,395	1,376	+1.4%	0.768	1.99	1,816.4/sq mi (701.3/km^{2})
Carbon Cliff	Village	Rock Island	1,846	2,134	−13.5%	2.095	5.43	881.1/sq mi (340.2/km^{2})
Carbondale	City	Jackson	21,857	25,902	−15.6%	17.397	45.06	1,256.4/sq mi (485.1/km^{2})
Carbon Hill	Village	Grundy	372	345	+7.8%	0.178	0.46	2,089.9/sq mi (806.9/km^{2})
Carlinville†	City	Macoupin	5,710	5,917	−3.5%	3.369	8.73	1,694.9/sq mi (654.4/km^{2})
Carlock	Village	McLean	548	552	−0.7%	0.395	1.02	1,387.3/sq mi (535.7/km^{2})
Carlyle†	City	Clinton	3,253	3,281	−0.9%	3.425	8.87	949.8/sq mi (366.7/km^{2})
Carmi†	City	White	4,865	5,240	−7.2%	2.589	6.71	1,879.1/sq mi (725.5/km^{2})
Carol Stream	Village	DuPage	39,854	39,711	+0.4%	9.119	23.62	4,370.4/sq mi (1,687.4/km^{2})
Carpentersville	Village	Kane	37,983	37,691	+0.8%	7.883	20.42	4,818.3/sq mi (1,860.4/km^{2})
Carrier Mills	Village	Saline	1,672	1,653	+1.1%	1.208	3.13	1,384.1/sq mi (534.4/km^{2})
Carrollton†	City	Greene	2,485	2,484	0.0%	1.902	4.93	1,306.5/sq mi (504.4/km^{2})
Carterville	City	Williamson	5,848	5,496	+6.4%	5.266	13.64	1,110.5/sq mi (428.8/km^{2})
Carthage†	City	Hancock	2,490	2,605	−4.4%	2.491	6.45	999.6/sq mi (385.9/km^{2})
Cary	Village	McHenry	17,826	18,271	−2.4%	6.232	16.14	2,860.4/sq mi (1,104.4/km^{2})
Casey	City	Clark; Cumberland	2,404	2,769	−13.2%	2.263	5.86	1,062.3/sq mi (410.2/km^{2})
Caseyville	Village	St. Clair	4,400	4,245	+3.7%	7.266	18.82	605.6/sq mi (233.8/km^{2})
Catlin	Village	Vermilion	1,983	2,040	−2.8%	0.849	2.20	2,335.7/sq mi (901.8/km^{2})
Cave-In-Rock	Village	Hardin	228	318	−28.3%	0.374	0.97	609.6/sq mi (235.4/km^{2})
Cedar Point	Village	LaSalle	266	277	−4.0%	1.021	2.64	260.5/sq mi (100.6/km^{2})
Cedarville	Village	Stephenson	663	741	−10.5%	0.459	1.19	1,444.4/sq mi (557.7/km^{2})
Central City	Village	Marion	1,098	1,172	−6.3%	0.565	1.46	1,943.4/sq mi (750.3/km^{2})
Centralia	City	Marion; Clinton; Jefferson; Washington	12,182	13,032	−6.5%	8.200	21.24	1,485.6/sq mi (573.6/km^{2})
Cerro Gordo	Village	Piatt	1,316	1,403	−6.2%	0.729	1.89	1,805.2/sq mi (697.0/km^{2})
Chadwick	Village	Carroll	481	551	−12.7%	0.311	0.81	1,546.6/sq mi (597.2/km^{2})
Champaign	City	Champaign	88,302	81,055	+8.9%	22.928	59.38	3,851.3/sq mi (1,487.0/km^{2})
Chandlerville	Village	Cass	527	553	−4.7%	0.794	2.06	663.7/sq mi (256.3/km^{2})
Channahon	Village	Will; Grundy	13,383	12,560	+6.6%	15.622	40.46	856.7/sq mi (330.8/km^{2})
Chapin	Village	Morgan	475	512	−7.2%	0.998	2.58	476.0/sq mi (183.8/km^{2})
Charleston†	City	Coles	17,286	21,838	−20.8%	8.884	23.01	1,945.7/sq mi (751.3/km^{2})
Chatham	Village	Sangamon	14,377	11,500	+25.0%	7.364	19.07	1,952.3/sq mi (753.8/km^{2})
Chatsworth	Town	Livingston	1,185	1,205	−1.7%	2.757	7.14	429.8/sq mi (166.0/km^{2})
Chebanse	Village	Kankakee; Iroquois	1,044	1,062	−1.7%	1.190	3.08	877.3/sq mi (338.7/km^{2})
Chenoa	City	McLean	1,720	1,785	−3.6%	2.430	6.29	707.8/sq mi (273.3/km^{2})
Cherry	Village	Bureau	435	482	−9.8%	0.514	1.33	846.3/sq mi (326.8/km^{2})
Cherry Valley	Village	Winnebago	2,905	3,162	−8.1%	8.405	21.77	345.6/sq mi (133.4/km^{2})
Chester†	City	Randolph	6,814	8,586	−20.6%	5.806	15.04	1,173.6/sq mi (453.1/km^{2})
Chesterfield	Village	Macoupin	170	188	−9.6%	0.541	1.40	314.2/sq mi (121.3/km^{2})
Chicago†	City	Cook; DuPage	2,746,388	2,695,598	+1.9%	227.73	589.8	12,059.8/sq mi (4,656.3/km^{2})
Chicago Heights	City	Cook	27,480	30,276	−9.2%	10.283	26.63	2,672.4/sq mi (1,031.8/km^{2})
Chicago Ridge	Village	Cook	14,433	14,305	+0.9%	2.268	5.87	6,363.8/sq mi (2,457.1/km^{2})
Chillicothe	City	Peoria	6,128	6,097	+0.5%	5.274	13.66	1,161.9/sq mi (448.6/km^{2})
Chrisman	City	Edgar	1,312	1,343	−2.3%	0.719	1.86	1,824.8/sq mi (704.5/km^{2})
Christopher	City	Franklin	2,697	2,382	+13.2%	1.622	4.20	1,662.8/sq mi (642.0/km^{2})
Cicero	Town	Cook	85,268	83,891	+1.6%	5.865	15.19	14,538.4/sq mi (5,613.3/km^{2})
Cisco	Village	Piatt	254	261	−2.7%	0.182	0.47	1,395.6/sq mi (538.8/km^{2})
Cisne	Village	Wayne	634	672	−5.7%	0.630	1.63	1,006.3/sq mi (388.6/km^{2})
Cissna Park	Village	Iroquois	817	846	−3.4%	0.725	1.88	1,126.9/sq mi (435.1/km^{2})
Claremont	Village	Richland	161	176	−8.5%	0.793	2.05	203.0/sq mi (78.4/km^{2})
Clarendon Hills	Village	DuPage	8,702	8,427	+3.3%	1.810	4.69	4,807.7/sq mi (1,856.3/km^{2})
Clay City	Village	Clay	847	959	−11.7%	1.782	4.62	475.3/sq mi (183.5/km^{2})
Clayton	Village	Adams	639	709	−9.9%	0.884	2.29	722.9/sq mi (279.1/km^{2})
Clear Lake (Note: Clearlake Village was dissolved by referendum in April of 2022, and its assets and property passed to Clear Lake Township.)	Village	Sangamon	203	229	−11.4%	0.092	0.24	2,206.5/sq mi (851.9/km^{2})
Cleveland	Village	Henry	163	188	−13.3%	0.294	0.76	554.4/sq mi (214.1/km^{2})
Clifton	Village	Iroquois	1,352	1,468	−7.9%	0.930	2.41	1,453.8/sq mi (561.3/km^{2})
Clinton†	City	De Witt	7,004	7,225	−3.1%	3.572	9.25	1,960.8/sq mi (757.1/km^{2})
Coal City	Village	Grundy	5,705	5,587	+2.1%	5.617	14.55	1,015.7/sq mi (392.2/km^{2})
Coalton	Village	Montgomery	317	304	+4.3%	0.530	1.37	598.1/sq mi (230.9/km^{2})
Coal Valley	Village	Rock Island; Henry	3,873	3,743	+3.5%	3.112	8.06	1,244.5/sq mi (480.5/km^{2})
Coatsburg	Village	Adams	150	147	+2.0%	0.132	0.34	1,136.4/sq mi (438.8/km^{2})
Cobden	Village	Union	1,074	1,157	−7.2%	1.219	3.16	881.1/sq mi (340.2/km^{2})
Coffeen	City	Montgomery	647	685	−5.5%	1.161	3.01	557.3/sq mi (215.2/km^{2})
Colchester	City	McDonough	1,108	1,401	−20.9%	1.150	2.98	963.5/sq mi (372.0/km^{2})
Coleta	Village	Whiteside	167	164	+1.8%	0.370	0.96	451.4/sq mi (174.3/km^{2})
Colfax	Village	McLean	996	1,061	−6.1%	0.553	1.43	1,801.1/sq mi (695.4/km^{2})
Collinsville	City	Madison; St. Clair	24,366	25,579	−4.7%	15.077	39.05	1,616.1/sq mi (624.0/km^{2})
Colona	City	Henry	5,045	5,099	−1.1%	3.818	9.89	1,321.4/sq mi (510.2/km^{2})
Colp	Village	Williamson	168	225	−25.3%	0.134	0.35	1,253.7/sq mi (484.1/km^{2})
Columbia	City	Monroe; St. Clair	10,999	9,707	+13.3%	10.303	26.68	1,067.6/sq mi (412.2/km^{2})
Columbus	Village	Adams	114	99	+15.2%	0.219	0.57	520.5/sq mi (201.0/km^{2})
Compton	Village	Lee	274	303	−9.6%	0.158	0.41	1,734.2/sq mi (669.6/km^{2})
Concord	Village	Morgan	150	167	−10.2%	0.249	0.64	602.4/sq mi (232.6/km^{2})
Congerville	Village	Woodford	497	474	+4.9%	0.963	2.49	516.1/sq mi (199.3/km^{2})
Cooksville	Village	McLean	157	182	−13.7%	0.217	0.56	723.5/sq mi (279.3/km^{2})
Cordova	Village	Rock Island	671	672	−0.1%	0.574	1.49	1,169.0/sq mi (451.3/km^{2})
Cornell	Village	Livingston	446	467	−4.5%	0.654	1.69	682.0/sq mi (263.3/km^{2})
Cortland	Town	DeKalb	4,398	4,270	+3.0%	3.649	9.45	1,205.3/sq mi (465.4/km^{2})
Coulterville	Village	Randolph	834	945	−11.7%	0.569	1.47	1,465.7/sq mi (565.9/km^{2})
Country Club Hills	City	Cook	16,775	16,541	+1.4%	4.970	12.87	3,375.3/sq mi (1,303.2/km^{2})
Countryside	City	Cook	6,420	5,895	+8.9%	2.878	7.45	2,230.7/sq mi (861.3/km^{2})
Cowden	Village	Shelby	515	629	−18.1%	0.402	1.04	1,281.1/sq mi (494.6/km^{2})
Crainville	Village	Williamson	1,443	1,254	+15.1%	1.653	4.28	873.0/sq mi (337.1/km^{2})
Creal Springs	City	Williamson	505	543	−7.0%	1.027	2.66	491.7/sq mi (189.9/km^{2})
Crescent City	Village	Iroquois	552	615	−10.2%	0.456	1.18	1,210.5/sq mi (467.4/km^{2})
Crest Hill	City	Will	20,459	20,837	−1.8%	9.052	23.44	2,260.2/sq mi (872.7/km^{2})
Creston	Village	Ogle	627	662	−5.3%	1.146	2.97	547.1/sq mi (211.2/km^{2})
Crestwood	Village	Cook	10,826	10,950	−1.1%	3.049	7.90	3,550.7/sq mi (1,370.9/km^{2})
Crete	Village	Will	8,465	8,259	+2.5%	9.409	24.37	899.7/sq mi (347.4/km^{2})
Creve Coeur	Village	Tazewell	4,934	5,451	−9.5%	4.231	10.96	1,166.2/sq mi (450.3/km^{2})
Crossville	Village	White	623	745	−16.4%	0.640	1.66	973.4/sq mi (375.8/km^{2})
Crystal Lake	City	McHenry	40,269	40,743	−1.2%	18.918	49.00	2,128.6/sq mi (821.9/km^{2})
Cuba	City	Fulton	1,184	1,294	−8.5%	0.543	1.41	2,180.5/sq mi (841.9/km^{2})
Cullom	Village	Livingston	520	555	−6.3%	0.335	0.87	1,552.2/sq mi (599.3/km^{2})
Curran	Village	Sangamon	213	212	+0.5%	1.975	5.12	107.8/sq mi (41.6/km^{2})
Cutler	Village	Perry	361	441	−18.1%	0.468	1.21	771.4/sq mi (297.8/km^{2})
Cypress	Village	Johnson	217	234	−7.3%	0.753	1.95	288.2/sq mi (111.3/km^{2})
Dahlgren	Village	Hamilton	504	525	−4.0%	1.017	2.63	495.6/sq mi (191.3/km^{2})
Dakota	Village	Stephenson	500	506	−1.2%	0.249	0.64	2,008.0/sq mi (775.3/km^{2})
Dallas City	City	Hancock; Henderson	805	945	−14.8%	2.374	6.15	339.1/sq mi (130.9/km^{2})
Dalton City	Village	Moultrie	454	544	−16.5%	0.534	1.38	850.2/sq mi (328.3/km^{2})
Dalzell	Village	Bureau	663	717	−7.5%	0.820	2.12	808.5/sq mi (312.2/km^{2})
Damiansville	Village	Clinton	564	491	+14.9%	0.822	2.13	686.1/sq mi (264.9/km^{2})
Dana	Village	LaSalle	162	159	+1.9%	0.220	0.57	736.4/sq mi (284.3/km^{2})
Danforth	Village	Iroquois	594	604	−1.7%	0.478	1.24	1,242.7/sq mi (479.8/km^{2})
Danvers	Village	McLean	1,089	1,154	−5.6%	0.803	2.08	1,356.2/sq mi (523.6/km^{2})
Danville†	City	Vermilion	29,204	33,027	−11.6%	17.856	46.25	1,635.5/sq mi (631.5/km^{2})
Darien	City	DuPage	22,011	22,086	−0.3%	6.171	15.98	3,566.8/sq mi (1,377.2/km^{2})
Davis	Village	Stephenson	589	677	−13.0%	0.405	1.05	1,454.3/sq mi (561.5/km^{2})
Davis Junction	Village	Ogle	2,512	2,373	+5.9%	4.200	10.88	598.1/sq mi (230.9/km^{2})
Dawson	Village	Sangamon	519	509	+2.0%	0.792	2.05	655.3/sq mi (253.0/km^{2})
Decatur†	City	Macon	70,522	76,122	−7.4%	42.894	111.09	1,644.1/sq mi (634.8/km^{2})
Deer Creek	Village	Tazewell	667	704	−5.3%	0.535	1.39	1,246.7/sq mi (481.4/km^{2})
Deerfield	Village	Lake; Cook	19,196	18,225	+5.3%	5.528	14.32	3,472.5/sq mi (1,340.7/km^{2})
Deer Grove	Village	Whiteside	38	48	−20.8%	0.411	1.06	92.5/sq mi (35.7/km^{2})
Deer Park	Village	Lake; Cook	3,681	3,200	+15.0%	3.654	9.46	1,007.4/sq mi (389.0/km^{2})
DeKalb	City	DeKalb	40,290	43,862	−8.1%	16.150	41.83	2,494.7/sq mi (963.2/km^{2})
De Land	Village	Piatt	447	446	+0.2%	0.424	1.10	1,054.2/sq mi (407.0/km^{2})
Delavan	City	Tazewell	1,568	1,689	−7.2%	1.440	3.73	1,088.9/sq mi (420.4/km^{2})
De Pue	Village	Bureau	1,633	1,838	−11.2%	2.775	7.19	588.5/sq mi (227.2/km^{2})
De Soto	Village	Jackson	1,407	1,590	−11.5%	0.912	2.36	1,542.8/sq mi (595.7/km^{2})
Des Plaines	City	Cook	60,675	58,364	+4.0%	14.238	36.88	4,261.5/sq mi (1,645.4/km^{2})
Detroit	Village	Pike	76	83	−8.4%	0.251	0.65	302.8/sq mi (116.9/km^{2})
De Witt	Village	De Witt	160	184	−13.0%	0.237	0.61	675.1/sq mi (260.7/km^{2})
Diamond	Village	Grundy; Will	2,640	2,527	+4.5%	1.900	4.92	1,389.5/sq mi (536.5/km^{2})
Dieterich	Village	Effingham	890	617	+44.2%	1.366	3.54	651.5/sq mi (251.6/km^{2})
Divernon	Village	Sangamon	1,139	1,172	−2.8%	0.763	1.98	1,492.8/sq mi (576.4/km^{2})
Dix	Village	Jefferson	469	461	+1.7%	2.074	5.37	226.1/sq mi (87.3/km^{2})
Dixmoor	Village	Cook	2,973	3,644	−18.4%	1.249	3.23	2,380.3/sq mi (919.0/km^{2})
Dixon†	City	Lee	15,274	15,733	−2.9%	7.752	20.08	1,970.3/sq mi (760.7/km^{2})
Dolton	Village	Cook	21,426	23,153	−7.5%	4.571	11.84	4,687.4/sq mi (1,809.8/km^{2})
Dongola	Village	Union	661	726	−9.0%	1.088	2.82	607.5/sq mi (234.6/km^{2})
Donnellson	Village	Montgomery; Bond	153	210	−27.1%	0.370	0.96	413.5/sq mi (159.7/km^{2})
Donovan	Village	Iroquois	251	304	−17.4%	0.328	0.85	765.2/sq mi (295.5/km^{2})
Dorchester	Village	Macoupin	133	151	−11.9%	0.722	1.87	184.2/sq mi (71.1/km^{2})
Dover	Village	Bureau	135	168	−19.6%	0.280	0.73	482.1/sq mi (186.2/km^{2})
Dowell	Village	Jackson	368	408	−9.8%	0.390	1.01	943.6/sq mi (364.3/km^{2})
Downers Grove	Village	DuPage	50,247	47,833	+5.0%	14.643	37.93	3,431.5/sq mi (1,324.9/km^{2})
Downs	Village	McLean	1,201	1,005	+19.5%	2.966	7.68	404.9/sq mi (156.3/km^{2})
Du Bois	Village	Washington	175	205	−14.6%	1.052	2.72	166.3/sq mi (64.2/km^{2})
Dunfermline	Village	Fulton	262	300	−12.7%	0.147	0.38	1,782.3/sq mi (688.2/km^{2})
Dunlap	Village	Peoria	1,603	1,386	+15.7%	2.308	5.98	694.5/sq mi (268.2/km^{2})
Dupo	Village	St. Clair	3,996	4,138	−3.4%	6.377	16.52	626.6/sq mi (241.9/km^{2})
Du Quoin	City	Perry	5,827	6,109	−4.6%	6.979	18.08	834.9/sq mi (322.4/km^{2})
Durand	Village	Winnebago	1,390	1,443	−3.7%	0.919	2.38	1,512.5/sq mi (584.0/km^{2})
Dwight	Village	Livingston; Grundy	4,032	4,260	−5.4%	3.297	8.54	1,222.9/sq mi (472.2/km^{2})
Eagarville	Village	Macoupin	114	127	−10.2%	0.911	2.36	125.1/sq mi (48.3/km^{2})
Earlville	City	LaSalle	1,613	1,701	−5.2%	1.201	3.11	1,343.0/sq mi (518.6/km^{2})
East Alton	Village	Madison	5,786	6,301	−8.2%	5.318	13.77	1,088.0/sq mi (420.1/km^{2})
East Brooklyn	Village	Grundy	80	106	−24.5%	0.052	0.13	1,538.5/sq mi (594.0/km^{2})
East Cape Girardeau	Village	Alexander	289	385	−24.9%	1.961	5.08	147.4/sq mi (56.9/km^{2})
East Carondelet	Village	St. Clair	390	499	−21.8%	1.177	3.05	331.4/sq mi (127.9/km^{2})
East Dubuque	City	Jo Daviess	1,505	1,704	−11.7%	2.742	7.10	548.9/sq mi (211.9/km^{2})
East Dundee	Village	Kane; Cook	3,152	2,860	+10.2%	2.839	7.35	1,110.3/sq mi (428.7/km^{2})
East Galesburg	Village	Knox	763	812	−6.0%	1.365	3.54	559.0/sq mi (215.8/km^{2})
East Gillespie	Village	Macoupin	269	270	−0.4%	0.319	0.83	843.3/sq mi (325.6/km^{2})
East Hazel Crest	Village	Cook	1,297	1,543	−15.9%	0.784	2.03	1,654.3/sq mi (638.7/km^{2})
East Moline	City	Rock Island	21,374	21,302	+0.3%	14.596	37.80	1,464.4/sq mi (565.4/km^{2})
Easton	Village	Mason	312	321	−2.8%	0.240	0.62	1,300.0/sq mi (501.9/km^{2})
East Peoria	City	Tazewell	22,484	23,402	−3.9%	20.411	52.86	1,101.6/sq mi (425.3/km^{2})
East St. Louis	City	St. Clair	18,469	27,006	−31.6%	13.919	36.05	1,326.9/sq mi (512.3/km^{2})
Eddyville	Village	Pope	99	101	−2.0%	0.281	0.73	352.3/sq mi (136.0/km^{2})
Edgewood	Village	Effingham	398	440	−9.5%	1.013	2.62	392.9/sq mi (151.7/km^{2})
Edinburg	Village	Christian	1,085	1,078	+0.6%	0.625	1.62	1,736.0/sq mi (670.3/km^{2})
Edwardsville†	City	Madison	26,808	24,293	+10.4%	19.811	51.31	1,353.2/sq mi (522.5/km^{2})
Effingham†	City	Effingham	12,252	12,328	−0.6%	10.309	26.70	1,188.5/sq mi (458.9/km^{2})
Elburn	Village	Kane	6,175	5,602	+10.2%	3.608	9.34	1,711.5/sq mi (660.8/km^{2})
El Dara	Village	Pike	63	78	−19.2%	1.011	2.62	62.3/sq mi (24.1/km^{2})
Eldorado	City	Saline	3,743	4,122	−9.2%	2.503	6.48	1,495.4/sq mi (577.4/km^{2})
Eldred	Village	Greene	149	201	−25.9%	0.134	0.35	1,111.9/sq mi (429.3/km^{2})
Elgin	City	Kane; Cook	114,797	108,188	+6.1%	38.027	98.49	3,018.8/sq mi (1,165.6/km^{2})
Elizabeth	Village	Jo Daviess	694	761	−8.8%	0.900	2.33	771.1/sq mi (297.7/km^{2})
Elizabethtown†	Village	Hardin	220	299	−26.4%	0.705	1.83	312.1/sq mi (120.5/km^{2})
Elk Grove Village	Village	Cook	32,812	33,127	−1.0%	11.639	30.14	2,819.1/sq mi (1,088.5/km^{2})
Elkhart	Village	Logan	450	405	+11.1%	1.942	5.03	231.7/sq mi (89.5/km^{2})
Elkville	Village	Jackson	838	928	−9.7%	0.767	1.99	1,092.6/sq mi (421.8/km^{2})
Elliott	Village	Ford	274	295	−7.1%	0.498	1.29	550.2/sq mi (212.4/km^{2})
Ellis Grove	Village	Randolph	328	363	−9.6%	0.491	1.27	668.0/sq mi (257.9/km^{2})
Ellisville	Village	Fulton	87	96	−9.4%	0.271	0.70	321.0/sq mi (124.0/km^{2})
Ellsworth	Village	McLean	184	195	−5.6%	0.217	0.56	847.9/sq mi (327.4/km^{2})
Elmhurst	City	DuPage	45,786	44,121	+3.8%	10.218	26.46	4,480.9/sq mi (1,730.1/km^{2})
Elmwood	City	Peoria	2,058	2,097	−1.9%	1.396	3.62	1,474.2/sq mi (569.2/km^{2})
Elmwood Park	Village	Cook	24,521	24,883	−1.5%	1.908	4.94	12,851.7/sq mi (4,962.1/km^{2})
El Paso	City	Woodford	2,756	2,810	−1.9%	2.145	5.56	1,284.8/sq mi (496.1/km^{2})
Elsah	Village	Jersey	519	673	−22.9%	1.092	2.83	475.3/sq mi (183.5/km^{2})
Elvaston	Village	Hancock	147	165	−10.9%	0.799	2.07	184.0/sq mi (71.0/km^{2})
Elwood	Village	Will	2,229	2,279	−2.2%	13.641	35.33	163.4/sq mi (63.1/km^{2})
Emden	Village	Logan	467	485	−3.7%	0.235	0.61	1,987.2/sq mi (767.3/km^{2})
Emington	Village	Livingston	101	117	−13.7%	0.083	0.21	1,216.9/sq mi (469.8/km^{2})
Energy	Village	Williamson	974	1,146	−15.0%	1.194	3.09	815.7/sq mi (315.0/km^{2})
Enfield	Village	White	794	596	+33.2%	1.011	2.62	785.4/sq mi (303.2/km^{2})
Equality	Village	Gallatin	539	595	−9.4%	0.877	2.27	614.6/sq mi (237.3/km^{2})
Erie	Village	Whiteside	1,518	1,602	−5.2%	1.380	3.57	1,100.0/sq mi (424.7/km^{2})
Essex	Village	Kankakee	841	802	+4.9%	2.327	6.03	361.4/sq mi (139.5/km^{2})
Eureka†	City	Woodford	5,227	5,295	−1.3%	2.684	6.95	1,947.5/sq mi (751.9/km^{2})
Evanston	City	Cook	78,110	74,486	+4.9%	7.779	20.15	10,041.1/sq mi (3,876.9/km^{2})
Evansville	Village	Randolph	547	701	−22.0%	0.788	2.04	694.2/sq mi (268.0/km^{2})
Evergreen Park	Village	Cook	19,943	19,852	+0.5%	3.163	8.19	6,305.1/sq mi (2,434.4/km^{2})
Ewing	Village	Franklin	300	307	−2.3%	1.009	2.61	297.3/sq mi (114.8/km^{2})
Exeter	Village	Scott	87	65	+33.8%	0.690	1.79	126.1/sq mi (48.7/km^{2})
Fairbury	City	Livingston	3,633	3,757	−3.3%	1.809	4.69	2,008.3/sq mi (775.4/km^{2})
Fairfield†	City	Wayne	4,883	5,154	−5.3%	4.028	10.43	1,212.3/sq mi (468.1/km^{2})
Fairmont City	Village	St. Clair; Madison	2,265	2,635	−14.0%	6.205	16.07	365.0/sq mi (140.9/km^{2})
Fairmount	Village	Vermilion	612	642	−4.7%	0.317	0.82	1,930.6/sq mi (745.4/km^{2})
Fairview	Village	Fulton	426	522	−18.4%	4.215	10.92	101.1/sq mi (39.0/km^{2})
Fairview Heights	City	St. Clair	16,706	17,078	−2.2%	11.431	29.61	1,461.5/sq mi (564.3/km^{2})
Farina	Village	Fayette	540	518	+4.2%	1.457	3.77	370.6/sq mi (143.1/km^{2})
Farmer City	City	De Witt	1,828	2,037	−10.3%	2.395	6.20	763.3/sq mi (294.7/km^{2})
Farmersville	Village	Montgomery	689	724	−4.8%	0.703	1.82	980.1/sq mi (378.4/km^{2})
Farmington	City	Fulton	2,389	2,448	−2.4%	1.505	3.90	1,587.4/sq mi (612.9/km^{2})
Fayetteville	Village	St. Clair	302	366	−17.5%	0.296	0.77	1,020.3/sq mi (393.9/km^{2})
Ferris	Village	Hancock	127	156	−18.6%	1.967	5.09	64.6/sq mi (24.9/km^{2})
Fidelity	Village	Jersey	96	114	−15.8%	0.101	0.26	950.5/sq mi (367.0/km^{2})
Fieldon	Village	Jersey	176	239	−26.4%	0.202	0.52	871.3/sq mi (336.4/km^{2})
Fillmore	Village	Montgomery	305	330	−7.6%	1.016	2.63	300.2/sq mi (115.9/km^{2})
Findlay	Village	Shelby	664	683	−2.8%	0.924	2.39	718.6/sq mi (277.5/km^{2})
Fisher	Village	Champaign	2,062	1,881	+9.6%	1.330	3.44	1,550.4/sq mi (598.6/km^{2})
Fithian	Village	Vermilion	488	485	+0.6%	0.383	0.99	1,274.2/sq mi (492.0/km^{2})
Flanagan	Village	Livingston	1,010	1,110	−9.0%	0.574	1.49	1,759.6/sq mi (679.4/km^{2})
Flat Rock	Village	Crawford	323	331	−2.4%	0.856	2.22	377.3/sq mi (145.7/km^{2})
Flora	City	Clay	4,803	5,070	−5.3%	4.690	12.15	1,024.1/sq mi (395.4/km^{2})
Florence	Village	Pike	17	38	−55.3%	0.276	0.71	61.6/sq mi (23.8/km^{2})
Flossmoor	Village	Cook	9,704	9,464	+2.5%	3.661	9.48	2,650.6/sq mi (1,023.4/km^{2})
Foosland	Village	Champaign	75	101	−25.7%	0.069	0.18	1,087.0/sq mi (419.7/km^{2})
Ford Heights	Village	Cook	1,813	2,763	−34.4%	1.946	5.04	931.7/sq mi (359.7/km^{2})
Forest City	Village	Mason	222	246	−9.8%	0.523	1.35	424.5/sq mi (163.9/km^{2})
Forest Park	Village	Cook	14,339	14,167	+1.2%	2.402	6.22	5,969.6/sq mi (2,304.9/km^{2})
Forest View	Village	Cook	792	698	+13.5%	1.168	3.03	678.1/sq mi (261.8/km^{2})
Forrest	Village	Livingston	1,041	1,220	−14.7%	0.648	1.68	1,606.5/sq mi (620.3/km^{2})
Forreston	Village	Ogle	1,435	1,446	−0.8%	0.943	2.44	1,521.7/sq mi (587.5/km^{2})
Forsyth	Village	Macon	3,734	3,490	+7.0%	3.130	8.11	1,193.0/sq mi (460.6/km^{2})
Fox Lake	Village	Lake; McHenry	10,978	10,579	+3.8%	7.833	20.29	1,401.5/sq mi (541.1/km^{2})
Fox River Grove	Village	McHenry; Lake	4,702	4,854	−3.1%	1.711	4.43	2,748.1/sq mi (1,061.0/km^{2})
Frankfort	Village	Will	20,296	17,782	+14.1%	15.788	40.89	1,285.5/sq mi (496.3/km^{2})
Franklin	Village	Morgan	610	610	0.0%	0.829	2.15	735.8/sq mi (284.1/km^{2})
Franklin Grove	Village	Lee	896	1,021	−12.2%	0.467	1.21	1,918.6/sq mi (740.8/km^{2})
Franklin Park	Village	Cook	18,467	18,333	+0.7%	4.772	12.36	3,869.9/sq mi (1,494.2/km^{2})
Freeburg	Village	St. Clair	4,582	4,354	+5.2%	6.836	17.71	670.3/sq mi (258.8/km^{2})
Freeman Spur	Village	Williamson; Franklin	268	287	−6.6%	0.399	1.03	671.7/sq mi (259.3/km^{2})
Freeport†	City	Stephenson	23,973	25,638	−6.5%	11.881	30.77	2,017.8/sq mi (779.1/km^{2})
Fulton	City	Whiteside	3,647	3,481	+4.8%	2.338	6.06	1,559.9/sq mi (602.3/km^{2})
Fults	Village	Monroe	28	26	+7.7%	0.053	0.14	528.3/sq mi (204.0/km^{2})
Galatia	Village	Saline	827	933	−11.4%	1.952	5.06	423.7/sq mi (163.6/km^{2})
Galena†	City	Jo Daviess	3,308	3,429	−3.5%	4.492	11.63	736.4/sq mi (284.3/km^{2})
Galesburg†	City	Knox	30,052	32,195	−6.7%	17.743	45.95	1,693.7/sq mi (654.0/km^{2})
Galva	City	Henry	2,470	2,589	−4.6%	2.755	7.14	896.6/sq mi (346.2/km^{2})
Gardner	Village	Grundy	1,366	1,463	−6.6%	2.912	7.54	469.1/sq mi (181.1/km^{2})
Garrett	Village	Douglas	122	162	−24.7%	0.108	0.28	1,129.6/sq mi (436.2/km^{2})
Gays	Village	Moultrie	218	281	−22.4%	0.386	1.00	564.8/sq mi (218.1/km^{2})
Geneseo	City	Henry	6,539	6,586	−0.7%	4.646	12.03	1,407.4/sq mi (543.4/km^{2})
Geneva†	City	Kane	21,393	21,495	−0.5%	9.919	25.69	2,156.8/sq mi (832.7/km^{2})
Genoa	City	DeKalb	5,298	5,193	+2.0%	2.590	6.71	2,045.6/sq mi (789.8/km^{2})
Georgetown	City	Vermilion	3,143	3,474	−9.5%	1.616	4.19	1,944.9/sq mi (750.9/km^{2})
Germantown	Village	Clinton	1,324	1,269	+4.3%	1.014	2.63	1,305.7/sq mi (504.1/km^{2})
Germantown Hills	Village	Woodford	3,412	3,438	−0.8%	1.636	4.24	2,085.6/sq mi (805.2/km^{2})
German Valley	Village	Stephenson	433	463	−6.5%	0.478	1.24	905.9/sq mi (349.8/km^{2})
Gibson City	City	Ford	3,475	3,407	+2.0%	2.321	6.01	1,497.2/sq mi (578.1/km^{2})
Gifford	Village	Champaign	911	975	−6.6%	0.444	1.15	2,051.8/sq mi (792.2/km^{2})
Gilberts	Village	Kane	8,366	6,879	+21.6%	5.489	14.22	1,524.1/sq mi (588.5/km^{2})
Gillespie	City	Macoupin	3,168	3,319	−4.5%	1.484	3.84	2,134.8/sq mi (824.2/km^{2})
Gilman	City	Iroquois	1,738	1,814	−4.2%	2.433	6.30	714.3/sq mi (275.8/km^{2})
Girard	City	Macoupin	1,785	2,103	−15.1%	0.934	2.42	1,911.1/sq mi (737.9/km^{2})
Gladstone	Village	Henderson	234	281	−16.7%	0.360	0.93	650.0/sq mi (251.0/km^{2})
Glasford	Village	Peoria	866	1,022	−15.3%	0.908	2.35	953.7/sq mi (368.2/km^{2})
Glasgow	Village	Scott	113	141	−19.9%	1.011	2.62	111.8/sq mi (43.2/km^{2})
Glen Carbon	Village	Madison	13,842	12,934	+7.0%	10.250	26.55	1,350.4/sq mi (521.4/km^{2})
Glencoe	Village	Cook	8,849	8,723	+1.4%	3.718	9.63	2,380.0/sq mi (918.9/km^{2})
Glendale Heights	Village	DuPage	33,176	34,208	−3.0%	5.385	13.95	6,160.8/sq mi (2,378.7/km^{2})
Glen Ellyn	Village	DuPage	28,846	27,450	+5.1%	6.850	17.74	4,211.1/sq mi (1,625.9/km^{2})
Glenview	Village	Cook	48,705	44,692	+9.0%	14.001	36.26	3,478.7/sq mi (1,343.1/km^{2})
Glenwood	Village	Cook	8,662	8,969	−3.4%	3.264	8.45	2,653.8/sq mi (1,024.6/km^{2})
Godfrey	Village	Madison	17,825	17,982	−0.9%	34.395	89.08	518.2/sq mi (200.1/km^{2})
Godley	Village	Will; Grundy	566	601	−5.8%	1.083	2.80	522.6/sq mi (201.8/km^{2})
Golconda†	City	Pope	630	668	−5.7%	0.510	1.32	1,235.3/sq mi (476.9/km^{2})
Golden	Village	Adams	648	644	+0.6%	0.642	1.66	1,009.3/sq mi (389.7/km^{2})
Golden Gate	Village	Wayne	65	68	−4.4%	0.079	0.20	822.8/sq mi (317.7/km^{2})
Golf	Village	Cook	514	500	+2.8%	0.448	1.16	1,147.3/sq mi (443.0/km^{2})
Goodfield	Village	Woodford; Tazewell	936	860	+8.8%	1.622	4.20	577.1/sq mi (222.8/km^{2})
Good Hope	Village	McDonough	363	396	−8.3%	0.300	0.78	1,210.0/sq mi (467.2/km^{2})
Goreville	Village	Johnson	1,068	1,049	+1.8%	2.686	6.96	397.6/sq mi (153.5/km^{2})
Gorham	Village	Jackson	173	236	−26.7%	1.219	3.16	141.9/sq mi (54.8/km^{2})
Grafton	City	Jersey	626	674	−7.1%	3.712	9.61	168.6/sq mi (65.1/km^{2})
Grand Ridge	Village	LaSalle	515	560	−8.0%	0.462	1.20	1,114.7/sq mi (430.4/km^{2})
Grand Tower	City	Jackson	479	605	−20.8%	1.248	3.23	383.8/sq mi (148.2/km^{2})
Grandview	Village	Sangamon	1,405	1,441	−2.5%	0.335	0.87	4,194.0/sq mi (1,619.3/km^{2})
Granite City	City	Madison	27,549	29,849	−7.7%	19.024	49.27	1,448.1/sq mi (559.1/km^{2})
Grantfork	Village	Madison	341	337	+1.2%	0.337	0.87	1,011.9/sq mi (390.7/km^{2})
Grant Park	Village	Kankakee	1,294	1,331	−2.8%	3.413	8.84	379.1/sq mi (146.4/km^{2})
Granville	Village	Putnam	1,359	1,427	−4.8%	1.307	3.39	1,039.8/sq mi (401.5/km^{2})
Grayslake	Village	Lake	21,248	20,957	+1.4%	10.900	28.23	1,949.4/sq mi (752.7/km^{2})
Grayville	City	Edwards; White	1,550	1,666	−7.0%	2.127	5.51	728.7/sq mi (281.4/km^{2})
Greenfield	City	Greene	1,059	1,071	−1.1%	1.714	4.44	617.9/sq mi (238.6/km^{2})
Green Oaks	Village	Lake	4,128	3,866	+6.8%	3.985	10.32	1,035.9/sq mi (400.0/km^{2})
Greenup	Village	Cumberland	1,365	1,513	−9.8%	1.750	4.53	780.0/sq mi (301.2/km^{2})
Green Valley	Village	Tazewell	630	709	−11.1%	0.301	0.78	2,093.0/sq mi (808.1/km^{2})
Greenview	Village	Menard	745	778	−4.2%	0.859	2.22	867.3/sq mi (334.9/km^{2})
Greenville†	City	Bond	7,083	7,000	+1.2%	6.309	16.34	1,122.7/sq mi (433.5/km^{2})
Greenwood	Village	McHenry	324	255	+27.1%	2.632	6.82	123.1/sq mi (47.5/km^{2})
Gridley	Village	McLean	1,456	1,432	+1.7%	1.233	3.19	1,180.9/sq mi (455.9/km^{2})
Griggsville	City	Pike	1,097	1,226	−10.5%	1.106	2.86	991.9/sq mi (383.0/km^{2})
Gulfport	Village	Henderson	42	54	−22.2%	1.412	3.66	29.7/sq mi (11.5/km^{2})
Gurnee	Village	Lake	30,706	31,295	−1.9%	13.503	34.97	2,274.0/sq mi (878.0/km^{2})
Hainesville	Village	Lake	3,546	3,597	−1.4%	1.847	4.78	1,919.9/sq mi (741.3/km^{2})
Hamburg	Village	Calhoun	99	128	−22.7%	0.522	1.35	189.7/sq mi (73.2/km^{2})
Hamel	Village	Madison	929	816	+13.8%	1.190	3.08	780.7/sq mi (301.4/km^{2})
Hamilton	City	Hancock	2,753	2,951	−6.7%	3.561	9.22	773.1/sq mi (298.5/km^{2})
Hammond	Village	Piatt	508	509	−0.2%	0.757	1.96	671.1/sq mi (259.1/km^{2})
Hampshire	Village	Kane	7,667	5,563	+37.8%	9.505	24.62	806.6/sq mi (311.4/km^{2})
Hampton	Village	Rock Island	1,779	1,863	−4.5%	1.461	3.78	1,217.7/sq mi (470.1/km^{2})
Hanaford	Village	Franklin	320	327	−2.1%	1.008	2.61	317.5/sq mi (122.6/km^{2})
Hanna City	Village	Peoria	1,253	1,225	+2.3%	1.278	3.31	980.4/sq mi (378.5/km^{2})
Hanover	Village	Jo Daviess	863	844	+2.3%	1.122	2.91	769.2/sq mi (297.0/km^{2})
Hanover Park	Village	DuPage	37,470	37,973	−1.3%	6.422	16.63	5,834.6/sq mi (2,252.8/km^{2})
Hardin†	Village	Calhoun	801	967	−17.2%	2.128	5.51	376.4/sq mi (145.3/km^{2})
Harmon	Village	Lee	111	120	−7.5%	0.149	0.39	745.0/sq mi (287.6/km^{2})
Harrisburg†	City	Saline	8,219	9,017	−8.8%	6.612	17.13	1,243.0/sq mi (479.9/km^{2})
Harristown	Village	Macon	1,310	1,367	−4.2%	1.797	4.65	729.0/sq mi (281.5/km^{2})
Hartford	Village	Madison	1,185	1,429	−17.1%	5.166	13.38	229.4/sq mi (88.6/km^{2})
Hartsburg	Village	Logan	262	314	−16.6%	0.150	0.39	1,746.7/sq mi (674.4/km^{2})
Harvard	City	McHenry	9,469	9,447	+0.2%	8.355	21.64	1,133.3/sq mi (437.6/km^{2})
Harvel	Village	Montgomery; Christian	178	223	−20.2%	0.718	1.86	247.9/sq mi (95.7/km^{2})
Harvey	City	Cook	20,324	25,282	−19.6%	6.206	16.07	3,274.9/sq mi (1,264.4/km^{2})
Harwood Heights	Village	Cook	9,065	8,612	+5.3%	0.825	2.14	10,987.9/sq mi (4,242.4/km^{2})
Havana†	City	Mason	2,963	3,301	−10.2%	2.776	7.19	1,067.4/sq mi (412.1/km^{2})
Hawthorn Woods	Village	Lake	9,062	7,663	+18.3%	8.046	20.84	1,126.3/sq mi (434.9/km^{2})
Hazel Crest	Village	Cook	13,382	14,100	−5.1%	3.397	8.80	3,939.4/sq mi (1,521.0/km^{2})
Hebron	Village	McHenry	1,368	1,216	+12.5%	1.931	5.00	708.4/sq mi (273.5/km^{2})
Hecker	Village	Monroe	429	481	−10.8%	0.253	0.66	1,695.7/sq mi (654.7/km^{2})
Henderson	Village	Knox	266	255	+4.3%	0.265	0.69	1,003.8/sq mi (387.6/km^{2})
Hennepin†	Village	Putnam	769	757	+1.6%	5.307	13.75	144.9/sq mi (55.9/km^{2})
Henning	Village	Vermilion	210	251	−16.3%	1.524	3.95	137.8/sq mi (53.2/km^{2})
Henry	City	Marshall	2,320	2,464	−5.8%	1.797	4.65	1,291.0/sq mi (498.5/km^{2})
Herrick	Village	Shelby	358	436	−17.9%	0.366	0.95	978.1/sq mi (377.7/km^{2})
Herrin	City	Williamson	12,352	12,501	−1.2%	9.673	25.05	1,277.0/sq mi (493.0/km^{2})
Herscher	Village	Kankakee	1,521	1,591	−4.4%	1.813	4.70	838.9/sq mi (323.9/km^{2})
Hettick	Village	Macoupin	149	181	−17.7%	0.365	0.95	408.2/sq mi (157.6/km^{2})
Heyworth	Village	McLean	2,791	2,841	−1.8%	3.026	7.84	922.3/sq mi (356.1/km^{2})
Hickory Hills	City	Cook	14,505	14,049	+3.2%	2.844	7.37	5,100.2/sq mi (1,969.2/km^{2})
Hidalgo	Village	Jasper	111	106	+4.7%	0.344	0.89	322.7/sq mi (124.6/km^{2})
Highland	City	Madison	9,991	9,919	+0.7%	6.751	17.49	1,479.9/sq mi (571.4/km^{2})
Highland Park	City	Lake	30,176	29,763	+1.4%	12.241	31.70	2,465.2/sq mi (951.8/km^{2})
Highwood	City	Lake	5,074	5,405	−6.1%	0.721	1.87	7,037.4/sq mi (2,717.2/km^{2})
Hillcrest	Village	Ogle	1,224	1,326	−7.7%	3.549	9.19	344.9/sq mi (133.2/km^{2})
Hillsboro†	City	Montgomery	5,902	6,207	−4.9%	8.262	21.40	714.4/sq mi (275.8/km^{2})
Hillsdale	Village	Rock Island	417	523	−20.3%	0.648	1.68	643.5/sq mi (248.5/km^{2})
Hillside	Village	Cook	8,320	8,157	+2.0%	3.168	8.21	2,626.3/sq mi (1,014.0/km^{2})
Hillview	Village	Greene	94	193	−51.3%	0.816	2.11	115.2/sq mi (44.5/km^{2})
Hinckley	Village	DeKalb	2,006	2,070	−3.1%	0.847	2.19	2,368.4/sq mi (914.4/km^{2})
Hindsboro	Village	Douglas	275	313	−12.1%	0.269	0.70	1,022.3/sq mi (394.7/km^{2})
Hinsdale	Village	DuPage; Cook	17,395	16,816	+3.4%	4.623	11.97	3,762.7/sq mi (1,452.8/km^{2})
Hodgkins	Village	Cook	1,500	1,897	−20.9%	2.712	7.02	553.1/sq mi (213.6/km^{2})
Hoffman	Village	Clinton	439	508	−13.6%	0.506	1.31	867.6/sq mi (335.0/km^{2})
Hoffman Estates	Village	Cook	52,530	51,895	+1.2%	21.065	54.56	2,493.7/sq mi (962.8/km^{2})
Holiday Hills	Village	McHenry	618	610	+1.3%	0.934	2.42	661.7/sq mi (255.5/km^{2})
Hollowayville	Village	Bureau	36	84	−57.1%	0.049	0.13	734.7/sq mi (283.7/km^{2})
Homer	Village	Champaign	1,073	1,193	−10.1%	0.980	2.54	1,094.9/sq mi (422.7/km^{2})
Homer Glen	Village	Will	24,543	24,220	+1.3%	22.125	57.30	1,109.3/sq mi (428.3/km^{2})
Hometown	City	Cook	4,343	4,349	−0.1%	0.479	1.24	9,066.8/sq mi (3,500.7/km^{2})
Homewood	Village	Cook	19,463	19,323	+0.7%	5.216	13.51	3,731.4/sq mi (1,440.7/km^{2})
Hoopeston	City	Vermilion	4,915	5,351	−8.1%	3.686	9.55	1,333.4/sq mi (514.8/km^{2})
Hooppole	Village	Henry	180	204	−11.8%	0.372	0.96	483.9/sq mi (186.8/km^{2})
Hopedale	Village	Tazewell	830	865	−4.0%	0.882	2.28	941.0/sq mi (363.3/km^{2})
Hopewell	Village	Marshall	421	410	+2.7%	1.135	2.94	370.9/sq mi (143.2/km^{2})
Hopkins Park	Village	Kankakee	597	603	−1.0%	4.137	10.71	144.3/sq mi (55.7/km^{2})
Hoyleton	Village	Washington	520	531	−2.1%	0.760	1.97	684.2/sq mi (264.2/km^{2})
Hudson	Village	McLean	1,753	1,838	−4.6%	0.818	2.12	2,143.0/sq mi (827.4/km^{2})
Huey	Village	Clinton	160	169	−5.3%	0.216	0.56	740.7/sq mi (286.0/km^{2})
Hull	Village	Pike	392	461	−15.0%	1.825	4.73	214.8/sq mi (82.9/km^{2})
Humboldt	Village	Coles	361	437	−17.4%	0.343	0.89	1,052.5/sq mi (406.4/km^{2})
Hume	Village	Edgar	325	380	−14.5%	0.566	1.47	574.2/sq mi (221.7/km^{2})
Huntley	Village	McHenry; Kane	27,740	24,291	+14.2%	14.289	37.01	1,941.4/sq mi (749.6/km^{2})
Hurst	City	Williamson	764	795	−3.9%	0.887	2.30	861.3/sq mi (332.6/km^{2})
Hutsonville	Village	Crawford	478	554	−13.7%	0.622	1.61	768.5/sq mi (296.7/km^{2})
Illiopolis	Village	Sangamon	846	891	−5.1%	0.677	1.75	1,249.6/sq mi (482.5/km^{2})
Ina	Village	Jefferson	1,641	2,338	−29.8%	2.405	6.23	682.3/sq mi (263.4/km^{2})
Indian Creek	Village	Lake	536	462	+16.0%	0.267	0.69	2,007.5/sq mi (775.1/km^{2})
Indian Head Park	Village	Cook	4,065	3,809	+6.7%	0.930	2.41	4,371.0/sq mi (1,687.6/km^{2})
Indianola	Village	Vermilion	227	276	−17.8%	0.388	1.00	585.1/sq mi (225.9/km^{2})
Industry	Village	McDonough	399	478	−16.5%	0.460	1.19	867.4/sq mi (334.9/km^{2})
Inverness	Village	Cook	7,616	7,399	+2.9%	6.534	16.92	1,165.6/sq mi (450.0/km^{2})
Iola	Village	Clay	98	141	−30.5%	0.964	2.50	101.7/sq mi (39.3/km^{2})
Ipava	Village	Fulton	447	470	−4.9%	0.268	0.69	1,667.9/sq mi (644.0/km^{2})
Iroquois	Village	Iroquois	133	154	−13.6%	0.567	1.47	234.6/sq mi (90.6/km^{2})
Irving	Village	Montgomery	373	495	−24.6%	0.897	2.32	415.8/sq mi (160.6/km^{2})
Irvington	Village	Washington	581	659	−11.8%	1.010	2.62	575.2/sq mi (222.1/km^{2})
Irwin	Village	Kankakee	68	74	−8.1%	0.045	0.12	1,511.1/sq mi (583.4/km^{2})
Island Lake	Village	Lake; McHenry	8,051	8,080	−0.4%	3.348	8.67	2,404.7/sq mi (928.5/km^{2})
Itasca	Village	DuPage	9,543	8,649	+10.3%	5.022	13.01	1,900.2/sq mi (733.7/km^{2})
Iuka	Village	Marion	512	489	+4.7%	0.733	1.90	698.5/sq mi (269.7/km^{2})
Ivesdale	Village	Champaign	265	267	−0.7%	0.716	1.85	370.1/sq mi (142.9/km^{2})
Jacksonville†	City	Morgan	17,616	19,446	−9.4%	10.563	27.36	1,667.7/sq mi (643.9/km^{2})
Jeffersonville	Village	Wayne	355	367	−3.3%	1.012	2.62	350.8/sq mi (135.4/km^{2})
Jeisyville	Village	Christian	102	107	−4.7%	0.122	0.32	836.1/sq mi (322.8/km^{2})
Jerome	Village	Sangamon	1,692	1,656	+2.2%	0.462	1.20	3,662.3/sq mi (1,414.0/km^{2})
Jerseyville†	City	Jersey	8,337	8,465	−1.5%	5.237	13.56	1,591.9/sq mi (614.7/km^{2})
Jewett	Village	Cumberland	196	223	−12.1%	1.005	2.60	195.0/sq mi (75.3/km^{2})
Johnsburg	Village	McHenry	6,355	6,337	+0.3%	7.163	18.55	887.2/sq mi (342.5/km^{2})
Johnsonville	Village	Wayne	72	77	−6.5%	0.213	0.55	338.0/sq mi (130.5/km^{2})
Johnston City	City	Williamson	3,384	3,543	−4.5%	2.116	5.48	1,599.2/sq mi (617.5/km^{2})
Joliet†	City	Will; Kendall	150,362	147,433	+2.0%	64.516	167.10	2,330.6/sq mi (899.9/km^{2})
Jonesboro†	City	Union	1,711	1,821	−6.0%	2.700	6.99	633.7/sq mi (244.7/km^{2})
Joppa	Village	Massac	350	360	−2.8%	0.486	1.26	720.2/sq mi (278.1/km^{2})
Joy	Village	Mercer	372	417	−10.8%	0.428	1.11	869.2/sq mi (335.6/km^{2})
Junction	Village	Gallatin	56	129	−56.6%	0.826	2.14	67.8/sq mi (26.2/km^{2})
Junction City	Village	Marion	527	482	+9.3%	0.684	1.77	770.5/sq mi (297.5/km^{2})
Justice	Village	Cook	12,600	12,926	−2.5%	2.840	7.36	4,436.6/sq mi (1,713.0/km^{2})
Kampsville	Village	Calhoun	310	328	−5.5%	1.020	2.64	303.9/sq mi (117.3/km^{2})
Kane	Village	Greene	296	438	−32.4%	0.544	1.41	544.1/sq mi (210.1/km^{2})
Kaneville	Village	Kane	452	484	−6.6%	0.285	0.74	1,586.0/sq mi (612.3/km^{2})
Kangley	Village	LaSalle	235	251	−6.4%	0.261	0.68	900.4/sq mi (347.6/km^{2})
Kankakee†	City	Kankakee	24,052	27,537	−12.7%	15.057	39.00	1,597.4/sq mi (616.8/km^{2})
Kansas	Village	Edgar	670	787	−14.9%	1.022	2.65	655.6/sq mi (253.1/km^{2})
Kappa	Village	Woodford	229	227	+0.9%	0.357	0.92	641.5/sq mi (247.7/km^{2})
Karnak	Village	Pulaski	430	499	−13.8%	1.806	4.68	238.1/sq mi (91.9/km^{2})
Kaskaskia	Village	Randolph	21	14	+50.0%	0.106	0.27	198.1/sq mi (76.5/km^{2})
Keenes	Village	Wayne	50	83	−39.8%	0.130	0.34	384.6/sq mi (148.5/km^{2})
Keensburg	Village	Wabash	174	210	−17.1%	0.260	0.67	669.2/sq mi (258.4/km^{2})
Keithsburg	City	Mercer	550	609	−9.7%	2.558	6.63	215.0/sq mi (83.0/km^{2})
Kell	Village	Marion	173	219	−21.0%	1.002	2.60	172.7/sq mi (66.7/km^{2})
Kempton	Village	Ford	176	231	−23.8%	0.165	0.43	1,066.7/sq mi (411.8/km^{2})
Kenilworth	Village	Cook	2,514	2,513	0.0%	0.607	1.57	4,141.7/sq mi (1,599.1/km^{2})
Kenney	Village	De Witt	311	326	−4.6%	0.282	0.73	1,102.8/sq mi (425.8/km^{2})
Kewanee	City	Henry	12,509	12,916	−3.2%	6.597	17.09	1,896.2/sq mi (732.1/km^{2})
Keyesport	Village	Clinton; Bond	406	421	−3.6%	0.720	1.86	563.9/sq mi (217.7/km^{2})
Kilbourne	Village	Mason	265	302	−12.3%	0.889	2.30	298.1/sq mi (115.1/km^{2})
Kildeer	Village	Lake	4,091	3,968	+3.1%	4.230	10.96	967.1/sq mi (373.4/km^{2})
Kincaid	Village	Christian	1,349	1,505	−10.4%	0.817	2.12	1,651.2/sq mi (637.5/km^{2})
Kinderhook	Village	Pike	189	216	−12.5%	0.808	2.09	233.9/sq mi (90.3/km^{2})
Kingston	Village	DeKalb	1,108	1,164	−4.8%	0.984	2.55	1,126.0/sq mi (434.8/km^{2})
Kingston Mines	Village	Peoria	266	302	−11.9%	1.444	3.74	184.2/sq mi (71.1/km^{2})
Kinmundy	City	Marion	733	796	−7.9%	1.198	3.10	611.9/sq mi (236.2/km^{2})
Kinsman	Village	Grundy	90	99	−9.1%	0.068	0.18	1,323.5/sq mi (511.0/km^{2})
Kirkland	Village	DeKalb	1,650	1,744	−5.4%	1.226	3.18	1,345.8/sq mi (519.6/km^{2})
Kirkwood	Village	Warren	678	714	−5.0%	0.939	2.43	722.0/sq mi (278.8/km^{2})
Knoxville	City	Knox	2,901	2,911	−0.3%	2.350	6.09	1,234.5/sq mi (476.6/km^{2})
Lacon†	City	Marshall	1,878	1,937	−3.0%	1.600	4.14	1,173.8/sq mi (453.2/km^{2})
Ladd	Village	Bureau	1,263	1,295	−2.5%	1.209	3.13	1,044.7/sq mi (403.3/km^{2})
La Fayette	Village	Stark	160	223	−28.3%	0.189	0.49	846.6/sq mi (326.9/km^{2})
La Grange	Village	Cook	16,321	15,550	+5.0%	2.525	6.54	6,463.8/sq mi (2,495.7/km^{2})
La Grange Park	Village	Cook	13,475	13,579	−0.8%	2.233	5.78	6,034.5/sq mi (2,329.9/km^{2})
La Harpe	City	Hancock	1,175	1,235	−4.9%	1.364	3.53	861.4/sq mi (332.6/km^{2})
Lake Barrington	Village	Lake	5,100	4,973	+2.6%	5.736	14.86	889.1/sq mi (343.3/km^{2})
Lake Bluff	Village	Lake	5,616	5,722	−1.9%	4.075	10.55	1,378.2/sq mi (532.1/km^{2})
Lake Forest	City	Lake	19,367	19,375	0.0%	17.200	44.55	1,126.0/sq mi (434.7/km^{2})
Lake in the Hills	Village	McHenry	28,982	28,965	+0.1%	10.203	26.43	2,840.5/sq mi (1,096.7/km^{2})
Lake Ka-Ho	Village	Macoupin	194	237	−18.1%	0.284	0.74	683.1/sq mi (263.7/km^{2})
Lakemoor	Village	McHenry; Lake	6,182	6,017	+2.7%	5.263	13.63	1,174.6/sq mi (453.5/km^{2})
Lake Villa	Village	Lake	8,741	8,741	0.0%	6.515	16.87	1,341.7/sq mi (518.0/km^{2})
Lakewood	Village	McHenry	4,283	3,811	+12.4%	4.587	11.88	933.7/sq mi (360.5/km^{2})
Lake Zurich	Village	Lake	19,759	19,631	+0.7%	6.868	17.79	2,877.0/sq mi (1,110.8/km^{2})
La Moille	Village	Bureau	679	726	−6.5%	1.156	2.99	587.4/sq mi (226.8/km^{2})
Lanark	City	Carroll	1,504	1,457	+3.2%	1.121	2.90	1,341.7/sq mi (518.0/km^{2})
Lansing	Village	Cook	29,076	28,331	+2.6%	7.462	19.33	3,896.5/sq mi (1,504.5/km^{2})
La Prairie	Village	Adams	42	47	−10.6%	0.193	0.50	217.6/sq mi (84.0/km^{2})
La Rose	Village	Marshall	98	144	−31.9%	0.255	0.66	384.3/sq mi (148.4/km^{2})
LaSalle	City	LaSalle	9,582	9,609	−0.3%	13.457	34.85	712.0/sq mi (274.9/km^{2})
Latham	Village	Logan	333	380	−12.4%	0.273	0.71	1,219.8/sq mi (471.0/km^{2})
Lawrenceville†	City	Lawrence	4,164	4,348	−4.2%	2.164	5.60	1,924.2/sq mi (742.9/km^{2})
Leaf River	Village	Ogle	432	443	−2.5%	0.869	2.25	497.1/sq mi (191.9/km^{2})
Lebanon	City	St. Clair	4,691	4,418	+6.2%	2.695	6.98	1,740.6/sq mi (672.1/km^{2})
Lee	Village	Lee; DeKalb	313	337	−7.1%	0.198	0.51	1,580.8/sq mi (610.4/km^{2})
Leland	Village	LaSalle	951	977	−2.7%	0.534	1.38	1,780.9/sq mi (687.6/km^{2})
Leland Grove	City	Sangamon	1,454	1,503	−3.3%	0.628	1.63	2,315.3/sq mi (893.9/km^{2})
Lemont	Village	Cook; DuPage	17,629	16,000	+10.2%	8.321	21.55	2,118.6/sq mi (818.0/km^{2})
Lena	Village	Stephenson	2,772	2,912	−4.8%	2.651	6.87	1,045.6/sq mi (403.7/km^{2})
Lenzburg	Village	St. Clair	468	521	−10.2%	1.155	2.99	405.2/sq mi (156.4/km^{2})
Leonore	Village	LaSalle	121	130	−6.9%	0.089	0.23	1,359.6/sq mi (524.9/km^{2})
Lerna	Village	Coles	226	286	−21.0%	0.115	0.30	1,965.2/sq mi (758.8/km^{2})
Le Roy	City	McLean	3,512	3,560	−1.3%	2.404	6.23	1,460.9/sq mi (564.1/km^{2})
Lewistown†	City	Fulton	2,041	2,384	−14.4%	2.000	5.18	1,020.5/sq mi (394.0/km^{2})
Lexington	City	McLean	2,090	2,060	+1.5%	2.047	5.30	1,021.0/sq mi (394.2/km^{2})
Liberty	Village	Adams	543	516	+5.2%	0.391	1.01	1,388.7/sq mi (536.2/km^{2})
Libertyville	Village	Lake	20,579	20,315	+1.3%	8.808	22.81	2,336.4/sq mi (902.1/km^{2})
Lily Lake	Village	Kane	1,032	993	+3.9%	2.717	7.04	379.8/sq mi (146.7/km^{2})
Lima	Village	Adams	148	163	−9.2%	0.135	0.35	1,096.3/sq mi (423.3/km^{2})
Limestone	Village	Kankakee	1,558	1,598	−2.5%	2.622	6.79	594.2/sq mi (229.4/km^{2})
Lincoln†	City	Logan	13,288	14,504	−8.4%	6.247	16.18	2,127.1/sq mi (821.3/km^{2})
Lincolnshire	Village	Lake	7,940	7,275	+9.1%	4.559	11.81	1,741.6/sq mi (672.4/km^{2})
Lincolnwood	Village	Cook	13,463	12,590	+6.9%	2.692	6.97	5,001.1/sq mi (1,930.9/km^{2})
Lindenhurst	Village	Lake	14,406	14,462	−0.4%	4.527	11.72	3,182.2/sq mi (1,228.7/km^{2})
Lisbon	Village	Kendall	271	285	−4.9%	2.117	5.48	128.0/sq mi (49.4/km^{2})
Lisle	Village	DuPage	24,223	22,390	+8.2%	6.901	17.87	3,510.1/sq mi (1,355.2/km^{2})
Litchfield	City	Montgomery	6,605	6,939	−4.8%	8.989	23.28	734.8/sq mi (283.7/km^{2})
Littleton	Village	Schuyler	139	181	−23.2%	1.168	3.03	119.0/sq mi (45.9/km^{2})
Little York	Village	Warren	283	331	−14.5%	0.223	0.58	1,269.1/sq mi (490.0/km^{2})
Liverpool	Village	Fulton	94	129	−27.1%	0.084	0.22	1,119.0/sq mi (432.1/km^{2})
Livingston	Village	Madison	763	858	−11.1%	1.040	2.69	733.7/sq mi (283.3/km^{2})
Loami	Village	Sangamon	812	745	+9.0%	1.012	2.62	802.4/sq mi (309.8/km^{2})
Lockport	City	Will	26,094	24,839	+5.1%	11.530	29.86	2,263.1/sq mi (873.8/km^{2})
Loda	Village	Iroquois	356	407	−12.5%	1.467	3.80	242.7/sq mi (93.7/km^{2})
Lomax	Village	Henderson	404	454	−11.0%	1.189	3.08	339.8/sq mi (131.2/km^{2})
Lombard	Village	DuPage	44,476	43,165	+3.0%	10.220	26.47	4,351.9/sq mi (1,680.3/km^{2})
London Mills	Village	Fulton; Knox	350	392	−10.7%	0.684	1.77	511.7/sq mi (197.6/km^{2})
Long Creek	Village	Macon	1,261	1,328	−5.0%	2.825	7.32	446.4/sq mi (172.3/km^{2})
Long Grove	Village	Lake	8,366	8,043	+4.0%	12.387	32.08	675.4/sq mi (260.8/km^{2})
Long Point	Village	Livingston	204	226	−9.7%	0.185	0.48	1,102.7/sq mi (425.8/km^{2})
Longview	Village	Champaign	112	153	−26.8%	0.247	0.64	453.4/sq mi (175.1/km^{2})
Loraine	Village	Adams	300	313	−4.2%	0.844	2.19	355.5/sq mi (137.2/km^{2})
Lostant	Village	LaSalle	423	498	−15.1%	1.122	2.91	377.0/sq mi (145.6/km^{2})
Louisville†	Village	Clay	1,136	1,139	−0.3%	0.828	2.14	1,372.0/sq mi (529.7/km^{2})
Loves Park	City	Winnebago; Boone	23,397	23,996	−2.5%	16.325	42.28	1,433.2/sq mi (553.4/km^{2})
Lovington	Village	Moultrie	1,069	1,130	−5.4%	0.544	1.41	1,965.1/sq mi (758.7/km^{2})
Ludlow	Village	Champaign	308	371	−17.0%	0.397	1.03	775.8/sq mi (299.5/km^{2})
Lyndon	Village	Whiteside	537	648	−17.1%	0.757	1.96	709.4/sq mi (273.9/km^{2})
Lynnville	Village	Morgan	96	117	−17.9%	0.077	0.20	1,246.8/sq mi (481.4/km^{2})
Lynwood	Village	Cook	9,116	9,007	+1.2%	4.964	12.86	1,836.4/sq mi (709.0/km^{2})
Lyons	Village	Cook	10,817	10,729	+0.8%	2.207	5.72	4,901.2/sq mi (1,892.4/km^{2})
Macedonia	Village	Franklin; Hamilton	30	63	−52.4%	0.266	0.69	112.8/sq mi (43.5/km^{2})
Machesney Park	Village	Winnebago	22,950	23,499	−2.3%	12.685	32.85	1,809.2/sq mi (698.5/km^{2})
Mackinaw	Village	Tazewell	1,879	1,950	−3.6%	1.189	3.08	1,580.3/sq mi (610.2/km^{2})
Macomb†	City	McDonough	15,051	19,288	−22.0%	10.570	27.38	1,423.9/sq mi (549.8/km^{2})
Macon	City	Macon	1,177	1,138	+3.4%	1.451	3.76	811.2/sq mi (313.2/km^{2})
Madison	City	Madison; St. Clair	3,171	3,891	−18.5%	13.955	36.14	227.2/sq mi (87.7/km^{2})
Maeystown	Village	Monroe	150	157	−4.5%	0.298	0.77	503.4/sq mi (194.3/km^{2})
Magnolia	Village	Putnam	256	260	−1.5%	0.313	0.81	817.9/sq mi (315.8/km^{2})
Mahomet	Village	Champaign	9,434	7,258	+30.0%	9.722	25.18	970.4/sq mi (374.7/km^{2})
Makanda	Village	Jackson	547	561	−2.5%	5.281	13.68	103.6/sq mi (40.0/km^{2})
Malden	Village	Bureau	318	362	−12.2%	0.272	0.70	1,169.1/sq mi (451.4/km^{2})
Malta	Village	DeKalb	1,143	1,164	−1.8%	0.612	1.59	1,867.6/sq mi (721.1/km^{2})
Manchester	Village	Scott	265	292	−9.2%	1.063	2.75	249.3/sq mi (96.3/km^{2})
Manhattan	Village	Will	9,385	7,051	+33.1%	6.681	17.30	1,404.7/sq mi (542.4/km^{2})
Manito	Village	Mason	1,552	1,642	−5.5%	1.513	3.92	1,025.8/sq mi (396.1/km^{2})
Manlius	Village	Bureau	298	359	−17.0%	0.319	0.83	934.2/sq mi (360.7/km^{2})
Mansfield	Village	Piatt	928	906	+2.4%	0.508	1.32	1,826.8/sq mi (705.3/km^{2})
Manteno	Village	Kankakee	9,210	9,204	+0.1%	5.344	13.84	1,723.4/sq mi (665.4/km^{2})
Maple Park	Village	Kane; DeKalb	1,433	1,310	+9.4%	2.154	5.58	665.3/sq mi (256.9/km^{2})
Mapleton	Village	Peoria	261	270	−3.3%	0.885	2.29	294.9/sq mi (113.9/km^{2})
Maquon	Village	Knox	218	284	−23.2%	0.162	0.42	1,345.7/sq mi (519.6/km^{2})
Marengo	City	McHenry	7,568	7,648	−1.0%	8.536	22.11	886.6/sq mi (342.3/km^{2})
Marietta	Village	Fulton	101	112	−9.8%	0.273	0.71	370.0/sq mi (142.8/km^{2})
Marine	Village	Madison	912	960	−5.0%	0.746	1.93	1,222.5/sq mi (472.0/km^{2})
Marion†	City	Williamson	16,855	17,193	−2.0%	14.392	37.28	1,171.1/sq mi (452.2/km^{2})
Marissa	Village	St. Clair	1,833	1,979	−7.4%	7.212	18.68	254.2/sq mi (98.1/km^{2})
Mark	Village	Putnam	519	555	−6.5%	1.065	2.76	487.3/sq mi (188.2/km^{2})
Markham	City	Cook	11,661	12,508	−6.8%	5.405	14.00	2,157.4/sq mi (833.0/km^{2})
Maroa	City	Macon	1,577	1,801	−12.4%	1.763	4.57	894.5/sq mi (345.4/km^{2})
Marquette Heights	City	Tazewell	2,541	2,824	−10.0%	0.974	2.52	2,608.8/sq mi (1,007.3/km^{2})
Marseilles	City	LaSalle	4,845	5,094	−4.9%	9.080	23.52	533.6/sq mi (206.0/km^{2})
Marshall†	City	Clark	3,947	3,933	+0.4%	3.666	9.49	1,076.7/sq mi (415.7/km^{2})
Martinsville	City	Clark	1,118	1,167	−4.2%	2.021	5.23	553.2/sq mi (213.6/km^{2})
Martinton	Village	Iroquois	334	381	−12.3%	0.274	0.71	1,219.0/sq mi (470.7/km^{2})
Maryville	Village	Madison	8,221	7,487	+9.8%	5.676	14.70	1,448.4/sq mi (559.2/km^{2})
Mascoutah	City	St. Clair	8,754	7,483	+17.0%	9.578	24.81	914.0/sq mi (352.9/km^{2})
Mason	Town	Effingham	323	345	−6.4%	1.287	3.33	251.0/sq mi (96.9/km^{2})
Mason City	City	Mason	2,077	2,343	−11.4%	1.014	2.63	2,048.3/sq mi (790.9/km^{2})
Matherville	Village	Mercer	707	723	−2.2%	0.391	1.01	1,808.2/sq mi (698.1/km^{2})
Matteson	Village	Cook	19,073	19,009	+0.3%	9.285	24.05	2,054.2/sq mi (793.1/km^{2})
Mattoon	City	Coles	16,870	18,555	−9.1%	10.314	26.71	1,635.6/sq mi (631.5/km^{2})
Maunie	Village	White	91	139	−34.5%	0.159	0.41	572.3/sq mi (221.0/km^{2})
Maywood	Village	Cook	23,512	24,090	−2.4%	2.717	7.04	8,653.7/sq mi (3,341.2/km^{2})
Mazon	Village	Grundy	979	1,015	−3.5%	0.602	1.56	1,626.2/sq mi (627.9/km^{2})
McClure	Village	Alexander	256	402	−36.3%	1.528	3.96	167.5/sq mi (64.7/km^{2})
McCook	Village	Cook	249	228	+9.2%	2.614	6.77	95.3/sq mi (36.8/km^{2})
McCullom Lake	Village	McHenry	988	1,049	−5.8%	0.347	0.90	2,847.3/sq mi (1,099.3/km^{2})
McHenry	City	McHenry	27,135	26,992	+0.5%	14.499	37.55	1,871.5/sq mi (722.6/km^{2})
McLean	Village	McLean	743	830	−10.5%	1.177	3.05	631.3/sq mi (243.7/km^{2})
McLeansboro†	City	Hamilton	2,675	2,883	−7.2%	2.817	7.30	949.6/sq mi (366.6/km^{2})
McNabb	Village	Putnam	275	285	−3.5%	0.177	0.46	1,553.7/sq mi (599.9/km^{2})
Mechanicsburg	Village	Sangamon	662	590	+12.2%	1.036	2.68	639.0/sq mi (246.7/km^{2})
Media	Village	Henderson	121	107	+13.1%	1.698	4.40	71.3/sq mi (27.5/km^{2})
Medora	Village	Macoupin	379	419	−9.5%	0.380	0.98	997.4/sq mi (385.1/km^{2})
Melrose Park	Village	Cook	24,796	25,411	−2.4%	4.353	11.27	5,696.3/sq mi (2,199.4/km^{2})
Melvin	Village	Ford	416	452	−8.0%	0.346	0.90	1,202.3/sq mi (464.2/km^{2})
Mendon	Village	Adams	872	953	−8.5%	0.857	2.22	1,017.5/sq mi (392.9/km^{2})
Mendota	City	LaSalle	7,061	7,372	−4.2%	5.056	13.09	1,396.6/sq mi (539.2/km^{2})
Menominee	Village	Jo Daviess	211	248	−14.9%	1.914	4.96	110.2/sq mi (42.6/km^{2})
Meredosia	Village	Morgan	826	1,044	−20.9%	0.864	2.24	956.0/sq mi (369.1/km^{2})
Merrionette Park	Village	Cook	1,969	1,900	+3.6%	0.375	0.97	5,250.7/sq mi (2,027.3/km^{2})
Metamora	Village	Woodford	3,904	3,636	+7.4%	2.263	5.86	1,725.1/sq mi (666.1/km^{2})
Metcalf	Village	Edgar	139	189	−26.5%	0.594	1.54	234.0/sq mi (90.4/km^{2})
Metropolis†	City	Massac	5,969	6,537	−8.7%	6.020	15.59	991.5/sq mi (382.8/km^{2})
Mettawa	Village	Lake	533	547	−2.6%	5.449	14.11	97.8/sq mi (37.8/km^{2})
Middletown	Village	Logan	329	324	+1.5%	0.341	0.88	964.8/sq mi (372.5/km^{2})
Midlothian	Village	Cook	14,325	14,819	−3.3%	2.819	7.30	5,081.6/sq mi (1,962.0/km^{2})
Milan	Village	Rock Island	5,097	5,099	0.0%	6.254	16.20	815.0/sq mi (314.7/km^{2})
Milford	Village	Iroquois	1,158	1,306	−11.3%	0.671	1.74	1,725.8/sq mi (666.3/km^{2})
Millbrook	Village	Kendall	277	335	−17.3%	1.846	4.78	150.1/sq mi (57.9/km^{2})
Mill Creek	Village	Union	59	65	−9.2%	0.376	0.97	156.9/sq mi (60.6/km^{2})
Milledgeville	Village	Carroll	1,026	1,032	−0.6%	0.690	1.79	1,487.0/sq mi (574.1/km^{2})
Millington	Village	Kendall; LaSalle	617	665	−7.2%	0.708	1.83	871.5/sq mi (336.5/km^{2})
Mill Shoals	Village	White; Wayne	176	215	−18.1%	0.767	1.99	229.5/sq mi (88.6/km^{2})
Millstadt	Village	St. Clair	4,071	4,011	+1.5%	3.491	9.04	1,166.1/sq mi (450.2/km^{2})
Milton	Village	Pike	214	271	−21.0%	0.386	1.00	554.4/sq mi (214.1/km^{2})
Mineral	Village	Bureau	206	237	−13.1%	0.553	1.43	372.5/sq mi (143.8/km^{2})
Minier	Village	Tazewell	1,154	1,252	−7.8%	0.569	1.47	2,028.1/sq mi (783.1/km^{2})
Minonk	City	Woodford	1,928	2,078	−7.2%	2.400	6.22	803.3/sq mi (310.2/km^{2})
Minooka	Village	Grundy; Will	12,758	10,924	+16.8%	9.405	24.36	1,356.5/sq mi (523.8/km^{2})
Modesto	Village	Macoupin	182	189	−3.7%	0.559	1.45	325.6/sq mi (125.7/km^{2})
Mokena	Village	Will	19,887	18,740	+6.1%	8.689	22.50	2,288.8/sq mi (883.7/km^{2})
Moline	City	Rock Island	42,985	43,483	−1.1%	16.753	43.39	2,565.8/sq mi (990.7/km^{2})
Momence	City	Kankakee	3,117	3,310	−5.8%	1.569	4.06	1,986.6/sq mi (767.0/km^{2})
Monee	Village	Will	5,128	5,148	−0.4%	4.472	11.58	1,146.7/sq mi (442.7/km^{2})
Monmouth†	City	Warren	8,902	9,444	−5.7%	4.242	10.99	2,098.5/sq mi (810.3/km^{2})
Monroe Center	Village	Ogle	411	471	−12.7%	1.212	3.14	339.1/sq mi (130.9/km^{2})
Montgomery	Village	Kane; Kendall	20,262	18,438	+9.9%	9.299	24.08	2,178.9/sq mi (841.3/km^{2})
Monticello†	City	Piatt	5,941	5,548	+7.1%	3.852	9.98	1,542.3/sq mi (595.5/km^{2})
Montrose	Village	Effingham	210	201	+4.5%	0.637	1.65	329.7/sq mi (127.3/km^{2})
Morris†	City	Grundy	14,163	13,636	+3.9%	9.909	25.66	1,429.3/sq mi (551.9/km^{2})
Morrison†	City	Whiteside	4,085	4,188	−2.5%	2.518	6.52	1,622.3/sq mi (626.4/km^{2})
Morrisonville	Village	Christian	997	1,056	−5.6%	1.035	2.68	963.3/sq mi (371.9/km^{2})
Morton	Village	Tazewell	17,117	16,267	+5.2%	12.808	33.17	1,336.4/sq mi (516.0/km^{2})
Morton Grove	Village	Cook	25,297	23,270	+8.7%	5.088	13.18	4,971.9/sq mi (1,919.7/km^{2})
Mound City	City	Pulaski	526	588	−10.5%	0.675	1.75	779.3/sq mi (300.9/km^{2})
Mounds	City	Pulaski	661	810	−18.4%	1.207	3.13	547.6/sq mi (211.4/km^{2})
Mound Station	Village	Brown	117	122	−4.1%	0.519	1.34	225.4/sq mi (87.0/km^{2})
Mount Auburn	Village	Christian	452	480	−5.8%	0.997	2.58	453.4/sq mi (175.0/km^{2})
Mount Carmel†	City	Wabash	7,015	7,284	−3.7%	4.809	12.46	1,458.7/sq mi (563.2/km^{2})
Mount Carroll†	City	Carroll	1,479	1,717	−13.9%	2.003	5.19	738.4/sq mi (285.1/km^{2})
Mount Clare	Village	Macoupin	311	278	+11.9%	1.538	3.98	202.2/sq mi (78.1/km^{2})
Mount Erie	Village	Wayne	98	88	+11.4%	0.384	0.99	255.2/sq mi (98.5/km^{2})
Mount Morris	Village	Ogle	2,861	2,998	−4.6%	1.560	4.04	1,834.0/sq mi (708.1/km^{2})
Mount Olive	City	Macoupin	2,015	2,099	−4.0%	1.153	2.99	1,747.6/sq mi (674.8/km^{2})
Mount Prospect	Village	Cook	56,852	54,167	+5.0%	10.719	27.76	5,303.9/sq mi (2,047.8/km^{2})
Mount Pulaski	City	Logan	1,537	1,566	−1.9%	1.134	2.94	1,355.4/sq mi (523.3/km^{2})
Mount Sterling†	City	Brown	2,006	2,025	−0.9%	1.108	2.87	1,810.5/sq mi (699.0/km^{2})
Mount Vernon†	City	Jefferson	14,600	15,277	−4.4%	14.583	37.77	1,001.2/sq mi (386.6/km^{2})
Mount Zion	Village	Macon	6,019	5,833	+3.2%	4.227	10.95	1,423.9/sq mi (549.8/km^{2})
Moweaqua	Village	Shelby; Christian	1,764	1,831	−3.7%	2.123	5.50	830.9/sq mi (320.8/km^{2})
Muddy	Village	Saline	61	68	−10.3%	0.303	0.78	201.3/sq mi (77.7/km^{2})
Mulberry Grove	Village	Bond	520	634	−18.0%	1.003	2.60	518.4/sq mi (200.2/km^{2})
Muncie	Village	Vermilion	157	146	+7.5%	0.179	0.46	877.1/sq mi (338.6/km^{2})
Mundelein	Village	Lake	31,560	31,064	+1.6%	9.585	24.83	3,292.6/sq mi (1,271.3/km^{2})
Murphysboro†	City	Jackson	7,093	7,970	−11.0%	5.248	13.59	1,351.6/sq mi (521.8/km^{2})
Murrayville	Village	Morgan	567	587	−3.4%	0.496	1.28	1,143.1/sq mi (441.4/km^{2})
Naperville	City	DuPage; Will	149,540	141,853	+5.4%	39.077	101.21	3,826.8/sq mi (1,477.5/km^{2})
Naplate	Village	LaSalle	412	496	−16.9%	0.160	0.41	2,575.0/sq mi (994.2/km^{2})
Naples	Town	Scott	100	130	−23.1%	0.605	1.57	165.3/sq mi (63.8/km^{2})
Nashville†	City	Washington	3,105	3,258	−4.7%	3.079	7.97	1,008.4/sq mi (389.4/km^{2})
Nason	City	Jefferson	199	236	−15.7%	0.911	2.36	218.4/sq mi (84.3/km^{2})
Nauvoo	City	Hancock	950	1,149	−17.3%	3.386	8.77	280.6/sq mi (108.3/km^{2})
Nebo	Village	Pike	282	340	−17.1%	0.434	1.12	649.8/sq mi (250.9/km^{2})
Nelson	Village	Lee	127	170	−25.3%	0.216	0.56	588.0/sq mi (227.0/km^{2})
Neoga	City	Cumberland	1,398	1,636	−14.5%	1.390	3.60	1,005.8/sq mi (388.3/km^{2})
Neponset	Village	Bureau	427	473	−9.7%	1.016	2.63	420.3/sq mi (162.3/km^{2})
Newark	Village	Kendall	973	992	−1.9%	1.124	2.91	865.7/sq mi (334.2/km^{2})
New Athens	Village	St. Clair	1,955	2,054	−4.8%	2.112	5.47	925.7/sq mi (357.4/km^{2})
New Baden	Village	Clinton; St. Clair	3,428	3,349	+2.4%	1.825	4.73	1,878.4/sq mi (725.2/km^{2})
New Bedford	Village	Bureau	76	75	+1.3%	0.155	0.40	490.3/sq mi (189.3/km^{2})
New Berlin	Village	Sangamon	1,381	1,346	+2.6%	1.130	2.93	1,222.1/sq mi (471.9/km^{2})
New Boston	City	Mercer	613	683	−10.2%	0.941	2.44	651.4/sq mi (251.5/km^{2})
New Burnside	Village	Johnson	153	211	−27.5%	1.045	2.71	146.4/sq mi (56.5/km^{2})
New Canton	Town	Pike	334	359	−7.0%	0.881	2.28	379.1/sq mi (146.4/km^{2})
New Douglas	Village	Madison	350	319	+9.7%	1.048	2.71	334.0/sq mi (128.9/km^{2})
New Grand Chain	Village	Pulaski	150	210	−28.6%	1.043	2.70	143.8/sq mi (55.5/km^{2})
New Haven	Village	Gallatin	399	433	−7.9%	1.244	3.22	320.7/sq mi (123.8/km^{2})
New Holland	Village	Logan	275	269	+2.2%	0.310	0.80	887.1/sq mi (342.5/km^{2})
New Lenox	Village	Will	27,214	24,394	+11.6%	15.722	40.72	1,731.0/sq mi (668.3/km^{2})
Newman	City	Douglas	778	865	−10.1%	0.613	1.59	1,269.2/sq mi (490.0/km^{2})
New Milford	Village	Winnebago	794	697	+13.9%	2.543	6.59	312.2/sq mi (120.6/km^{2})
New Minden	Village	Washington	175	215	−18.6%	0.277	0.72	631.8/sq mi (243.9/km^{2})
New Salem	Village	Pike	121	137	−11.7%	1.049	2.72	115.3/sq mi (44.5/km^{2})
Newton†	City	Jasper	2,777	2,849	−2.5%	2.088	5.41	1,330.0/sq mi (513.5/km^{2})
Niantic	Village	Macon	612	707	−13.4%	1.039	2.69	589.0/sq mi (227.4/km^{2})
Niles	Village	Cook	30,912	29,803	+3.7%	5.848	15.15	5,285.9/sq mi (2,040.9/km^{2})
Nilwood	Town	Macoupin	201	239	−15.9%	0.465	1.20	432.3/sq mi (166.9/km^{2})
Noble	Village	Richland	633	677	−6.5%	1.017	2.63	622.4/sq mi (240.3/km^{2})
Nokomis	City	Montgomery	2,142	2,256	−5.1%	1.261	3.27	1,698.7/sq mi (655.9/km^{2})
Nora	Village	Jo Daviess	107	121	−11.6%	0.830	2.15	128.9/sq mi (49.8/km^{2})
Normal	Town	McLean	52,736	52,497	+0.5%	18.296	47.39	2,882.4/sq mi (1,112.9/km^{2})
Norridge	Village	Cook	15,251	14,572	+4.7%	1.808	4.68	8,435.3/sq mi (3,256.9/km^{2})
Norris	Village	Fulton	173	213	−18.8%	0.283	0.73	611.3/sq mi (236.0/km^{2})
Norris City	Village	White	1,145	1,275	−10.2%	1.172	3.04	977.0/sq mi (377.2/km^{2})
North Aurora	Village	Kane	18,261	16,760	+9.0%	7.557	19.57	2,416.4/sq mi (933.0/km^{2})
North Barrington	Village	Lake	3,171	3,047	+4.1%	4.712	12.20	673.0/sq mi (259.8/km^{2})
Northbrook	Village	Cook	35,222	33,170	+6.2%	13.240	34.29	2,660.3/sq mi (1,027.1/km^{2})
North Chicago	City	Lake	30,759	32,574	−5.6%	7.993	20.70	3,848.2/sq mi (1,485.8/km^{2})
North City	Village	Franklin	509	608	−16.3%	2.171	5.62	234.5/sq mi (90.5/km^{2})
Northfield	Village	Cook	5,751	5,420	+6.1%	3.230	8.37	1,780.5/sq mi (687.5/km^{2})
North Henderson	Village	Mercer	162	187	−13.4%	0.226	0.59	716.8/sq mi (276.8/km^{2})
Northlake	City	Cook	12,840	12,323	+4.2%	3.176	8.23	4,042.8/sq mi (1,560.9/km^{2})
North Pekin	Village	Tazewell	1,478	1,573	−6.0%	1.392	3.61	1,061.8/sq mi (410.0/km^{2})
North Riverside	Village	Cook	7,426	6,672	+11.3%	1.644	4.26	4,517.0/sq mi (1,744.0/km^{2})
North Utica	Village	LaSalle	1,323	1,352	−2.1%	3.455	8.95	382.9/sq mi (147.8/km^{2})
Norwood	Village	Peoria	437	478	−8.6%	0.307	0.80	1,423.5/sq mi (549.6/km^{2})
Oak Brook	Village	DuPage	8,163	7,883	+3.6%	7.959	20.61	1,025.6/sq mi (396.0/km^{2})
Oakbrook Terrace	City	DuPage	2,751	2,134	+28.9%	1.306	3.38	2,106.4/sq mi (813.3/km^{2})
Oakdale	Village	Washington	199	221	−10.0%	1.582	4.10	125.8/sq mi (48.6/km^{2})
Oakford	Village	Menard	234	286	−18.2%	0.249	0.64	939.8/sq mi (362.8/km^{2})
Oak Forest	City	Cook	27,478	27,962	−1.7%	6.021	15.59	4,563.7/sq mi (1,762.1/km^{2})
Oak Grove	Village	Rock Island	476	396	+20.2%	0.658	1.70	723.4/sq mi (279.3/km^{2})
Oakland	City	Coles	739	880	−16.0%	0.783	2.03	943.8/sq mi (364.4/km^{2})
Oak Lawn	Village	Cook	58,362	56,690	+2.9%	8.571	22.20	6,809.2/sq mi (2,629.1/km^{2})
Oak Park	Village	Cook	54,583	51,878	+5.2%	4.700	12.17	11,613.4/sq mi (4,484.0/km^{2})
Oakwood	Village	Vermilion	1,325	1,595	−16.9%	0.928	2.40	1,427.8/sq mi (551.3/km^{2})
Oakwood Hills	Village	McHenry	2,076	2,083	−0.3%	1.088	2.82	1,908.1/sq mi (736.7/km^{2})
Oblong	Village	Crawford	1,371	1,466	−6.5%	1.086	2.81	1,262.4/sq mi (487.4/km^{2})
Oconee	Village	Shelby	141	180	−21.7%	0.356	0.92	396.1/sq mi (152.9/km^{2})
Odell	Village	Livingston	1,003	1,046	−4.1%	1.077	2.79	931.3/sq mi (359.6/km^{2})
Odin	Village	Marion	935	1,076	−13.1%	1.003	2.60	932.2/sq mi (359.9/km^{2})
O'Fallon	City	St. Clair	32,289	28,281	+14.2%	15.559	40.30	2,075.3/sq mi (801.3/km^{2})
Ogden	Village	Champaign	729	810	−10.0%	0.588	1.52	1,239.8/sq mi (478.7/km^{2})
Oglesby	City	LaSalle	3,712	3,791	−2.1%	4.992	12.93	743.6/sq mi (287.1/km^{2})
Ohio	Village	Bureau	465	513	−9.4%	0.753	1.95	617.5/sq mi (238.4/km^{2})
Ohlman	Village	Montgomery	109	135	−19.3%	0.322	0.83	338.5/sq mi (130.7/km^{2})
Okawville	Village	Washington	1,369	1,434	−4.5%	2.025	5.24	676.0/sq mi (261.0/km^{2})
Old Mill Creek	Village	Lake	162	178	−9.0%	10.671	27.64	15.2/sq mi (5.9/km^{2})
Old Ripley	Village	Bond	82	108	−24.1%	0.154	0.40	532.5/sq mi (205.6/km^{2})
Old Shawneetown	Village	Gallatin	113	193	−41.5%	0.510	1.32	221.6/sq mi (85.5/km^{2})
Olmsted	Village	Pulaski	285	333	−14.4%	3.365	8.72	84.7/sq mi (32.7/km^{2})
Olney†	City	Richland	8,701	9,115	−4.5%	6.931	17.95	1,255.4/sq mi (484.7/km^{2})
Olympia Fields	Village	Cook	4,718	4,988	−5.4%	2.939	7.61	1,605.3/sq mi (619.8/km^{2})
Omaha	Village	Gallatin	209	266	−21.4%	0.744	1.93	280.9/sq mi (108.5/km^{2})
Onarga	Village	Iroquois	1,333	1,368	−2.6%	1.674	4.34	796.3/sq mi (307.5/km^{2})
Oneida	City	Knox	696	700	−0.6%	0.763	1.98	912.2/sq mi (352.2/km^{2})
Oquawka†	Village	Henderson	1,134	1,371	−17.3%	1.469	3.80	772.0/sq mi (298.1/km^{2})
Orangeville	Village	Stephenson	766	793	−3.4%	0.676	1.75	1,133.1/sq mi (437.5/km^{2})
Oreana	Village	Macon	891	875	+1.8%	0.468	1.21	1,903.8/sq mi (735.1/km^{2})
Oregon†	City	Ogle	3,604	3,721	−3.1%	1.927	4.99	1,870.3/sq mi (722.1/km^{2})
Orient	City	Franklin	327	358	−8.7%	0.745	1.93	438.9/sq mi (169.5/km^{2})
Orion	Village	Henry	1,754	1,861	−5.7%	0.944	2.44	1,858.1/sq mi (717.4/km^{2})
Orland Hills	Village	Cook	6,893	7,149	−3.6%	1.145	2.97	6,020.1/sq mi (2,324.4/km^{2})
Orland Park	Village	Cook; Will	58,703	56,767	+3.4%	22.028	57.05	2,664.9/sq mi (1,028.9/km^{2})
Oswego	Village	Kendall	34,585	30,355	+13.9%	14.888	38.56	2,323.0/sq mi (896.9/km^{2})
Ottawa†	City	LaSalle	18,840	18,768	+0.4%	14.657	37.96	1,285.4/sq mi (496.3/km^{2})
Otterville	Town	Jersey	87	126	−31.0%	1.006	2.61	86.5/sq mi (33.4/km^{2})
Owaneco	Village	Christian	209	239	−12.6%	0.458	1.19	456.3/sq mi (176.2/km^{2})
Palatine	Village	Cook	67,908	68,557	−0.9%	13.598	35.22	4,994.0/sq mi (1,928.2/km^{2})
Palestine	Village	Crawford	1,233	1,369	−9.9%	0.789	2.04	1,562.7/sq mi (603.4/km^{2})
Palmer	Village	Christian	216	229	−5.7%	0.995	2.58	217.1/sq mi (83.8/km^{2})
Palmyra	Village	Macoupin	605	698	−13.3%	0.999	2.59	605.6/sq mi (233.8/km^{2})
Palos Heights	City	Cook	12,068	12,515	−3.6%	3.774	9.77	3,197.7/sq mi (1,234.6/km^{2})
Palos Hills	City	Cook	18,530	17,484	+6.0%	4.246	11.00	4,364.1/sq mi (1,685.0/km^{2})
Palos Park	Village	Cook	4,899	4,847	+1.1%	6.445	16.69	760.1/sq mi (293.5/km^{2})
Pana	City	Christian; Shelby	5,199	5,847	−11.1%	3.855	9.98	1,348.6/sq mi (520.7/km^{2})
Panama	Village	Bond; Montgomery	337	343	−1.7%	0.365	0.95	923.3/sq mi (356.5/km^{2})
Panola	Village	Woodford	47	45	+4.4%	0.429	1.11	109.6/sq mi (42.3/km^{2})
Papineau	Village	Iroquois	133	171	−22.2%	0.208	0.54	639.4/sq mi (246.9/km^{2})
Paris†	City	Edgar	8,291	8,837	−6.2%	5.676	14.70	1,460.7/sq mi (564.0/km^{2})
Park City	City	Lake	7,885	7,570	+4.2%	1.157	3.00	6,815.0/sq mi (2,631.3/km^{2})
Parkersburg	Village	Richland	186	199	−6.5%	0.826	2.14	225.2/sq mi (86.9/km^{2})
Park Forest	Village	Cook; Will	21,687	21,975	−1.3%	4.961	12.85	4,371.5/sq mi (1,687.8/km^{2})
Park Ridge	City	Cook	39,656	37,480	+5.8%	7.088	18.36	5,594.8/sq mi (2,160.2/km^{2})
Patoka	Village	Marion	525	584	−10.1%	1.115	2.89	470.9/sq mi (181.8/km^{2})
Pawnee	Village	Sangamon	2,678	2,739	−2.2%	1.332	3.45	2,010.5/sq mi (776.3/km^{2})
Paw Paw	Village	Lee	830	870	−4.6%	0.572	1.48	1,451.0/sq mi (560.3/km^{2})
Paxton†	City	Ford	4,450	4,473	−0.5%	3.036	7.86	1,465.7/sq mi (565.9/km^{2})
Payson	Village	Adams	1,025	1,026	−0.1%	1.170	3.03	876.1/sq mi (338.3/km^{2})
Pearl	Village	Pike	103	138	−25.4%	1.505	3.90	68.4/sq mi (26.4/km^{2})
Pearl City	Village	Stephenson	790	838	−5.7%	0.641	1.66	1,232.4/sq mi (475.9/km^{2})
Pecatonica	Village	Winnebago	2,090	2,195	−4.8%	1.283	3.32	1,629.0/sq mi (629.0/km^{2})
Pekin†	City	Tazewell	31,731	34,094	−6.9%	15.716	40.70	2,019.0/sq mi (779.5/km^{2})
Peoria†	City	Peoria	113,150	115,007	−1.6%	47.965	124.23	2,359.0/sq mi (910.8/km^{2})
Peoria Heights	Village	Peoria; Woodford	5,908	6,156	−4.0%	2.492	6.45	2,370.8/sq mi (915.4/km^{2})
Peotone	Village	Will	4,150	4,142	+0.2%	2.001	5.18	2,074.0/sq mi (800.8/km^{2})
Percy	Village	Randolph	906	970	−6.6%	0.979	2.54	925.4/sq mi (357.3/km^{2})
Perry	Village	Pike	314	397	−20.9%	0.386	1.00	813.5/sq mi (314.1/km^{2})
Peru	City	LaSalle	9,896	10,295	−3.9%	9.987	25.87	990.9/sq mi (382.6/km^{2})
Pesotum	Village	Champaign	550	551	−0.2%	0.569	1.47	966.6/sq mi (373.2/km^{2})
Petersburg†	City	Menard	2,258	2,260	−0.1%	1.562	4.05	1,445.6/sq mi (558.1/km^{2})
Phillipstown	Village	White	34	44	−22.7%	0.270	0.70	125.9/sq mi (48.6/km^{2})
Philo	Village	Champaign	1,392	1,466	−5.0%	0.829	2.15	1,679.1/sq mi (648.3/km^{2})
Phoenix	Village	Cook	1,708	1,964	−13.0%	0.464	1.20	3,681.0/sq mi (1,421.3/km^{2})
Pierron	Village	Bond; Madison	459	600	−23.5%	0.734	1.90	625.3/sq mi (241.4/km^{2})
Pinckneyville†	City	Perry	5,066	5,648	−10.3%	4.106	10.63	1,233.8/sq mi (476.4/km^{2})
Pingree Grove	Village	Kane	10,365	4,532	+128.7%	3.637	9.42	2,849.9/sq mi (1,100.3/km^{2})
Piper City	Village	Ford	745	826	−9.8%	0.555	1.44	1,342.3/sq mi (518.3/km^{2})
Pittsburg	Village	Williamson	565	572	−1.2%	2.065	5.35	273.6/sq mi (105.6/km^{2})
Pittsfield†	City	Pike	4,206	4,576	−8.1%	4.782	12.39	879.5/sq mi (339.6/km^{2})
Plainfield	Village	Will	44,762	39,581	+13.1%	24.722	64.03	1,810.6/sq mi (699.1/km^{2})
Plainville	Village	Adams	271	264	+2.7%	0.235	0.61	1,153.2/sq mi (445.2/km^{2})
Plano	City	Kendall	11,847	10,856	+9.1%	8.979	23.26	1,319.4/sq mi (509.4/km^{2})
Plattville	Village	Kendall	220	242	−9.1%	2.259	5.85	97.4/sq mi (37.6/km^{2})
Pleasant Hill	Village	Pike	924	966	−4.3%	0.765	1.98	1,207.8/sq mi (466.4/km^{2})
Pleasant Plains	Village	Sangamon	808	802	+0.7%	1.335	3.46	605.2/sq mi (233.7/km^{2})
Plymouth	Village	Hancock	436	505	−13.7%	0.565	1.46	771.7/sq mi (297.9/km^{2})
Pocahontas	Village	Bond	697	784	−11.1%	0.783	2.03	890.2/sq mi (343.7/km^{2})
Polo	City	Ogle	2,291	2,355	−2.7%	1.334	3.46	1,717.4/sq mi (663.1/km^{2})
Pontiac†	City	Livingston	11,150	11,931	−6.5%	8.382	21.71	1,330.2/sq mi (513.6/km^{2})
Pontoon Beach	Village	Madison	5,876	5,836	+0.7%	9.960	25.80	590.0/sq mi (227.8/km^{2})
Pontoosuc	Village	Hancock	99	146	−32.2%	1.406	3.64	70.4/sq mi (27.2/km^{2})
Poplar Grove	Village	Boone	5,049	5,023	+0.5%	7.663	19.85	658.9/sq mi (254.4/km^{2})
Port Barrington	Village	McHenry; Lake	1,584	1,517	+4.4%	1.160	3.00	1,365.5/sq mi (527.2/km^{2})
Port Byron	Village	Rock Island	1,668	1,647	+1.3%	2.428	6.29	687.0/sq mi (265.2/km^{2})
Posen	Village	Cook	5,632	5,987	−5.9%	1.169	3.03	4,817.8/sq mi (1,860.2/km^{2})
Potomac	Village	Vermilion	689	750	−8.1%	0.488	1.26	1,411.9/sq mi (545.1/km^{2})
Prairie City	Village	McDonough	407	379	+7.4%	1.008	2.61	403.8/sq mi (155.9/km^{2})
Prairie du Rocher	Village	Randolph	502	604	−16.9%	0.571	1.48	879.2/sq mi (339.4/km^{2})
Prairie Grove	Village	McHenry	1,963	1,904	+3.1%	5.677	14.70	345.8/sq mi (133.5/km^{2})
Princeton†	City	Bureau	7,832	7,660	+2.2%	8.240	21.34	950.5/sq mi (367.0/km^{2})
Princeville	Village	Peoria	1,636	1,738	−5.9%	1.695	4.39	965.2/sq mi (372.7/km^{2})
Prophetstown	City	Whiteside	1,946	2,080	−6.4%	1.339	3.47	1,453.3/sq mi (561.1/km^{2})
Prospect Heights	City	Cook	16,058	16,256	−1.2%	4.256	11.02	3,773.0/sq mi (1,456.8/km^{2})
Pulaski	Village	Pulaski	154	206	−25.2%	1.310	3.39	117.6/sq mi (45.4/km^{2})
Quincy†	City	Adams	39,463	40,633	−2.9%	15.765	40.83	2,503.2/sq mi (966.5/km^{2})
Radom	Village	Washington	183	220	−16.8%	1.048	2.71	174.6/sq mi (67.4/km^{2})
Raleigh	Village	Saline	284	350	−18.9%	1.976	5.12	143.7/sq mi (55.5/km^{2})
Ramsey	Village	Fayette	911	1,037	−12.2%	1.111	2.88	820.0/sq mi (316.6/km^{2})
Rankin	Village	Vermilion	495	561	−11.8%	0.579	1.50	854.9/sq mi (330.1/km^{2})
Ransom	Village	LaSalle	308	384	−19.8%	0.999	2.59	308.3/sq mi (119.0/km^{2})
Rantoul	Village	Champaign	12,371	12,941	−4.4%	8.490	21.99	1,457.1/sq mi (562.6/km^{2})
Rapids City	Village	Rock Island	964	959	+0.5%	1.626	4.21	592.9/sq mi (228.9/km^{2})
Raritan	Village	Henderson	102	138	−26.1%	0.095	0.25	1,073.7/sq mi (414.6/km^{2})
Raymond	Village	Montgomery	949	1,006	−5.7%	1.258	3.26	754.4/sq mi (291.3/km^{2})
Red Bud	City	Randolph	3,804	3,698	+2.9%	2.623	6.79	1,450.2/sq mi (559.9/km^{2})
Reddick	Village	Livingston	199	163	+22.1%	0.239	0.62	832.6/sq mi (321.5/km^{2})
Redmon	Village	Edgar	137	173	−20.8%	0.145	0.38	944.8/sq mi (364.8/km^{2})
Reynolds	Village	Rock Island; Mercer	498	539	−7.6%	0.368	0.95	1,353.3/sq mi (522.5/km^{2})
Richmond	Village	McHenry	2,089	1,874	+11.5%	4.290	11.11	486.9/sq mi (188.0/km^{2})
Richton Park	Village	Cook	12,775	13,646	−6.4%	4.392	11.38	2,908.7/sq mi (1,123.1/km^{2})
Richview	Village	Washington	238	253	−5.9%	1.149	2.98	207.1/sq mi (80.0/km^{2})
Ridge Farm	Village	Vermilion	787	882	−10.8%	3.056	7.92	257.5/sq mi (99.4/km^{2})
Ridgway	Village	Gallatin	851	869	−2.1%	0.880	2.28	967.0/sq mi (373.4/km^{2})
Ridott	Village	Stephenson	124	164	−24.4%	0.074	0.19	1,675.7/sq mi (647.0/km^{2})
Ringwood	Village	McHenry	844	836	+1.0%	3.864	10.01	218.4/sq mi (84.3/km^{2})
Rio	Village	Knox	209	220	−5.0%	0.312	0.81	669.9/sq mi (258.6/km^{2})
Ripley	Village	Brown	53	86	−38.4%	0.379	0.98	139.8/sq mi (54.0/km^{2})
Riverdale	Village	Cook	10,663	13,549	−21.3%	3.575	9.26	2,982.7/sq mi (1,151.6/km^{2})
River Forest	Village	Cook	11,717	11,172	+4.9%	2.480	6.42	4,724.6/sq mi (1,824.2/km^{2})
River Grove	Village	Cook	10,612	10,227	+3.8%	2.391	6.19	4,438.3/sq mi (1,713.6/km^{2})
Riverside	Village	Cook	9,298	8,875	+4.8%	1.978	5.12	4,700.7/sq mi (1,815.0/km^{2})
Riverton	Village	Sangamon	3,532	3,455	+2.2%	3.121	8.08	1,131.7/sq mi (436.9/km^{2})
Riverwoods	Village	Lake	3,790	3,660	+3.6%	3.967	10.27	955.4/sq mi (368.9/km^{2})
Roanoke	Village	Woodford	1,960	2,065	−5.1%	0.939	2.43	2,087.3/sq mi (805.9/km^{2})
Robbins	Village	Cook	4,629	5,337	−13.3%	1.449	3.75	3,194.6/sq mi (1,233.4/km^{2})
Roberts	Village	Ford	345	362	−4.7%	0.481	1.25	717.3/sq mi (276.9/km^{2})
Robinson†	City	Crawford	7,150	7,713	−7.3%	4.699	12.17	1,521.6/sq mi (587.5/km^{2})
Rochelle	City	Ogle	9,446	9,574	−1.3%	13.296	34.44	710.4/sq mi (274.3/km^{2})
Rochester	Village	Sangamon	3,863	3,689	+4.7%	2.646	6.85	1,459.9/sq mi (563.7/km^{2})
Rockbridge	Village	Greene	175	169	+3.6%	0.737	1.91	237.4/sq mi (91.7/km^{2})
Rock City	Village	Stephenson	293	315	−7.0%	0.134	0.35	2,186.6/sq mi (844.2/km^{2})
Rockdale	Village	Will	2,012	1,976	+1.8%	1.411	3.65	1,425.9/sq mi (550.6/km^{2})
Rock Falls	City	Whiteside	8,789	9,266	−5.1%	3.983	10.32	2,206.6/sq mi (852.0/km^{2})
Rockford†	City	Winnebago	148,655	152,871	−2.8%	64.544	167.17	2,303.2/sq mi (889.3/km^{2})
Rock Island†	City	Rock Island	37,108	39,018	−4.9%	16.872	43.70	2,199.4/sq mi (849.2/km^{2})
Rockton	Village	Winnebago	7,863	7,685	+2.3%	6.862	17.77	1,145.9/sq mi (442.4/km^{2})
Rockwood	Village	Randolph	32	42	−23.8%	0.212	0.55	150.9/sq mi (58.3/km^{2})
Rolling Meadows	City	Cook	24,200	24,099	+0.4%	5.616	14.55	4,309.1/sq mi (1,663.8/km^{2})
Romeoville	Village	Will	39,863	39,680	+0.5%	19.074	49.40	2,089.9/sq mi (806.9/km^{2})
Roodhouse	City	Greene	1,578	1,814	−13.0%	1.127	2.92	1,400.2/sq mi (540.6/km^{2})
Roscoe	Village	Winnebago	10,983	10,785	+1.8%	10.265	26.59	1,069.9/sq mi (413.1/km^{2})
Rose Hill	Village	Jasper	89	80	+11.3%	0.634	1.64	140.4/sq mi (54.2/km^{2})
Roselle	Village	DuPage; Cook	22,897	22,763	+0.6%	5.537	14.34	4,135.3/sq mi (1,596.6/km^{2})
Rosemont	Village	Cook	3,952	4,202	−5.9%	1.792	4.64	2,205.4/sq mi (851.5/km^{2})
Roseville	Village	Warren	892	989	−9.8%	0.739	1.91	1,207.0/sq mi (466.0/km^{2})
Rosiclare	City	Hardin	980	1,160	−15.5%	1.939	5.02	505.4/sq mi (195.1/km^{2})
Rossville	Village	Vermilion	1,221	1,331	−8.3%	1.398	3.62	873.4/sq mi (337.2/km^{2})
Round Lake	Village	Lake	18,721	18,289	+2.4%	5.557	14.39	3,368.9/sq mi (1,300.7/km^{2})
Round Lake Beach	Village	Lake	27,252	28,175	−3.3%	5.044	13.06	5,402.9/sq mi (2,086.1/km^{2})
Round Lake Heights	Village	Lake	2,622	2,676	−2.0%	0.575	1.49	4,560.0/sq mi (1,760.6/km^{2})
Round Lake Park	Village	Lake	7,680	7,505	+2.3%	2.063	5.34	3,722.7/sq mi (1,437.4/km^{2})
Roxana	Village	Madison	1,454	1,542	−5.7%	7.101	18.39	204.8/sq mi (79.1/km^{2})
Royal	Village	Champaign	293	293	0.0%	0.183	0.47	1,601.1/sq mi (618.2/km^{2})
Royal Lakes	Village	Macoupin	167	197	−15.2%	0.466	1.21	358.4/sq mi (138.4/km^{2})
Royalton	Village	Franklin	1,068	1,151	−7.2%	1.115	2.89	957.8/sq mi (369.8/km^{2})
Ruma	Village	Randolph	313	317	−1.3%	0.742	1.92	421.8/sq mi (162.9/km^{2})
Rushville†	City	Schuyler	3,005	3,192	−5.9%	1.652	4.28	1,819.0/sq mi (702.3/km^{2})
Russellville	Village	Lawrence	98	94	+4.3%	0.400	1.04	245.0/sq mi (94.6/km^{2})
Rutland	Village	LaSalle	259	318	−18.6%	0.694	1.80	373.2/sq mi (144.1/km^{2})
Sadorus	Village	Champaign	402	416	−3.4%	1.027	2.66	391.4/sq mi (151.1/km^{2})
Sailor Springs	Village	Clay	89	95	−6.3%	0.260	0.67	342.3/sq mi (132.2/km^{2})
St. Anne	Village	Kankakee	1,161	1,257	−7.6%	0.830	2.15	1,398.8/sq mi (540.1/km^{2})
St. Augustine	Village	Knox	119	120	−0.8%	0.593	1.54	200.7/sq mi (77.5/km^{2})
St. Charles	City	Kane; DuPage	33,081	32,974	+0.3%	14.401	37.30	2,297.1/sq mi (886.9/km^{2})
St. David	Village	Fulton	522	589	−11.4%	0.299	0.77	1,745.8/sq mi (674.1/km^{2})
St. Elmo	City	Fayette	1,254	1,426	−12.1%	1.483	3.84	845.6/sq mi (326.5/km^{2})
Ste. Marie	Village	Jasper	238	244	−2.5%	1.109	2.87	214.6/sq mi (82.9/km^{2})
St. Francisville	City	Lawrence	568	697	−18.5%	0.745	1.93	762.4/sq mi (294.4/km^{2})
St. Jacob	Village	Madison	1,358	1,098	+23.7%	0.832	2.15	1,632.2/sq mi (630.2/km^{2})
St. Johns	Village	Perry	163	219	−25.6%	0.725	1.88	224.8/sq mi (86.8/km^{2})
St. Joseph	Village	Champaign	3,810	3,967	−4.0%	2.083	5.39	1,829.1/sq mi (706.2/km^{2})
St. Libory	Village	St. Clair	628	615	+2.1%	0.972	2.52	646.1/sq mi (249.5/km^{2})
St. Peter	Village	Fayette	322	359	−10.3%	0.521	1.35	618.0/sq mi (238.6/km^{2})
St. Rose (Note: St. Rose was incorporated on November 8, 2016.)	Village	Clinton	459	-	-	0.591	1.53	776.6/sq mi (299.9/km^{2})
Salem†	City	Marion	7,282	7,485	−2.7%	6.991	18.11	1,041.6/sq mi (402.2/km^{2})
Sammons Point	Village	Kankakee	214	279	−23.3%	1.851	4.79	115.6/sq mi (44.6/km^{2})
Sandoval	Village	Marion	1,157	1,274	−9.2%	0.996	2.58	1,161.6/sq mi (448.5/km^{2})
Sandwich	City	DeKalb; Kendall	7,221	7,421	−2.7%	4.736	12.27	1,524.7/sq mi (588.7/km^{2})
San Jose	Village	Logan; Mason	479	642	−25.4%	0.414	1.07	1,157.0/sq mi (446.7/km^{2})
Sauget	Village	St. Clair	141	159	−11.3%	4.581	11.86	30.8/sq mi (11.9/km^{2})
Sauk Village	Village	Cook	9,921	10,506	−5.6%	3.992	10.34	2,485.2/sq mi (959.5/km^{2})
Saunemin	Village	Livingston	406	420	−3.3%	0.231	0.60	1,757.6/sq mi (678.6/km^{2})
Savanna	City	Carroll	2,783	3,062	−9.1%	2.616	6.78	1,063.8/sq mi (410.8/km^{2})
Savoy	Village	Champaign	8,857	7,280	+21.7%	3.233	8.37	2,739.6/sq mi (1,057.8/km^{2})
Sawyerville	Village	Macoupin	268	279	−3.9%	0.988	2.56	271.3/sq mi (104.7/km^{2})
Saybrook	Village	McLean	654	693	−5.6%	0.802	2.08	815.5/sq mi (314.9/km^{2})
Scales Mound	Village	Jo Daviess	436	376	+16.0%	0.628	1.63	694.3/sq mi (268.1/km^{2})
Schaumburg	Village	Cook	78,723	74,227	+6.1%	19.293	49.97	4,080.4/sq mi (1,575.4/km^{2})
Schiller Park	Village	Cook	11,709	11,793	−0.7%	2.770	7.17	4,227.1/sq mi (1,632.1/km^{2})
Schram City	Village	Montgomery	563	586	−3.9%	0.674	1.75	835.3/sq mi (322.5/km^{2})
Sciota	Village	McDonough	38	61	−37.7%	0.312	0.81	121.8/sq mi (47.0/km^{2})
Scottville	Village	Macoupin	93	116	−19.8%	0.997	2.58	93.3/sq mi (36.0/km^{2})
Seaton	Village	Mercer	214	222	−3.6%	1.579	4.09	135.5/sq mi (52.3/km^{2})
Seatonville	Village	Bureau	321	314	+2.2%	0.496	1.28	647.2/sq mi (249.9/km^{2})
Secor	Village	Woodford	342	373	−8.3%	0.290	0.75	1,179.3/sq mi (455.3/km^{2})
Seneca	Village	LaSalle	2,353	2,371	−0.8%	6.417	16.62	366.7/sq mi (141.6/km^{2})
Sesser	City	Franklin	1,888	1,931	−2.2%	1.030	2.67	1,833.0/sq mi (707.7/km^{2})
Shabbona	Village	DeKalb	863	925	−6.7%	1.283	3.32	672.6/sq mi (259.7/km^{2})
Shannon	Village	Carroll	801	757	+5.8%	0.482	1.25	1,661.8/sq mi (641.6/km^{2})
Shawneetown†	City	Gallatin	1,054	1,239	−14.9%	0.734	1.90	1,436.0/sq mi (554.4/km^{2})
Sheffield	Village	Bureau	821	926	−11.3%	1.169	3.03	702.3/sq mi (271.2/km^{2})
Shelbyville†	City	Shelby	4,674	4,700	−0.6%	4.076	10.56	1,146.7/sq mi (442.7/km^{2})
Sheldon	Village	Iroquois	965	1,070	−9.8%	0.753	1.95	1,281.5/sq mi (494.8/km^{2})
Sheridan	Village	LaSalle	2,431	2,137	+13.8%	2.121	5.49	1,146.2/sq mi (442.5/km^{2})
Sherman	Village	Sangamon	4,673	4,148	+12.7%	3.127	8.10	1,494.4/sq mi (577.0/km^{2})
Sherrard	Village	Mercer	692	640	+8.1%	0.928	2.40	745.7/sq mi (287.9/km^{2})
Shiloh	Village	St. Clair	14,098	12,651	+11.4%	11.032	28.57	1,277.9/sq mi (493.4/km^{2})
Shipman	Town	Macoupin	511	624	−18.1%	1.320	3.42	387.1/sq mi (149.5/km^{2})
Shorewood	Village	Will	18,186	15,615	+16.5%	8.069	20.90	2,253.8/sq mi (870.2/km^{2})
Shumway	Village	Effingham	188	202	−6.9%	0.332	0.86	566.3/sq mi (218.6/km^{2})
Sibley	Village	Ford	288	272	+5.9%	0.481	1.25	598.8/sq mi (231.2/km^{2})
Sidell	Village	Vermilion	489	617	−20.7%	0.927	2.40	527.5/sq mi (203.7/km^{2})
Sidney	Village	Champaign	1,208	1,233	−2.0%	0.624	1.62	1,935.9/sq mi (747.5/km^{2})
Sigel	Town	Shelby	329	373	−11.8%	0.281	0.73	1,170.8/sq mi (452.1/km^{2})
Silvis	City	Rock Island	8,003	7,479	+7.0%	4.285	11.10	1,867.7/sq mi (721.1/km^{2})
Simpson	Village	Johnson	44	60	−26.7%	0.525	1.36	83.8/sq mi (32.4/km^{2})
Sims	Village	Wayne	166	252	−34.1%	1.182	3.06	140.4/sq mi (54.2/km^{2})
Skokie	Village	Cook	67,824	64,784	+4.7%	10.064	26.07	6,739.3/sq mi (2,602.0/km^{2})
Sleepy Hollow	Village	Kane	3,214	3,304	−2.7%	2.019	5.23	1,591.9/sq mi (614.6/km^{2})
Smithboro	Village	Bond	154	177	−13.0%	0.932	2.41	165.2/sq mi (63.8/km^{2})
Smithfield	Village	Fulton	191	230	−17.0%	0.465	1.20	410.8/sq mi (158.6/km^{2})
Smithton	Village	St. Clair	4,006	3,693	+8.5%	4.435	11.49	903.3/sq mi (348.8/km^{2})
Somonauk	Village	DeKalb; LaSalle	1,786	1,893	−5.7%	2.488	6.44	717.8/sq mi (277.2/km^{2})
Sorento	Village	Bond	429	498	−13.9%	0.798	2.07	537.6/sq mi (207.6/km^{2})
South Barrington	Village	Cook	5,077	4,565	+11.2%	7.427	19.24	683.6/sq mi (263.9/km^{2})
South Beloit	City	Winnebago	7,989	7,892	+1.2%	6.144	15.91	1,300.3/sq mi (502.0/km^{2})
South Chicago Heights	Village	Cook	4,026	4,139	−2.7%	1.581	4.09	2,546.5/sq mi (983.2/km^{2})
South Elgin	Village	Kane	23,865	21,985	+8.6%	7.060	18.29	3,380.3/sq mi (1,305.1/km^{2})
Southern View	Village	Sangamon	1,596	1,642	−2.8%	0.647	1.68	2,466.8/sq mi (952.4/km^{2})
South Holland	Village	Cook	21,465	22,030	−2.6%	7.236	18.74	2,966.4/sq mi (1,145.3/km^{2})
South Jacksonville	Village	Morgan	3,302	3,331	−0.9%	2.273	5.89	1,452.7/sq mi (560.9/km^{2})
South Pekin	Village	Tazewell	996	1,146	−13.1%	0.515	1.33	1,934.0/sq mi (746.7/km^{2})
South Roxana	Village	Madison	1,891	2,053	−7.9%	2.158	5.59	876.3/sq mi (338.3/km^{2})
South Wilmington	Village	Grundy	710	681	+4.3%	0.492	1.27	1,443.1/sq mi (557.2/km^{2})
Sparland	Village	Marshall	366	406	−9.9%	0.572	1.48	639.9/sq mi (247.1/km^{2})
Sparta	City	Randolph	4,095	4,302	−4.8%	11.170	28.93	366.6/sq mi (141.5/km^{2})
Spaulding	Village	Sangamon	801	873	−8.2%	0.750	1.94	1,068.0/sq mi (412.4/km^{2})
Spillertown	Village	Williamson	181	203	−10.8%	0.321	0.83	563.9/sq mi (217.7/km^{2})
Spring Bay	Village	Woodford	474	452	+4.9%	0.683	1.77	694.0/sq mi (268.0/km^{2})
Springerton	Village	White	101	110	−8.2%	0.126	0.33	801.6/sq mi (309.5/km^{2})
Springfield‡† (Note: Springfield is also the seat of Sangamon County.)	City	Sangamon	114,394	116,250	−1.6%	61.138	158.35	1,871.1/sq mi (722.4/km^{2})
Spring Grove	Village	McHenry	5,487	5,778	−5.0%	9.046	23.43	606.6/sq mi (234.2/km^{2})
Spring Valley	City	Bureau	5,582	5,558	+0.4%	7.356	19.05	758.8/sq mi (293.0/km^{2})
Standard	Village	Putnam	225	220	+2.3%	0.711	1.84	316.5/sq mi (122.2/km^{2})
Standard City	Village	Macoupin	135	152	−11.2%	0.636	1.65	212.3/sq mi (82.0/km^{2})
Stanford	Village	McLean	600	596	+0.7%	0.662	1.71	906.3/sq mi (349.9/km^{2})
Staunton	City	Macoupin	5,054	5,139	−1.7%	3.974	10.29	1,271.8/sq mi (491.0/km^{2})
Steeleville	Village	Randolph	1,930	2,083	−7.3%	1.523	3.94	1,267.2/sq mi (489.3/km^{2})
Steger	Village	Cook; Will	9,584	9,570	+0.1%	3.404	8.82	2,815.5/sq mi (1,087.1/km^{2})
Sterling	City	Whiteside	14,764	15,370	−3.9%	5.791	15.00	2,549.5/sq mi (984.4/km^{2})
Steward	Village	Lee	229	256	−10.5%	0.269	0.70	851.3/sq mi (328.7/km^{2})
Stewardson	Village	Shelby	721	734	−1.8%	0.610	1.58	1,182.0/sq mi (456.4/km^{2})
Stickney	Village	Cook	7,110	6,786	+4.8%	1.924	4.98	3,695.4/sq mi (1,426.8/km^{2})
Stillman Valley	Village	Ogle	1,075	1,120	−4.0%	0.570	1.48	1,886.0/sq mi (728.2/km^{2})
Stockton	Village	Jo Daviess	1,728	1,862	−7.2%	1.877	4.86	920.6/sq mi (355.5/km^{2})
Stonefort	Village	Williamson; Saline	224	297	−24.6%	1.454	3.77	154.1/sq mi (59.5/km^{2})
Stone Park	Village	Cook	4,576	4,946	−7.5%	0.344	0.89	13,302.3/sq mi (5,136.1/km^{2})
Stonington	Village	Christian	837	932	−10.2%	0.457	1.18	1,831.5/sq mi (707.1/km^{2})
Stoy	Village	Crawford	108	104	+3.8%	0.932	2.41	115.9/sq mi (44.7/km^{2})
Strasburg	Village	Shelby	531	467	+13.7%	0.541	1.40	981.5/sq mi (379.0/km^{2})
Strawn	Village	Livingston	101	100	+1.0%	0.510	1.32	198.0/sq mi (76.5/km^{2})
Streamwood	Village	Cook	39,577	39,858	−0.7%	7.798	20.20	5,075.3/sq mi (1,959.6/km^{2})
Streator	City	LaSalle; Livingston	12,500	13,710	−8.8%	7.293	18.89	1,714.0/sq mi (661.8/km^{2})
Stronghurst	Village	Henderson	833	883	−5.7%	0.873	2.26	954.2/sq mi (368.4/km^{2})
Sublette	Village	Lee	380	449	−15.4%	0.321	0.83	1,183.8/sq mi (457.1/km^{2})
Sugar Grove	Village	Kane	9,278	8,997	+3.1%	11.748	30.43	789.8/sq mi (304.9/km^{2})
Sullivan†	City	Moultrie	4,413	4,440	−0.6%	2.769	7.17	1,593.7/sq mi (615.3/km^{2})
Summerfield	Village	St. Clair	347	451	−23.1%	0.495	1.28	701.0/sq mi (270.7/km^{2})
Summit	Village	Cook	11,161	11,054	+1.0%	2.119	5.49	5,267.1/sq mi (2,033.6/km^{2})
Sumner	City	Lawrence	2,631	3,174	−17.1%	1.398	3.62	1,882.0/sq mi (726.6/km^{2})
Sun River Terrace	Village	Kankakee	455	528	−13.8%	0.573	1.48	794.1/sq mi (306.6/km^{2})
Swansea	Village	St. Clair	14,386	13,430	+7.1%	6.477	16.78	2,221.1/sq mi (857.6/km^{2})
Sycamore†	City	DeKalb	18,577	17,519	+6.0%	10.120	26.21	1,835.7/sq mi (708.8/km^{2})
Symerton	Village	Will	128	87	+47.1%	0.157	0.41	815.3/sq mi (314.8/km^{2})
Table Grove	Village	Fulton	353	416	−15.1%	0.282	0.73	1,251.8/sq mi (483.3/km^{2})
Tallula	Village	Menard	434	488	−11.1%	0.531	1.38	817.3/sq mi (315.6/km^{2})
Tamaroa	Village	Perry	544	638	−14.7%	0.958	2.48	567.8/sq mi (219.2/km^{2})
Tamms	Village	Alexander	430	632	−32.0%	2.332	6.04	184.4/sq mi (71.2/km^{2})
Tampico	Village	Whiteside	689	790	−12.8%	0.394	1.02	1,748.7/sq mi (675.2/km^{2})
Taylor Springs	Village	Montgomery	724	690	+4.9%	1.050	2.72	689.5/sq mi (266.2/km^{2})
Taylorville†	City	Christian	10,506	11,246	−6.6%	10.315	26.72	1,018.5/sq mi (393.3/km^{2})
Tennessee	Village	McDonough	101	115	−12.2%	0.425	1.10	237.6/sq mi (91.8/km^{2})
Teutopolis	Village	Effingham	1,618	1,530	+5.8%	2.043	5.29	792.0/sq mi (305.8/km^{2})
Thawville	Village	Iroquois	215	241	−10.8%	0.307	0.80	700.3/sq mi (270.4/km^{2})
Thayer	Village	Sangamon	632	693	−8.8%	0.610	1.58	1,036.1/sq mi (400.0/km^{2})
Thebes	Village	Alexander	208	436	−52.3%	1.745	4.52	119.2/sq mi (46.0/km^{2})
Third Lake	Village	Lake	1,111	1,182	−6.0%	0.586	1.52	1,895.9/sq mi (732.0/km^{2})
Thomasboro	Village	Champaign	1,034	1,126	−8.2%	0.995	2.58	1,039.2/sq mi (401.2/km^{2})
Thompsonville	Village	Franklin	486	543	−10.5%	2.031	5.26	239.3/sq mi (92.4/km^{2})
Thomson	Village	Carroll	1,610	590	+172.9%	2.219	5.75	725.6/sq mi (280.1/km^{2})
Thornton	Village	Cook	2,386	2,338	+2.1%	2.375	6.15	1,004.6/sq mi (387.9/km^{2})
Tilden	Village	Randolph	750	934	−19.7%	0.975	2.53	769.2/sq mi (297.0/km^{2})
Tilton	Village	Vermilion	2,660	2,724	−2.3%	3.788	9.81	702.2/sq mi (271.1/km^{2})
Timberlane	Village	Boone	906	934	−3.0%	1.746	4.52	518.9/sq mi (200.3/km^{2})
Time	Village	Pike	26	23	+13.0%	0.254	0.66	102.4/sq mi (39.5/km^{2})
Tinley Park	Village	Cook; Will	55,971	56,703	−1.3%	16.096	41.69	3,477.3/sq mi (1,342.6/km^{2})
Tiskilwa	Village	Bureau	740	829	−10.7%	0.517	1.34	1,431.3/sq mi (552.6/km^{2})
Toledo†	Village	Cumberland	1,161	1,238	−6.2%	0.888	2.30	1,307.4/sq mi (504.8/km^{2})
Tolono	Village	Champaign	3,604	3,447	+4.6%	2.061	5.34	1,748.7/sq mi (675.2/km^{2})
Toluca	City	Marshall	1,340	1,414	−5.2%	1.062	2.75	1,261.8/sq mi (487.2/km^{2})
Tonica	Village	LaSalle	749	768	−2.5%	1.363	3.53	549.5/sq mi (212.2/km^{2})
Topeka	Village	Mason	60	76	−21.1%	0.137	0.35	438.0/sq mi (169.1/km^{2})
Toulon†	City	Stark	1,193	1,292	−7.7%	1.017	2.63	1,173.1/sq mi (452.9/km^{2})
Tovey	Village	Christian	464	512	−9.4%	0.223	0.58	2,080.7/sq mi (803.4/km^{2})
Towanda	Village	McLean	431	480	−10.2%	0.744	1.93	579.3/sq mi (223.7/km^{2})
Tower Hill	Village	Shelby	485	611	−20.6%	1.005	2.60	482.6/sq mi (186.3/km^{2})
Tower Lakes	Village	Lake	1,226	1,283	−4.4%	0.919	2.38	1,334.1/sq mi (515.1/km^{2})
Tremont	Village	Tazewell	2,277	2,236	+1.8%	1.120	2.90	2,033.0/sq mi (785.0/km^{2})
Trenton	City	Clinton	2,690	2,715	−0.9%	1.880	4.87	1,430.9/sq mi (552.5/km^{2})
Trout Valley	Village	McHenry	515	537	−4.1%	0.428	1.11	1,203.3/sq mi (464.6/km^{2})
Troy	City	Madison	10,960	9,888	+10.8%	5.620	14.56	1,950.2/sq mi (753.0/km^{2})
Troy Grove	Village	LaSalle	225	250	−10.0%	0.687	1.78	327.5/sq mi (126.5/km^{2})
Tuscola†	City	Douglas	4,636	4,480	+3.5%	2.878	7.45	1,610.8/sq mi (621.9/km^{2})
Ullin	Village	Pulaski	466	463	+0.6%	2.811	7.28	165.8/sq mi (64.0/km^{2})
Union	Village	McHenry	551	580	−5.0%	0.836	2.17	659.1/sq mi (254.5/km^{2})
Union Hill	Village	Kankakee	55	58	−5.2%	0.046	0.12	1,195.7/sq mi (461.6/km^{2})
University Park	Village	Cook	7,145	7,129	+0.2%	10.727	27.78	666.1/sq mi (257.2/km^{2})
Urbana†	City	Champaign	38,336	41,250	−7.1%	11.830	30.64	3,240.6/sq mi (1,251.2/km^{2})
Ursa	Village	Adams	609	626	−2.7%	0.690	1.79	882.6/sq mi (340.8/km^{2})
Valier	Village	Franklin	554	669	−17.2%	1.124	2.91	492.9/sq mi (190.3/km^{2})
Valley City	Village	Pike	14	13	+7.7%	0.270	0.70	51.9/sq mi (20.0/km^{2})
Valmeyer	Village	Monroe	1,233	1,263	−2.4%	3.417	8.85	360.8/sq mi (139.3/km^{2})
Vandalia†	City	Fayette	7,458	7,042	+5.9%	8.147	21.10	915.4/sq mi (353.4/km^{2})
Varna	Village	Marshall	375	384	−2.3%	0.297	0.77	1,262.6/sq mi (487.5/km^{2})
Venedy	Village	Washington	121	138	−12.3%	0.281	0.73	430.6/sq mi (166.3/km^{2})
Venice	City	Madison	1,498	1,890	−20.7%	1.849	4.79	810.2/sq mi (312.8/km^{2})
Vergennes	Village	Jackson	235	298	−21.1%	0.352	0.91	667.6/sq mi (257.8/km^{2})
Vermilion	Village	Edgar	203	225	−9.8%	0.546	1.41	371.8/sq mi (143.6/km^{2})
Vermont	Village	Fulton	570	667	−14.5%	1.258	3.26	453.1/sq mi (174.9/km^{2})
Vernon	Village	Marion	103	129	−20.2%	0.882	2.28	116.8/sq mi (45.1/km^{2})
Vernon Hills	Village	Lake	26,850	25,113	+6.9%	7.741	20.05	3,468.5/sq mi (1,339.2/km^{2})
Verona	Village	Grundy	208	215	−3.3%	0.165	0.43	1,260.6/sq mi (486.7/km^{2})
Versailles	Village	Brown	446	478	−6.7%	0.933	2.42	478.0/sq mi (184.6/km^{2})
Victoria	Village	Knox	268	316	−15.2%	0.451	1.17	594.2/sq mi (229.4/km^{2})
Vienna†	City	Johnson	1,343	1,434	−6.3%	2.837	7.35	473.4/sq mi (182.8/km^{2})
Villa Grove	City	Douglas	2,472	2,537	−2.6%	1.502	3.89	1,645.8/sq mi (635.4/km^{2})
Villa Park	Village	DuPage	22,263	21,904	+1.6%	4.723	12.23	4,713.7/sq mi (1,820.0/km^{2})
Viola	Village	Mercer	869	955	−9.0%	0.838	2.17	1,037.0/sq mi (400.4/km^{2})
Virden	City	Macoupin; Sangamon	3,231	3,425	−5.7%	1.889	4.89	1,710.4/sq mi (660.4/km^{2})
Virgil	Village	Kane	289	329	−12.2%	2.183	5.65	132.4/sq mi (51.1/km^{2})
Virginia†	City	Cass	1,514	1,611	−6.0%	1.207	3.13	1,254.3/sq mi (484.3/km^{2})
Volo	Village	Lake	6,122	2,929	+109.0%	3.915	10.14	1,563.7/sq mi (603.8/km^{2})
Wadsworth	Village	Lake	3,517	3,815	−7.8%	9.857	25.53	356.8/sq mi (137.8/km^{2})
Waggoner	Village	Montgomery	181	266	−32.0%	0.244	0.63	741.8/sq mi (286.4/km^{2})
Walnut	Village	Bureau	1,311	1,416	−7.4%	0.801	2.07	1,636.7/sq mi (631.9/km^{2})
Walnut Hill	Village	Marion	95	108	−12.0%	0.380	0.98	250.0/sq mi (96.5/km^{2})
Walshville	Village	Montgomery	61	64	−4.7%	0.257	0.67	237.4/sq mi (91.6/km^{2})
Waltonville	Village	Jefferson	408	434	−6.0%	1.240	3.21	329.0/sq mi (127.0/km^{2})
Wamac	City	Clinton; Marion; Washington	985	1,185	−16.9%	1.405	3.64	701.1/sq mi (270.7/km^{2})
Wapella	Village	De Witt	513	558	−8.1%	0.551	1.43	931.0/sq mi (359.5/km^{2})
Warren	Village	Jo Daviess	1,323	1,428	−7.4%	1.033	2.68	1,280.7/sq mi (494.5/km^{2})
Warrensburg	Village	Macon	1,110	1,210	−8.3%	0.728	1.89	1,524.7/sq mi (588.7/km^{2})
Warrenville	City	DuPage	13,553	13,140	+3.1%	5.460	14.14	2,482.2/sq mi (958.4/km^{2})
Warsaw	City	Hancock	1,510	1,607	−6.0%	6.520	16.89	231.6/sq mi (89.4/km^{2})
Washburn	Village	Woodford; Marshall	1,032	1,155	−10.6%	0.720	1.86	1,433.3/sq mi (553.4/km^{2})
Washington	City	Tazewell	16,071	15,134	+6.2%	8.541	22.12	1,881.6/sq mi (726.5/km^{2})
Washington Park	Village	St. Clair	2,592	4,196	−38.2%	2.521	6.53	1,028.2/sq mi (397.0/km^{2})
Wataga	Village	Knox	744	843	−11.7%	0.829	2.15	897.5/sq mi (346.5/km^{2})
Waterloo†	City	Monroe	11,013	9,811	+12.3%	8.132	21.06	1,354.3/sq mi (522.9/km^{2})
Waterman	Village	DeKalb	1,433	1,506	−4.8%	1.451	3.76	987.6/sq mi (381.3/km^{2})
Watseka†	City	Iroquois	4,679	5,255	−11.0%	2.944	7.62	1,589.3/sq mi (613.6/km^{2})
Watson	Village	Effingham	668	754	−11.4%	1.092	2.83	611.7/sq mi (236.2/km^{2})
Wauconda	Village	Lake	14,084	13,603	+3.5%	5.072	13.14	2,776.8/sq mi (1,072.1/km^{2})
Waukegan†	City	Lake	89,321	89,078	+0.3%	24.225	62.74	3,687.1/sq mi (1,423.6/km^{2})
Waverly	City	Morgan	1,194	1,307	−8.6%	1.036	2.68	1,152.5/sq mi (445.0/km^{2})
Wayne	Village	DuPage; Kane	2,286	2,431	−6.0%	5.730	14.84	399.0/sq mi (154.0/km^{2})
Wayne City	Village	Wayne	994	1,032	−3.7%	1.722	4.46	577.2/sq mi (222.9/km^{2})
Waynesville	Village	De Witt	381	434	−12.2%	0.319	0.83	1,194.4/sq mi (461.1/km^{2})
Weldon	Village	De Witt	369	429	−14.0%	0.267	0.69	1,382.0/sq mi (533.6/km^{2})
Wellington	Village	Iroquois	206	242	−14.9%	0.238	0.62	865.5/sq mi (334.2/km^{2})
Wenona	City	Marshall	974	1,056	−7.8%	0.736	1.91	1,323.4/sq mi (511.0/km^{2})
Wenonah	Village	Montgomery	32	37	−13.5%	1.514	3.92	21.1/sq mi (8.2/km^{2})
West Brooklyn	Village	Lee	131	142	−7.7%	0.085	0.22	1,541.2/sq mi (595.1/km^{2})
Westchester	Village	Cook	16,892	16,718	+1.0%	3.686	9.55	4,582.7/sq mi (1,769.4/km^{2})
West Chicago	City	DuPage	25,614	27,086	−5.4%	15.376	39.82	1,665.8/sq mi (643.2/km^{2})
West City	Village	Franklin	656	661	−0.8%	1.608	4.16	408.0/sq mi (157.5/km^{2})
West Dundee	Village	Kane	7,686	7,331	+4.8%	3.637	9.42	2,113.3/sq mi (815.9/km^{2})
Western Springs	Village	Cook	13,629	12,975	+5.0%	2.785	7.21	4,893.7/sq mi (1,889.5/km^{2})
Westfield	Village	Clark	536	601	−10.8%	0.978	2.53	548.1/sq mi (211.6/km^{2})
West Frankfort	City	Franklin	7,275	8,182	−11.1%	4.980	12.90	1,460.8/sq mi (564.0/km^{2})
Westmont	Village	DuPage	24,429	24,685	−1.0%	5.004	12.96	4,881.9/sq mi (1,884.9/km^{2})
West Peoria	City	Peoria	4,263	4,458	−4.4%	2.106	5.45	2,024.2/sq mi (781.6/km^{2})
West Point	Village	Hancock	140	178	−21.3%	0.168	0.44	833.3/sq mi (321.8/km^{2})
West Salem	Village	Edwards	786	897	−12.4%	1.560	4.04	503.8/sq mi (194.5/km^{2})
Westville	Village	Vermilion	3,167	3,202	−1.1%	1.678	4.35	1,887.4/sq mi (728.7/km^{2})
Wheaton†	City	DuPage	53,970	52,894	+2.0%	11.319	29.32	4,768.1/sq mi (1,841.0/km^{2})
Wheeler	Village	Jasper	96	147	−34.7%	0.576	1.49	166.7/sq mi (64.4/km^{2})
Wheeling	Village	Cook	39,137	37,648	+4.0%	8.672	22.46	4,513.0/sq mi (1,742.5/km^{2})
White City	Village	Macoupin	212	232	−8.6%	1.212	3.14	174.9/sq mi (67.5/km^{2})
White Hall	City	Greene	2,295	2,520	−8.9%	2.577	6.67	890.6/sq mi (343.9/km^{2})
Williamsfield	Village	Knox	575	578	−0.5%	1.231	3.19	467.1/sq mi (180.3/km^{2})
Williamson	Village	Madison	183	230	−20.4%	1.171	3.03	156.3/sq mi (60.3/km^{2})
Williamsville	Village	Sangamon	1,425	1,476	−3.5%	1.548	4.01	920.5/sq mi (355.4/km^{2})
Willisville	Village	Perry	579	633	−8.5%	0.389	1.01	1,488.4/sq mi (574.7/km^{2})
Willowbrook	Village	DuPage	9,236	8,540	+8.1%	2.572	6.66	3,591.0/sq mi (1,386.5/km^{2})
Willow Hill	Village	Jasper	172	230	−25.2%	1.039	2.69	165.5/sq mi (63.9/km^{2})
Willow Springs	Village	Cook	5,857	5,524	+6.0%	4.155	10.76	1,409.6/sq mi (544.3/km^{2})
Wilmette	Village	Cook	28,170	27,087	+4.0%	5.403	13.99	5,213.8/sq mi (2,013.0/km^{2})
Wilmington	Village	Greene	91	142	−35.9%	0.786	2.04	115.8/sq mi (44.7/km^{2})
Wilmington	City	Will	5,664	5,724	−1.0%	13.803	35.75	410.3/sq mi (158.4/km^{2})
Wilsonville	Village	Macoupin	536	586	−8.5%	0.956	2.48	560.7/sq mi (216.5/km^{2})
Winchester†	City	Scott	1,574	1,593	−1.2%	1.129	2.92	1,394.2/sq mi (538.3/km^{2})
Windsor	Village	Mercer	668	748	−10.7%	0.438	1.13	1,525.1/sq mi (588.8/km^{2})
Windsor, Shelby County, Illinois	City	Shelby	1,079	1,187	−9.1%	0.630	1.63	1,712.7/sq mi (661.3/km^{2})
Winfield	Village	DuPage	9,835	9,080	+8.3%	3.090	8.00	3,182.8/sq mi (1,228.9/km^{2})
Winnebago	Village	Winnebago	2,940	3,101	−5.2%	1.934	5.01	1,520.2/sq mi (586.9/km^{2})
Winnetka	Village	Cook	12,744	12,187	+4.6%	3.811	9.87	3,344.0/sq mi (1,291.1/km^{2})
Winslow	Village	Stephenson	281	338	−16.9%	0.458	1.19	613.5/sq mi (236.9/km^{2})
Winthrop Harbor	Village	Lake	6,705	6,742	−0.5%	4.637	12.01	1,446.0/sq mi (558.3/km^{2})
Witt	City	Montgomery	785	903	−13.1%	1.237	3.20	634.6/sq mi (245.0/km^{2})
Wonder Lake	Village	McHenry	3,973	4,026	−1.3%	4.964	12.86	800.4/sq mi (309.0/km^{2})
Wood Dale	City	DuPage	14,012	13,770	+1.8%	4.783	12.39	2,929.5/sq mi (1,131.1/km^{2})
Woodhull	Village	Henry	754	811	−7.0%	0.882	2.28	854.9/sq mi (330.1/km^{2})
Woodland	Village	Iroquois	248	324	−23.5%	0.490	1.27	506.1/sq mi (195.4/km^{2})
Woodlawn	Village	Jefferson	617	698	−11.6%	0.852	2.21	724.2/sq mi (279.6/km^{2})
Woodridge	Village	DuPage	34,158	32,971	+3.6%	9.645	24.98	3,541.5/sq mi (1,367.4/km^{2})
Wood River	City	Madison	10,464	10,657	−1.8%	6.975	18.07	1,500.2/sq mi (579.2/km^{2})
Woodson	Village	Morgan	498	512	−2.7%	0.394	1.02	1,264.0/sq mi (488.0/km^{2})
Woodstock†	City	McHenry	25,630	24,770	+3.5%	13.187	34.15	1,943.6/sq mi (750.4/km^{2})
Worden	Village	Madison	1,096	1,044	+5.0%	0.713	1.85	1,537.2/sq mi (593.5/km^{2})
Worth	Village	Cook	10,970	10,789	+1.7%	2.369	6.14	4,630.6/sq mi (1,787.9/km^{2})
Wyanet	Village	Bureau	886	991	−10.6%	0.946	2.45	936.6/sq mi (361.6/km^{2})
Wyoming	City	Stark	1,300	1,429	−9.0%	0.854	2.21	1,522.2/sq mi (587.7/km^{2})
Xenia	Village	Clay	380	391	−2.8%	0.493	1.28	770.8/sq mi (297.6/km^{2})
Yale	Village	Jasper	67	86	−22.1%	0.575	1.49	116.5/sq mi (45.0/km^{2})
Yates City	Village	Knox	642	693	−7.4%	0.493	1.28	1,302.2/sq mi (502.8/km^{2})
Yorkville†	City	Kendall	21,533	16,921	+27.3%	19.997	51.79	1,076.8/sq mi (415.8/km^{2})
Zeigler	City	Franklin	1,484	1,801	−17.6%	1.359	3.52	1,092.0/sq mi (421.6/km^{2})
Zion	City	Lake	24,655	24,413	+1.0%	9.904	25.65	2,489.4/sq mi (961.2/km^{2})
Total municipalities	—	—	11,170,271	11,127,961	+0.4%	4,873.41	12,624.2	2,291.7/sq mi (884.8/km^{2})
Illinois	—	—	12,812,508	12,830,632	−0.1%	55,499.0	143,742	230.9/sq mi (89.1/km^{2})

== See also ==
- List of census-designated places in Illinois
- List of unincorporated communities in Illinois
- Administrative divisions of Illinois
- List of Illinois townships
- List of counties in Illinois
- List of precincts in Illinois
- List of ghost towns in Illinois
- List of city nicknames in Illinois
- Illinois census statistical areas
