= Big Sandy Creek (Illinois) =

Physical characteristics
- Source
  - location: Morgan County southeast of Jacksonville, Illinois
  - coordinates: 39°37′54″N 90°10′16″W
- Mouth
  - location: Confluence with the Illinois River, Scott County, Illinois
  - coordinates: 39°33′04″N 90°34′23″W
  - elevation: 423 ft (129 m)

Basin features
- GNIS ID: 417992

Little Sandy Creek

Physical characteristics
- Source
  - location: Scott County west of Manchester, Illinois
  - coordinates: 39°32′04″N 90°20′32″W
- Mouth
  - location: Confluence with Big Sandy Creek approx. 1/3 mile above the Illinois River
  - coordinates: 39°33′07″N 90°34′01″W
  - elevation: 423 ft (129 m)

Basin features
- GNIS ID: 412409

Big Sandy Creek, often called the Big Branch, is a tributary of the Illinois River in central Illinois. It drains a large portion of southwestern Morgan County and southern Scott County. The drainage of Big Sandy Creek includes Lake Jacksonville and the county seat of Scott County, Winchester, Illinois.

Most of the Big Sandy Creek drainage is intensely farmed arable land. Because the land is sandy, nitrogen runoff due to fertilizer application is significant. In addition, Jacksonville and Winchester drain their sewage into the creek.

Little Sandy Creek is a tributary of Big Sandy Creek. The two streams combine shortly before discharging into the Illinois River opposite the hamlet of Montezuma, Illinois. Sand discharged by the alluvial creeks may have helped form McEvers Island, a silt island in the Illinois River just below the mouth of the creek.
