= Jacksonville micropolitan area, Illinois =

Coordinates: 39°40′N 90°20′W

Jacksonville Micropolitan Area Jacksonville, IL Micropolitan Statistical Area
- Micropolitan Statistical Area
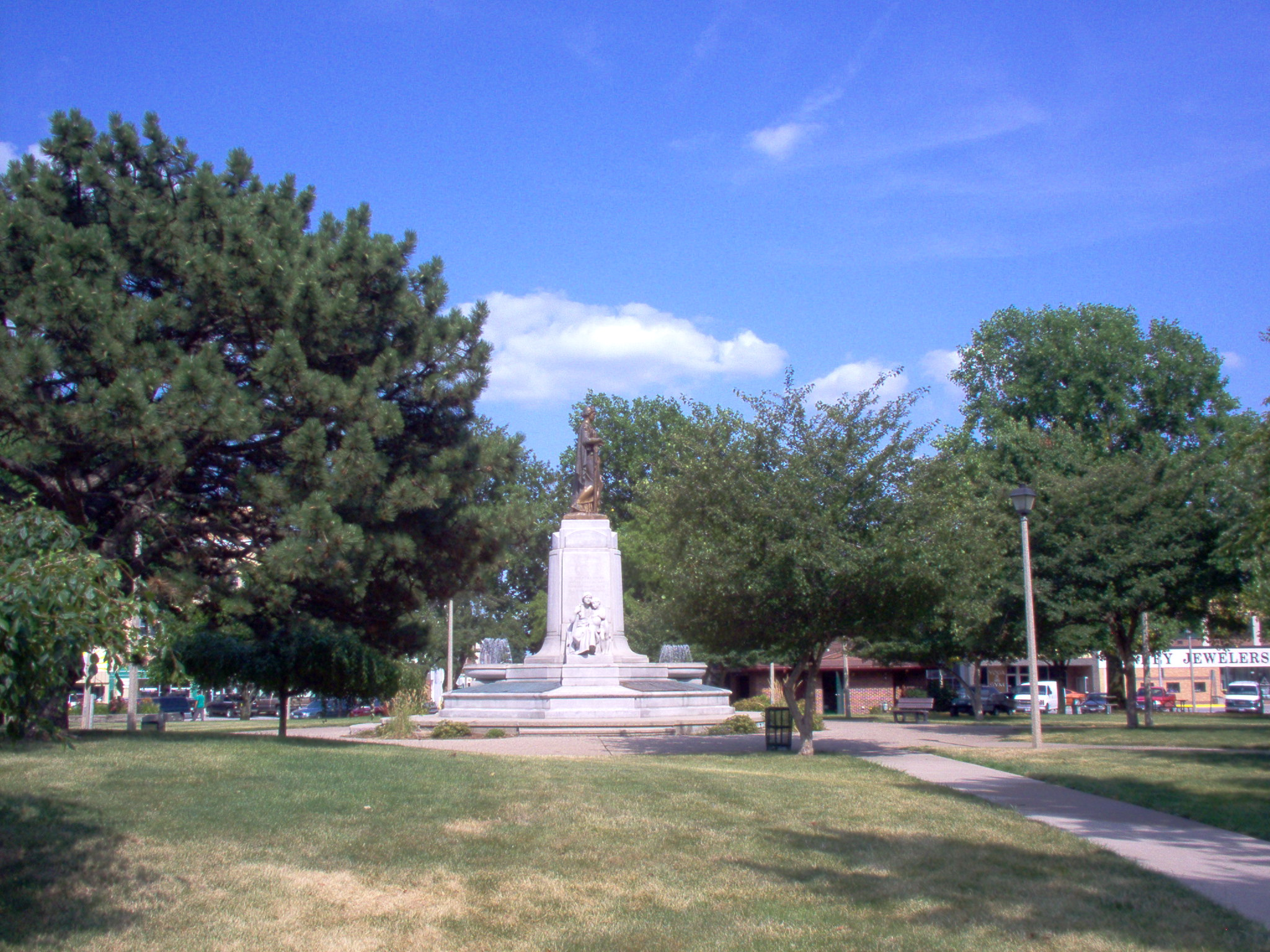
- Civil War monument in Central Park
Springfield–Jacksonville–Lincoln, IL CSA
City of Springfield
Springfield, IL MSA
Jacksonville, IL µSA
Taylorville, IL µSA
Lincoln, IL µSA
- Country: United States
- State: Illinois
- Time zone: UTC−6 (CST)
  - Summer (DST): UTC−5 (CDT)

The Jacksonville, IL Micropolitan Statistical Area, as defined by the United States Census Bureau, is an area consisting of two counties in west central Illinois, anchored by the city of Jacksonville.

As of the 2000 census, the μSA had a population of 42,153 (though a July 1, 2009 estimate placed the population at 40,090).

== Counties ==
- Morgan
- Scott

== Communities ==
- Places with more than 10,000 inhabitants
  - Jacksonville (Principal city)
- Places with 1,000 to 5,000 inhabitants
  - Meredosia
  - South Jacksonville
  - Waverly
  - Winchester
- Places with 500 to 1,000 inhabitants
  - Bluffs
  - Chapin
  - Franklin
  - Murrayville
  - Woodson
- Places with less than 500 inhabitants
  - Alsey
  - Concord
  - Exeter
  - Glasgow
  - Lynnville
  - Manchester
  - Naples
- Unincorporated places
  - Alexander
  - Arcadia
  - Arnold
  - Clements
  - Literberry
  - Merritt
  - Nortonville
  - Pisgah
  - Rees
  - Riggston
  - Sinclair
  - Sweet Water

== Demographics ==
As of the census of 2000, there were 42,153 people, 16,261 households, and 10,813 families residing within the μSA. The racial makeup of the μSA was 93.27% White, 4.66% African American, 0.18% Native American, 0.42% Asian, 0.01% Pacific Islander, 0.61% from other races, and 0.85% from two or more races. Hispanic or Latino of any race were 1.20% of the population.

The median income for a household in the μSA was $36,750, and the median income for a family was $44,482. Males had a median income of $30,659 versus $22,280 for females. The per capita income for the μSA was $17,602.

== See also ==
- Illinois statistical areas
- Micropolitan statistical area
