= Oxville, Illinois =

- Unincorporated community
- Location within Illinois Location within the United States
- Coordinates: 39°42′19″N 90°33′37″W
- Country: United States
- State: Illinois
- County: Scott

Area
  - Total: 0.035 sq mi (0.09 km^{2})
  - Land: 0.035 sq mi (0.09 km^{2})
  - Water: 0 sq mi (0.00 km^{2})
- Elevation: 472 ft (144 m)

Population (2020)
  - Total: 24
  - Density: 705.1/sq mi (272.23/km^{2})
- Time zone: UTC-6 (Central (CST))
  - Summer (DST): UTC-5 (CDT)
- Area code: 217
- GNIS feature ID: 2804099

Oxville is an unincorporated community in Scott County, Illinois, United States. Oxville is located near Illinois Route 100 3.5 miles (5.6 km) south-southwest of Bluffs.

As of the 2020 census, Oxville had a population of 24.

== Demographics ==
Historical population
| Census | Pop. | Note | %± |
|---|---|---|---|
| 2020 | 24 | | — |
U.S. Decennial Census

Oxville first appeared as a census designated place in the 2020 U.S. census.
