= Winchester Historic District (Winchester, Illinois) =

Historic district in Illinois, United States

- U.S. National Register of Historic Places
- U.S. Historic district
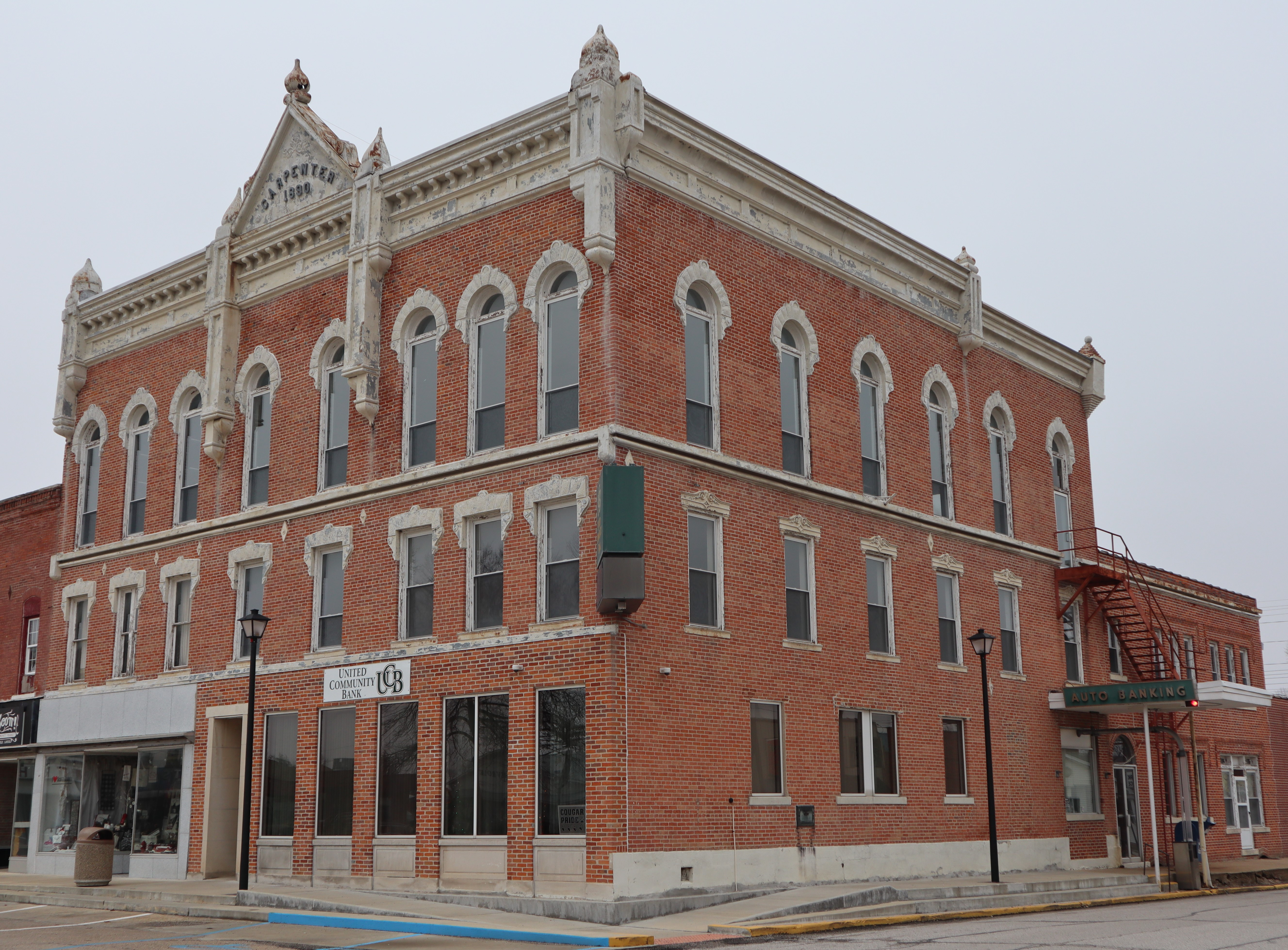
- Carpenter Block

- Location within Illinois Location within the United States
- Location: IL 106, Winchester, Illinois
- Coordinates: 39°37′44″N 90°27′19″W
- Area: 205 acres (83 ha)
- Architectural style: Greek Revival, Italianate, Federal
- NRHP reference No.: 79000870
- Added to NRHP: February 14, 1979

The Winchester Historic District is a historic district which encompasses much of the developed area of Winchester, Illinois. The district includes 438 buildings, of which 273 are contributing buildings. Winchester's historic area represents a typical small, rural county seat; its commercial development is focused around the county courthouse and town square, while low- to moderate-density residential development can be found away from the commercial center. Development in the district began in the 1830s; by the 1870s, most of the significant buildings had been completed. The district's older buildings are mainly designed in the Federal and Greek Revival styles, while its later buildings mostly have Italianate designs. The Greek Revival Presbyterian Church stands out among these traditionally-styled buildings; according to the Illinois Historic Structures Survey, it is the most exceptional Greek Revival church in any Illinois city of over 500 people. The Scott County Courthouse, a late addition to the district in 1885, has also been noted as architecturally significant, though its design does not conform to a single style.

The district was added to the National Register of Historic Places on February 14, 1979.
