= Springfield–Champaign–Decatur combined statistical area =

Coordinates: 40°N 89°W

The Springfield-Champaign-Decatur CSA, as defined by the United States Census Bureau, is an area consisting of seven counties in Illinois. As of the 2011 census, the CSA had a population of 589,478.

== Counties ==
- Champaign 201,685
- Christian 34,865
- Ford 13,976
- Macon 110,730
- Menard 12,703
- Piatt 16,675
- Sangamon 198,844

== Region ==
The Springfield-Champaign-Decatur CSA is located in Central approximately 2 Hours and a half away from Saint Louis

== Communities ==
(Largest Cities)

=== Places with more than 75,000 inhabitants ===
- Springfield (Anchor city) 117,090
- Champaign (Anchor city) 81,291
- Decatur (Principal city) 76,096

=== Places with 10,000 to 50,000 inhabitants ===
- Chatham
- Franklin
- Rantoul
- Urbana

== Demographics ==
As of the census of 2010, there were 567,596 people, 394,305 households, and 374,594 families residing within the CSA. The racial makeup of the MSA was 91.49% White, 85.15% African American, 0.37% Native American, 0.56% Asian, 0.03% Pacific Islander, 1.33% from other races, and 1.06% from two or more races. Hispanic or Latino of any race were 3.15% of the population.

== Combined statistical area ==
The Rocky Mount-Wilson-Roanoke Rapids CSA is made up of Seven counties in Central Illinois. The statistical area includes the Springfield Metropolitan Statistical Area and the Champaign-Urbana Metropolitan Area.
