= Bloomfield, Scott County, Illinois =

Bloomfield, Illinois
- Unincorporated community
- Location within Illinois Location within the United States
- Coordinates: 39°39′07″N 90°33′22″W
- Country: United States
- State: Illinois
- County: Scott
- Elevation: 446 ft (136 m)
- Time zone: UTC-6 (Central (CST))
  - Summer (DST): UTC-5 (CDT)
- Area code: 217
- GNIS feature ID: 1747671

Bloomfield is an unincorporated community in Scott County, Illinois, United States. Bloomfield is 5.5 miles (8.9 km) west-northwest of Winchester.
