= Riggston, Illinois =

- Unincorporated community
- Location within Illinois Location within the United States
- Coordinates: 39°41′41″N 90°25′24″W
- Country: United States
- State: Illinois
- County: Scott

Area
  - Total: 0.027 sq mi (0.07 km^{2})
  - Land: 0.027 sq mi (0.07 km^{2})
  - Water: 0 sq mi (0.00 km^{2})
- Elevation: 600 ft (180 m)

Population (2020)
  - Total: 14
  - Density: 529.4/sq mi (204.41/km^{2})
- Time zone: UTC-6 (Central (CST))
  - Summer (DST): UTC-5 (CDT)
- Area code: 217
- GNIS feature ID: 2804100

Riggston is an unincorporated community in Scott County, Illinois, United States. Riggston is 5 miles (8.0 km) north-northeast of Winchester. As of the 2020 census, Riggston had a population of 14.

== Demographics ==
Historical population
Census	Pop.	Note	%±
2020	14		—
U.S. Decennial Census

Riggston first appeared as a census designated place in the 2020 U.S. census.
