= Concord, Illinois =

- Village
- Location in Morgan County, Illinois
- Coordinates: 39°48′55″N 90°22′25″W
- Country: United States
- State: Illinois
- County: Morgan

Area
  - Total: 0.25 sq mi (0.64 km^{2})
- Elevation: 594 ft (181 m)

Population (2020)
  - Total: 150
  - Density: 603/sq mi (232.9/km^{2})
- Time zone: UTC-6 (CST)
  - Summer (DST): UTC-5 (CDT)
- ZIP code: 62631
- Area code: 217
- FIPS code: 17-16054
- GNIS feature ID: 2398611

Concord is a village in Morgan County, Illinois, United States. The population was 150 at the 2020 census. It is part of the Jacksonville Micropolitan Statistical Area.

== Geography ==
Concord is in northwestern Morgan County, 12 miles (19 km) northwest of Jacksonville, the county seat, and 5 miles (8 km) north of Chapin.

According to the U.S. Census Bureau, Concord has a total area of 0.25 square miles (0.65 km^{2}), all land. Most of the village drains southward to a tributary of Coon Run, which flows west toward the Illinois River. The northernmost part of the village drains to headwaters of Mud Creek, a north-flowing tributary of Indian Creek, which runs west to the Illinois River.

== Demographics ==
Historical population
| Census | Pop. | Note | %± |
|---|---|---|---|
| 1880 | 149 | | — |
| 1920 | 318 | | — |
| 1930 | 280 | | −11.9% |
| 1940 | 257 | | −8.2% |
| 1950 | 278 | | 8.2% |
| 1960 | 210 | | −24.5% |
| 1970 | 207 | | −1.4% |
| 1980 | 205 | | −1.0% |
| 1990 | 172 | | −16.1% |
| 2000 | 176 | | 2.3% |
| 2010 | 167 | | −5.1% |
| 2020 | 150 | | −10.2% |
U.S. Decennial Census

As of the census of 2000, there were 176 people, 69 households, and 52 families residing in the village. The population density was 670.2 inhabitants per square mile (258.8/km^{2}). There were 70 housing units at an average density of 266.6 per square mile (102.9/km^{2}). The racial makeup of the village was 98.30% White, 1.14% Native American, and 0.57% from two or more races.

There were 69 households, out of which 40.6% had children under the age of 18 living with them, 66.7% were married couples living together, 2.9% had a female householder with no husband present, and 23.2% were non-families. 20.3% of all households were made up of individuals, and 11.6% had someone living alone who was 65 years of age or older. The average household size was 2.55 and the average family size was 2.94.

In the village, the population was spread out, with 25.6% under the age of 18, 6.3% from 18 to 24, 25.6% from 25 to 44, 29.0% from 45 to 64, and 13.6% who were 65 years of age or older. The median age was 41 years. For every 100 females, there were 122.8 males. For every 100 females age 18 and over, there were 111.3 males.

The median income for a household in the village was $30,000, and the median income for a family was $32,250. Males had a median income of $29,750 versus $22,083 for females. The per capita income for the village was $13,212. About 7.0% of families and 18.6% of the population were below the poverty line, including 33.3% of those under the age of eighteen and 8.6% of those 65 or over.
