= Scott County Courthouse (Illinois) =

Local government building in the United States

- U.S. Historic district – Contributing property
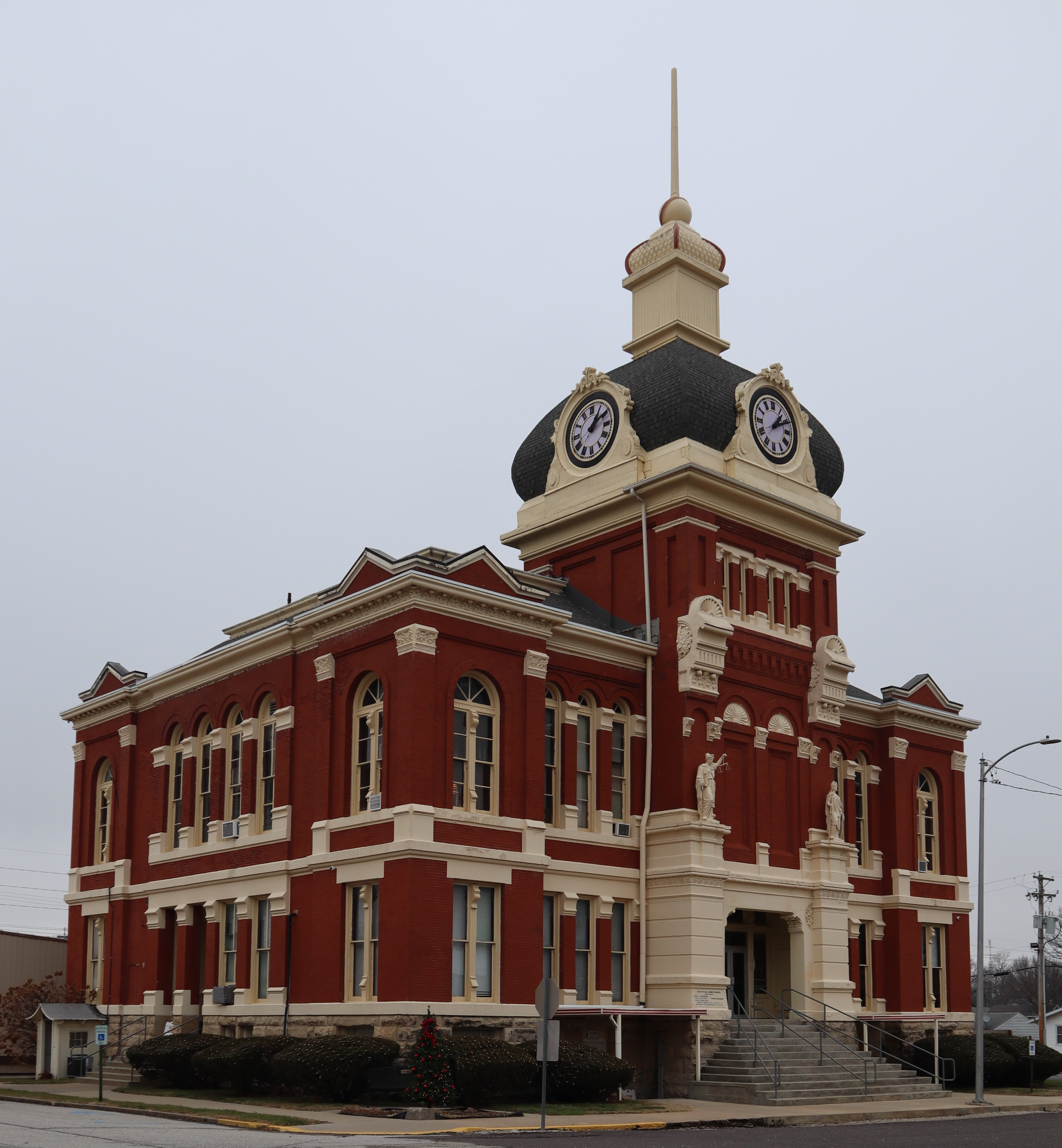
- Southwestern corner in 2025

- Location within Illinois Location within the United States
- Interactive map showing the location of Scott County Courthouse
- Location: Market Street at Hill Street, Winchester, Illinois
- Coordinates: 39°37′44″N 90°27′19″W
- Built: 1885
- Architectural style: Eclectic
- Part of: Winchester Historic District (ID87000724)
- Added to NRHP: February 14, 1979

The Scott County Courthouse is a government building in Winchester, the county seat of Scott County, Illinois, United States. Completed in 1885, it is the third courthouse in the county's history.

Scott County's first settlers arrived in 1820, one year after the Indians ceded the region to Americans. A pair of local shopkeepers decided to start a town on Sandy Creek in 1830, and one of them chose to name it for his hometown, Winchester, Kentucky. In 1839, the General Assembly created Scott County out of a portion of Morgan County. Winchester became the county seat, as local residents offered to donate land and money for a courthouse and jail.

The new county's officials operated out of temporary facilities for just two years before the first courthouse was completed. This square two-story brick building served for forty-four years before the construction of the current courthouse. County officials chose the St. Louis firm of James Stewart to design their new courthouse in 1885, and William Buckingham was the general contractor. When the building was completed, Scott County had spent approximately $35,500. The finished building is a two-story brick structure that rests on a stone foundation.

Rather than conforming to a single architectural style, the courthouse combines elements of different styles to an exceptional degree; in 1977, an Illinois Department of Conservation historic preservation report remarked that the courthouse "is so uniquely eclectic as to defy categorization." Square sections with a single rounded-arch window on each story are placed on the building's corners, while the remaining portions of the sides feature several similar windows spaced closely together. A stone stringcourse visually separates the stories. Above the entrance rises a three-story tower topped with an exceptional onion dome. In 1917, the county converted the tower into a clock tower.

In 1979, much of Winchester was designated a historic district, the Winchester Historic District, and listed on the National Register of Historic Places. The courthouse is the largest building within the district's boundaries, and also one of the most critical of the district's contributing properties.
