= McEvers Island =

Island in the Illinois River

Coordinates: 39°32′10″N 90°34′32″W

McEvers Island is an uninhabited fluvial island in the Illinois River. Approximately 1 mile (1.6 km) long, it is legally part of Montezuma Township within Pike County in the U.S. state of Illinois. The island, at Mile 48.5, is often used as a landmark by commercial and pleasure boaters traversing the river. Boaters often anchor or tie up in the narrow, sheltered channel east of the island, bordering the Scott County Illinois mainland.
