= Lake Jacksonville (Illinois) =

- Location within Illinois
- Location: Morgan County, Illinois
- Coordinates: 39°40′30″N 90°11′53″W
- Type: reservoir
- Basin countries: United States
- Surface area: 442 acres (1.79 km^{2})
- Surface elevation: 643 ft (196 m)

Lake Jacksonville is a 442 acres (179 ha) reservoir located in Morgan County in the U.S. state of Illinois. Located 4 miles (6.4 km) southeast of Jacksonville, it provides drinking water and recreational opportunities to the central Illinois city. The reservoir drains into Big Sandy Creek, a tributary of the Illinois River.

== Description ==
Lake Jacksonville is actively managed for camping, power boating, and fishing recreation. Proof of licenses and insurance are required to lower a boat into the lake. Fishing resources center on bluegill, hybrid striped bass, largemouth bass, smallmouth bass, yellow bullhead, channel catfish, white crappie, and muskie. A drowned coastline lake, Lake Jacksonville has approximately 21 miles of shoreline. It is 31 feet deep at its deepest point. The nearest exit on a limited-access highway is Exit 64 on Interstate 72, near South Jacksonville, Illinois.
