= Merritt, Illinois =

- Unincorporated community and Census-designated place
- Location within Illinois Location within the United States
- Coordinates: 39°42′54″N 90°24′57″W
- Country: United States
- State: Illinois
- County: Scott

Area
  - Total: 0.039 sq mi (0.10 km^{2})
  - Land: 0.039 sq mi (0.10 km^{2})
  - Water: 0 sq mi (0.00 km^{2})
- Elevation: 600 ft (180 m)

Population (2020)
  - Total: 48
  - Density: 1,217.0/sq mi (469.89/km^{2})
- Time zone: UTC-6 (Central (CST))
  - Summer (DST): UTC-5 (CDT)
- ZIP code: 62650
- Area code: 217
- GNIS feature ID: 2804098

Merritt is an unincorporated community and Census-designated place in Scott County, Illinois, United States. As of the 2020 census, Merritt had a population of 48. Merritt is 4.5 miles (7.2 km) east of Exeter.

== Demographics ==
Historical population
Census	Pop.	Note	%±
2020	48		—
U.S. Decennial Census

Merritt first appeared as a census designated place in the 2020 U.S. census.
