= Lynnville, Illinois =

- Village
- Location in Morgan County, Illinois
- Coordinates: 39°41′09″N 90°20′45″W
- Country: United States
- State: Illinois
- County: Morgan

Area
  - Total: 0.077 sq mi (0.20 km^{2})
  - Land: 0.077 sq mi (0.20 km^{2})
  - Water: 0 sq mi (0.00 km^{2})
- Elevation: 620 ft (190 m)

Population (2020)
  - Total: 96
  - Density: 1,241.2/sq mi (479.22/km^{2})
- Time zone: UTC-6 (CST)
  - Summer (DST): UTC-5 (CDT)
- ZIP code: 62650
- Area code: 217
- FIPS code: 17-45369
- GNIS feature ID: 2399209

Lynnville is a village in Morgan County, Illinois, United States. The population was 96 at the 2020 census. It is part of the Jacksonville Micropolitan Statistical Area.

== Geography ==
Lynnville is in western Morgan County, 8 miles (13 km) west-southwest of Jacksonville, the county seat. Interstate 72 and U.S. Route 36 pass 1/2 mile (0.80 km) south of the village, but with no direct access. The former alignment of U.S. Route 36 passes the same distance north of the village.

According to the U.S. Census Bureau, Lynnville has a total area of 0.08 square miles (0.21 km^{2}), all land.

== Demographics ==
Historical population
Census	Pop.	Note	%±
1900	176		—
1910	94		−46.6%
1920	123		30.9%
1930	97		−21.1%
1940	108		11.3%
1950	101		−6.5%
1960	97		−4.0%
1970	125		28.9%
1980	159		27.2%
1990	125		−21.4%
2000	137		9.6%
2010	117		−14.6%
2020	96		−17.9%
U.S. Decennial Census

As of the census of 2000, there were 137 people, 55 households, and 38 families residing in the village. The population density was 1,737.1 inhabitants per square mile (670.7/km^{2}). There were 57 housing units at an average density of 722.8 per square mile (279.1/km^{2}). The racial makeup of the village was 99.27% White and 0.73% Native American. Hispanic or Latino of any race were 0.73% of the population.

There were 55 households, out of which 29.1% had children under the age of 18 living with them, 54.5% were married couples living together, 7.3% had a female householder with no husband present, and 30.9% were non-families. 25.5% of all households were made up of individuals, and 14.5% had someone living alone who was 65 years of age or older. The average household size was 2.49 and the average family size was 3.03.

In the village, the population was spread out, with 21.9% under the age of 18, 13.9% from 18 to 24, 26.3% from 25 to 44, 24.1% from 45 to 64, and 13.9% who were 65 years of age or older. The median age was 34 years. For every 100 females, there were 107.6 males. For every 100 females age 18 and over, there were 114.0 males.

The median income for a household in the village was $38,000, and the median income for a family was $40,313. Males had a median income of $19,375 versus $21,500 for females. The per capita income for the village was $14,919. There were none of the families and 1.4% of the population living below the poverty line, including no under eighteens and none of those over 64.
