= Naples, Illinois =

Naples
- Town
- Location of Naples in Scott County, Illinois.
- Coordinates: 39°45′08″N 90°36′27″W
- Country: United States
- State: Illinois
- County: Scott
- Incorporated: February 1, 1839

Area
  - Total: 0.61 sq mi (1.57 km^{2})
  - Land: 0.61 sq mi (1.57 km^{2})
  - Water: 0 sq mi (0.00 km^{2})
- Elevation: 436 ft (133 m)

Population (2020)
  - Total: 100
  - Density: 165/sq mi (63.8/km^{2})
- Time zone: UTC-6 (CST)
  - Summer (DST): UTC-5 (CDT)
- ZIP code: 62665
- Area code: 217
- FIPS code: 17-51661
- GNIS feature ID: 2396795

Naples is an incorporated town in Scott County in the U.S. state of Illinois. The population was 100 at the 2020 census. It is part of the Jacksonville Micropolitan Statistical Area.

== History ==
The Potawatomi Trail of Death passed through here in 1838.

== Geography ==
According to the 2010 census, Naples has a total area of 0.61 square miles (1.58 km^{2}), all land.

== Demographics ==
Historical population
Census	Pop.	Note	%±
1880	442		—
1890	452		2.3%
1900	398		−11.9%
1910	457		14.8%
1920	384		−16.0%
1930	252		−34.4%
1940	260		3.2%
1950	141		−45.8%
1960	92		−34.8%
1970	100		8.7%
1980	128		28.0%
1990	130		1.6%
2000	134		3.1%
2010	130		−3.0%
2020	100		−23.1%
U.S. Decennial Census

As of the census of 2000, there were 134 people, 45 households, and 32 families residing in the town. The population density was 221.6 inhabitants per square mile (85.6/km^{2}). There were 73 housing units at an average density of 120.7 per square mile (46.6/km^{2}). The racial makeup of the town was 98.51% White, 0.75% Native American, 0.75% from other races. Hispanic or Latino of any race were 4.48% of the population.

There were 45 households, out of which 51.1% had children under the age of 18 living with them, 46.7% were married couples living together, 17.8% had a female householder with no husband present, and 26.7% were non-families. 17.8% of all households were made up of individuals, and 4.4% had someone living alone who was 65 years of age or older. The average household size was 2.98 and the average family size was 3.27.

In the town, the population was spread out, with 34.3% under the age of 18, 10.4% from 18 to 24, 33.6% from 25 to 44, 19.4% from 45 to 64, and 2.2% who were 65 years of age or older. The median age was 30 years. For every 100 females, there were 94.2 males. For every 100 females age 18 and over, there were 104.7 males.

The median income for a household in the town was $27,083, and the median income for a family was $26,667. Males had a median income of $42,500 versus $19,500 for females. The per capita income for the town was $10,719. There were 26.7% of families and 29.3% of the population living below the poverty line, including 35.1% of under eighteens and none of those over 64.
