= Murrayville, Illinois =

- Village
- Location in Morgan County, Illinois
- Coordinates: 39°34′45″N 90°14′58″W
- Country: United States
- State: Illinois
- County: Morgan

Area
  - Total: 0.50 sq mi (1.29 km^{2})
  - Land: 0.50 sq mi (1.29 km^{2})
  - Water: 0 sq mi (0.00 km^{2})
- Elevation: 682 ft (208 m)

Population (2020)
  - Total: 567
  - Density: 1,142.5/sq mi (441.13/km^{2})
- Time zone: UTC-6 (CST)
  - Summer (DST): UTC-5 (CDT)
- ZIP code: 62668
- Area code: 217
- FIPS code: 17-51479
- GNIS feature ID: 2399432

Murrayville is a village in Morgan County, Illinois, United States. The population was 567 at the 2020 census. It is part of the Jacksonville Micropolitan Statistical Area.

== Geography ==
Murrayville is in southern Morgan County, 11 miles (18 km) south of Jacksonville, the county seat. According to the U.S. Census Bureau, Murrayville has a total area of 0.50 square miles (1.29 km^{2}), all land.

== Demographics ==
Historical population
| Census | Pop. | Note | %± |
|---|---|---|---|
| 1860 | 1,160 | | — |
| 1880 | 385 | | — |
| 1890 | 422 | | 9.6% |
| 1900 | 467 | | 10.7% |
| 1910 | 450 | | −3.6% |
| 1920 | 523 | | 16.2% |
| 1930 | 502 | | −4.0% |
| 1940 | 478 | | −4.8% |
| 1950 | 405 | | −15.3% |
| 1960 | 442 | | 9.1% |
| 1970 | 595 | | 34.6% |
| 1980 | 712 | | 19.7% |
| 1990 | 673 | | −5.5% |
| 2000 | 644 | | −4.3% |
| 2010 | 587 | | −8.9% |
| 2020 | 567 | | −3.4% |
U.S. Decennial Census

As of the census of 2000, there were 644 people, 243 households, and 182 families residing in the village. The population density was 1,292.4 inhabitants per square mile (499.0/km^{2}). There were 250 housing units at an average density of 501.7 per square mile (193.7/km^{2}). The racial makeup of the village was 99.38% White, and 0.62% from two or more races.

There were 243 households, out of which 35.4% had children under the age of 18 living with them, 65.8% were married couples living together, 6.6% had a female householder with no husband present, and 25.1% were non-families. 22.2% of all households were made up of individuals, and 11.5% had someone living alone who was 65 years of age or older. The average household size was 2.65 and the average family size was 3.08.

In the village, the population was spread out, with 26.7% under the age of 18, 9.0% from 18 to 24, 30.0% from 25 to 44, 23.1% from 45 to 64, and 11.2% who were 65 years of age or older. The median age was 36 years. For every 100 females, there were 94.6 males. For every 100 females age 18 and over, there were 93.4 males.

The median income for a household in the village was $42,917, and the median income for a family was $50,476. Males had a median income of $31,563 versus $23,594 for females. The per capita income for the village was $15,353. About 5.7% of families and 11.2% of the population were below the poverty line, including 13.7% of those under age 18 and 15.0% of those age 65 or over.

== Notable person ==
- Warren Wright, Illinois State Treasurer, was born in Murrayville.
