= Glasgow, Illinois =

Glasgow
- Village
- Location of Glasgow in Scott County, Illinois.
- Coordinates: 39°32′55″N 90°28′48″W
- Country: United States
- State: Illinois
- County: Scott

Area
  - Total: 1.01 sq mi (2.62 km^{2})
  - Land: 1.01 sq mi (2.62 km^{2})
  - Water: 0 sq mi (0.00 km^{2})
- Elevation: 581 ft (177 m)

Population (2020)
  - Total: 113
  - Estimate (2024): 107
  - Density: 111.7/sq mi (43.14/km^{2})
- Time zone: UTC-6 (CST)
  - Summer (DST): UTC-5 (CDT)
- ZIP code: 62694
- Area code: 217
- FIPS code: 17-29496
- GNIS feature ID: 2398969

Glasgow is a village in Scott County, Illinois, United States. The population was 113 at the 2020 census. It is part of the Jacksonville Micropolitan Statistical Area.

== Geography ==
According to the 2010 census, Glasgow has a total area of 1.01 square miles (2.62 km^{2}), all land.

== Demographics ==
Historical population
Census	Pop.	Note	%±
1880	249		—
1890	187		−24.9%
1900	235		25.7%
1910	215		−8.5%
1920	235		9.3%
1930	222		−5.5%
1940	222		0.0%
1950	158		−28.8%
1960	166		5.1%
1970	148		−10.8%
1980	171		15.5%
1990	163		−4.7%
2000	170		4.3%
2010	141		−17.1%
2020	113		−19.9%
U.S. Decennial Census

As of the census of 2000, there were 170 people, 66 households, and 52 families residing in the village. The population density was 168.1 inhabitants per square mile (64.9/km^{2}). There were 72 housing units at an average density of 71.2 per square mile (27.5/km^{2}). The racial makeup of the village was 100.00% White.

There were 66 households, out of which 31.8% had children under the age of 18 living with them, 69.7% were married couples living together, 4.5% had a female householder with no husband present, and 21.2% were non-families. 19.7% of all households were made up of individuals, and 7.6% had someone living alone who was 65 years of age or older. The average household size was 2.58 and the average family size was 2.96.

In the village, the population was spread out, with 25.3% under the age of 18, 5.9% from 18 to 24, 28.8% from 25 to 44, 22.9% from 45 to 64, and 17.1% who were 65 years of age or older. The median age was 41 years. For every 100 females, there were 107.3 males. For every 100 females age 18 and over, there were 122.8 males.

The median income for a household in the village was $25,000, and the median income for a family was $30,000. Males had a median income of $27,917 versus $16,250 for females. The per capita income for the village was $11,172. About 16.0% of families and 20.2% of the population were below the poverty line, including 29.2% of those under the age of eighteen and none of those 65 or over.
