= Alsey, Illinois =

Alsey
- Village
- Interactive map of Alsey
- Coordinates: 39°33′33″N 90°25′58″W
- Country: United States
- State: Illinois
- County: Scott

Area
  - Total: 0.56 sq mi (1.45 km^{2})
  - Land: 0.55 sq mi (1.42 km^{2})
  - Water: 0.012 sq mi (0.03 km^{2})
- Elevation: 630 ft (190 m)

Population (2020)
  - Total: 195
  - Density: 354.9/sq mi (137.03/km^{2})
- Time zone: UTC-6 (CST)
  - Summer (DST): UTC-5 (CDT)
- ZIP code: 62610
- Area code: 217
- FIPS code: 17-00997
- GNIS feature ID: 2397945

Alsey is a village in Scott County, Illinois, USA. As of the 2020 census, Alsey had a population of 195. It is part of the Jacksonville Micropolitan Statistical Area.

== History ==
Alsey was originally called Smithfield, and under the latter name was laid out in 1870 by Alsey R. Smith, and named for him. A post office called Alsey has been in operation since 1872.

== Geography ==
According to the 2010 census, Alsey has a total area of 0.56 square miles (1.45 km^{2}), of which 0.55 square miles (1.42 km^{2}) (or 98.21%) is land and 0.01 square miles (0.03 km^{2}) (or 1.79%) is water.

== Demographics ==
Historical population
Census	Pop.	Note	%±
1940	290		—
1950	294		1.4%
1960	248		−15.6%
1970	242		−2.4%
1980	318		31.4%
1990	253		−20.4%
2000	246		−2.8%
2010	227		−7.7%
2020	195		−14.1%
U.S. Decennial Census

As of the census of 2000, there were 246 people, 97 households, and 67 families residing in the village. The population density was 441.7 inhabitants per square mile (170.5/km^{2}). There were 102 housing units at an average density of 183.1 per square mile (70.7/km^{2}). The racial makeup of the village was 98.78% White and 1.22% Native American.

There were 97 households, out of which 36.1% had children under the age of 18 living with them, 55.7% were married couples living together, 10.3% had a female householder with no husband present, and 29.9% were non-families. 25.8% of all households were made up of individuals, and 14.4% had someone living alone who was 65 years of age or older. The average household size was 2.54 and the average family size was 3.04.

In the village, the population was spread out, with 26.4% under the age of 18, 6.1% from 18 to 24, 32.9% from 25 to 44, 23.6% from 45 to 64, and 11.0% who were 65 years of age or older. The median age was 36 years. For every 100 females, there were 92.2 males. For every 100 females age 18 and over, there were 88.5 males.

The median income for a household in the village was $33,750, and the median income for a family was $40,833. Males had a median income of $29,844 versus $18,214 for females. The per capita income for the village was $15,652. About 4.2% of families and 8.1% of the population were below the poverty line, including 14.0% of those under the age of eighteen and 6.4% of those 65 or over.
