= Bluffs, Illinois =

Bluffs
- Village
- Location of Bluffs in Scott County, Illinois.
- Coordinates: 39°45′05″N 90°32′07″W
- Country: United States
- State: Illinois
- County: Scott

Area
  - Total: 0.89 sq mi (2.31 km^{2})
  - Land: 0.89 sq mi (2.31 km^{2})
  - Water: 0 sq mi (0.00 km^{2})
- Elevation: 472 ft (144 m)

Population (2020)
  - Total: 618
  - Density: 692.4/sq mi (267.32/km^{2})
- Time zone: UTC-6 (CST)
  - Summer (DST): UTC-5 (CDT)
- Zip code: 62621
- Area code: 217
- FIPS code: 17-06899
- GNIS feature ID: 2398143

Bluffs is a village in Scott County, Illinois, United States. As of the 2020 census, Bluffs had a population of 618. It was briefly (1969–1971) the location of the WJJY TV Mast, the tallest structure (1,610 feet tall - 491 m) built to that date in Illinois.

Bluffs is part of the Jacksonville Micropolitan Statistical Area.

== Geography ==
According to the 2010 census, Bluffs has a total area of 0.89 square miles (2.31 km^{2}), all land.

== Demographics ==
Historical population
Census	Pop.	Note	%±
1880	162		—
1890	421		159.9%
1900	539		28.0%
1910	766		42.1%
1920	1,009		31.7%
1930	953		−5.6%
1940	839		−12.0%
1950	784		−6.6%
1960	779		−0.6%
1970	866		11.2%
1980	821		−5.2%
1990	774		−5.7%
2000	748		−3.4%
2010	715		−4.4%
2020	618		−13.6%
U.S. Decennial Census

As of the census of 2000, there were 748 people, 307 households, and 210 families residing in the village. The population density was 736.9 inhabitants per square mile (284.5/km^{2}). There were 330 housing units at an average density of 325.1 per square mile (125.5/km^{2}). The racial makeup of the village was 99.60% White, 0.27% Asian, 0.13% from other races.

There were 307 households, out of which 36.2% had children under the age of 18 living with them, 52.4% were married couples living together, 12.1% had a female householder with no husband present, and 31.3% were non-families. 28.7% of all households were made up of individuals, and 16.6% had someone living alone who was 65 years of age or older. The average household size was 2.44 and the average family size was 2.97.

In the village, the population was spread out, with 27.1% under the age of 18, 10.0% from 18 to 24, 26.5% from 25 to 44, 21.5% from 45 to 64, and 14.8% who were 65 years of age or older. The median age was 36 years. For every 100 females, there were 86.5 males. For every 100 females age 18 and over, there were 81.7 males.

The median income for a household in the village was $34,531, and the median income for a family was $41,875. Males had a median income of $36,354 versus $22,188 for females. The per capita income for the village was $16,705. About 6.7% of families and 11.8% of the population were below the poverty line, including 15.7% of those under age 18 and 16.2% of those age 65 or over.
