= Exeter, Illinois =

Exeter
- Village
- Location of Exeter in Scott County, Illinois.
- Coordinates: 39°43′04″N 90°29′57″W
- Country: United States
- State: Illinois
- County: Scott

Area
  - Total: 0.69 sq mi (1.79 km^{2})
  - Land: 0.69 sq mi (1.79 km^{2})
  - Water: 0 sq mi (0.00 km^{2})
- Elevation: 604 ft (184 m)

Population (2020)
  - Total: 87
  - Density: 126/sq mi (48.7/km^{2})
- Time zone: UTC-6 (CST)
  - Summer (DST): UTC-5 (CDT)
- ZIP Code(s): 62621
- Area code: 217
- FIPS code: 17-24699
- GNIS feature ID: 2398850

Exeter is a village in Scott County, Illinois, United States. As of the 2020 census, Exeter had a population of 87. It is part of the Jacksonville Micropolitan Statistical Area.

== Geography ==
According to the 2010 census, Exeter has a total area of 0.69 square miles (1.79 km^{2}), all land.

== History ==
Exeter was given the name of the origin of its founders, Exeter, New Hampshire.

The Potawatomi Trail of Death passed through here in 1838.

== Demographics ==
Historical population
Census	Pop.	Note	%±
1880	291		—
1890	244		−16.2%
1900	233		−4.5%
1910	201		−13.7%
1920	167		−16.9%
1930	89		−46.7%
1940	126		41.6%
1950	107		−15.1%
1960	77		−28.0%
1970	76		−1.3%
1980	73		−3.9%
1990	59		−19.2%
2000	70		18.6%
2010	65		−7.1%
2020	87		33.8%
U.S. Decennial Census

As of the census of 2000, there were 70 people, 27 households, and 17 families residing in the village. The population density was 101.5 inhabitants per square mile (39.2/km^{2}). There were 32 housing units at an average density of 46.4 per square mile (17.9/km^{2}). The racial makeup of the village was 98.57% White and 1.43% Native American.

There were 27 households, out of which 29.6% had children under the age of 18 living with them, 44.4% were married couples living together, 14.8% had a female householder with no husband present, and 37.0% were non-families. 25.9% of all households were made up of individuals, and 7.4% had someone living alone who was 65 years of age or older. The average household size was 2.59 and the average family size was 3.29.

In the village, the population was spread out, with 20.0% under the age of 18, 15.7% from 18 to 24, 22.9% from 25 to 44, 28.6% from 45 to 64, and 12.9% who were 65 years of age or older. The median age was 41 years. For every 100 females, there were 125.8 males. For every 100 females age 18 and over, there were 100.0 males.

The median income for a household in the village was $46,875, and the median income for a family was $51,250. Males had a median income of $26,250 versus $18,036 for females. The per capita income for the village was $18,968. None of the population and none of the families were below the poverty line.
