= Manchester, Illinois =

Manchester
- Village
- Location of Manchester in Scott County, Illinois.
- Coordinates: 39°32′32″N 90°19′49″W
- Country: United States
- State: Illinois
- County: Scott

Area
  - Total: 1.06 sq mi (2.75 km^{2})
  - Land: 1.06 sq mi (2.75 km^{2})
  - Water: 0 sq mi (0.00 km^{2})
- Elevation: 686 ft (209 m)

Population (2020)
  - Total: 265
  - Density: 249.3/sq mi (96.25/km^{2})
- Time zone: UTC-6 (CST)
  - Summer (DST): UTC-5 (CDT)
- ZIP code: 62663
- Area code: 217
- FIPS code: 17-46331
- GNIS feature ID: 2399238

Manchester is a village in southeast Scott County, Illinois, United States. As of the 2020 census, Manchester had a population of 265. It is part of the Jacksonville Micropolitan Statistical Area.

== History ==
=== 2013 mass murder ===
On April 24, 2013, a shooting left six people dead (including one unborn child) and another injured. The suspect Ricky Smith, a nephew of the village's mayor, Ron Drake, was killed in a gunfight with police.

== Geography ==
According to the 2010 census, Manchester has a total area of 1.06 square miles (2.75 km^{2}), all land.

== Demographics ==
Historical population
Census	Pop.	Note	%±
1880	394		—
1890	408		3.6%
1900	430		5.4%
1910	480		11.6%
1920	456		−5.0%
1930	389		−14.7%
1940	348		−10.5%
1950	351		0.9%
1960	282		−19.7%
1970	335		18.8%
1980	387		15.5%
1990	347		−10.3%
2000	354		2.0%
2010	292		−17.5%
2020	265		−9.2%
U.S. Decennial Census

As of the census of 2000, there were 354 people, 136 households, and 99 families residing in the village. The population density was 341.8 inhabitants per square mile (132.0/km^{2}). There were 147 housing units at an average density of 141.9 per square mile (54.8/km^{2}). The racial makeup of the village was 100.00% White.

There were 136 households, out of which 33.1% had children under the age of 18 living with them, 64.7% were married couples living together, 5.1% had a female householder with no husband present, and 27.2% were non-families. 22.1% of all households were made up of individuals, and 11.8% had someone living alone who was 65 years of age or older. The average household size was 2.60 and the average family size was 3.05.

In the village, the population was spread out, with 24.6% under the age of 18, 10.2% from 18 to 24, 28.5% from 25 to 44, 21.2% from 45 to 64, and 15.5% who were 65 years of age or older. The median age was 35 years. For every 100 females, there were 102.3 males. For every 100 females age 18 and over, there were 99.3 males.

The median income for a household in the village was $31,875, and the median income for a family was $37,500. Males had a median income of $26,964 versus $21,528 for females. The per capita income for the village was $13,728. About 8.7% of families and 10.7% of the population were below the poverty line, including 17.8% of those under age 18 and 3.6% of those age 65 or over.
