= Franklin, Illinois =

- Village
- Location in Morgan County, Illinois
- Coordinates: 39°37′29″N 90°03′07″W
- Country: United States
- State: Illinois
- County: Morgan
- Founded: 1832

Area
  - Total: 0.83 sq mi (2.15 km^{2})
  - Land: 0.83 sq mi (2.15 km^{2})
  - Water: 0 sq mi (0.00 km^{2})
- Elevation: 689 ft (210 m)

Population (2020)
  - Total: 610
  - Density: 736.0/sq mi (284.17/km^{2})
- Time zone: UTC-6 (CST)
  - Summer (DST): UTC-5 (CDT)
- ZIP code: 62638
- Area code: 217
- FIPS code: 17-27663
- GNIS feature ID: 2398916
- Website: www.franklinillinois.net

Franklin is a village in Morgan County, Illinois, United States. The population was 610 at the 2020 census, unchanged from 2010. It is part of the Jacksonville Micropolitan Statistical Area.

== Geography ==
Franklin is in southeastern Morgan County. Illinois Route 104 runs through the southwest part of the village, leading northwest 14 miles (23 km) to Jacksonville, the county seat, and northeast 6 miles (10 km) to Waverly.

According to the U.S. Census Bureau, Franklin has a total area of 0.83 square miles (2.15 km^{2}), all land. The village drains southwest to the Left Fork of Apple Creek and east to Woods Creek. Both streams are tributaries of Apple Creek, a west-flowing tributary of the Illinois River.

== Demographics ==
Historical population
Census	Pop.	Note	%±
1880	316		—
1890	578		82.9%
1900	687		18.9%
1910	696		1.3%
1920	611		−12.2%
1930	528		−13.6%
1940	515		−2.5%
1950	438		−15.0%
1960	500		14.2%
1970	565		13.0%
1980	645		14.2%
1990	634		−1.7%
2000	586		−7.6%
2010	610		4.1%
2020	610		0.0%
U.S. Decennial Census

As of the census of 2000, there were 586 people, 226 households, and 169 families residing in the village. The population density was 801.3 inhabitants per square mile (309.4/km^{2}). There were 241 housing units at an average density of 329.5 per square mile (127.2/km^{2}). The racial makeup of the village was 98.98% White, 0.68% Native American, and 0.34% from two or more races. Hispanic or Latino of any race were 0.85% of the population.

There were 226 households, out of which 41.2% had children under the age of 18 living with them, 60.2% were married couples living together, 9.3% had a female householder with no husband present, and 24.8% were non-families. 18.1% of all households were made up of individuals, and 10.2% had someone living alone who was 65 years of age or older. The average household size was 2.59 and the average family size was 2.98.

In the village, the population was spread out, with 29.4% under the age of 18, 8.5% from 18 to 24, 29.9% from 25 to 44, 21.2% from 45 to 64, and 11.1% who were 65 years of age or older. the median age was 36 years. for every 100 females, there were 98.0 males. for every 100 females age 18 and over, there were 95.3 males.

The median income for a household in the village was $39,375, and the median income for a family was $47,813. Males had a median income of $35,000 versus $21,923 for females. The per capita income for the village was $16,327. about 6.1% of families and 8.6% of the population were below the poverty line, including 5.9% of those under age 18 and 15.5% of those age 65 or over.

== Education ==
Franklin Community Unit School District #1 provides education to the village and surrounding area.
