= Chapin, Illinois =

- Village
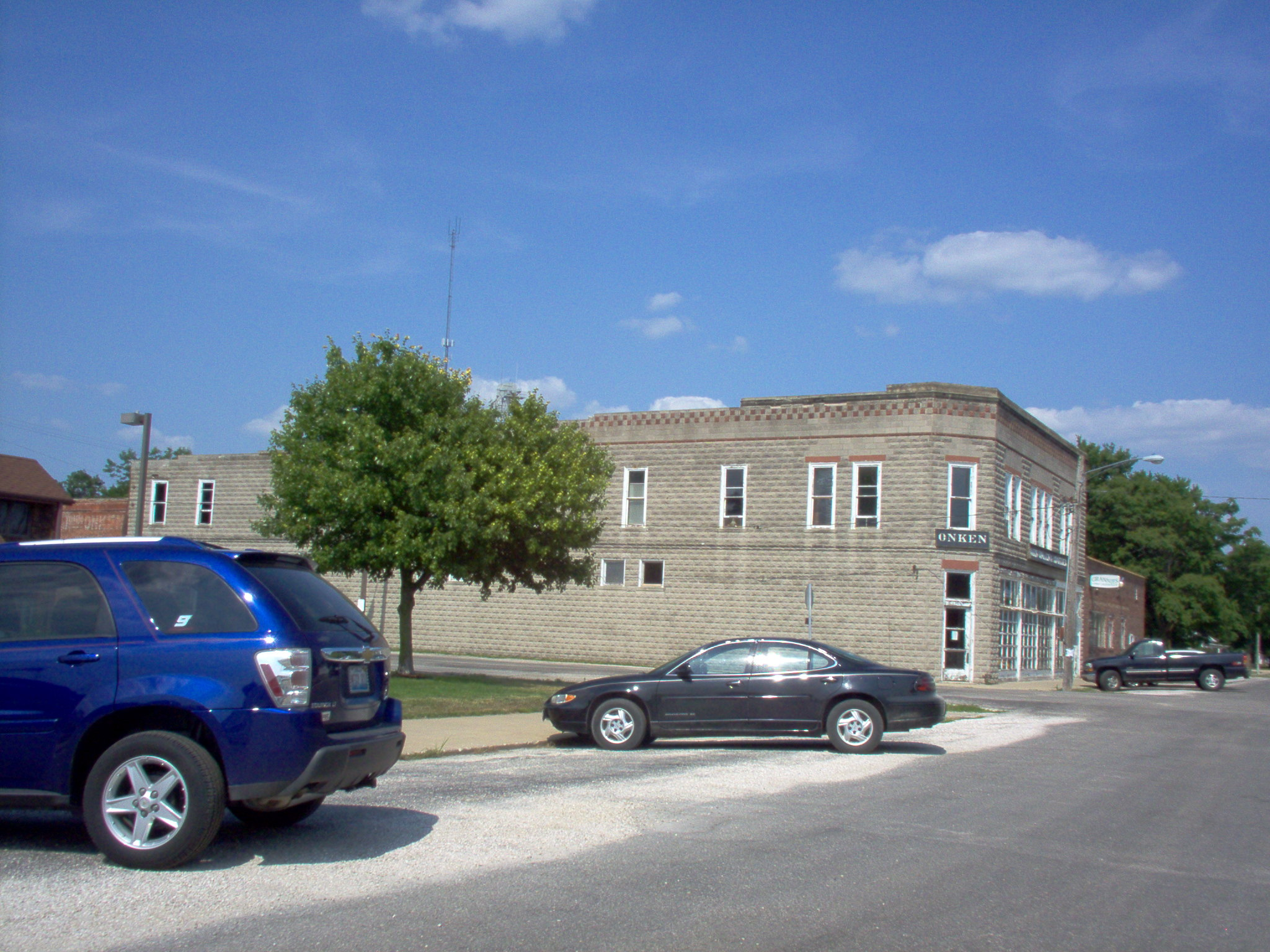
- Onken store in Chapin

- Location in Morgan County, Illinois
- Coordinates: 39°46′01″N 90°24′10″W
- Country: United States
- State: Illinois
- County: Morgan

Area
  - Total: 1.00 sq mi (2.59 km^{2})
  - Land: 1.00 sq mi (2.59 km^{2})
  - Water: 0 sq mi (0.00 km^{2})
- Elevation: 623 ft (190 m)

Population (2020)
  - Total: 475
  - Density: 475.8/sq mi (183.69/km^{2})
- Time zone: UTC-6 (CST)
  - Summer (DST): UTC-5 (CDT)
- ZIP code: 62628
- Area code: 217
- FIPS code: 17-12528
- GNIS feature ID: 2397602
- Website: www.villageofchapin.com

Chapin is a village in Morgan County, Illinois, United States. The population was 475 at the 2020 census. It is part of the Jacksonville Micropolitan Statistical Area.

== History ==
Chapin was named for its founders, Charles and Horace Chapin.

== Geography ==
Chapin is in northwest Morgan County along U.S. Route 67, which crosses the north side of the village. US 67 leads east 10 miles (16 km) to Jacksonville, the county seat, and northwest 22 miles (35 km) to Beardstown. Illinois Route 104 runs concurrently with US 67 through Chapin, leading east to downtown Jacksonville and northwest 10 miles (16 km) to Meredosia.

According to the U.S. Census Bureau, Chapin has a total area of 1.00 square mile (2.59 km^{2}), all land. The village sits on high ground which drains to three different stream systems. Lick Branch rises within the village limits and flows northeast to Indian Creek, a northwest-flowing tributary of the Illinois River. The northwest corner of the village is the source of one of the headwaters of Coon Run, which flows north then west to the Illinois River. The southern half of the village is drained by south-flowing tributaries of Mauvaise Terre Creek, which flows west to the Illinois.

== Demographics ==
Historical population
Census	Pop.	Note	%±
1880	223		—
1900	514		—
1910	552		7.4%
1920	565		2.4%
1930	500		−11.5%
1940	554		10.8%
1950	489		−11.7%
1960	477		−2.5%
1970	552		15.7%
1980	648		17.4%
1990	632		−2.5%
2000	592		−6.3%
2010	512		−13.5%
2020	475		−7.2%
U.S. Decennial Census

As of the census of 2000, there were 592 people, 227 households, and 168 families residing in the village. The population density was 607.1 inhabitants per square mile (234.4/km^{2}). There were 237 housing units at an average density of 243.0 per square mile (93.8/km^{2}). The racial makeup of the village was 99.16% White, 0.17% Native American, and 0.68% from two or more races.

There were 227 households, out of which 37.0% had children under the age of 18 living with them, 60.8% were married couples living together, 9.7% had a female householder with no husband present, and 25.6% were non-families. 23.3% of all households were made up of individuals, and 11.9% had someone living alone who was 65 years of age or older. The average household size was 2.61 and the average family size was 3.06.

In the village, the population was spread out, with 29.2% under the age of 18, 6.1% from 18 to 24, 28.0% from 25 to 44, 23.8% from 45 to 64, and 12.8% who were 65 years of age or older. The median age was 37 years. For every 100 females, there were 107.7 males. For every 100 females age 18 and over, there were 95.8 males.

The median income for a household in the village was $42,143, and the median income for a family was $43,482. Males had a median income of $28,906 versus $26,607 for females. The per capita income for the village was $16,972. About 8.2% of families and 8.9% of the population were below the poverty line, including 9.4% of those under age 18 and 14.3% of those age 65 or over.
