= Scott County, Illinois =

County in Illinois, United States

- County
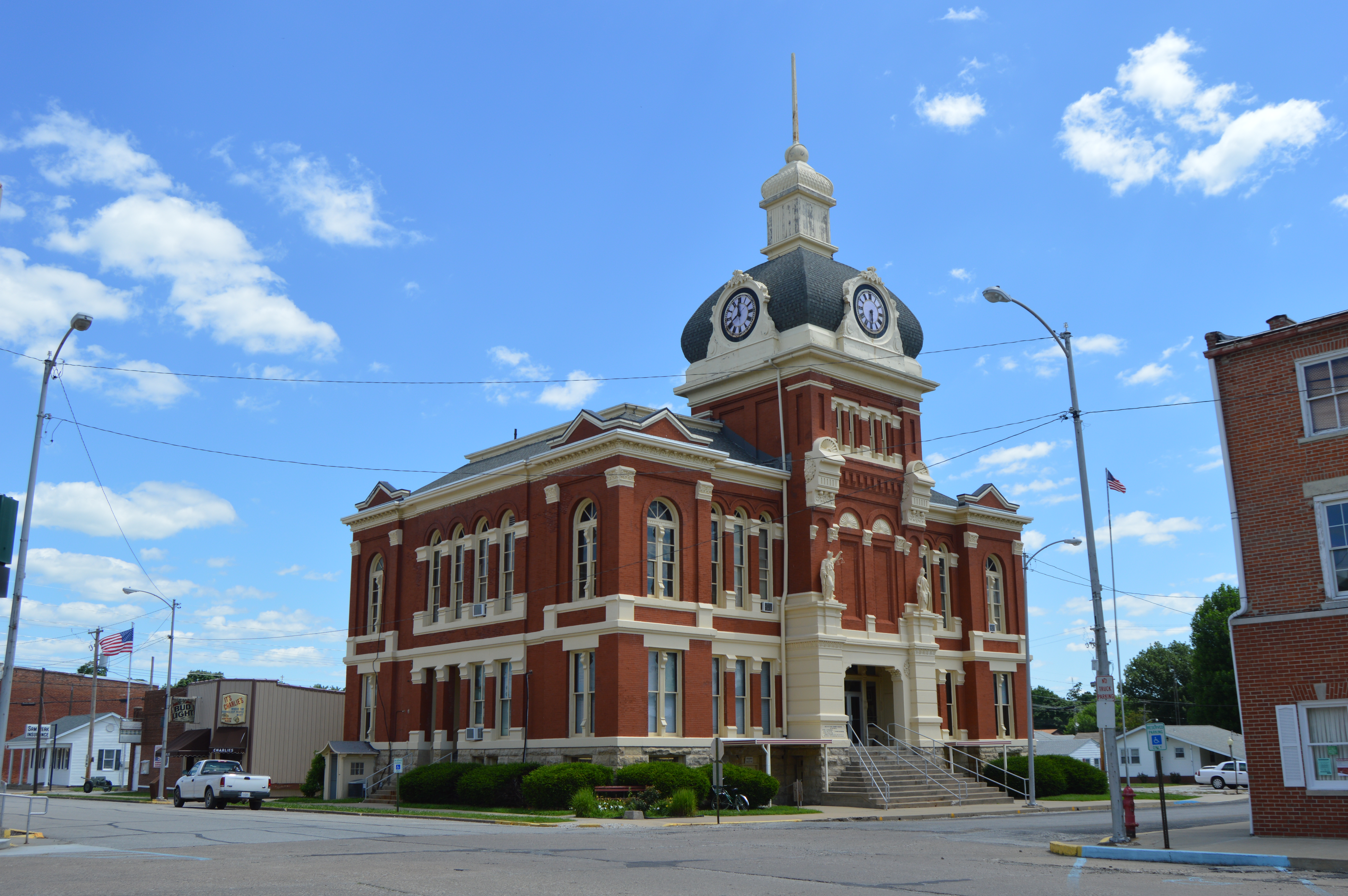
- Scott County Courthouse, Winchester

- Location within the U.S. state of Illinois
- Coordinates: 39°39′N 90°29′W
- Country: United States
- State: Illinois
- Founded: 1839
- Named for: Scott County, Kentucky
- Seat: Winchester
- Largest city: Winchester

Area
  - Total: 253 sq mi (660 km^{2})
  - Land: 251 sq mi (650 km^{2})
  - Water: 1.9 sq mi (4.9 km^{2}) 0.7%

Population (2020)
  - Total: 4,949
  - Estimate (2025): 4,866 ▼
  - Density: 19.7/sq mi (7.61/km^{2})
- Time zone: UTC−6 (Central)
  - Summer (DST): UTC−5 (CDT)
- Congressional district: 15th
- Website: scottcoil.gov

Scott County is a county located in the U.S. state of Illinois. According to the 2020 census, it had a population of 4,949, making it the fourth-least populous county in Illinois. Its county seat is Winchester.

Scott County is part of the Jacksonville, IL Micropolitan Statistical Area, which is also included in the Springfield-Jacksonville-Lincoln, IL Combined Statistical Area.

== History ==
Scott County was formed in 1839 out of Morgan County. It was named for Scott County, Kentucky.

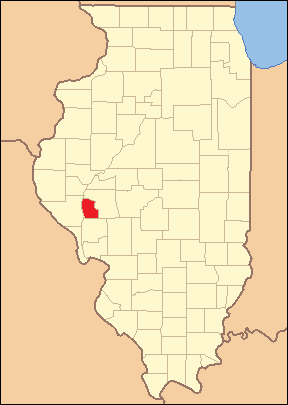
Scott County at the time of its creation in 1839

== Geography ==
According to the U.S. Census Bureau, the county has a total area of 253 square miles (660 km^{2}), of which 251 square miles (650 km^{2}) is land and 1.9 square miles (4.9 km^{2}) (0.7%) is water. The county's western boundary is formed by the Illinois River.

=== Climate and weather ===
Winchester, Illinois

Climate chart (precipitation, max. and min. temperature)
J	F	M	A	M	J	J	A	S	O	N	D
1.6 34 16	1.8 40 20	3.3 52 30	3.6 64 42	4.3 74 52	3.6 83 61	3.4 87 65	2.8 85 63	3 78 54	2.6 67 43	3.3 52 32	2.6 39 21
- █ Average max. and min. temperatures in °F
- █ Precipitation totals in inches
- Source: The Weather Channel
Metric conversion
J	F	M	A	M	J	J	A	S	O	N	D
41 1 −9	44 4 −7	83 11 −1	90 18 6	110 23 11	90 28 16	86 31 18	72 29 17	75 26 12	67 19 6	83 11 0	65 4 −6
- █ Average max. and min. temperatures in °C
- █ Precipitation totals in mm

In recent years, average temperatures in the county seat of Winchester have ranged from a low of 16 °F (−9 °C) in January to a high of 87 °F (31 °C) in July, although a record low of −26 °F (−32 °C) was recorded in January 1912 and a record high of 113 °F (45 °C) was recorded in July 1934. Average monthly precipitation ranged from 1.60 inches (41 mm) in January to 4.34 inches (110 mm) in May.

=== Major highways ===
- Interstate 72
- U.S. Route 36
- U.S. Route 67
- Illinois Route 106
- Illinois Route 100

=== Adjacent counties ===
- Morgan County (east)
- Greene County (south)
- Pike County (west)

== Demographics ==
Historical population
Census	Pop.	Note	%±
1840	6,215		—
1850	7,914		27.3%
1860	9,069		14.6%
1870	10,530		16.1%
1880	10,741		2.0%
1890	10,304		−4.1%
1900	10,455		1.5%
1910	10,067		−3.7%
1920	9,489		−5.7%
1930	8,539		−10.0%
1940	8,176		−4.3%
1950	7,245		−11.4%
1960	6,377		−12.0%
1970	6,096		−4.4%
1980	6,142		0.8%
1990	5,644		−8.1%
2000	5,537		−1.9%
2010	5,355		−3.3%
2020	4,949		−7.6%
2025 (est.)	4,866	▼	−1.7%
U.S. Decennial Census; 1790-1960 1900-1990; 1990-2000 2010

=== 2020 census ===
As of the 2020 census, the county had a population of 4,949. The median age was 44.4 years. 21.9% of residents were under the age of 18 and 20.3% of residents were 65 years of age or older. For every 100 females there were 98.3 males, and for every 100 females age 18 and over there were 97.7 males age 18 and over.

The racial makeup of the county was 96.3% White, 0.1% Black or African American, 0.1% American Indian and Alaska Native, 0.2% Asian, <0.1% Native Hawaiian and Pacific Islander, 0.3% from some other race, and 3.1% from two or more races. Hispanic or Latino residents of any race comprised 1.0% of the population.

<0.1% of residents lived in urban areas, while 100.0% lived in rural areas.

There were 2,102 households in the county, of which 29.5% had children under the age of 18 living in them. Of all households, 50.6% were married-couple households, 18.3% were households with a male householder and no spouse or partner present, and 24.3% were households with a female householder and no spouse or partner present. About 28.7% of all households were made up of individuals and 15.0% had someone living alone who was 65 years of age or older.

There were 2,388 housing units, of which 12.0% were vacant. Among occupied housing units, 78.8% were owner-occupied and 21.2% were renter-occupied. The homeowner vacancy rate was 1.6% and the rental vacancy rate was 8.8%.

=== Racial and ethnic composition ===
Scott County, Illinois – Racial and ethnic composition Note: the US Census treats Hispanic/Latino as an ethnic category. This table excludes Latinos from the racial categories and assigns them to a separate category. Hispanics/Latinos may be of any race.
Race / Ethnicity (NH = Non-Hispanic)	Pop 1980	Pop 1990	Pop 2000	Pop 2010	Pop 2020	% 1980	% 1990	% 2000	% 2010	% 2020
White alone (NH)	6,109	5,619	5,497	5,246	4,747	99.46%	99.56%	99.28%	97.96%	95.92%
Black or African American alone (NH)	0	1	2	5	5	0.00%	0.02%	0.04%	0.09%	0.10%
Native American or Alaska Native alone (NH)	3	6	8	9	1	0.05%	0.11%	0.14%	0.17%	0.02%
Asian alone (NH)	6	3	7	12	11	0.10%	0.05%	0.13%	0.22%	0.22%
Native Hawaiian or Pacific Islander alone (NH)	x	x	0	0	1	x	x	0.00%	0.00%	0.02%
Other race alone (NH)	1	0	2	2	5	0.02%	0.00%	0.04%	0.04%	0.10%
Mixed race or Multiracial (NH)	x	x	11	38	131	x	x	0.20%	0.71%	2.65%
Hispanic or Latino (any race)	23	15	10	43	48	0.37%	0.27%	0.18%	0.80%	0.97%
Total	6,142	5,644	5,537	5,355	4,949	100.00%	100.00%	100.00%	100.00%	100.00%

=== 2010 census ===
As of the 2010 census, there were 5,355 people, 2,214 households, and 1,516 families living in the county. The population density was 21.3 inhabitants per square mile (8.2/km^{2}). There were 2,459 housing units at an average density of 9.8 per square mile (3.8/km^{2}). The racial makeup of the county was 98.6% white, 0.2% Asian, 0.2% American Indian, 0.2% black or African American, 0.1% from other races, and 0.7% from two or more races. Those of Hispanic or Latino origin made up 0.8% of the population. In terms of ancestry, 26.3% were German, 24.3% were American, 18.0% were English, and 16.2% were Irish.

Of the 2,214 households, 32.0% had children under the age of 18 living with them, 54.7% were married couples living together, 9.1% had a female householder with no husband present, 31.5% were non-families, and 27.3% of all households were made up of individuals. The average household size was 2.40 and the average family size was 2.89. The median age was 42.7 years.

The median income for a household in the county was $49,462 and the median income for a family was $64,412. Males had a median income of $40,781 versus $32,011 for females. The per capita income for the county was $27,530. About 6.5% of families and 9.1% of the population were below the poverty line, including 9.5% of those under age 18 and 10.2% of those age 65 or over.

== Communities ==
=== City ===
- Winchester

=== Town ===
- Naples

=== Villages ===
- Alsey
- Bluffs
- Exeter
- Glasgow
- Manchester

=== Census-designated places ===
- Merritt
- Oxville
- Riggston

=== Unincorporated community ===
- Bloomfield

=== Population ranking ===
The population ranking of the following table is based on the 2020 census of Scott County.

† county seat

Rank	Place	Municipal type	Population (2020 Census)
1	† Winchester	City	1,574
2	Bluffs	Village	618
3	Manchester	Village	265
4	Alsey	Village	195
5	Glasgow	Village	119
6	Naples	Town	100
7	Exeter	Town	87

== Politics ==
United States presidential election results for Scott County, Illinois
Year	Republican		Democratic		Third party(ies)	
Year	No.	%	No.	%	No.	%
1892	1,006	39.73%	1,282	50.63%	244	9.64%
1896	1,261	43.63%	1,598	55.29%	31	1.07%
1900	1,204	42.59%	1,585	56.07%	38	1.34%
1904	1,163	45.47%	1,236	48.32%	159	6.22%
1908	1,101	42.76%	1,376	53.44%	98	3.81%
1912	379	15.41%	1,341	54.53%	739	30.05%
1916	2,126	45.72%	2,457	52.84%	67	1.44%
1920	2,075	52.25%	1,786	44.98%	110	2.77%
1924	2,227	50.49%	1,994	45.21%	190	4.31%
1928	2,601	59.96%	1,730	39.88%	7	0.16%
1932	1,740	36.22%	3,012	62.70%	52	1.08%
1936	2,165	42.14%	2,945	57.32%	28	0.54%
1940	2,585	50.70%	2,492	48.87%	22	0.43%
1944	2,185	53.84%	1,864	45.93%	9	0.22%
1948	1,840	51.28%	1,735	48.36%	13	0.36%
1952	2,298	60.36%	1,506	39.56%	3	0.08%
1956	2,303	60.91%	1,478	39.09%	0	0.00%
1960	2,267	59.44%	1,543	40.46%	4	0.10%
1964	1,627	45.46%	1,952	54.54%	0	0.00%
1968	1,971	55.55%	1,252	35.29%	325	9.16%
1972	2,228	66.00%	1,145	33.92%	3	0.09%
1976	1,789	55.35%	1,424	44.06%	19	0.59%
1980	1,990	65.42%	941	30.93%	111	3.65%
1984	1,976	67.33%	943	32.13%	16	0.55%
1988	1,535	55.02%	1,243	44.55%	12	0.43%
1992	1,132	40.68%	1,057	37.98%	594	21.34%
1996	1,112	43.81%	1,012	39.87%	414	16.31%
2000	1,458	59.05%	954	38.64%	57	2.31%
2004	1,696	64.34%	927	35.17%	13	0.49%
2008	1,455	55.81%	1,090	41.81%	62	2.38%
2012	1,587	61.80%	910	35.44%	71	2.76%
2016	1,966	75.38%	535	20.51%	107	4.10%
2020	2,114	77.07%	572	20.85%	57	2.08%
2024	2,071	79.90%	488	18.83%	33	1.27%

== See also ==
- National Register of Historic Places listings in Scott County
