= Winchester, Illinois =

- City
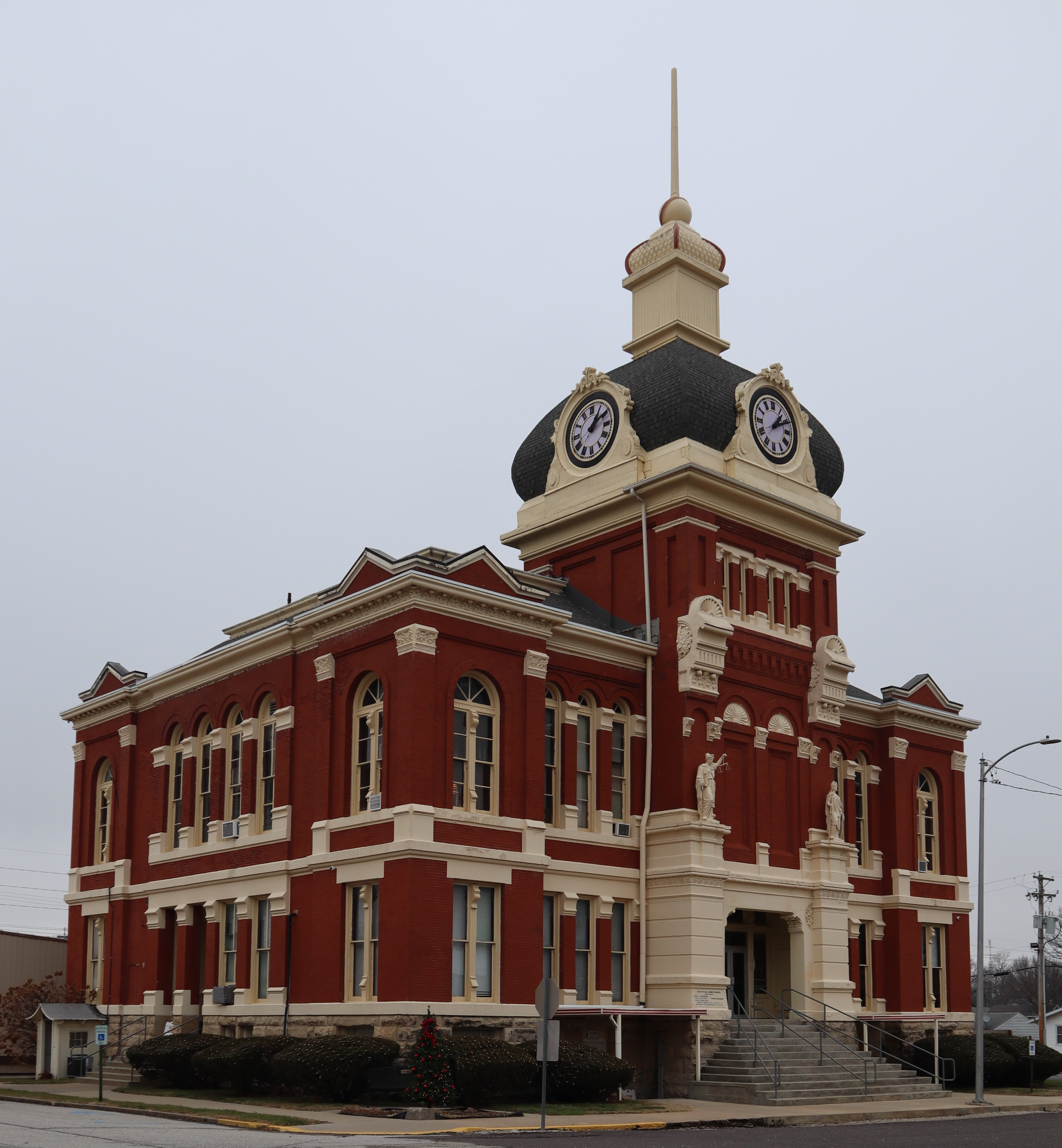
- Scott County Courthouse
- Interactive map of Winchester, Illinois
- Location within Illinois Location within the United States
- Coordinates: 39°37′35″N 90°27′25″W
- Country: United States
- State: Illinois
- County: Scott

Area
  - Total: 1.13 sq mi (2.92 km^{2})
  - Land: 1.13 sq mi (2.92 km^{2})
  - Water: 0 sq mi (0.00 km^{2})
- Elevation: 545 ft (166 m)

Population (2020)
  - Total: 1,574
  - Density: 1,394.6/sq mi (538.45/km^{2})
- Time zone: UTC-6 (CST)
  - Summer (DST): UTC-5 (CDT)
- ZIP code: 62694
- Area code: 217
- FIPS code: 17-82270
- GNIS feature ID: 2397336
- Website: www.winchesteril.com

Winchester is a city in and the county seat of Scott County, Illinois, United States. As of the 2020 census, Winchester had a population of 1,574. Winchester is part of the Jacksonville Micropolitan Statistical Area.

== Geography ==
According to the 2010 census, Winchester has a total area of 1.13 square miles (2.93 km^{2}), all land.

== Demographics ==
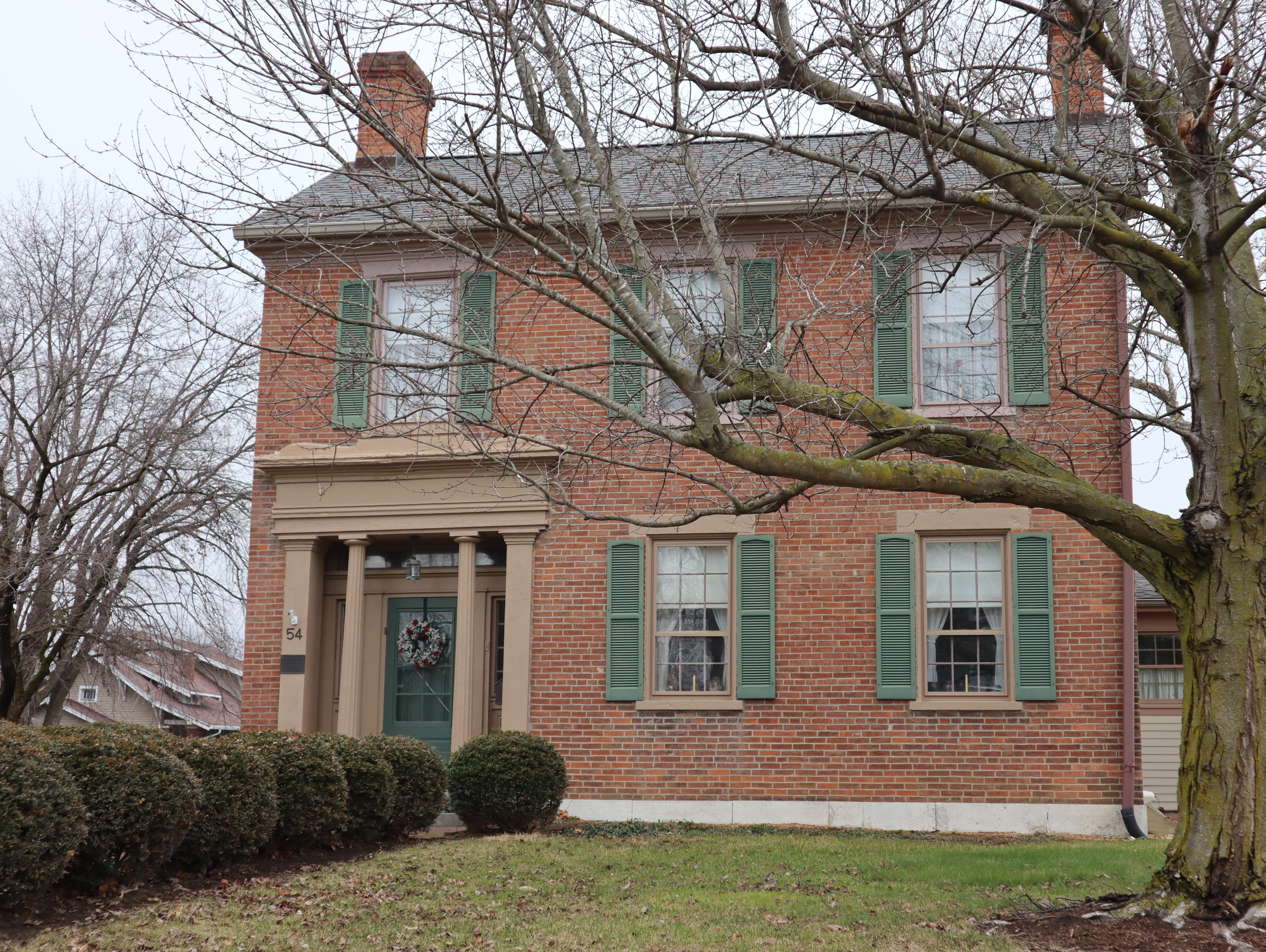
Historic house on Main Street, built about 1842

Historical population
Census	Pop.	Note	%±
1880	1,626		—
1890	1,542		−5.2%
1900	1,711		11.0%
1910	1,639		−4.2%
1920	1,540		−6.0%
1930	1,532		−0.5%
1940	1,651		7.8%
1950	1,591		−3.6%
1960	1,657		4.1%
1970	1,788		7.9%
1980	1,716		−4.0%
1990	1,769		3.1%
2000	1,650		−6.7%
2010	1,593		−3.5%
2020	1,574		−1.2%
U.S. Decennial Census

=== 2020 census ===
As of the 2020 census, Winchester had a population of 1,574. The median age was 41.0 years. 24.7% of residents were under the age of 18 and 19.5% of residents were 65 years of age or older. For every 100 females there were 88.7 males, and for every 100 females age 18 and over there were 88.7 males age 18 and over.

0.0% of residents lived in urban areas, while 100.0% lived in rural areas.

There were 690 households in Winchester, of which 30.1% had children under the age of 18 living in them. Of all households, 43.0% were married-couple households, 17.8% were households with a male householder and no spouse or partner present, and 32.9% were households with a female householder and no spouse or partner present. About 35.2% of all households were made up of individuals and 19.0% had someone living alone who was 65 years of age or older.

There were 762 housing units, of which 9.4% were vacant. The homeowner vacancy rate was 2.0% and the rental vacancy rate was 8.0%.

Racial composition as of the 2020 census
Race	Number	Percent
White	1,518	96.4%
Black or African American	3	0.2%
American Indian and Alaska Native	0	0.0%
Asian	3	0.2%
Native Hawaiian and Other Pacific Islander	0	0.0%
Some other race	1	0.1%
Two or more races	49	3.1%
Hispanic or Latino (of any race)	18	1.1%

=== 2000 census ===
As of the census of 2000, there were 1,650 people, 727 households, and 460 families residing in the city. The population density was 1,551.3 inhabitants per square mile (599.0/km^{2}). There were 778 housing units at an average density of 731.5 per square mile (282.4/km^{2}). The racial makeup of the city was 99.88% White and 0.12% Native American. Hispanic or Latino of any race were 0.18% of the population.

There were 727 households, out of which 31.2% had children under the age of 18 living with them, 49.4% were married couples living together, 11.4% had a female householder with no husband present, and 36.6% were non-families. 34.1% of all households were made up of individuals, and 19.9% had someone living alone who was 65 years of age or older. The average household size was 2.27 and the average family size was 2.92.

In the city, the population was spread out, with 25.0% under the age of 18, 6.4% from 18 to 24, 25.5% from 25 to 44, 21.8% from 45 to 64, and 21.3% who were 65 years of age or older. The median age was 40 years. For every 100 females, there were 85.4 males. For every 100 females age 18 and over, there were 80.8 males.

The median income for a household in the city was $30,938, and the median income for a family was $40,592. Males had a median income of $31,410 versus $20,000 for females. The per capita income for the city was $17,354. About 6.8% of families and 10.4% of the population were below the poverty line, including 12.0% of those under age 18 and 7.4% of those age 65 or over.

== Notable people ==
- Greene Vardiman Black, the father of modern dentistry was born near Winchester. His descendants practiced medicine there through the 1960s.
- Stephen Douglas moved to Winchester when he was 20 years old in 1833 to teach school. He had forty students who paid him $3 each per quarter. There is a statue of him in the town square.
- George O'Donnell, pitcher for the Pittsburgh Pirates; born in Winchester
- Clyde Summers, labor lawyer and law professor at the Yale Law School and University of Pennsylvania Law School, subject of In re Summers
- Larry Breeding, television actor born and raised in Winchester
