= National Register of Historic Places listings in Morgan County, Illinois =

Location of Morgan County in Illinois

This is a list of the National Register of Historic Places listings in Morgan County, Illinois.

This is intended to be a complete list of the properties and districts on the National Register of Historic Places in Morgan County, Illinois, United States. Latitude and longitude coordinates are provided for many National Register properties and districts; these locations may be seen together in a map.

There are 10 properties and districts listed on the National Register in the county.

This National Park Service list is complete through NPS recent listings posted December 12, 2025.

== Current listings ==
	Name on the Register	Image	Date listed	Location	City or town	Description
1	Ayers Bank Building	Ayers Bank Building	November 20, 1986 (#86003178)	200 W. State St. 39°44′04″N 90°13′49″W	Jacksonville	
2	Beecher Hall, Illinois College	Beecher Hall, Illinois College	April 8, 1974 (#74000769)	Illinois College campus 39°43′52″N 90°14′55″W	Jacksonville	
3	Joseph Duncan House	Joseph Duncan House	November 5, 1971 (#71000294)	4 Duncan Pl. 39°44′00″N 90°14′57″W	Jacksonville	
4	Gen. Benjamin Henry Grierson House	Gen. Benjamin Henry Grierson House	November 20, 1980 (#80001400)	852 E. State St. 39°44′04″N 90°12′45″W	Jacksonville	
5	Jacksonville Downtown Historic District	Jacksonville Downtown Historic District	September 14, 2018 (#100002915)	Roughly bounded by Court, West, Morgan, Sandy, Main, Mauvaisterre, and State Sts. 39°44′04″N 90°13′48″W	Jacksonville	
6	Jacksonville Historic District	Jacksonville Historic District	June 9, 1978 (#78001178)	Roughly bounded by Anna, Mound, Finley, Dayton, Lafayette, and Church Sts.; also roughly bounded by Grand, Elm, Dunlap, and Chambers; 39°44′15″N 90°14′25″W	Jacksonville	Second set of addresses represents a boundary increase of August 25, 2014
7	Jacksonville Labor Temple	Jacksonville Labor Temple	November 13, 1980 (#80004524)	228 S. Mauvaisterre St. 39°43′58″N 90°13′41″W	Jacksonville	
8	Jacksonville Public Library	Jacksonville Public Library	August 24, 2000 (#00000953)	201 W. College Ave. 39°43′56″N 90°13′49″W	Jacksonville	
9	Morgan County Courthouse	Morgan County Courthouse	November 19, 1986 (#86003167)	300 W. State St. 39°44′04″N 90°13′54″W	Jacksonville	
10	Woodlawn Farm	Woodlawn Farm	June 6, 2007 (#07000146)	1463 Gerkie Ln. 39°44′09″N 90°08′22″W	Jacksonville	

== Former listings ==
	Name on the Register	Image	Date listed	Date removed	Location	City or town	Description
1	Jacksonville State Hospital Main Building		April 24, 1975 (#75000669)	April 18, 1984	1201 S. Main St.	Jacksonville	Demolished.

== See also ==
- List of National Historic Landmarks in Illinois
- National Register of Historic Places listings in Illinois
