= Meredosia Lake =

Riparian lake in Cass and Morgan Counties, Illinois

- Location within Illinois Location within the United States
- Location: Cass / Morgan counties, Illinois, United States
- Coordinates: 39°52′30″N 90°33′11″W
- Basin countries: United States
- Surface elevation: 423 ft (129 m)

Meredosia Lake is a riparian lake that forms part of the valley of the Illinois River. It is located in Cass and Morgan Counties, Illinois. Much of the floodplain isthmus between Lake Meredosia and the river is known as Meredosia Island, and much of the quasi-island and associated lakebed are part of the Meredosia National Wildlife Refuge.

== Glacial relic ==
The drainage, by sudden flood, of a sizable lake of glacial meltwater upon the conclusion of the Wisconsin glacial period left the lower Illinois River valley, including the Meredosia Lake area, as a broad ribbon of relatively impermeable clay and silt bordered by low bluffs.

During the post-glacial springtimes, as the climate of Illinois grew warmer, floods caused by snowmelt tended to fill sections of the valley faster than it could be drained during the rest of the year. Eventually the Illinois River became a braided, slow-moving alluvial river bordered by a string of riverside lakes and wetlands. Meredosia Lake is one of these backwater lakes.

== Backwater lake and fish ==
During prehistoric and early historic times, backwater lakes bordering the Illinois, such as Meredosia Lake, became highly productive areas for fishing and waterfowling. The early Illinois River frontier town of Meredosia, Illinois, which is adjacent to the lake, grew through utilization of lakebed resources. Commercial fishing in Lake Meredosia continued at a high level until 1900–1910, when toxic waste was injected into the Illinois River through the newly dug Chicago Sanitary and Ship Canal.

== Today ==
Meredosia Lake is a local favorite for recreation, with a boat ramp located north of Meredosia. The lake is filled with silt and very shallow, and boaters primarily use the lake for waterfowling. The Illinois Department of Natural Resources manages the lake for the hunting of ducks, Canada geese, snow geese, and teal.
