= Jacksonville Historic District =

Jacksonville Historic District may refer to:

- Downtown Jacksonville Historic District (Jacksonville, Alabama), listed on the National Register of Historic Places in Calhoun County, Alabama
- Jacksonville Historic District (Jacksonville, Illinois), listed on the NRHP in Morgan County, Illinois
- Jacksonville Historic District (Jacksonville, Oregon), a U.S. National Historic Landmark in Oregon
