= Morgan County, Illinois =

County in Illinois, United States

- County
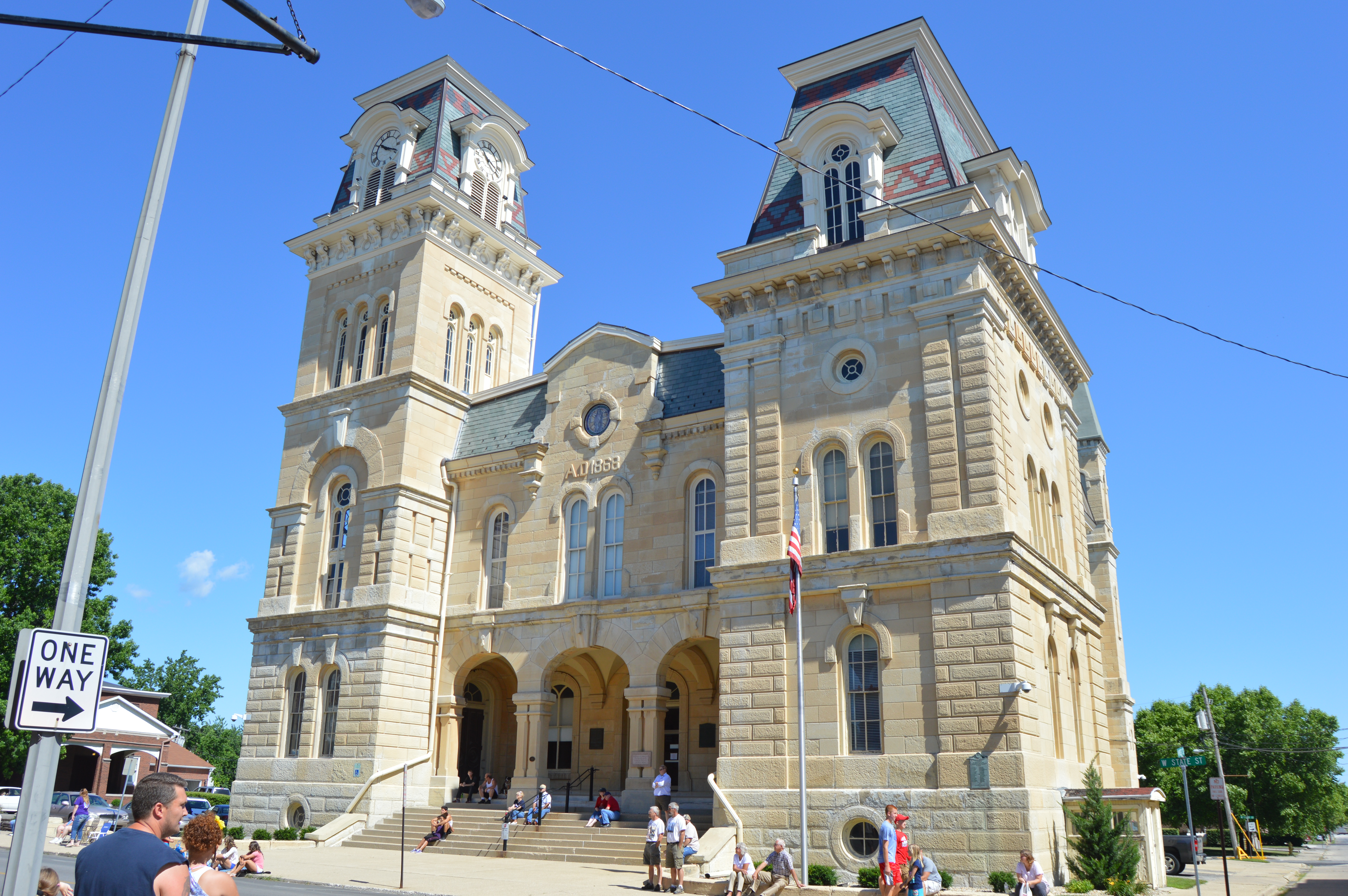
- Morgan County Courthouse, Jacksonville

- Location within the U.S. state of Illinois
- Coordinates: 39°43′N 90°12′W
- Country: United States
- State: Illinois
- Founded: 1823
- Named for: Daniel Morgan
- Seat: Jacksonville
- Largest city: Jacksonville

Area
  - Total: 572 sq mi (1,480 km^{2})
  - Land: 569 sq mi (1,470 km^{2})
  - Water: 3.5 sq mi (9.1 km^{2}) 0.6%

Population (2020)
  - Total: 32,915
  - Estimate (2025): 32,515 ▼
  - Density: 57.8/sq mi (22.3/km^{2})
- Time zone: UTC−6 (Central)
  - Summer (DST): UTC−5 (CDT)
- Congressional district: 15th

Morgan County is a county located in the U.S. state of Illinois. According to the 2020 census, it had a population of 32,915. Its county seat is Jacksonville.

Morgan County is part of the Jacksonville, IL Micropolitan Statistical Area, which is also included in the Springfield–Jacksonville–Lincoln, IL Combined Statistical Area.

== History ==
Morgan County was formed in 1823 out of Greene and Sangamon Counties. It was named in honor of General Daniel Morgan, who defeated the British at the Battle of Cowpens in the American Revolutionary War. General Morgan was serving under General Nathanael Greene at Cowpens. Jacksonville was established by European Americans on a 160-acre tract of land in the center of Morgan County in 1825, two years after the county was founded. The founders of Jacksonville, Illinois consisted entirely of settlers from New England. These so-called Yankee settlers were descended from the English Puritans who settled New England in the 1600s. They were part of a wave of New England farmers who headed west into what was then the wilds of the Northwest Territory during the early 1800s. Most of them arrived as a result of the completion of the Erie Canal and the end of the Black Hawk War. The Yankee migration to Illinois was a result of several factors, one of which was the overpopulation of New England. The old stock Yankee population had large families, often bearing up to ten children in one household. Most people were expected to have their own piece of land to farm, and due to the massive and nonstop population boom, land in New England became scarce as every son claimed his own farmstead. As a result, there was not enough land for every family to have a self-sustaining farm, and Yankee settlers began leaving New England for the Midwestern United States. When they arrived in what is now Jacksonville there was nothing but dense virgin forest and wild prairie, the New Englanders laid out farms, constructed roads, erected government buildings and established post routes. They brought with them many of their Yankee New England values, such as a passion for education, establishing many schools as well as staunch support for abolitionism. They were mostly members of the Congregationalist Church though some were Episcopalian. Due to the second Great Awakening some of them had converted to Methodism and Presbyterianism while some others became Baptist, before moving to what is now Jacksonville. Jacksonville, like some other parts of Illinois, would be culturally very continuous with early New England culture for most of its early history.

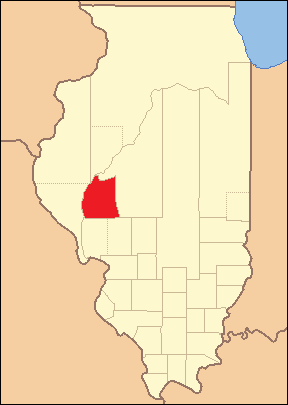
Morgan County from the time of its creation to 1837

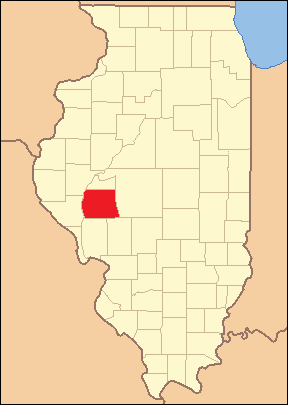
Morgan County between 1837 and 1839, when Scott County was split off

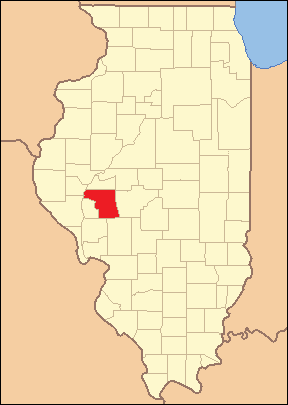
Morgan County between 1839 and 1845

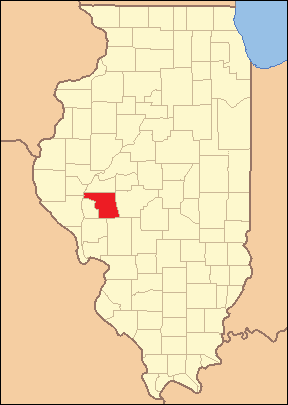
Morgan County in 1845, when its border with Cass County was moved southward, bringing both to their present borders

== Geography ==
According to the US Census Bureau, the county has a total area of 572 square miles (1,480 km^{2}), of which 569 square miles (1,470 km^{2}) is land and 3.5 square miles (9.1 km^{2}) (0.6%) is water.

The 90th Meridian of Longitude goes through Morgan County, as seen on a road sign at mile 78 of I-72.

=== Climate and weather ===
Jacksonville, Illinois

Climate chart (precipitation, max. and min. temperature)
J	F	M	A	M	J	J	A	S	O	N	D
1.4 34 15	1.7 40 19	3.2 52 29	3.8 64 39	4.9 74 49	4.4 83 59	3.9 87 63	3.4 85 60	3.5 79 52	2.6 68 41	3.5 52 31	2.5 39 20
- █ Average max. and min. temperatures in °F
- █ Precipitation totals in inches
- Source: The Weather Channel
Metric conversion
J	F	M	A	M	J	J	A	S	O	N	D
34 1 −9	43 4 −7	81 11 −2	96 18 4	123 23 9	111 28 15	98 31 17	85 29 16	88 26 11	66 20 5	88 11 −1	65 4 −7
- █ Average max. and min. temperatures in °C
- █ Precipitation totals in mm

Average temperatures in the county seat of Jacksonville range from a low of 15 °F (−9 °C) in January to a high of 87 °F (31 °C) in July; a record low of −28 °F (−33 °C) was recorded in February 1934 and a record high of 114 °F (46 °C) was recorded in July 1954. Average monthly precipitation ranged from 1.35 inches (34 mm) in January to 4.86 inches (123 mm) in May.

=== Major highways ===
- I-72
- US 36
- US 67
- IL 78
- IL 100
- IL 104
- IL 111
- IL 267 – former US 67

=== Adjacent counties ===
- Cass County – north
- Sangamon County – east
- Macoupin County – southeast
- Greene County – south
- Pike County – west
- Scott County – southwest
- Brown County – northwest

=== National protected area ===
- Meredosia National Wildlife Refuge (part)

== Demographics ==
Historical population
Census	Pop.	Note	%±
1830	12,714		—
1840	19,547		53.7%
1850	16,064		−17.8%
1860	22,112		37.6%
1870	28,463		28.7%
1880	31,514		10.7%
1890	32,636		3.6%
1900	35,006		7.3%
1910	34,420		−1.7%
1920	33,567		−2.5%
1930	34,240		2.0%
1940	36,378		6.2%
1950	35,568		−2.2%
1960	36,571		2.8%
1970	36,174		−1.1%
1980	37,502		3.7%
1990	36,397		−2.9%
2000	36,616		0.6%
2010	35,547		−2.9%
2020	32,915		−7.4%
2025 (est.)	32,515	▼	−1.2%
US Decennial Census; 1790–1960 1900–1990; 1990–2000 2010

=== 2020 census ===
As of the 2020 census, the county had a population of 32,915. The median age was 42.5 years. 19.7% of residents were under the age of 18 and 20.8% of residents were 65 years of age or older. For every 100 females there were 101.7 males, and for every 100 females age 18 and over there were 100.1 males age 18 and over.

The racial makeup of the county was 87.5% White, 6.0% Black or African American, 0.2% American Indian and Alaska Native, 0.8% Asian, <0.1% Native Hawaiian and Pacific Islander, 1.1% from some other race, and 4.3% from two or more races. Hispanic or Latino residents of any race comprised 2.5% of the population.

63.8% of residents lived in urban areas, while 36.2% lived in rural areas.

There were 13,511 households in the county, of which 25.8% had children under the age of 18 living in them. Of all households, 43.6% were married-couple households, 19.6% were households with a male householder and no spouse or partner present, and 28.8% were households with a female householder and no spouse or partner present. About 32.7% of all households were made up of individuals and 15.0% had someone living alone who was 65 years of age or older.

There were 15,031 housing units, of which 10.1% were vacant. Among occupied housing units, 69.8% were owner-occupied and 30.2% were renter-occupied. The homeowner vacancy rate was 2.1% and the rental vacancy rate was 11.9%.

=== Racial and ethnic composition ===
Morgan County, Illinois – Racial and ethnic composition Note: the US Census treats Hispanic/Latino as an ethnic category. This table excludes Latinos from the racial categories and assigns them to a separate category. Hispanics/Latinos may be of any race.
Race / Ethnicity (NH = Non-Hispanic)	Pop 1980	Pop 1990	Pop 2000	Pop 2010	Pop 2020	% 1980	% 1990	% 2000	% 2010	% 2020
White alone (NH)	35,980	34,382	33,589	31,937	28,489	95.94%	94.46%	91.73%	89.84%	86.55%
Black or African American alone (NH)	1,103	1,499	1,950	2,104	1,961	2.94%	4.12%	5.33%	5.92%	5.96%
Native American or Alaska Native alone (NH)	43	46	59	67	54	0.11%	0.13%	0.16%	0.19%	0.16%
Asian alone (NH)	90	124	167	163	266	0.24%	0.34%	0.46%	0.46%	0.81%
Native Hawaiian or Pacific Islander alone (NH)	x	x	2	6	16	x	x	0.01%	0.02%	0.05%
Other race alone (NH)	69	60	34	42	84	0.18%	0.16%	0.09%	0.12%	0.26%
Mixed race or Multiracial (NH)	x	x	319	516	1,207	x	x	0.87%	1.45%	3.67%
Hispanic or Latino (any race)	217	286	496	712	838	0.58%	0.79%	1.35%	2.00%	2.55%
Total	37,502	36,397	36,616	35,547	32,915	100.00%	100.00%	100.00%	100.00%	100.00%

=== 2010 census ===
As of the 2010 United States census, there were 35,547 people, 14,104 households, and 8,851 families residing in the county. The population density was 62.5 inhabitants per square mile (24.1/km^{2}). There were 15,515 housing units at an average density of 27.3 per square mile (10.5/km^{2}). The racial makeup of the county was 90.9% white, 6.0% black or African American, 0.5% Asian, 0.2% American Indian, 0.8% from other races, and 1.6% from two or more races. Those of Hispanic or Latino origin made up 2.0% of the population. In terms of ancestry, 25.9% were German, 21.6% were American, 15.4% were Irish, and 14.5% were English. Those citing American ancestry in Morgan County are of overwhelmingly English extraction, in many cases going back to colonial New England, however most English Americans identify simply as having American ancestry because their roots have been in North America for so long, in many cases since the early sixteen hundreds.

Of the 14,104 households, 28.3% had children under the age of 18 living with them, 47.4% were married couples living together, 11.2% had a female householder with no husband present, 37.2% were non-families, and 31.5% of all households were made up of individuals. The average household size was 2.30 and the average family size was 2.86. The median age was 40.8 years.

The median income for a household in the county was $44,645 and the median income for a family was $59,185. Males had a median income of $43,609 versus $29,893 for females. The per capita income for the county was $23,244. About 11.2% of families and 16.4% of the population were below the poverty line, including 25.8% of those under age 18 and 7.5% of those age 65 or over.

== Communities ==
=== Cities ===
- Jacksonville (seat)
- Waverly

=== Villages ===
- Chapin
- Concord
- Franklin
- Lynnville
- Meredosia
- Murrayville
- South Jacksonville
- Woodson

=== Census-designated places ===
- Alexander
- Literberry

=== Unincorporated communities ===
- Arcadia
- Arnold
- Markham
- Pisgah

== Politics ==
Morgan County has been reliably Republican from its beginning; the Democratic nominee has gained a plurality only 19% of the time (6 of 32 elections).

United States presidential election results for Morgan County, Illinois
Year	Republican		Democratic		Third party(ies)	
Year	No.	%	No.	%	No.	%
1892	3,471	43.68%	4,006	50.41%	470	5.91%
1896	4,317	49.28%	4,323	49.34%	121	1.38%
1900	4,341	48.66%	4,321	48.43%	260	2.91%
1904	4,248	51.65%	3,343	40.64%	634	7.71%
1908	4,019	48.06%	3,993	47.75%	351	4.20%
1912	2,090	27.57%	3,648	48.11%	1,844	24.32%
1916	7,536	50.25%	7,104	47.37%	358	2.39%
1920	8,169	62.87%	4,447	34.23%	377	2.90%
1924	8,223	55.40%	5,721	38.54%	900	6.06%
1928	10,192	63.52%	5,805	36.18%	49	0.31%
1932	7,787	42.95%	10,170	56.09%	173	0.95%
1936	8,844	47.02%	9,800	52.10%	167	0.89%
1940	10,137	52.57%	9,082	47.10%	64	0.33%
1944	8,923	56.01%	6,965	43.72%	42	0.26%
1948	8,398	55.05%	6,798	44.56%	59	0.39%
1952	10,405	61.04%	6,637	38.94%	4	0.02%
1956	10,262	61.82%	6,327	38.11%	11	0.07%
1960	9,791	57.38%	7,259	42.54%	12	0.07%
1964	7,240	43.95%	9,235	56.05%	0	0.00%
1968	8,902	54.52%	6,281	38.47%	1,144	7.01%
1972	11,103	66.13%	5,674	33.80%	12	0.07%
1976	8,885	53.88%	7,403	44.90%	201	1.22%
1980	10,406	61.22%	5,483	32.26%	1,108	6.52%
1984	10,683	66.37%	5,361	33.30%	53	0.33%
1988	8,808	59.17%	6,032	40.52%	46	0.31%
1992	6,566	40.29%	6,351	38.97%	3,380	20.74%
1996	6,352	44.61%	6,150	43.19%	1,736	12.19%
2000	8,058	56.22%	5,899	41.15%	377	2.63%
2004	9,392	61.87%	5,650	37.22%	138	0.91%
2008	7,591	49.31%	7,467	48.51%	336	2.18%
2012	7,972	56.37%	5,806	41.06%	364	2.57%
2016	9,076	61.32%	4,696	31.73%	1,028	6.95%
2020	9,950	64.89%	5,076	33.11%	307	2.00%
2024	9,607	65.46%	4,848	33.03%	222	1.51%

== Education ==
Here is a list of school districts with any territory in the county (all are full K-12 school districts), no matter how slight, even if the schools and/or administrative offices are located in other counties:

- A-C Central Community Unit School District 262
- Community Unit School District 16
- Franklin Community Unit School District 1
- Greenfield Community Unit School District 10
- Jacksonville School District 117
- Meredosia-Chambersburg Community Unit School District 11
- Pleasant Plains Community Unit School District 8
- Scott-Morgan Consolidated Unit School District 2
- Triopia Community Unit School District 27
- Virginia Community Unit School District 64
- Waverly Community Unit School District 6
- Winchester Community Unit School District 1

Additionally the following state-operated schools are in Morgan County:

- Illinois School for the Deaf
- Illinois School for the Visually Impaired (School for the Blind)

Private schools:

- Routt Catholic High School

Tertiary:

- Illinois College
- Lincoln Land Community College Jacksonville Outreach Center
- MacMurray College (closed)

== See also ==
- National Register of Historic Places listings in Morgan County, Illinois
