= Arcadia, Illinois =

- Unincorporated community
- Location within Illinois Location within the United States
- Coordinates: 39°50′21″N 90°14′41″W
- Country: United States
- State: Illinois
- County: Morgan
- Elevation: 604 ft (184 m)
- Time zone: UTC-6 (Central (CST))
  - Summer (DST): UTC-5 (CDT)
- Area code: 217
- GNIS feature ID: 403589

Arcadia is an unincorporated community in Morgan County, Illinois, United States. Arcadia is 7.3 miles (11.7 km) north of Jacksonville.
