= Pisgah, Illinois =

- Unincorporated community
- Location within Illinois Location within the United States
- Coordinates: 39°40′07″N 90°07′32″W
- Country: United States
- State: Illinois
- County: Morgan
- Elevation: 673 ft (205 m)
- Time zone: UTC-6 (Central (CST))
  - Summer (DST): UTC-5 (CDT)
- Area code: 217
- GNIS feature ID: 423068

Pisgah is an unincorporated community in Morgan County in the U.S. state of Illinois, southeast of Jacksonville. Pisgah is located on Illinois Route 104.
