= Martha Capps Oliver =

American poet

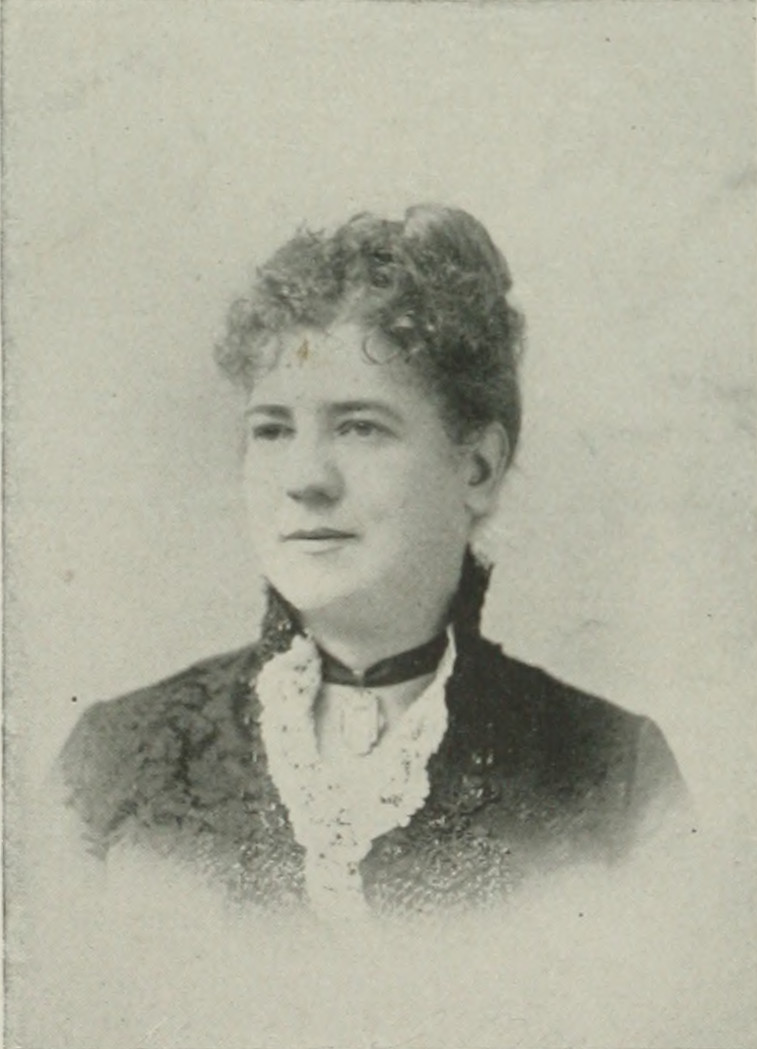
- Photo in A Woman of the Century
- Born: Martha W. Capps; August 27, 1845; Jacksonville, Illinois, U.S.
- Died: August 15, 1917 (aged 71); Jacksonville, Illinois
- Resting place: Diamond Grove Cemetery, Jacksonville, Illinois
- Education: Illinois Female College
- Occupations: Poet, hymwriter
- Spouse: William Archibald Oliver
- Writing career
- Language: English

Martha Capps Oliver (née, Capps; pen name, Martha C. Oliver; August 27, 1845 – August 15, 1917) was an American poet and hymnwriter from Illinois. She was the author of A Year of Sacred Song (1895), A Year's Good Wishes (1895), Round the Year with the Poets (1900), The Far West, Easter Legend, and Christmas Legend. Oliver also wrote several hundred Easter and Christmas booklets and poems, numerous songs, hymns, anthems, and cantatas.

== Early life and education ==
Martha W. Capps was born in Jacksonville, Illinois, on August 27, 1845. Her father, Joseph Capps (1811-1872), was the son of a Kentucky slave-owner, but was himself an opponent of slavery, and therefore moved to Illinois as slavery was prohibited there. In Illinois, he married Sarah Ann Higgins Reid (1819-1892). Oliver had three older siblings, Stephen, Emma and William, as well as three younger ones, Joseph, Charles, and Effie.

Oliver was educated in the Illinois Female College, where she took high rank in her studies, early showing a talent for composition. From her father, she inherited an aptitude for versification and a temperament that was quick to receive impressions.

== Career ==
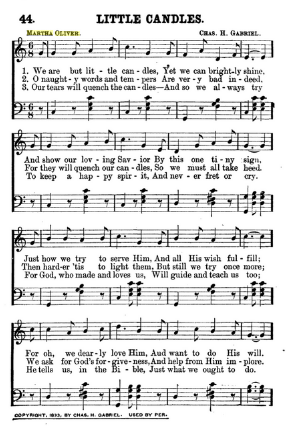
"Little Candles", lyrics by Martha Oliver, score by Charles H. Gabriel

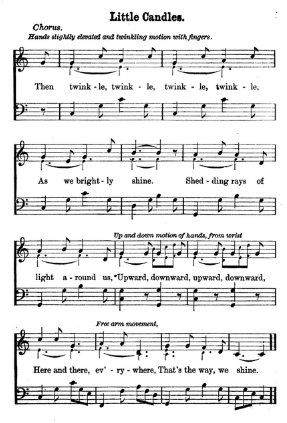
"Little Candles" (chorus), lyrics by Martha Oliver, score by Charles H. Gabriel

In Morgan, Illinois, on December 28, 1865, she married William Archibald Oliver (1841-1904).

Some of her verses soon found their way into print. They met with such appreciation that she finally began to write for publication. A number of her poems were used in England for illustrated booklets. As a writer, she was quite as kindly received there as in America. In collaboration with Ida Scott Taylor McKinney, she published several juvenile books in verse, entitled The Story of Columbus, In Slavery Days, and The Far West. She also gave some attention to sacred songs and hymn writing.

== Personal life ==
Oliver was an active church member. She died August 15, 1917, in Jacksonville, Illinois and was buried at Diamond Grove Cemetery in that city.

== Selected works ==
=== By Martha Capps Oliver ===
- A year of sacred song : with selections in prose from sources old and new, 1895
- Round the Year with the Poets: A Compilation of Nature Poems, 1900

=== By Martha C. Oliver ===
- "Keep Your Covenant With Jesus", (hymn; lyrics by Martha C. Oliver; composer, W. H. Doane, 1883)
- A year's good wishes in prose and poetry, 1895
- The Story of Columbus Told in Rhyme (Ida Scott Taylor and Martha C. Oliver, illustrated by A. Melrose; 1890)
- In Slavery Days
- The Far West
