= WEAI =

WEAI may refer to:

- WEAI, former call sign of WHCU (870 AM), a commercial radio station in Ithaca, New York, United States
- WEAI (FM), a radio station (107.1 FM) licensed to Lynnville, Illinois, United States
- Weatherhead East Asian Institute, a community of scholars at Columbia University
- Western Economic Association International, an academic society for research in economics
