= Jacksonville High School (Illinois) =

Location
- 1211 North Diamond Street; Jacksonville, Illinois 62650; United States
- Coordinates: 39°45′02″N 90°14′24″W

Information
- Type: Public high school
- School district: JSD 117
- Superintendent: Steve Ptacek
- Principal: Joey Dion
- Teaching staff: 72.00 (on an FTE basis)
- Grades: 9–12
- Enrollment: 894 (2023–2024)
- Student to teacher ratio: 12.42
- Colors: Crimson; Black
- Athletics conference: Central State Eight Conference
- Team name: Crimsons
- Yearbook: Crimson J
- Website: jhs.jsd117.org

Jacksonville High School (JHS) is a public, coeducational secondary school in Jacksonville, Morgan County, Illinois. It is the sole high school serving Jacksonville School District 117. The school's principal is Joey Dion.

== Demographics ==
The demographic breakdown of the 913 students enrolled in 2021–22 was:

- Male – 54.9%
- Female – 45.1%
- Asian – 0.9%
- Black – 9.2%
- Hispanic – 3.2%
- Native Hawaiian/Pacific Islander – 0.1%
- White – 80.0%
- Multiracial – 8.7%

Additionally, 430 students (47.1%) were eligible for reduced-price or free lunch.

== See also ==
- List of high schools in Illinois
- Illinois College
- Routt Catholic High School
