= Routt =

Routt may refer to:

Places

In the United States:

- Routt, Louisville, Kentucky
- Routt County, Colorado

People

- Joe Routt
- John Long Routt
- Stanford Routt

School

- Routt Catholic High School
