= Arnold, Morgan County, Illinois =

Arnold, Illinois
- Unincorporated community
- Location within Illinois Location within the United States
- Coordinates: 39°43′16″N 90°08′42″W
- Country: United States
- State: Illinois
- County: Morgan
- Elevation: 640 ft (200 m)
- Time zone: UTC-6 (Central (CST))
  - Summer (DST): UTC-5 (CDT)
- Area code: 217
- GNIS feature ID: 422415

Arnold is an unincorporated community in Morgan County, Illinois, United States. Arnold is 4.5 miles (7.2 km) east-southeast of Jacksonville.
