= Literberry, Illinois =

- Census-designated place
- Location within Illinois Location within the United States
- Coordinates: 39°51′15″N 90°11′58″W
- Country: United States
- State: Illinois
- County: Morgan

Area
  - Total: 0.81 sq mi (2.10 km^{2})
  - Land: 0.81 sq mi (2.10 km^{2})
  - Water: 0 sq mi (0.00 km^{2})
- Elevation: 600 ft (180 m)

Population (2020)
  - Total: 71
  - Density: 87.5/sq mi (33.78/km^{2})
- Time zone: UTC-6 (Central (CST))
  - Summer (DST): UTC-5 (CDT)
- ZIP code: 62660
- Area code: 217
- GNIS feature ID: 2804094

Literberry is an unincorporated community and census-designated place (CDP) in Morgan County, Illinois, United States. It is 8 miles (13 km) north of Jacksonville, the county seat. Literberry formerly had a post office with ZIP code 62660. The community became a CDP prior to the 2020 census, at which time it had a population of 71.

An F4 tornado devastated Literberry on May 18, 1883, killing 12 people.

== Demographics ==
Historical population
Census	Pop.	Note	%±
2020	71		—
U.S. Decennial Census

Literberry first appeared as a census designated place in the 2020 U.S. census.
