= Henry Petroski =

American engineer and academic (1942–2023)

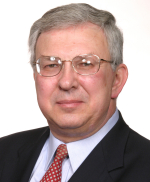
- Born: February 6, 1942; New York City, U.S.
- Died: June 14, 2023 (aged 81); Durham, North Carolina, U.S.
- Education: Manhattan College (B.S., 1963); University of Illinois at Urbana-Champaign (Ph.D. in Theoretical and Applied Mechanics, 1968)
- Occupations: Engineer, professor and author
- Spouse: Catherine Petroski
- Children: Karen Petroski, Stephen Petroski
- Parent(s): Henry and Victoria Petroski

Henry Petroski (February 6, 1942 – June 14, 2023) was an American engineer specializing in failure analysis. A professor both of civil engineering and history at Duke University, he was also a prolific author. Petroski wrote over a dozen books – beginning with To Engineer is Human: The Role of Failure in Successful Design (1985) and including a number of titles detailing the industrial design history of common, everyday objects, such as pencils, paper clips, toothpicks, and silverware. His first book was made into the film When Engineering Fails. He was a frequent lecturer and a columnist for the magazines American Scientist and Prism.

== Life and education ==
Petroski was born in Brooklyn, New York, and was raised in Park Slope and Cambria Heights, Queens. In 1963, he received his bachelor's degree from Manhattan College. He graduated with his PhD in Theoretical and Applied Mechanics from the University of Illinois at Urbana-Champaign in 1968.

== Career ==
Before beginning his work at Duke in 1980, Petroski worked at the University of Texas at Austin from 1968–74 and for the Argonne National Laboratory from 1975–80. Petroski was the Aleksandar S. Vesic Professor of Civil Engineering and a professor of history at Duke University.

In 2004, Petroski was appointed to the United States Nuclear Waste Technical Review Board and was reappointed in 2008.

Petroski had received honorary degrees from Clarkson University, Trinity College, Valparaiso University and Manhattan College. He was registered professional engineer in Texas, a Distinguished Member of the American Society of Civil Engineers, and a member of the American Academy of Arts and Sciences, the American Philosophical Society and the National Academy of Engineering.

Petroski was honored with the 2014 John P. McGovern Award for Science.

Petroski died from cancer in Durham, North Carolina on June 14, 2023, at the age of 81.

== Published works ==
Books

Henry Petroski talks about The Essential Engineer on Bookbits radio.

- To Engineer Is Human: The Role of Failure in Successful Design (1985), ISBN 978-0-679-73416-1
- Beyond Engineering: Essays and Other Attempts to Figure without Equations (1986), ISBN 978-0-312-07785-3
- The Pencil: A History of Design and Circumstance (1990), ISBN 978-0-679-73415-4
- The Evolution of Useful Things (1992), ISBN 978-0-679-74039-1
- Design Paradigms: Case Histories of Error and Judgment in Engineering (1994), ISBN 978-0-521-46649-3
- Engineers of Dreams: Great Bridge Builders and The Spanning of America (1995), ISBN 978-0-679-76021-4
- Invention by Design: How Engineers Get from Thought to Thing (1996), ISBN 978-0-674-46368-4
- Remaking the World: Adventures in Engineering (1997), ISBN 978-0-375-70024-8
- The Book on the Bookshelf (1999), ISBN 978-0-375-70639-4
- Paperboy: Confessions of a Future Engineer (2002), ISBN 978-0-375-71898-4
- Small Things Considered: Why There Is No Perfect Design (2003), ISBN 978-1-4000-3293-8
- Pushing the Limits: New Adventures in Engineering (2004), ISBN 978-1-4000-3294-5
- Success Through Failure: The Paradox of Design. (2006), ISBN 978-0-691-13642-4
- The Toothpick: Technology and Culture. (2007), ISBN 978-0-307-27943-9
- The Essential Engineer: Why Science Alone Will Not Solve Our Global Problems. (2010), ISBN 978-0-307-27245-4
- The Engineer's Alphabet: Gleanings from the Softer Side of a Profession. (2011), ISBN 978-1-107-01506-7
- To Forgive Design: Understanding Failure. (2012), ISBN 978-0-674-06584-0
- The House with Sixteen Handmade Doors: A Tale of Architectural Choice and Craftsmanship. (2014), ISBN 978-0-393-24204-1
- The Road Taken: The History and Future of America's Infrastructure. (2016), ISBN 978-1-63286-360-7
- Force: What It Means to Push and Pull, Slip and Grip, Start and Stop. (2022), ISBN 978-0-300-26079-3

Articles

- "Engineering: Scientific Status," in Modern Scientific Evidence, 2002, vol. 3, part 3, pp. 14–54.
- "The Origins, Founding, and Early Years of the American Society of Civil Engineers: A Case Study in Successful Failure Analysis," in American Civil Engineering History: The Pioneering Years, B. G. Dennis, Jr., et al., editors, Proceedings of the Fourth National Congress on Civil Engineering History and Heritage, ASCE Annual Meeting, November 2–6, 2002, pp. 57–66.
- "The Importance of Engineering History," International Engineering History and Heritage: Improving Bridges to ASCE's 150th Anniversary, Jerry R. Rogers and Augustine J. Fredrich, editors. History Congress proceedings, American Society of Civil Engineers, Houston, Texas, October 2001, pp. 1–7.
- "Reference Guide on Engineering Practice and Methods," in Reference Manual on Scientific Evidence, 2nd edition, Washington, D.C.: Federal Judicial Center, 2000. pp. 577–24.
- "The Britannia Tubular Bridge: A Paradigm of Failure-Driven Design," reprinted in Structural and Civil Engineering Design, William Addis, ed. Aldershot, Hampshire: Ashgate Publishing Ltd., 1999, pp. 313–24.
- "Polishing the Gem: A First-Year Design Project," Journal of Engineering Education, October 1998, pp. 445–49.
- "Drink Me, How Americans came to have cup holders in their cars", Slate Magazine, March 15, 2004
- "Stick Figure, The marketing genius who brought us the toothpick", Slate Magazine, Oct. 31, 2007
- "Infrastructure," American Scientist, September–October 2009, pp. 370–74.
- "Bridging the Gap," New York Times Magazine, June 14, 2009, pp. 11–12.
- "Want to Engineer Real Change? Don’t Ask a Scientist," Washington Post, Outlook Section, January 25, 2009, p. B4.
- "Calder as Artist-Engineer: Vectors, Velocities," in Alexander Calder: The Paris Years, 1926–1933, ed. Joan Simon and Brigitte Leal (New York, Paris, and New Haven: Whitney Museum of American Art, Centre Pompidou, and Yale University Press, 2008), pp. 178–83.
- "The Importance of Civil Engineering History," Proceedings, International Civil Engineering History Symposium, Canadian Society for Civil Engineering, Toronto, June 2–4, 2005, pp. 3–8.
- "The Evolution of Useful Things: Success through Failure," Proceedings of the Design History Society Conference on Design and Evolution, Delft, The Netherlands, August 3-September 2, 2006. In CD format.
- "An American Perspective on Telford," The 250th Anniversary of the Birth of Thomas Telford: Collected Papers from a Commemorative Conference Held on 2 July 2007, Royal Society of Edinburgh, pp. 44–46.
- "Foot in Mouth: The Toothpick’s Surprising Debt to the Shoe," Huntington Frontiers, Spring/Summer 2007, pp. 22–24.
- "What’s in a Nametag?" American Scientist, July–August 2007, pp. 304–08.
- "The Paradox of Failure," Los Angeles Times, August 4, 2007, p. A17.
- "Success and Failure: Two Faces of Design," The Bent of Tau Beta Pi, Fall 2007, pp. 27–30.
- "Picky, Picky, Picky," Los Angeles Times, October 30, 2007, p. A23.
- "The Glorious Toothpick," The American, November/December 2007, pp. 76–80.

== Awards and honors ==
- John P. McGovern Award in Science, Cosmos Club Foundation (2014)
- Barnett-Uzgiris Product Safety Design Award, American Society of Mechanical Engineers (2012)
- G. Brooks Earnest Lecture Award, American Society of Civil Engineers, Cleveland Section (2012)
- Honorary Doctor of Engineering degree, Missouri University of Science & Technology (2011)
- Norman Augustine Award for Outstanding Achievement in Engineering Communications, American Association of Engineering Societies (2009)
- Honorary Member, Association of Polish-American Engineers, Polonia Technica (2008)
- Charles S. Barrett Silver Medal, American Society for Materials International, Rocky Mountain Chapter (2008)
- Member, American Philosophical Society (2006; inducted 2008)
- Distinguished Member, American Society of Civil Engineers (2008)
- Pratt School of Engineering Alumni Council Distinguished Service Award (2007)
- Washington Award (2006)
- Tau Beta Pi, Member (2003)
- American Academy of Arts and Sciences, Fellow (2003)
- Honorary Doctor of Pedagogy Degree, Manhattan College (2003)
- Honorary Member, The Moles (2002)
- Fellow, The Institution of Engineers of Ireland (2000)
- Honorary Doctor of Science degree, Valparaiso University (1999)
- Eminent Speaker, Institution of Engineers, Australia, Structural College (1998)
- Tetelman Fellow, Jonathan Edwards College, Yale University (1998)
- Honorary Doctor of Humane Letters degree, Trinity College (Hartford, Conn.) (1997)
- Elected a member of the National Academy of Engineering in 1997 for books, articles, and lectures on engineering and the profession that have reached and influenced a wide range of audiences. (inducted 1997)
- Orthogonal Medal, Graphic Communications Faculty, North Carolina State University (1996)
- Fellow, American Society of Civil Engineers (1996)
- Alumni Honor Award for Distinguished Service in Engineering, College of Engineering, University of Illinois at Urbana-Champaign (1994)
- Civil Engineering History and Heritage Award, American Society of Civil Engineers (1993)
- Outstanding Graduate, School of Engineering Centennial Award, Manhattan College (1992)
- National Lecturer, Sigma Xi (1991–93)
- Ralph Coats Roe Medal, American Society of Mechanical Engineers (1991)
- Fellow, John Simon Guggenheim Foundation (1990–91)
- Honorary Doctor of Science degree, Clarkson University (1990)
- Fellow, National Endowment for the Humanities (1987–88)
- Fellow, National Humanities Center (1987–88)
- Illinois Arts Council Literary Award (1976)
- Sigma Xi (Illinois Chapter) Graduate Student Paper Award, (1968)
- Alfred P. Sloan Foundation Teaching Fellowship (1963–64)
