= School District 117 =

School District 117 may refer to:

- Jacksonville School District 117
- North Palos School District 117
- Community High School District 117
