= MacMurray College =

Private college in Jacksonville, Illinois, US (1846–2020)

Coordinates: 39.7318°N 90.2231°W

- Type: Private college
- Active: 1846–May 2020
- Religious affiliation: United Methodist Church
- President: Beverley Rogers
- Undergraduates: 570
- Location: Jacksonville, Illinois, United States
- Campus: 60 acres; Rural
- Colors: Tartan
- Mascot: Highlander
- Website: https://www.mac.edu
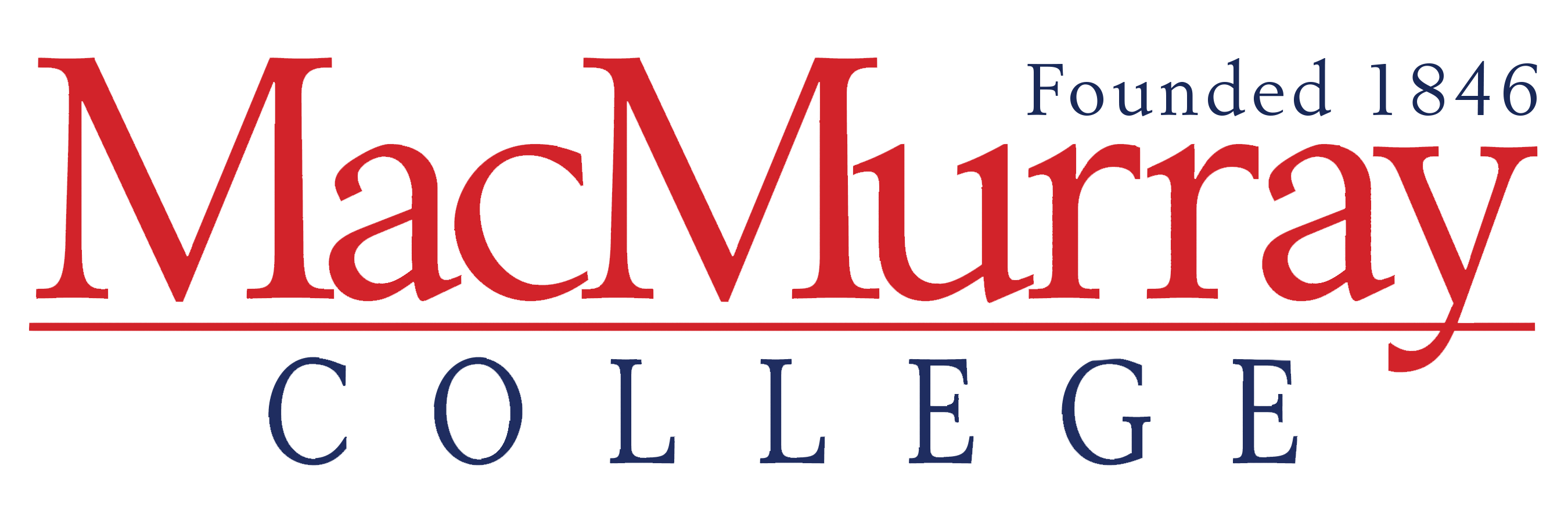

MacMurray College was a private college from 1846 to 2020 in Jacksonville, Illinois, United States. Following its closure, the Illinois Board of Higher Education serves as the custodian of pre-1990 records for the college, while Parchment.com keeps the college's records from 1990 to the 2020 closure.

Its enrollment in fall 2015 was 570. Founded in 1846, the college closed in May 2020.

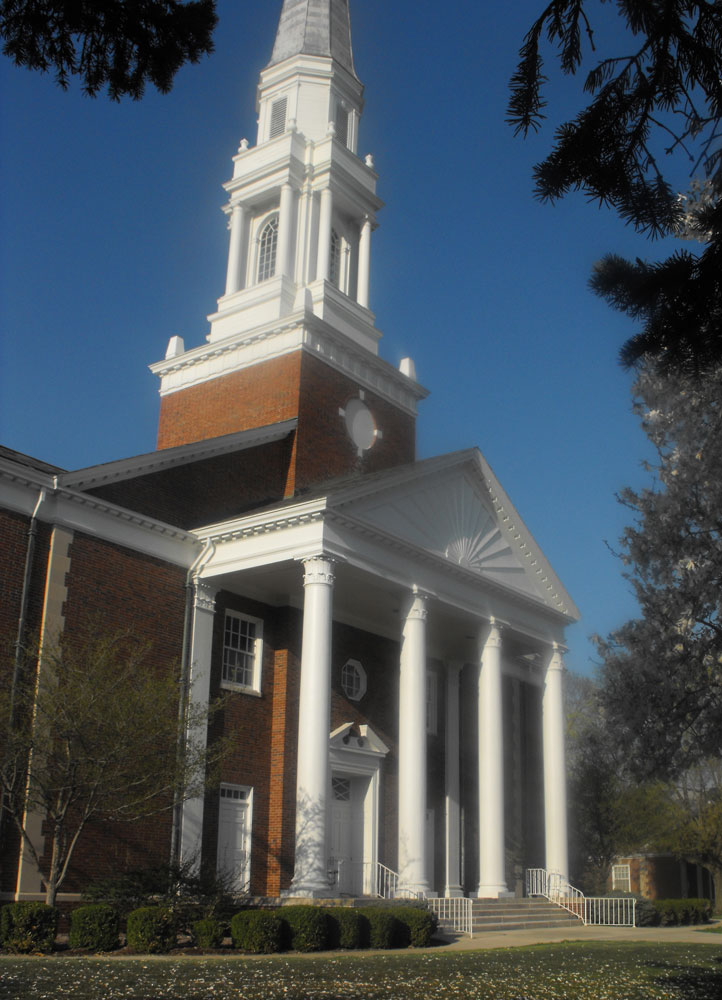
Annie Merner Chapel

== History ==
Although founded in 1846 by a group of Methodist clergymen as the Illinois Conference Female Academy, the first class was not held until 1848. Since its beginnings, the college was affiliated with the United Methodist Church. It was one of the oldest institutions of higher education originally for women in the United States.

The school was renamed the Illinois Conference Female College in 1851, with the name changed again to Illinois Female College in 1863 and Illinois Woman's College in 1899. The name was changed to MacMurray College for Women in 1930 to honor James E. MacMurray, who was an Illinois state senator, president of Acme Steel Corporation in Chicago, and college trustee whose commitment led to a substantial increase in the college's facilities and endowment in the late 1920s and 1930s.

The institution remained an exclusively women's college until 1955, when the trustees established MacMurray College for Men as a coordinate institution. In 1969, the colleges were reorganized into a single co-educational institution. This reorganization helped make a larger enrollment overall. However David Jesse of The Detroit Free Press wrote that for much of its history in the 20th century, the 2000s, and 2010s, the college had an unstable financial situation. Its height of enrollment was more than 1,500 students. In the 1990s it had more students than Illinois College, but later its enrollment and finances declined.

=== Finances and closure ===
MacMurray struggled financially in its final years, having failed the U.S. Department of Education's annual financial responsibility test in 2011, 2012, and 2013. In 2016, it was placed on probation for a two-year period by its accreditor, the Higher Learning Commission, which cited "concerns related to governance, assessment of student learning, institutional resources, planning, and performance improvement."

By the start of the 2018–2019 academic year, MacMurray's finances had worsened and the college was pursuing different strategies to resolve them. Proposals included expanding professional and nontraditional programs and a merger with another institution.

On March 27, 2020, MacMurray announced its plans to close at the end of the spring semester in May 2020. The college cited "declining enrollments, rising competitive costs, and an insufficient endowment," as well as the impact of the COVID-19 pandemic on education.

Arrangements were made to transfer the continuing student body to Blackburn College, Eureka College, Greenville University, Illinois College, McKendree University, Millikin University, and Monmouth College. No severance was provided to faculty and staff, who worked their last day on May 25, 2020.

Following its closure, the Illinois Board of Higher Education serves as the custodian of pre-1990 records for the college, while Parchment.com keeps the college's records from 1990 to the 2020 closure.

In November 2020, the real property of the college was auctioned off in lots, with the $1,500,000 in sales going to pay down the college's debt.

== Reputation and rankings ==
MacMurray College was accredited from 1909 through 2014 by the North Central Association of Colleges and Schools, initially as the Illinois Women's College to 1930, and then as MacMurray. After the North Central Association dissolved in 2014, MacMurray's institutional accreditation was through the Higher Learning Commission.

MacMurray College was ranked 63 of 200 colleges in the 2013 edition of U.S. News Best Colleges in Regional Colleges (Midwest) by U.S. News & World Report.

MacMurray had been ranked a top-20 school in Washington Monthly's ratings of colleges's "contribution to the public good", placing number 14 in the nation in 2011 and number 18 in 2013 among baccalaureate colleges, before falling to number 80 in 2014 due to septic issues.

== Academics ==
In the 2013–14 academic year, MacMurray offered a 26-major, 16-minor liberal arts curriculum with associate, bachelor, master and doctoral degrees. The school reinforces the liberal arts with an emphasis on professional preparation through academic majors that are career-focused. Some of the college's top majors include nursing, criminal justice, homeland security, deaf and hard-of-hearing education, business administration, American Sign Language interpreting, teacher preparation, and social work. MacMurray's deaf education and interpreter programs benefit from the college's proximity to the Illinois School for the Deaf, also located in Jacksonville.

Beginning with the fall semester of 2014, MacMurray began offering online degrees in business administration and homeland security. Business administration offered concentrations in organizational leadership, entrepreneurship, human resource management, supply chain management, marketing and management. The homeland security major offered concentrations in counterterrorism, cyber security, emergency management and intelligence.

However, later in the fall of 2014, MacMurray announced it would phase out 10 majors or minors with low enrollment and interest among prospective students, including history, English, Spanish, physical education, philosophy/religion, and a chemistry minor.

The Center for Learning Excellence provided academic support to students outside of the classroom. Center for Learning Excellence staff members are certified by the Kellogg Institute for the Training and Certification of Developmental Educators.

Jesse stated that the nursing program was "strong".

== Student body ==
Jesse stated that MacMurray students tended to be "blue collar" and studied less highly paid majors than those at Illinois College, with this contributing to the school's woes as it could not get the needed donations from alumni.

== Campus ==
The campus covered 60 acres (24 ha), and included the administration building Kathryn Hall, the McClelland Dining Hall, the Annie Merner Chapel, the Henry Pfieffer Library, the educational buildings of MacMurray Hall, Julian Chemistry, the Putnam Center for the Arts, the William H. Springer Center for Music, the Education Complex, the Gordon Facilities building, and the five residence halls of Kendall, Norris, Michalson, Rutledge and Jane. Kendall and Norris were unoccupied during the 2009–10 school year, while undergoing renovations that included sprinkler systems and aesthetic improvements. They reopened in the fall of 2010.

More than 30 student-led organizations were active on campus. The college encouraged students to be active community members with 84% involved in community work or volunteering. Career Services facilitated work and internship experience. Over 70% of students completed internships facilitated by Career Services.

On June 16–17, 2011, MacMurray College suffered damage from widespread flooding that affected the entire eastern section of the City of Jacksonville. Several dormitories and the Education Complex (EC) were flooded. The EC included the Wall Gymnasium and the MacMurray swimming pool, which had been closed for maintenance. The college estimated the losses at approximately $2 million. On July 26, President Colleen Hester made a plea to all members of the Illinois Great Rivers Conference of the Methodist Church. This plea asked for funds to help cover the uninsured repair work necessary after the flooding. This included a new gym floor in the Education Complex.

The fitness center was in the former Franklin Elementary School (of the Jacksonville School District 117), purchased by MacMurray in 2017.

== Athletics ==
MacMurray's athletic teams were known as the Highlanders. Teams competed in the NCAA's Division III. The football team was part of the Upper Midwest Athletic Conference (UMAC). The college's other teams competed in the St. Louis Intercollegiate Athletic Conference (SLIAC).

Athletic teams included baseball, men's and women's basketball, men's and women's cross country, football, men's and women's golf, men's and women's soccer, softball and women's volleyball, and men's and women's wrestling.

Thirty-five percent of MacMurray students were athletes. 45 MacMurray players were named to the Academic All-Conference Team, and 36 student-athletes were named to their respective All-Conference teams.

In 2012, the Highlanders men's basketball team narrowly missed winning the SLIAC conference tournament and an automatic berth in the NCAA Division III tournament. MacMurray lost 58–56 to Westminster College on a three-point shot with 1.7 seconds remaining in the championship game.

MacMurray College was one of the few institutions to have received the NCAA "death penalty". In 2005 the men's tennis team was sanctioned and prohibited from play for two years, with post-season play prohibited for a further two seasons, after coach and mathematics professor Neal Hart—with the knowledge of MacMurray's athletics director, and directors of financial aid and finance—gave over $162,000 in financial assistance from a fund established by his father to 10 foreign-born players, in violation of Division III rules prohibiting athletic scholarships. MacMurray never had a men's tennis team after that time.

In 2016, the school announced the return of its wrestling team after a ten-year hiatus. The school also announced the addition of a women's program and both programs began competition in the 2016–17 season. In 2016, Evan Bolwerk scored 3 goals against Eureka College. He would lead the soccer team in goals that season.

The athletic department ended in March 2020 when the college announced closure at the conclusion of the academic year. College officials cited the on-going coronavirus pandemic and resulting economic disruption factors that hastened the decision based on MacMurray's continued financial struggles.

== Notable alumni ==
- Elaine Alquist, 1966 — California state senator
- Raymond Bonner, 1964 — investigative journalist and author
- Nina Burleigh, 1982 — writer
- E. A. Carmean, 1967 — art historian and curator
- Frank Carter, 1999 — indoor football player
- Judy Collins — four-time Grammy Award-nominated singer, songwriter, musician
- Deborah J. Curtis — president, Indiana State University
- Christine Ebersole, BA 1971, PhD hon, 2002 — two-time Tony Award-winning actress
- R. Thomas Flynn, 1964 — college administrator: dean at Rutgers University; president of Monroe Community College
- Sophie Naylor Grubb, late 1850s — activist
- Al Lewis, 1984 — columnist: Dow Jones newswires
- Olindo Mare — football kicker, Chicago Bears
- Larry J. McKinney, 1966 — federal judge, United States District Court for the Southern District of Indiana
- Patricia S. Morehead — Nebraska state legislator and educator
- Martha Capps Oliver (1845–1917) — poet, hymnwriter
- Catherine Petroski, BA 1961, DLit hon, 1984 — author, journalist
- George Whitmore, 1967 — author
- Cat Zingano — All-American wrestler; professional mixed martial arts fighter, currently competing in the UFC's bantamweight division
