= Jacksonville Downtown Historic District =

Historic district in Illinois, United States

- U.S. National Register of Historic Places
- U.S. Historic district
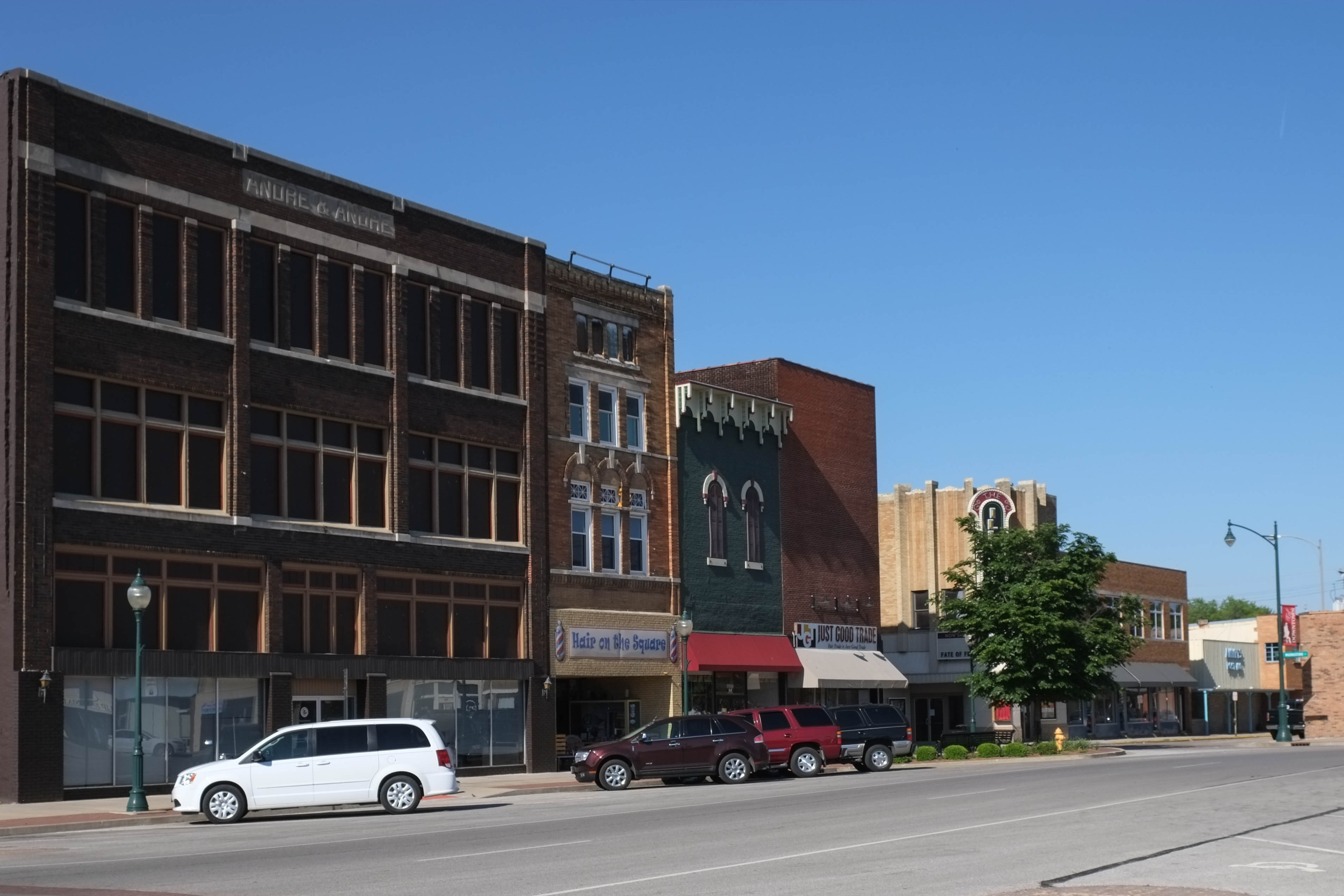

- Location within Illinois Location within the United States
- Location: Roughly bounded by Court, West, Morgan, Sandy, Main, Mauvaisterre, and State Sts., Jacksonville, Illinois
- Coordinates: 39°44′04″N 90°13′48″W
- NRHP reference No.: 100002915
- Added to NRHP: September 14, 2018

The Jacksonville Downtown Historic District is a national historic district in downtown Jacksonville, Illinois. The district encompasses a commercial area surrounding Central Park, the city's public square. Development in the district began in 1825, when Jacksonville was platted and the public square was created; the first buildings on the square were built the same year. Most of the buildings in the district were built between the 1840s and 1940s, and a large number were built during a late nineteenth-century building boom. Seven of the buildings were once cigar stores, a reflection of Jacksonville's large cigar making industry. The district includes examples of many of the popular architectural styles of the nineteenth and twentieth centuries; Italianate and Victorian buildings are especially common.

The district was added to the National Register of Historic Places on September 14, 2018.
