= WLDS =

- Jacksonville, Illinois; United States
- Broadcast area: Springfield, Illinois
- Frequency: 1180 kHz

Programming
- Format: Talk and farm information
- Affiliations: CBS News Radio; NBC News Radio; Westwood One Sports Network; Westwood One

Ownership
- Owner: Jacksonville Area Radio Broadcasters Inc
- Sister stations: WEAI

History
- First air date: December 9, 1941
- Call sign meaning: We're your Lincoln Douglas Station

Technical information
- Licensing authority: FCC
- Facility ID: 30969
- Class: D
- Power: 1,000 watts (day); 2 watts (night)
- Transmitter coordinates: 39°44′6.00″N 90°11′50.00″W

Links
- Public license information: Public file; LMS
- Webcast: Listen live
- Website: wlds.com

WLDS (1180 AM) is a radio station licensed to Jacksonville, Illinois. The station airs a Talk radio format with local news, agricultural reports and sports. It is owned by Jacksonville Area Radio Broadcasters Inc.

By day, WLDS is powered at 1,000 watts. But because 1180 AM is a clear channel frequency reserved for WHAM in Rochester, New York, WLDS must reduce power at night to 2 watts to avoid interference.

WLDS signed on the air on December 9, 1941.
