= Jacksonville Labor Temple =

- U.S. National Register of Historic Places
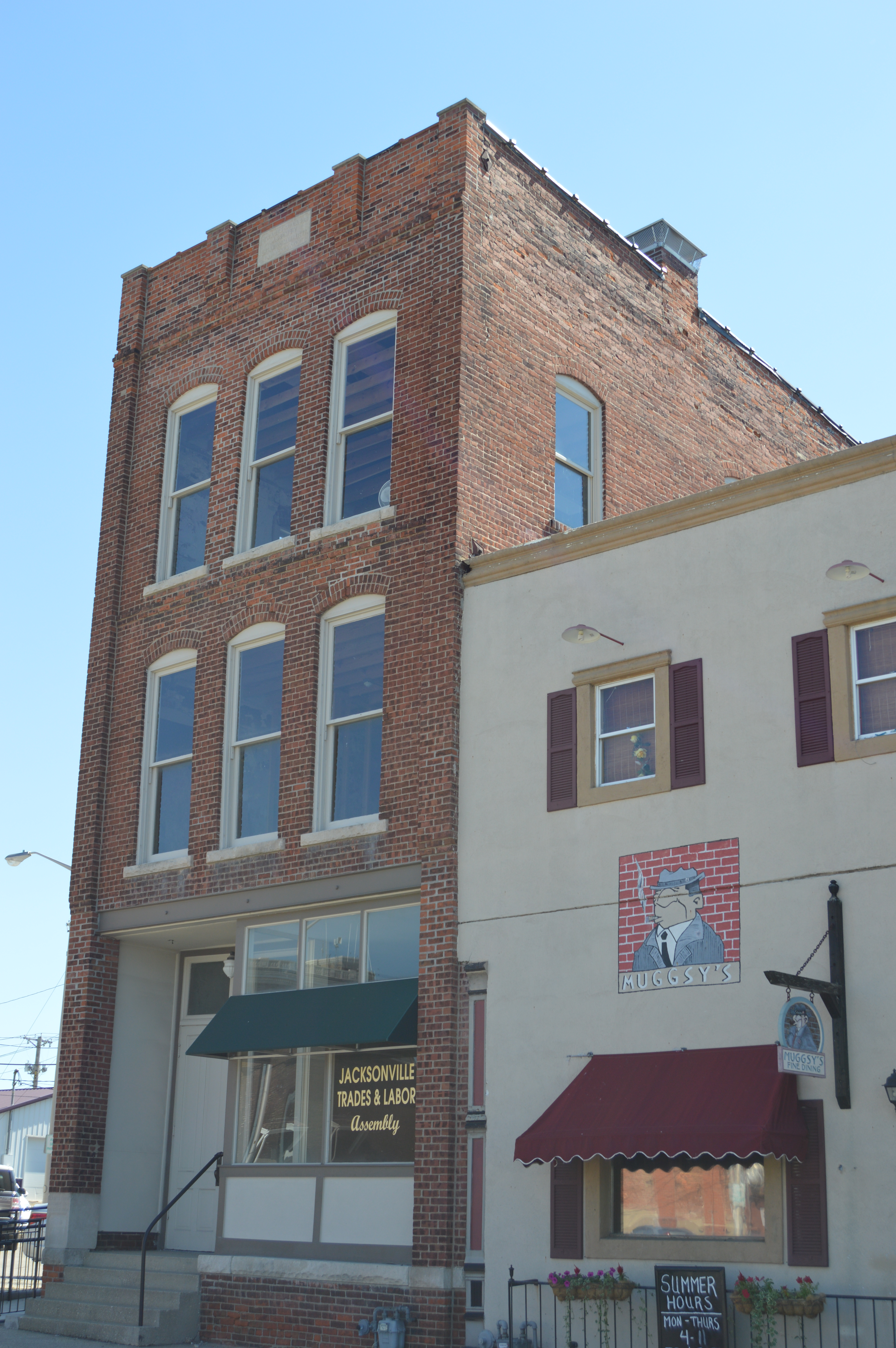

- Location within Illinois Location within the United States
- Location: 228 S. Mauvaisterre St., Jacksonville, Illinois
- Coordinates: 39°43′58″N 90°13′41″W
- Area: less than one acre
- Built: 1904
- Built by: Jacksonville Trades & Labor Assembly
- NRHP reference No.: 80004524
- Added to NRHP: November 13, 1980

The Jacksonville Labor Temple is a historic building located at 228 South Mauvaisterre Street in Jacksonville, Illinois. The Jacksonville Trades and Labor Assembly, an organization of Jacksonville labor union members formed in 1892, constructed the building in 1904 to serve as its meeting house. Union construction workers volunteered to build the building, while its remaining costs were funded by a tax on the other unions. The building was the third labor temple built in the United States, after buildings in Los Angeles and Belleville, Illinois. Jacksonville's unions have held their meetings in the building since its construction, and it is now the oldest labor temple which is still in use.

The building was added to the National Register of Historic Places on November 13, 1980.
