= Woodlawn Farm (Jacksonville, Illinois) =

- U.S. National Register of Historic Places
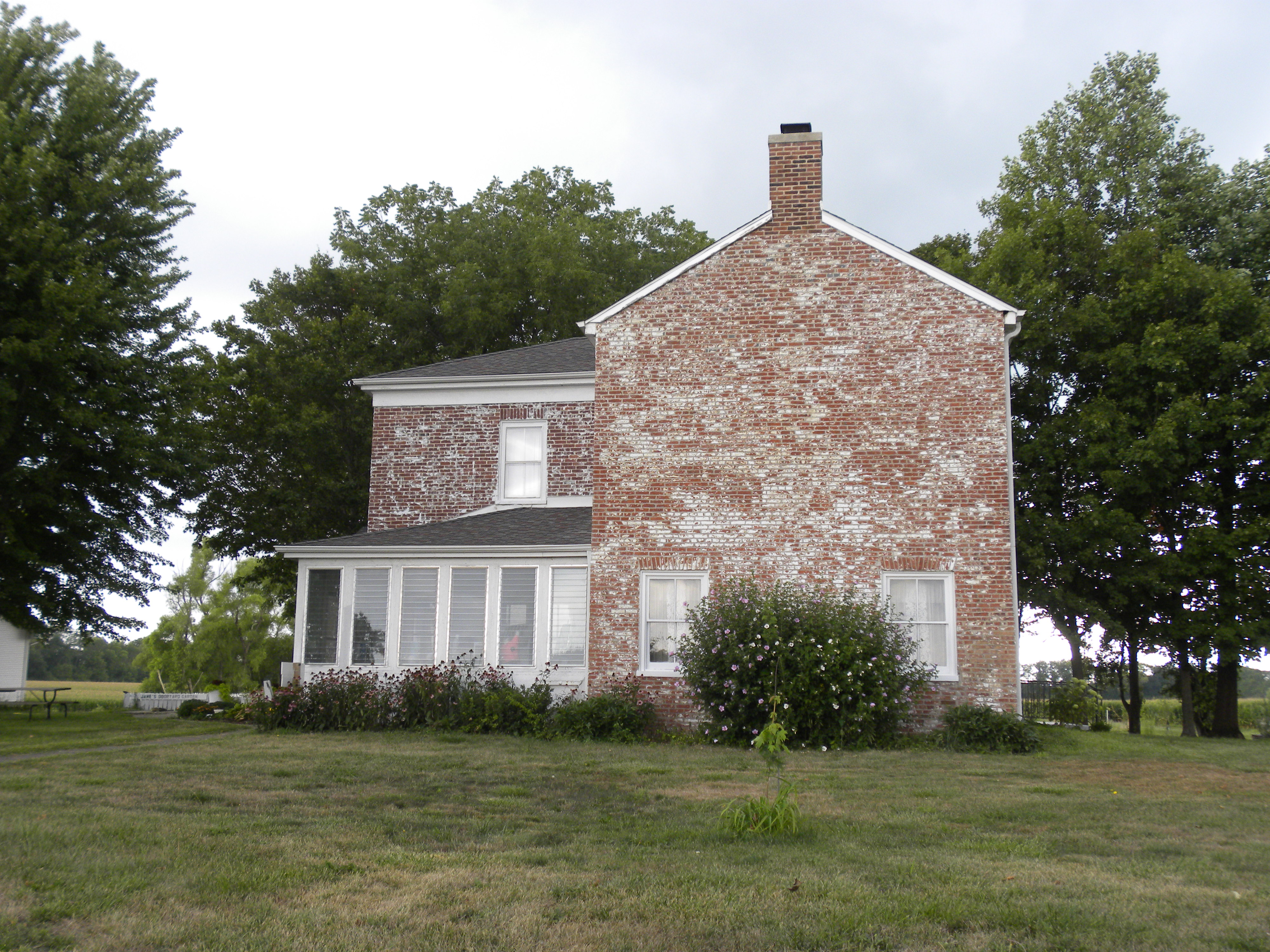

- Location within Illinois Location within the United States
- Nearest city: Jacksonville, Illinois
- Coordinates: 39°44′09″N 90°08′22″W
- Area: 6 acres (2.4 ha)
- Built: 1840
- Architectural style: Greek Revival, I-house
- NRHP reference No.: 07000146
- Added to NRHP: June 6, 2007

Woodlawn Farm is a historic farm located at 1463 Gerkie Lane east of Jacksonville, Illinois. Michael Huffaker, one of Morgan County's first settlers, established the farm in the 1824 after purchasing a 160-acre plot to the south of Jacksonville, Illinois. Due to the many agricultural innovations of the 1830s, Huffaker earned a significant amount of money from his farm and became one of the county's wealthiest residents. Huffaker mainly raised livestock, particularly cattle and pigs, on his farm; while he also grew crops, the grain mainly served as feed. In 1840, Huffaker built the farmhouse, an I-house with a Greek Revival entrance and frieze, that still stands on the property. According to local tradition, the house was a stop on the Underground Railroad; as Huffaker employed many free black farmhands, he could conceal escaped slaves among his workers.

The farm was added to the National Register of Historic Places on June 6, 2007.

Currently, Woodlawn Farm Museum is funded by a volunteer committee, the Underground Railroad (UGRR) Committee founded by Art Wilson and Abbie Templin Smith. The committee purchased Woodlawn farm with the assistance of the Morgan County Historical Society. The UGRR Committee serves as a not-for-profit agency to provide education to individuals interested in learning about the underground railroad movement in Morgan County.
