= Catherine Petroski =

American writer and photographer (born 1939)

- Born: Catherine Groom; 1939 (age 86–87); St. Louis, Missouri, U.S.
- Education: MacMurray College; University of Illinois Urbana-Champaign
- Occupations: Writer; photographer
- Spouse: Henry Petroski (died 2023)
- Children: 2

Catherine Petroski (born 1939), born Catherine Groom in St. Louis, Missouri, is an American writer and photographer.

== Life ==
She holds degrees from MacMurray College and the University of Illinois at Urbana-Champaign. She has taught writing and literature at Duke University, the University of North Carolina at Chapel Hill, and aboard ships at sea. She is a member of the National Book Critics Circle, the Authors Guild, and SABR, the Society for American Baseball Research.

William H. Gass described her writing as "quiet, lyrical, deeply meditative" prose from which a "lovely and mysterious" meaning emerges.... "It is a process that is wonderful to watch." Novelist Hilma Wolitzer wrote that Petroski "understands perfectly the world of childhood and makes the reader see the ways in which we become adults."

Maritime historian Joan Druett described A Bride's Passage as "a superbly written, formidably researched retelling of Susan Hathorn's honeymoon voyage through the pages of her diary." Publishers Weekly's starred review described A Bride's Passage as "a compelling contribution to maritime literature and the lives of Victorian-age women...."

She lives in Durham, North Carolina. Her husband was the engineer and author Henry Petroski; they had children Karen and Stephen.

== Awards ==
She has been awarded National Endowment for the Arts Fellowships in Creative Writing, residency fellowships at the Corporation of Yaddo, and has been a Scholar and a Fellow at the Bread Loaf Writers' Conference. She won the Texas Institute of Letters Prize in short fiction, and her biography of Susan Hathorn, A Bride's Passage: Susan Hathorn's Year Under Sail, won the John Lyman Prize for Biography and was hailed as "a valuable social history of a maritime family in mid-19th-century New England."

== Writings ==
- "History Through Paper Windows", Duke Magazine, 1997

=== Books ===
- Gravity and Other Stories. Fiction International. 1981. ISBN 978-0-931362-05-7.
- Beautiful My Mane in the Wind. Houghton Mifflin. 1983. ISBN 978-0-395-33074-6.
- The Summer that Lasted Forever. Houghton Mifflin. 1984. ISBN 978-0-395-35388-2.
- A Bride's Passage: Susan Hathorn's Year Under Sail. UPNE. 1997. ISBN 978-1-55553-297-0.

=== Photography ===
- The House with Sixteen Handmade Doors: A Tale of Architectural Choice and Craftsmanship, by Henry Petroski. W. W. Norton, 2014. ISBN 978-0393242041

=== Anthology appearances ===
- The Faber Book of Contemporary Stories about Childhood, Lorrie Moore (ed) Faber and Faber (May 5, 1997) ISBN 978-0-571-17083-8
- I Know Some Things: Stories About Childhood by Contemporary Writers, Lorrie Moore (ed) Faber & Faber (June 1993) ISBN 978-0-571-19802-3
- Jo's Girls Christian McEwen (ed) Beacon Press (June 30, 1997) ISBN 978-0-8070-6211-1
- The PEN Short Story Collection Alice Adams (ed) Ballantine Books (October 12, 1985) ISBN 978-0-345-32126-8
- Stories for Free Children Letty Cottin Pogrebin (ed) Mcgraw-Hill (September 1983) ISBN 978-0-07-050398-4
- Prize Stories: Texas Institute of Letters Marshall Terry (ed) Still Point Press (March 1986) ISBN 978-0-933841-04-8
- William Abrahams, ed. (1989). Prize Stories 1989: The O. Henry Awards. Doubleday. ISBN 978-0-385-24633-0.
