= Jan Czekajewski =

Polish-American engineer

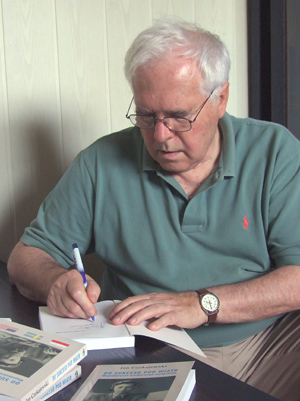
- Czekajewski at a book signing event
- Born: 1934 (age 91–92); Poland
- Citizenship: United States
- Education: Uppsala University (Ph.D.)
- Occupation: Medical equipment designer
- Known for: Columbus Instruments

Jan Czekajewski (born 1934) is a Polish-American engineer and owner/president of Columbus Instruments.

== Biography ==
Jan Czekajewski was born in 1934 in Częstochowa, Poland. He obtained his master's degree in Electronic Instrumentation from Wroclaw Technical University, Poland. During 1960–1968, he worked at the Institute of Physics Uppsala University, Sweden, where he got his Ph.D. On March 3, 1968 he emigrated to the United States where he started his own company, Columbus Instruments, producing bio-medical and ecological equipment based on his own inventions. Columbus Instruments sells research equipment to 50 countries, including Poland.

He published an autobiography.

== Awards and recognition ==
In 2011, the association Polonia Technica attributed him honorary member title.

== Patents ==
- U.S. Patent 4,337,726. Animal Activity Monitor and Behavioral Processor - Inventors: Czekajewski; Jan A., Hill; Harold L., Kober; Kenneth J. - Issued July 6, 1982
- U.S. Patent 4,947,339 Method and Apparatus for Measuring Respiration, Oxidation and Similar Interacting Between a Sample and a Selected Component of a Fluid Medium - Inventors: Inventors: Czekajewski Jan A. and Nennerfelt B. - Issued: August 7, 1990
- U.S. Patent 3,602,806 Selective Activity Meter for Laboratory Animals - Inventors: Czekajewski Jan A. - Issued: August 31, 1971
- U.S. Patent 3,65,1318 Cardiac Output Computer - Inventors: Czekajewski; Jan A. - Issued: March 21, 1972

== Publications ==
- Book: "Musing of an rebellious emigrant" by Jan Czekajewski, ISBN 978-0615715520
- Export-Control Paranoia - Controlling personal-computer exports may be an impossible dream at great national expense
- Memoir of Jan Czekajewski's father, Franciszek, from Hitler's 1939-1945 era
- Wizyta w Pałacu Villersexel - czyli Upojny Czar Arystokracji francuskiej (A Visit in Villersexel Place - Charm of French Aristocracy)
- Remediation Weekly – Science & News Journal, Volume 1, Number 23, November 15, 2004, Respirometry: A Breath of Fresh Air, By Chris Adams and Dr. Jan Czekajewski
- Pradip K. Ghosh and Jan Czekajewski, "Cardiac Output Measurement in Mice by Thermodilution", Lab Animal, October 2000, Vol 29, No.9
- P.A. Tove, B. Norman, Isaksson and Jan Czekajewski, "Direct- Recording Frequency and Amplitude Meter for Analysis of Musical and Other Sonic Waveforms", Electronic Department, Institute of Physics, Uppsala University, Uppsala, Sweden. The Journal of Acoustical Society of America, Vol39, No2, 362–371, February 1966
- P.A. Tove (University of Uppsala, Sweden) and J. Czekajewski (Marie-Curie Skladowska University, Lublin, Poland), "Pulse Period Meter with Short Response Time, Applied to Cardiotachometry", Electronic Engineering, May 1964
- Jan Czekajewski (Uppsala Instruments, Uppsala, Sweden), "An Activity Meter for Small Laboratory Animals Maintained Singly or in the Groups", Laboratory Animals (1968),2,49-50
- J. Czekajewski, J. Eksted and E. Stalberg, Uppsala University, Wallenberg Laboratory, "Oscilloscopic recording of muscle fiber potential. The window trigger and the delay unit", Electroencephalography and Clinical Neurophysiology. 27(5):536-9 (1969)
- M.W. Torello, J. Czekajewski, E.A. Potter, K.J. Kober, Y.K. Fung, "An automated method for measurement of circling behavior in the mouse", Pharmacology Biochemistry Behavior. 19 (1):13-7 (1983)
- Richard F. Leighton (Ohio State University) and Jan Czekajewski (Columbus Instruments), "Use of a new cardiac output computer for human hemodynamic studies", Journal of Applied Physiology. June 1, 1971 vol.30 no. 6914–916
- Chris Adams and Dr. Jan Czekajewski, "Respirometry: A Breath of Fresh Air", Remediation Weekly-Science and News Journal. Vol 1, Number 23, November 15, 2004
- J. Czekajewski, L. Nennerfelt, J.F. Rabek (Stockholm Technical University, Stockholm, Sweden), "Application of a new generation of computerized apparatus for the study of oxygen uptake and production of CO2 during photo (thermal) oxidation of Polymers", Acta Polymer,45, 369–374, 175 (1994)
- Ghosh P.K., Jiang D., Lin Y., Czekajewski. J., "Use of Computerized O2/CO2 Respirometer in Measuring Respiration of Prostate Cancer Tissue", Abstract, Society for the Study of Reproduction Meeting, 1998
- Jiahua Jiang, Pradip Ghosh, Samuel K. Kulp, Yasuro Sugimoto, Suling Liu, Jan Czekajewski, Hsiang-Lin Chang and Young C. Lin, "Effects of Gossypol on Consumption and CO2 Production in Human Prostate Cells", Anticancer Research 22:1491-1496 (2002)
- Czekajewski J., Tove P.A., "A cardiotachometer with fast response", Medical Electronics and Biological Engineering (1965) 3:57-63, January 1.1965
- Czekajewski, J.; Tove, (Uppsala University, Institute of Physics) P.A.; Grabowski, Z (Kiruna Geophysical Observatory, Sweden), "A Solid State Spectrometer for Measuring the Distribution of Charged Particles in Aurorae", Nuclear Instruments and Methods; Vol:26 Febr.1, 1964, pages:66-70
- P. A. Tove and J. Czekajewski, Uppsala University, Institute of Physics, "Infrared Curtain System Detects and Counts Moving Objects", published 1961, Electronics, 34:31, p 40–43.
