= Jacksonville Historic District (Jacksonville, Illinois) =

Historic district in Illinois, United States

- U.S. National Register of Historic Places
- U.S. Historic district
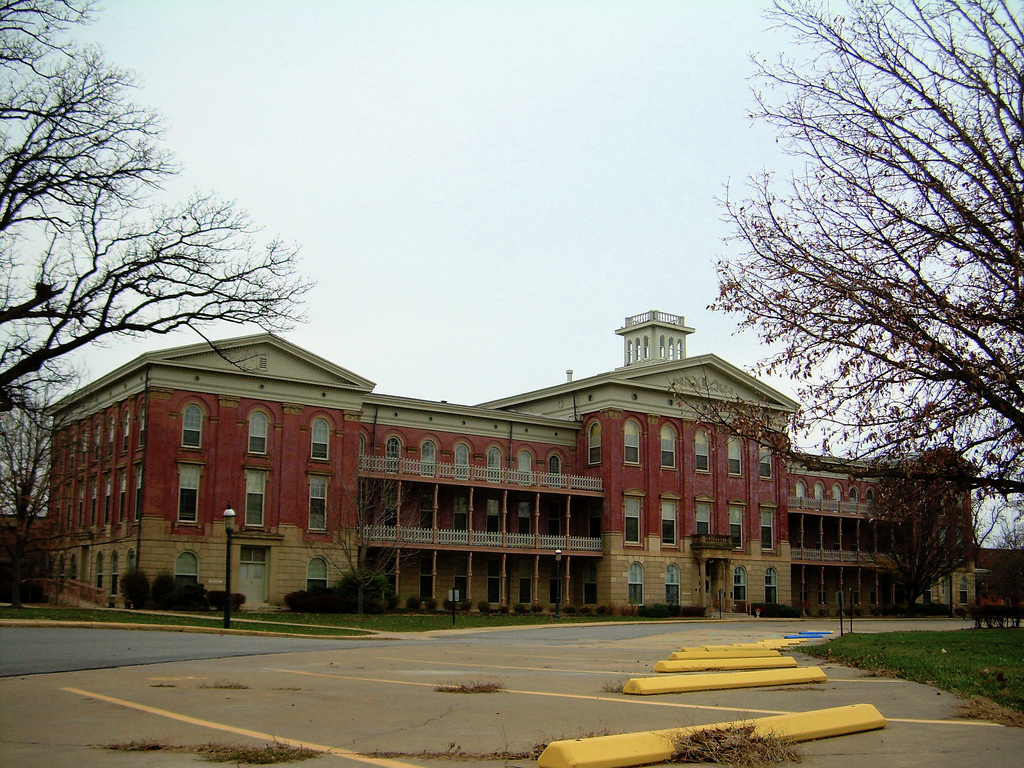
- The Illinois School for the Deaf

- Location within Illinois Location within the United States
- Location: Roughly bounded by Anna, Mound, Finley, Dayton, Lafayette and Church Sts., Jacksonville, Illinois
- Coordinates: 39°44′15″N 90°14′25″W
- Area: 284 acres (115 ha)
- Architectural style: Greek Revival, Italianate, Queen Anne
- NRHP reference No.: 78001178
- Added to NRHP: June 9, 1978

The Jacksonville Historic District is a historic district encompassing 696 buildings in Jacksonville, Illinois. The buildings in the district were mainly constructed from 1829 to the 1930s and represent nearly every popular architectural style from the period. The Greek Revival, Italianate, and Queen Anne styles are especially prevalent in the district. The district includes the campuses of two prominent Jacksonville educational institutions: Illinois College and the Illinois School for the Deaf. Illinois College, the first college in Illinois to grant a degree, was founded in 1829; its first building, Beecher Hall, is the oldest building in the district. The Illinois School for the Deaf was established in 1839 by the Illinois Legislature for the education of hearing-impaired students. Aside from these two institutions, the majority of the district is residential and includes many of Jacksonville's most historically and architecturally significant homes. The district is considered to have retained its historic character well, as 650 of its buildings are considered contributing buildings and the number of recent buildings in the district has been called "remarkably low".

The district was added to the National Register of Historic Places on June 9, 1978.
