= When Engineering Fails =

1998 film

When Engineering Fails is a 1998 film written and presented by Henry Petroski. It examines the causes of major disasters, including the explosion of the Space Shuttle Challenger, and compares the risks of computer-assisted design with those of traditional engineering methods. The original title of the film was To Engineer Is Human, the title of Petroski's non-fiction book about design failures.
