= Benjamin Henry Grierson House =

Historic house in Illinois, United States

- Gen. Benjamin Henry Grierson House
- U.S. National Register of Historic Places
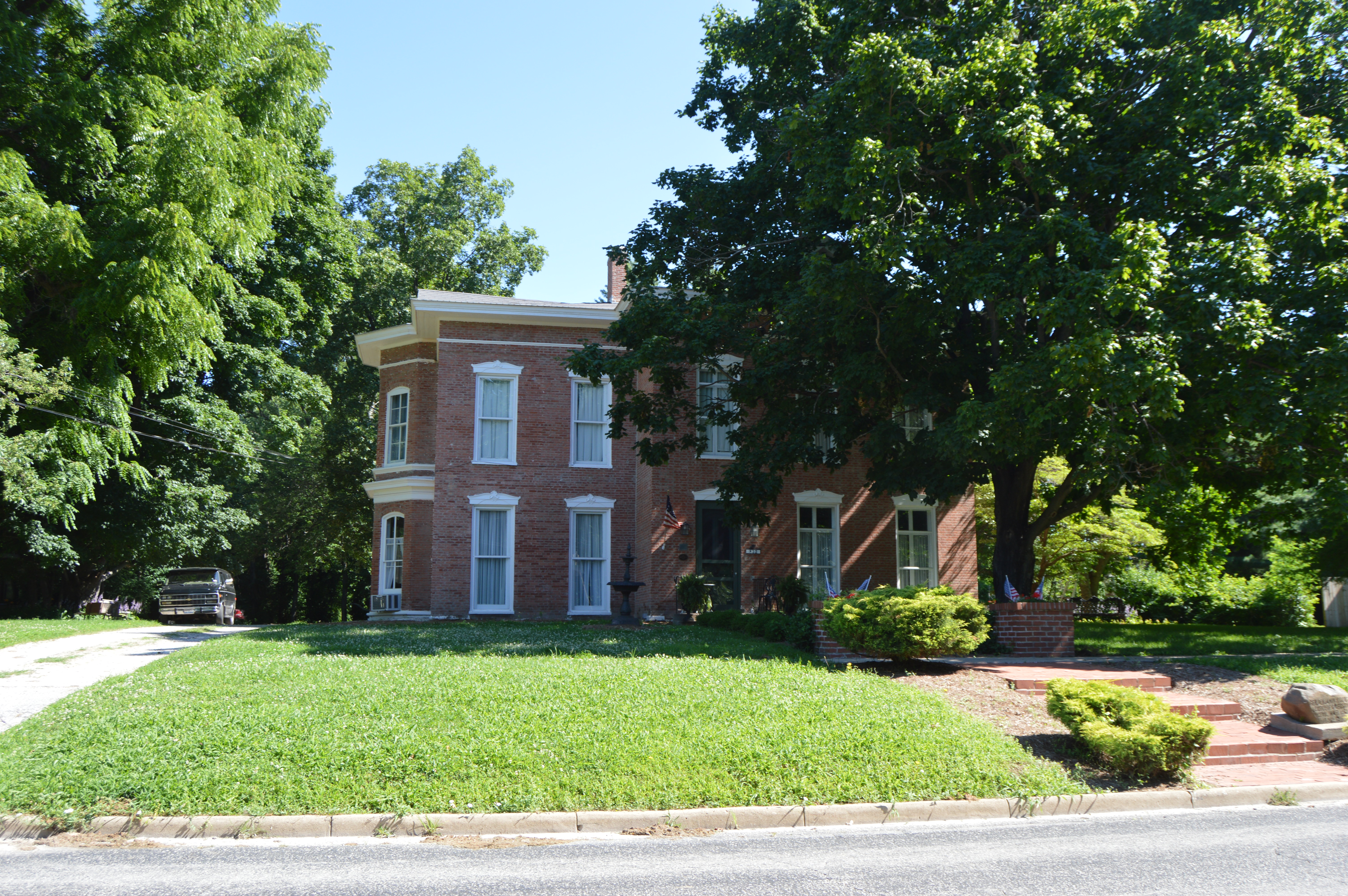

- Location within Illinois Location within the United States
- Location: 852 E. State St., Jacksonville, Illinois
- Coordinates: 39°44′04″N 90°12′45″W
- Area: less than one acre
- Built: c. 1850
- Architectural style: Italianate
- NRHP reference No.: 80001400
- Added to NRHP: November 20, 1980

The Benjamin Henry Grierson House is a historic house located at 852 East State Street in Jacksonville, Illinois. Built circa 1850, the house was the home of U.S. Army general Benjamin Grierson from 1850 until his death. Grierson was a music teacher, band leader, and mercantile businessman in Jacksonville, Illinois, from 1850 until 1861, when he joined the Union Army after the outbreak of the Civil War. During the war, Grierson led the eponymous Grierson's Raid, a mission which cut Confederate supply lines and diverted Confederate forces during the Vicksburg Campaign. After the war, Grierson served as colonel of the 10th Cavalry Regiment, one of the original Buffalo Soldier regiments of African-American cavalry. Grierson was appointed brigadier general in 1890 and retired from the Army in the same year; his house in Jacksonville served as his permanent address for his entire time in the Army.

The house was added to the National Register of Historic Places on November 20, 1980.
