= Meredosia, Illinois =

- Village
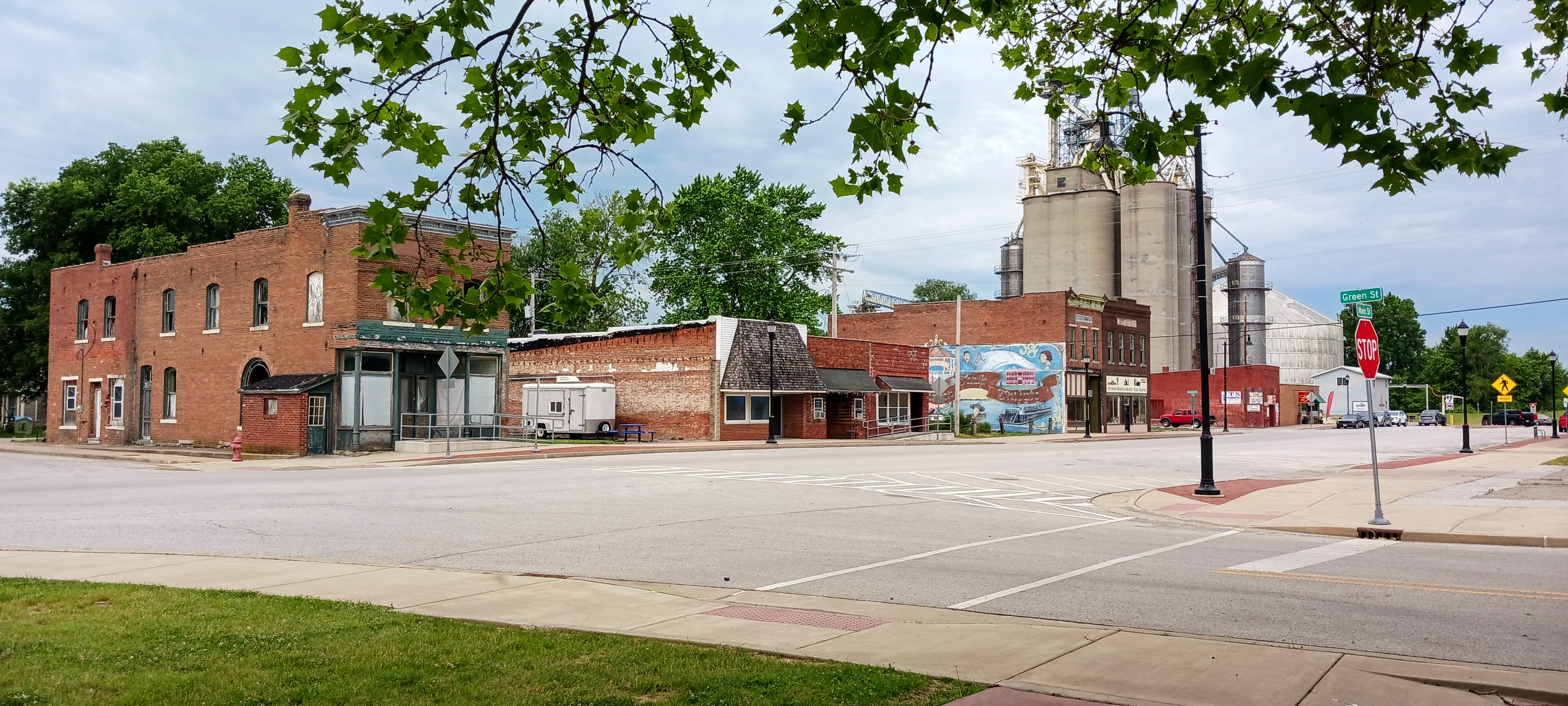
- Main Street, Meredosia

- Location in Morgan County, Illinois
- Coordinates: 39°49′51″N 90°33′25″W
- Country: United States
- State: Illinois
- County: Morgan

Area
  - Total: 0.90 sq mi (2.33 km^{2})
  - Land: 0.86 sq mi (2.24 km^{2})
  - Water: 0.039 sq mi (0.10 km^{2})
- Elevation: 443 ft (135 m)

Population (2020)
  - Total: 826
  - Density: 955.9/sq mi (369.08/km^{2})
- Time zone: UTC-6 (CST)
  - Summer (DST): UTC-5 (CDT)
- ZIP code: 62665
- Area code: 217
- FIPS code: 17-48424
- GNIS feature ID: 2399316
- Website: www.villageofmeredosia.com

Meredosia is a village in Morgan County, Illinois, United States. The population was 826 at the 2020 census, down from 1,044 in 2010. It is part of the Jacksonville Micropolitan Statistical Area.

== History ==
=== Closing of Ameren power station ===
In 2011, Ameren Energy Resources Company announced the closure of its power station in Meredosia. The closure resulted in a loss of over 50 jobs, a major economic hit for the small community. The plant closure was related to the cost of meeting environmental regulations. The plant may reopen at some point as a facility to test clean coal technology, according to Ameren.

=== New bridge ===
In June 2018 the community celebrated the opening of a new bridge over the Illinois River. The former bridge, constructed in 1936, had become too narrow for modern traffic, and was dismantled during the summer of 2018. The bridge not only links Meredosia to Quincy, Illinois, but serves as an important transportation link between western Illinois and the center of the state.

== Geography ==
Meredosia is in far northwestern Morgan County, on the east bank of the Illinois River, the border with Pike County. Illinois Route 104 passes through the village as its Main Street, leading east and then southeast 21 miles (34 km) to Jacksonville, the county seat, and west across the river and 50 miles (80 km) to Quincy.

According to the U.S. Census Bureau, Meredosia has a total area of 0.90 square miles (2.33 km^{2}), of which 0.04 square miles (0.10 km^{2}), or 4.11%, are water.

The Meredosia National Wildlife Refuge is directly north of the village, within the Illinois River floodplain.

Marais d'Osier, meaning willow swamp, was the original French name given to the area in the early 1800s.

== Demographics ==
Historical population
Census	Pop.	Note	%±
1880	750		—
1890	621		−17.2%
1900	700		12.7%
1910	951		35.9%
1920	810		−14.8%
1930	820		1.2%
1940	998		21.7%
1950	940		−5.8%
1960	1,034		10.0%
1970	1,178		13.9%
1980	1,272		8.0%
1990	1,134		−10.8%
2000	1,041		−8.2%
2010	1,044		0.3%
2020	826		−20.9%
U.S. Decennial Census

As of the census of 2000, there were 1,041 people, 450 households, and 301 families residing in the village. The population density was 1,130.3 inhabitants per square mile (436.4/km^{2}). There were 486 housing units at an average density of 527.7 per square mile (203.7/km^{2}). The racial makeup of the village was 99.90% White, and 0.10% from two or more races. Hispanic or Latino of any race were 0.10% of the population.

There were 450 households, out of which 28.2% had children under the age of 18 living with them, 55.1% were married couples living together, 8.7% had a female householder with no husband present, and 33.1% were non-families. 30.2% of all households were made up of individuals, and 16.7% had someone living alone who was 65 years of age or older. The average household size was 2.31 and the average family size was 2.85.

In the village, the population was spread out, with 24.0% under the age of 18, 6.4% from 18 to 24, 25.2% from 25 to 44, 25.2% from 45 to 64, and 19.2% who were 65 years of age or older. The median age was 41 years. For every 100 females, there were 97.5 males. For every 100 females age 18 and over, there were 95.3 males.

The median income for a household in the village was $32,961, and the median income for a family was $40,917. Males had a median income of $31,979 versus $16,842 for females. The per capita income for the village was $19,391. About 5.8% of families and 9.2% of the population were below the poverty line, including 11.6% of those under age 18 and 4.4% of those age 65 or over.
