= Meredosia National Wildlife Refuge =

National wildlife refuge in Illinois

- IUCN category IV (habitat/species management area)
- Location within Illinois
- Location: Cass County, Morgan County, Illinois, United States
- Nearest city: Meredosia, Illinois
- Coordinates: 39°51′45″N 90°33′45″W
- Area: 5,255 acres (21.27 km^{2})
- Established: 1973
- Governing body: U.S. Fish and Wildlife Service
- Website: Meredosia National Wildlife Refuge

The Meredosia National Wildlife Refuge is a 5,255-acre (21.27 km^{2}) national wildlife refuge located along the Illinois River in Cass County and Morgan County in the U.S. state of Illinois. The refuge is adjacent to Meredosia, Illinois, but is managed by the U.S. Fish and Wildlife Service from a headquarters located in Havana, Illinois.

== Ecology and history ==
The Meredosia National Wildlife Refuge is located on a riverine zone, historically wetland, that borders the Illinois River and its flyway for waterfowl. Much of the Refuge is located on a patch of wetland that is still called Meredosia Island although it is now permanently connected to the mainland by drained parcels of former riverbed. To the east of the Refuge is a large shallow lake, Meredosia Lake.

While attempts were made in the early 1900s to drain and reclaim much of the Illinois Riverbed for farming, this was not done with Meredosia Island. The sodden land, which resisted reclamation, was acquired in the early 1920s by the Chicago Meredosia Gun Club, a group of men of means who appreciated the opportunity to shoot ducks and geese.

The gun club's caretakers began the active management of ponds on Meredosia Island for waterfowl. After the federal Fish and Wildlife Service took over much of the Island in 1973 to form the current Refuge, these efforts continued.

Fish and Wildlife Service land acquisition efforts continue. As of 2009, the USFWS had acquired a 3,582-acre (14.50 km^{2}) parcel, slightly less than 70 percent of the total authorized "footprint" that the Refuge will cover when the acquisition process is complete. The lands currently under active federal ownership or management are now managed not only for waterfowl, but also for shorebirds, wading birds and other wildlife that are native to the Illinois River valley.

The Fish and Wildlife Service's long-range plans for the Refuge call for it to contain a mixture of backwater lake, bottomland forest, upland forest, prairie, seasonal wetland, and permanent marsh habitats.
