= Markham, Morgan County, Illinois =

Markham, Illinois
- Unincorporated community
- Location within Illinois Location within the United States
- Coordinates: 39°44′45″N 90°19′40″W
- Country: United States
- State: Illinois
- County: Morgan
- Elevation: 594 ft (181 m)
- Time zone: UTC-6 (Central (CST))
  - Summer (DST): UTC-5 (CDT)
- Area code: 217
- GNIS feature ID: 422941

Markham (also Markham Station) is an unincorporated community in Morgan County, Illinois, United States.
