= WEAI (FM) =

- Lynnville, Illinois; United States
- Broadcast area: Jacksonville, Illinois
- Frequency: 107.1 MHz
- Branding: The Eagle

Programming
- Format: Hot AC

Ownership
- Owner: Jacksonville Area Radio Broadcasters Inc
- Sister stations: WLDS

Technical information
- Licensing authority: FCC
- Facility ID: 30970
- Class: A
- ERP: 6,000 watts
- HAAT: 100 meters (330 ft)

Links
- Public license information: Public file; LMS

WEAI (107.1 FM) is a radio station licensed to Lynnville, Illinois, United States, serving the Jacksonville, Illinois area. The station airs a hot adult contemporary format, and is currently owned by Jacksonville Area Radio Broadcasters Inc.
