= Illinois School for the Visually Impaired =

Location
- 658 East State Street; Jacksonville, Illinois; United States; 39.7351°N 90.2199°W

Information
- Type: Public
- Established: 1849; 177 years ago
- Head teacher: Serena Preston (Superintendent)
- Grades: PreK–12
- Enrollment: 40 (9–12 only)
- Colors: maroon gold
- Mascot: Warrior
- Accreditation: Illinois State Board of Education; North Central Association
- Website: www.dhs.state.il.us

The Illinois School for the Visually Impaired (ISVI), located in Jacksonville, Illinois, is a state-operated pre-kindergarten, elementary and high school for the blind and visually impaired. The school provides educational instruction and other resources for not only its school-aged students but also for persons up to age 21.

Founded in 1849 as the Illinois Institution for the Education of the Blind, the school was known as the Illinois School for the Blind from 1905 to 1954 and the Illinois Braille and Sight Saving School from then until the 1976/77 school year, when it gained its current name.

== Campus ==
The school has a dormitory.

== Athletics ==
ISVI is an active member of the Illinois High School Association and fields teams (known as the Warriors) in sports such as swimming as well as Track and field for both male and female competitors. The school also offers wrestling for males and competitive cheerleading for females.

== Notable alumni ==
- Lennie Tristano, jazz musician
