= Polonia Technica =

Polonia Technica, Inc.
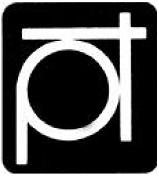
- Founded: January 1, 1941
- Type: Professional Organization
- Purpose: Networking, promotion and achievements of Polish engineers spread all over the globe
- Location: New York, NY
- Origins: Collaboration of engineers and technical professionals, originally from Poland
- Region served: Worldwide
- Method: Conferences, Publications
- Key people: Victor Kiszkiel, Janusz Romański, Ryszard Bąk, Janusz Zastocki
- Website: www.poloniatechnica.org

Polonia Technica, Inc., also known as Association of Polish-American Engineers, is a non-profit organization, established in 1941 in New York City, by a group of Polish engineers, who, after the outbreak of the World War II, found themselves in the United States of America. The organization serves as a professional and social link for Polish engineers and technicians living in the United States.

Referenced by Consulate General of the Republic of Poland in New York, it is also related to Polish Assistance Inc. in New York.

== History ==
Founded in 1941. The organization contributed to initiation of Studia 4U program coordinated by PSO (Polish Student Organization).

== Publications ==
Polish American Engineers Association, 2006 Recognition Award Banquet

== Events ==
2011-09-19: Studia 4U 2011 wspolorganizowane przez Polonia Technica oraz Polish Student Organization z Nowego Jorku

2011-05-13: 70-years of Polonia Technica celebrated on May 13 through 15th, 2011

2011-01-09: Walne Zebranie Sprawozdawczo-Wyborcze

2010-12-17: Inter-organizational holiday party 2010 in Polish Consulate, NYC

2010-12-12: 65-lecie Naczelnej Organizacji Technicznej NOT w Warszawie

2010-10-03: Pulaski Parade 2010

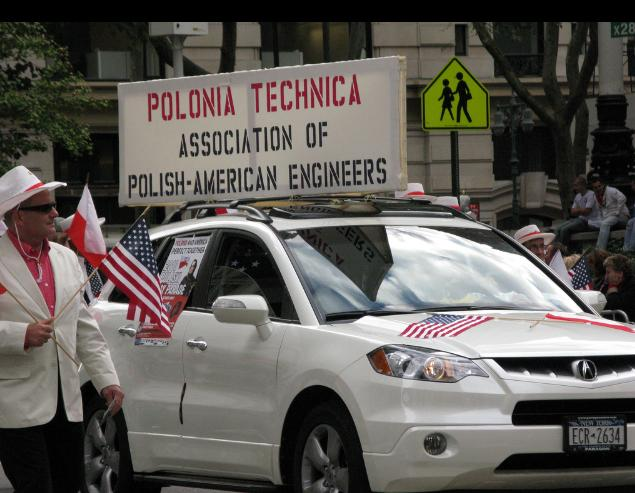

2010-09-08 through 2010-09-10: World Convention of Polish Engineers in Warsaw, Poland

2009-12-03 through 2009-12-04: 10th Polish - American Conference on Science and Technology

== Latest News ==
- Polonia Technica, Inc. and other Polish-American engineers had a strong presence at the World Convention of Polish Engineers, Warsaw 8–10 September 2010. Odwiedzili Politechnikę po latach is a title of a video report by Piotr Rytel and Bartłomiej Kowalski from TVPW, which shows an overview of that successful event as well as interviews with the most prominent individuals of Polish engineering industry both in Poland and internationally.
- The Kosciuszko Foundation - Petition on German Concentration Camps: Petition on German Concentration Camps

== Sources ==
- Archives of Polonia Technica: www.polonia-technica.org

Jan Czekajewski - supporting member
