= Routt Catholic High School =

Location
- 500 East College Avenue; Jacksonville, Illinois 62650; United States; 39.7329°N 90.2223°W

Information
- Type: private
- Denomination: Roman Catholic
- Established: 1902
- Oversight: Diocese of Springfield
- Principal: Danielle Evans
- Faculty: 25 FTE
- Grades: 9–12
- Gender: coed
- Enrollment: 132 (2023)
- Average class size: 12
- Student to teacher ratio: 9:1
- Campus size: Small
- Campus type: School
- Colors: Purple, White and Vegas Gold
- Slogan: Enter to Grow, Leave to Serve
- Athletics: All
- Athletics conference: Western Illinois Valley
- Mascot: Rockets
- Team name: Rockets
- Accreditation: North Central Association of Colleges and Schools
- School fees: $250
- Tuition: $4,650
- Website: routtcatholic.com

Routt Catholic High School is a private Roman Catholic high school in Jacksonville, Illinois. It is affiliated under the Roman Catholic Diocese of Springfield, Illinois.

== Background ==
Routt High School was founded in 1902 through the inspiration of Rev. Dean John W. Crowe, the encouragement of Fr. Francis Formaz and the generosity of the Routt family. Routt continues to provide an education for students of all faiths, with more than 40 percent of its students self-identifying as non-Catholic.

== See also ==
- List of high schools in Illinois
- Jacksonville High School (Illinois)
