= Jacksonville School District 117 =

School district in Morgan County, Illinois, United States

Address
- 211 W State Street Jacksonville, Illinois, 62650; United States

District information
- Type: Public
- Grades: PreK–12
- NCES District ID: 1720280

Students and staff
- Students: 3,266

Other information
- Website: www.jsd117.org

Jacksonville School District 117 (JSD 117) is a school district headquartered in Jacksonville, Illinois.

Steve Ptacek became the superintendent in 2012.

Its current attendance boundaries were selected in 2017.

Jewell Mann and Robert Crowe wrote the book Rich History, Bright Future: Celebrating 150 Years of Jacksonville School District #117.

== Schools ==
Secondary

- Jacksonville High School
- Jacksonville Middle School

Elementary

- Lincoln Elementary School
- Murrayville-Woodson Elementary School
- North Elementary School
- South Elementary School
- Washington Elementary School

Early childhood

- Early Years Program

Alternative schools

- Crossroads Learning Center

=== Former schools ===
Closed schools include:

- Eisenhower Elementary School
- Franklin Elementary School
  - In 2017, MacMurray College bought the former school to convert into athletic facilities. MacMurray dissolved in 2020, and the Franklin Fitness Center was sold for $100,000. David Jesse of the Detroit Free Press stated that "Of greatest interest seemed to be the parking lot that came with it".
- Jonathan Turner Junior High School
