= Illinois School for the Deaf =

Public school in Jacksonville, Illinois, US

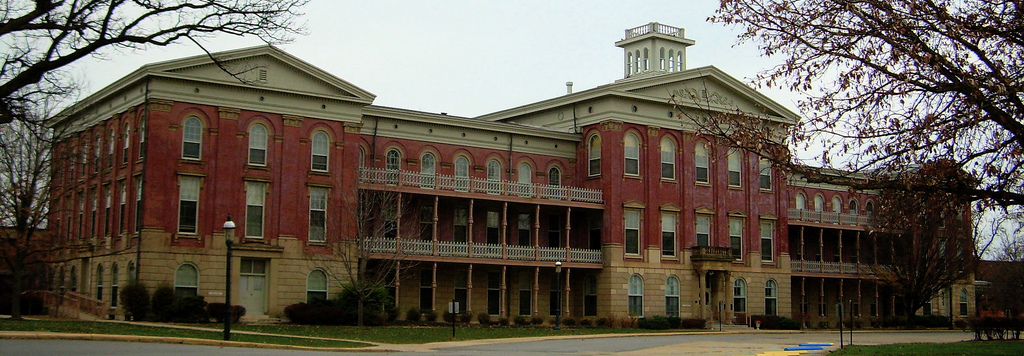

Location
- 125 South Webster Avenue; Jacksonville, Illinois 62650; United States; 39°44′01″N 90°15′07″W

Information
- Type: Public school for the deaf
- Established: 1839
- School district: Illinois Department Of Human Services
- NCES School ID: 170009805218
- Teaching staff: 45 (on an FTE basis)
- Grades: PreK–12
- Enrollment: 155 (2019)
- Student to teacher ratio: 3.44
- Colors: Orange, black and white
- Mascot: Tigers
- Accreditation: Illinois State Board of Education; North Central Association; Conference of Educational Administrators of Schools and Programs for the Deaf

The Illinois School for the Deaf (ISD), located in Jacksonville, Illinois, is a state-operated pre-kindergarten, elementary and high school for the deaf and hard-of-hearing. ISD uses both English and American Sign Language, with a policy modeled after the Wisconsin School for the Deaf.

ISD was founded in 1839 in the county seat of Morgan County.

The school includes dormitories for its students.
