= Jacksonville, Illinois =

- City
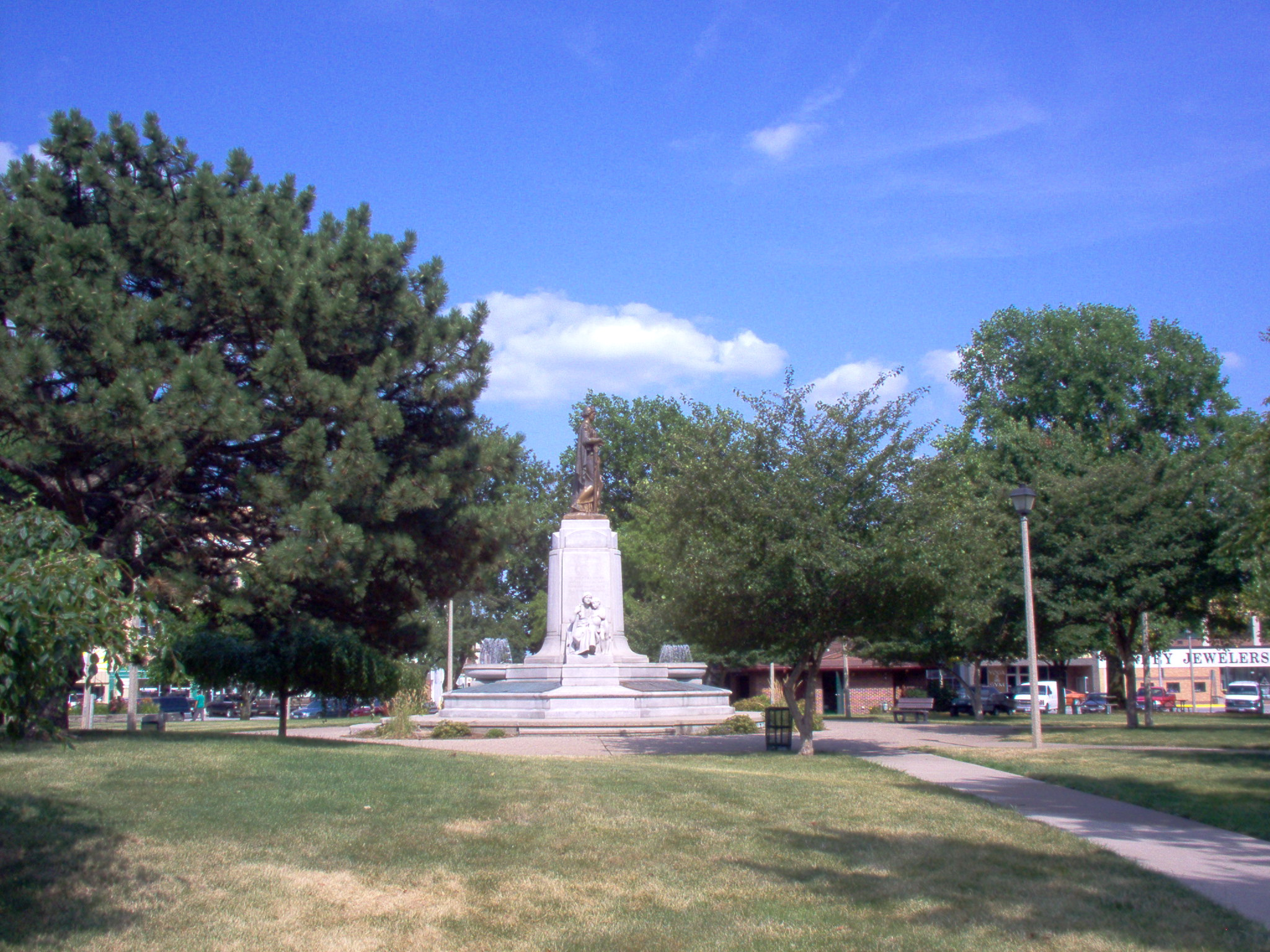
- Civil War monument in Central Park
- Nickname: "The Athens of the West"
- Motto: "Where People Make The Difference"
- Interactive map of Jacksonville, Illinois
- Location within Illinois Location within the United States
- Coordinates: 39°44′35″N 90°14′50″W
- Country: United States
- State: Illinois
- County: Morgan
- Established: 1825

Government
  - Type: Mayor-Council
  - Mayor: Andy Ezard

Area
  - Total: 10.76 sq mi (27.87 km^{2})
  - Land: 10.56 sq mi (27.36 km^{2})
  - Water: 0.20 sq mi (0.51 km^{2})
- Elevation: 584 ft (178 m)

Population (2020)
  - Total: 17,616
  - Estimate (2024): 17,801
  - Density: 1,667.8/sq mi (643.94/km^{2})
- Time zone: UTC−6 (CST)
  - Summer (DST): UTC−5 (CDT)
- ZIP Code: 62650
- Area codes: 217, 447
- FIPS code: 17-38115
- GNIS feature ID: 2395451=
- Website: www.jacksonvilleil.com

Jacksonville is a city and the county seat of Morgan County, Illinois, United States. The population was 17,616 at the 2020 census, down from 19,446 in 2010. It is home to Illinois College, Illinois School for the Deaf, and the Illinois School for the Visually Impaired, and was formerly home to MacMurray College. Jacksonville is the principal city of the Jacksonville Micropolitan Statistical Area, which includes all of Morgan and Scott counties.

== History ==
Jacksonville was established by European Americans on a 160-acre (65 ha) tract of land in the center of Morgan County in 1825, two years after the county was founded. The founders of Jacksonville were settlers from New England, descended from the English Puritans who had settled New England in the 1600s. They were part of a wave of New England farmers who headed west into what was then the wilds of the Northwest Territory, during the early 1800s. Most of them arrived as a result of the completion of the Erie Canal and the end of the Black Hawk War.

When they arrived in what is now Jacksonville, there was only dense forest and wild prairie. The "Yankee" New Englanders laid out farms, constructed roads, erected government buildings, and established post routes. They brought certain values with them, such as a passion for education and establishing many schools, as well as a staunch support for abolitionism. They were mostly members of the Congregationalist Church, though some were Episcopalian. Due to the Second Great Awakening, some of them had converted to Methodism and Presbyterianism, while some others became Baptist, before moving to what is now Jacksonville. For most of its early history, Jacksonville, like some other parts of Illinois, would be culturally very continuous with early New England culture.

The town was laid out on a treeless prairie and along a state road that ran from Springfield to the Illinois River.

The town grew at a rapid rate, and a town square was quickly developed. In 1829, the Presbyterian Reverend John M. Ellis worked to found a new "seminary of learning" in the new state of Illinois. A group of Congregational students at Yale College heard about his plans and headed westward to establish the new school. These students were a part of the famous "Yale Bands", groups of students who established several colleges in the frontier, in what is now the Midwest. Illinois College was one of the first institutions of higher learning in the Midwest.

A new courthouse was built on the square, churches were constructed, railroads were planned, and stores and taverns were built. By 1834, Jacksonville had the largest population of any city in Illinois, vastly outnumbering Chicago, which was incorporated only the year before. In the 1830s, the town was on the path of Native Americans who were being forcibly removed by the federal government to west of the Mississippi. In 1838, the Potawatomi passed through, on what was called the Trail of Death, as they were forced from their traditional homelands to the dry and barren Indian Territory to the west.

Jacksonville's education complex and standing in the state were developed by the establishment of state institutions: the Illinois School for the Deaf, and what is now called the Illinois School for the Visually Impaired. The Illinois Conference Female Academy was founded for education for women, which later developed as MacMurray College. By 1850, Illinois College had issued Illinois' first college degrees and opened the first medical school in the state. Because of this, Jacksonville earned the nickname of "Athens of the West".

In 1851, Illinois opened its first state mental hospital in Jacksonville, which became a major employer for the area.

Attorney, and future president, Abraham Lincoln occasionally had legal business in Jacksonville, frequently acting either as co-counsel or opposing counsel with David A. Smith, a Jacksonville resident. In what is now Central Park, Lincoln delivered a strong antislavery speech on September 6, 1856, in support of the presidential campaign of John C. Frémont, lasting over two hours. A mural depicting the event has been painted on the side of a building at the southwest corner of the square.

Built in 1840, the Woodlawn Farm became an important stop on the Underground Railroad for escaped slaves fleeing the terrors of slavery in the South. This historical site is open to tours in the summer.

One of Lincoln's early political rivals, Stephen A. Douglas, settled in Jacksonville in 1833, where he first got involved in local politics. He quickly rose through the ranks of Illinois politics and was elected to the House of Representatives in 1842.

=== 1900 to present ===
Between 1892 and 1910, Jacksonville was home to Minor League Baseball, as the Jacksonville Jacks and Jacksonville Lunatics played in eight different minor leagues. Jacksonville teams played at League Park on Finley Street.

In 1911, as part of the progressive movement, Jacksonville adopted the city commission form of government, the first mayor being George W. Davis.

In the summer of 1965, in order to keep up with customer demand for records by the Beatles, the popular English band, Capitol Records opened a vinyl record pressing plant on the western outskirts of Jacksonville, at 1 Capitol Way. The plant produced a number of highly collectible pressings. This plant eventually served the Capitol Records Club, producing vinyl LPs and later audiocassettes, CDs, and DVDs of a number of artists. At its peak, operating as EMI Records (owner of Capitol), the plant employed over 1,000 workers. It was a significant location in the music industry. For example, all seven albums released by country western artist Garth Brooks sold more than 50million copies. EMI held a "thank-you" luncheon for 1,000 workers at the Jacksonville plant on March 10, 1995. A decade later, in 2004, EMI ceased manufacturing operations at Jacksonville.

== Geography ==
Jacksonville is located 32 miles (51 km) west of Springfield, the state capital, and 70 miles (110 km) east of Hannibal, Missouri.

Interstate 72 passes to the south of the city, with access from Exits 64 and 68. U.S. Route 67 passes just west of the city limits, leading south 64 miles (103 km) to Alton and north 66 miles (106 km) to Macomb. Illinois Route 104 passes through Jacksonville as Morton Avenue, leading southeast 18 miles (29 km) to Waverly, while Illinois Route 267 runs south from Jacksonville, leading 27 miles (43 km) to Greenfield. Illinois Route 78 leads north from Jacksonville 16 miles (26 km) to Virginia.

According to the U.S. Census Bureau, Jacksonville has a total area of 10.76 square miles (27.87 km^{2}), of which 0.20 square miles (0.52 km^{2}), or 1.83%, are water. The city sits in the middle of mostly flat, fertile farmland. One branch of Mauvaisterre Creek empties into Lake Mauvaisterre, a small reservoir surrounded on three sides by parkland. Approximately four miles south of the city lies Lake Jacksonville, a 476-acre (193 ha) lake with 18.6 miles (29.9 km) of shoreline. Lake Jacksonville was named the "Number One Fishing Spot in Illinois" by Field & Stream magazine.

=== Climate ===
Climate data for Jacksonville 2E, Illinois (1991–2020 normals, extremes 1895–present)
Month	Jan	Feb	Mar	Apr	May	Jun	Jul	Aug	Sep	Oct	Nov	Dec	Year
Record high °F (°C)	75 (24)	81 (27)	93 (34)	94 (34)	103 (39)	107 (42)	114 (46)	112 (44)	106 (41)	98 (37)	84 (29)	74 (23)	114 (46)
Mean daily maximum °F (°C)	36.0 (2.2)	41.1 (5.1)	52.4 (11.3)	64.9 (18.3)	74.8 (23.8)	83.3 (28.5)	86.5 (30.3)	85.2 (29.6)	80.0 (26.7)	67.7 (19.8)	53.0 (11.7)	41.2 (5.1)	63.8 (17.7)
Daily mean °F (°C)	27.1 (−2.7)	31.2 (−0.4)	41.2 (5.1)	52.6 (11.4)	63.3 (17.4)	72.1 (22.3)	75.3 (24.1)	73.4 (23.0)	66.7 (19.3)	55.0 (12.8)	42.5 (5.8)	32.2 (0.1)	52.7 (11.5)
Mean daily minimum °F (°C)	18.1 (−7.7)	21.4 (−5.9)	30.1 (−1.1)	40.3 (4.6)	51.7 (10.9)	60.8 (16.0)	64.0 (17.8)	61.7 (16.5)	53.5 (11.9)	42.3 (5.7)	31.9 (−0.1)	23.3 (−4.8)	41.6 (5.3)
Record low °F (°C)	−24 (−31)	−28 (−33)	−14 (−26)	10 (−12)	26 (−3)	36 (2)	43 (6)	39 (4)	23 (−5)	9 (−13)	−5 (−21)	−21 (−29)	−28 (−33)
Average precipitation inches (mm)	1.93 (49)	1.72 (44)	2.81 (71)	4.27 (108)	4.82 (122)	4.89 (124)	3.96 (101)	3.39 (86)	3.50 (89)	2.97 (75)	3.01 (76)	1.98 (50)	39.25 (997)
Average snowfall inches (cm)	5.1 (13)	4.3 (11)	2.0 (5.1)	0.3 (0.76)	0.0 (0.0)	0.0 (0.0)	0.0 (0.0)	0.0 (0.0)	0.0 (0.0)	0.0 (0.0)	1.0 (2.5)	3.5 (8.9)	16.2 (41)
Average precipitation days (≥ 0.01 in)	7.7	7.2	10.8	12.3	13.3	10.5	8.7	8.9	8.2	9.9	9.8	8.1	115.4
Average snowy days (≥ 0.1 in)	3.9	3.2	1.4	0.2	0.0	0.0	0.0	0.0	0.0	0.0	0.6	3.1	12.4
Source: NOAA

== Demographics ==
Historical population
Census	Pop.	Note	%±
1850	2,745		—
1860	5,528		101.4%
1870	9,203		66.5%
1880	10,927		18.7%
1890	12,935		18.4%
1900	15,078		16.6%
1910	15,326		1.6%
1920	15,713		2.5%
1930	17,747		12.9%
1940	19,844		11.8%
1950	20,387		2.7%
1960	21,690		6.4%
1970	20,553		−5.2%
1980	20,284		−1.3%
1990	19,324		−4.7%
2000	18,940		−2.0%
2010	19,446		2.7%
2020	17,616		−9.4%
U.S. Decennial Census

=== 2020 census ===
As of the 2020 census, Jacksonville had a population of 17,616. The median age was 40.2 years, with 18.9% of residents under the age of 18 and 19.7% of residents being 65 years of age or older. For every 100 females there were 105.3 males, and for every 100 females age 18 and over there were 104.9 males age 18 and over.

99.3% of residents lived in urban areas, while 0.7% lived in rural areas.

There were 6,907 households in Jacksonville, of which 25.5% had children under the age of 18 living in them. Of all households, 35.6% were married–couple households, 21.7% were households with a male householder and no spouse or partner present, and 34.2% were households with a female householder and no spouse or partner present. About 37.1% of all households were made up of individuals and 16.1% had someone living alone who was 65 years of age or older.

There were 7,843 housing units, of which 11.9% were vacant. The homeowner vacancy rate was 2.5% and the rental vacancy rate was 13.8%.

Racial composition as of the 2020 census
Race	Number	Percent
White	14,372	81.6%
Black or African American	1,839	10.4%
American Indian and Alaska Native	48	0.3%
Asian	208	1.2%
Native Hawaiian and Other Pacific Islander	8	0.0%
Some other race	286	1.6%
Two or more races	855	4.9%
Hispanic or Latino (of any race)	621	3.5%

=== 2010 census ===
According to the census of 2010, there were 19,446 people, 7,357 households, and 4,174 families residing in the city. The population density was 1,905 inhabitants per square mile (736/km^{2}). There were 8,162 housing units at an average density of 805.5 per square mile (311.0/km^{2}). The racial makeup of the city was 85.3% White, 10.2% African American, 0.3% Native American, 0.7% Asian, 1.1% from other races, and 2.4% from two or more races. Hispanic or Latino inhabitants of any race made up 3% of the population.

There were 7,357 households, out of which 24.3% had children under the age of 18 living with them, 38.8% were married couples living together, 13.7% had a female householder with no husband present, and 43.3% were non-families. 36.3% of all households were made up of individuals, and 13.9% had someone living alone who was 65 years of age or older. The average household size was 2.23 and the average family size was 2.88.

In the city, the age of the population had a wide spread, with 22.0% under the age of 18, 14.2% from 18 to 24, 25.1% from 25 to 44, 21.9% from 45 to 64, and 16.9% who were 65 years of age or older. The median age was 37 years. For every 100 females, there were 91.0 males. For every 100 females age 18 and over, there were 87.4 males.

The median income for a household in the city was $40,670, and the median income for a family was $56,343. Males had a median income of $42,409 versus $30,208 for females. The per capita income for the city was $21,245. About 11.9% of families and 18% of the population were below the poverty line, including 24.9% of those under age 18 and 11.8% of those age 65 or over.

== Economy ==
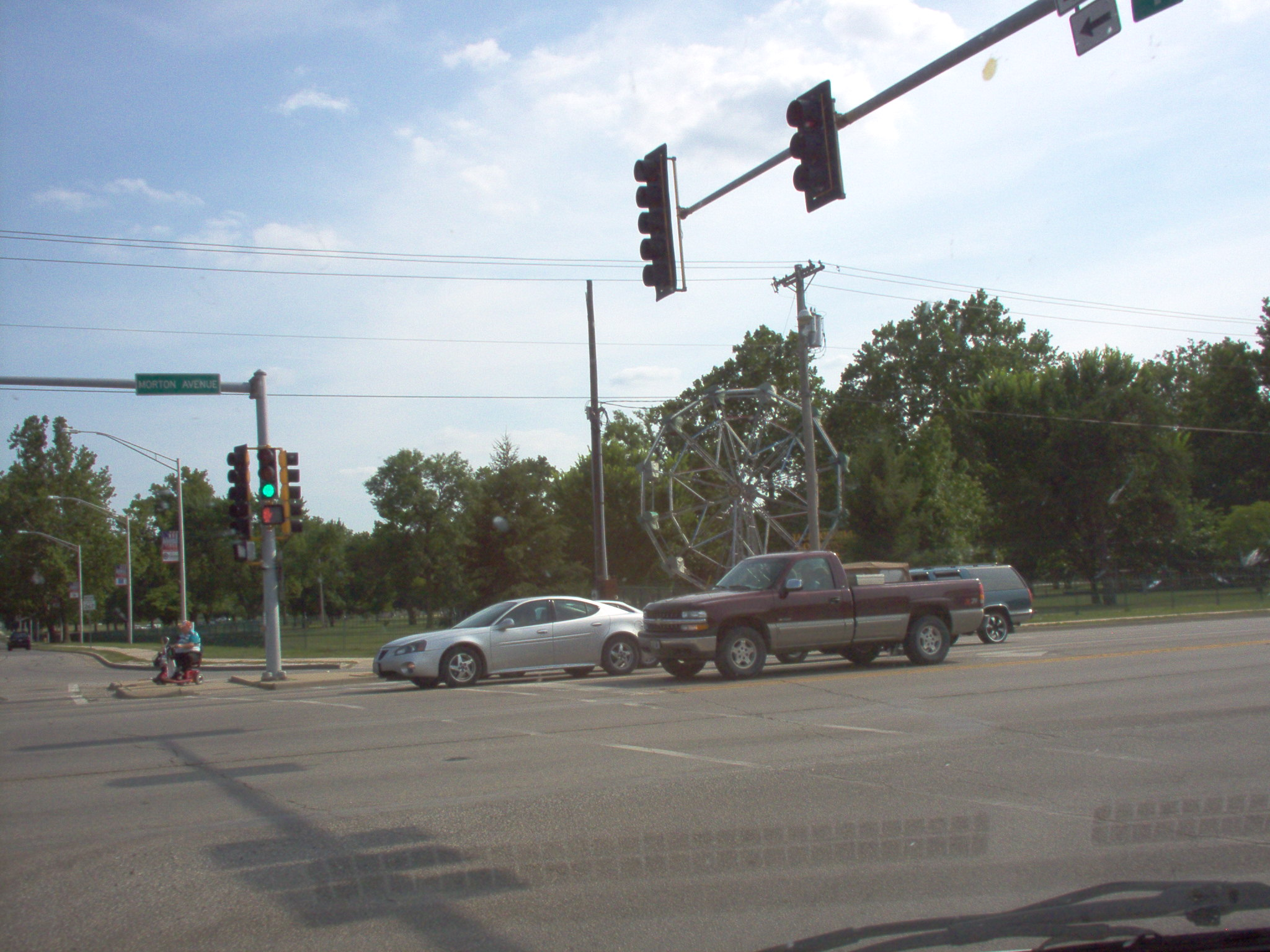
Big Eli Wheel on corner of E. Morton and S. Main

Jacksonville is the home of the Eli Bridge Company, manufacturer of Ferris wheels and other amusement rides such as the Scrambler. W. E. Sullivan founded the firm with the introduction of his first portable "Big Eli" Wheel on the Jacksonville Square on May 23, 1900. He was inspired to make this portable version of the famous amusement ride after visiting the World's Columbian Exposition and seeing the original Ferris Wheel created by George Washington Gale Ferris Jr.

Jacksonville was once home to the J. Capps & Son Company, one of the largest manufacturers of textiles and clothing in the United States, and owned by the Capps family, which was intermarried with the family of Jacob Bunn and John Whitfield Bunn of Springfield, Illinois, and Chicago.

Reynolds Group Holdings (formerly Mobil Plastics, Tenneco, Pactiv) and Nestlé Beverage Co. have facilities in Jacksonville.

Jacksonville was also home to a food processing plant for ACH Food Companies from 1952 to 2008.

== Education ==
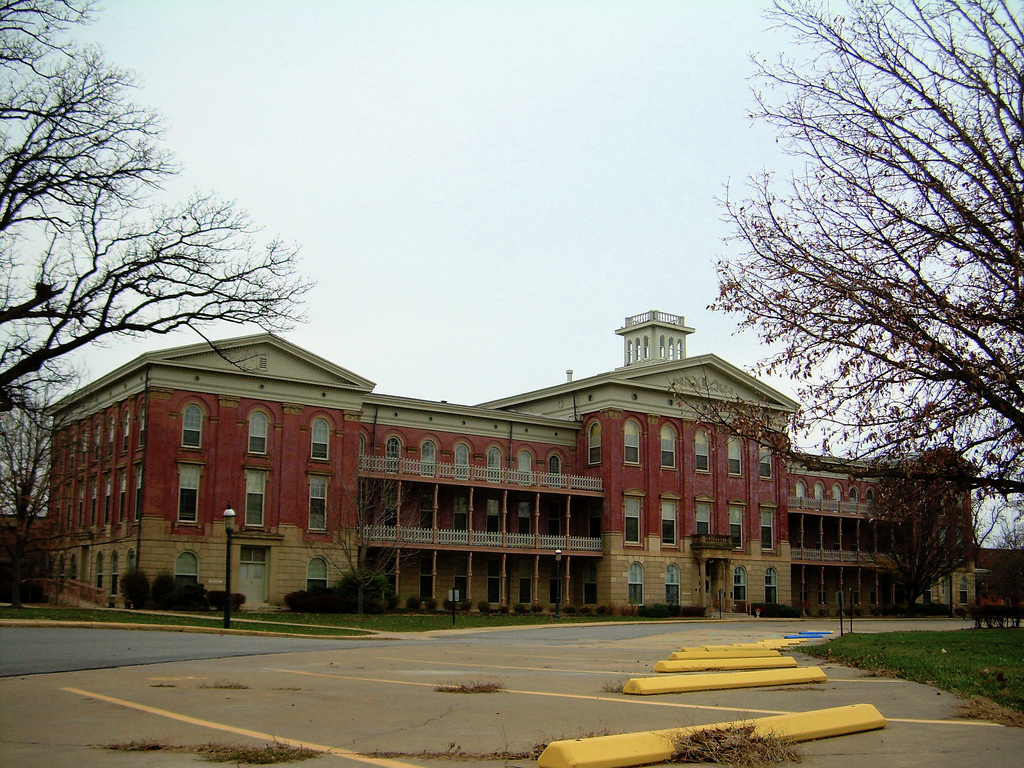
Illinois School for the Deaf

Jacksonville is home to one private four-year college, Illinois College. Illinois College is the second oldest college in Illinois, founded in 1829 (and the first to grant a degree – 1835) by one of the famous Yale Bands—students from Yale College who traveled westward to found new colleges. It briefly served as the state's first medical school from 1843 to 1848 and became co-educational in 1903. Beecher Hall, the first college building erected in Illinois, is named after its first president, Edward Beecher, brother to Henry Ward Beecher and Harriet Beecher Stowe. Jacksonville was also the home of the now-closed private four-year college, MacMurray College, from 1846 to 2020.

Jacksonville is also home to three state-run institutions, including the Illinois School for the Deaf, the Illinois School for the Visually Impaired, and the Jacksonville Correctional Center. Lincoln Land Community College's Western Region Education Center is also located in Jacksonville.

Jacksonville is home to three high schools, two private and one public, including Routt Catholic High School. Jacksonville School District 117 provides education for the city and much of the county, with six elementary schools, one middle school, and one high school, Jacksonville High School.

== Culture ==
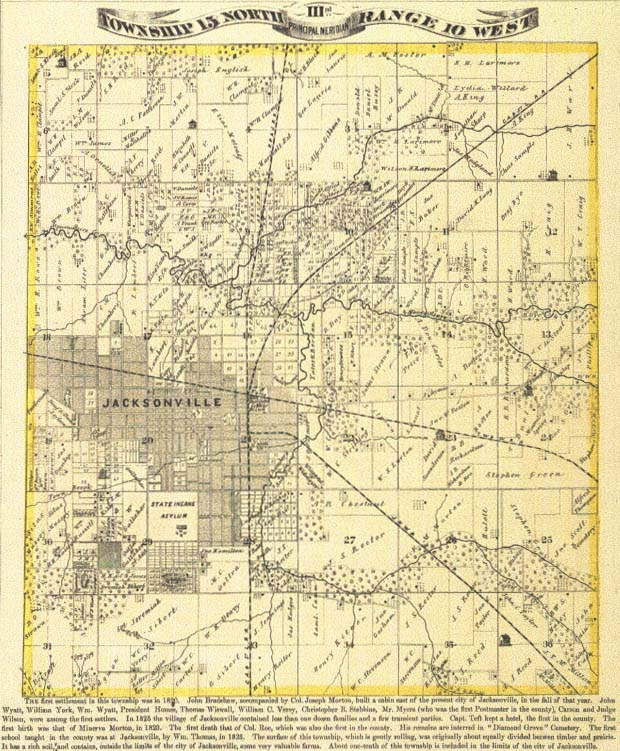
An atlas map from 1872 showing Portuguese landowners living near Jacksonville

In 2005, Sufjan Stevens released Illinois, a concept album making reference to various people and places associated with the state. Its fifth track, "Jacksonville", refers to various landmarks in the town, such as Nichols Park. It also contains a story about A. W. Jackson, a "colored preacher" urban legend supposes the town is named after, as well as President Andrew Jackson (President from 1829 to 1837) after whom the town's officials say it is actually named.

The Grammy-winning album Stones in the Road by singer-songwriter Mary Chapin Carpenter features the song "John Doe #24", which describes a series of events that occurred in Jacksonville relating to the person on whose life the song is based. The song tells the story of a blind and deaf man who was found wandering the streets in Jacksonville in 1945. The man was hospitalized for diabetes and kept in various institutions until he died nearly 50 years later in 1993. During his 48 years of institutionalization, nobody ever found out his name, nor did anyone who knew or was related to him come to Jacksonville to establish his identity. It was speculated that he was originally from New Orleans, but this was never verified. Likewise, how he came to Jacksonville remains a mystery to this day.

Cultural offerings include the Jacksonville Symphony Orchestra, the Jacksonville Theatre Guild, the Art Association of Jacksonville and its David Strawn Art Gallery, as well as many public events and activities hosted by MacMurray College and Illinois College. Recent additions to the cultural scene include the Imagine Foundation and the Eclectic art gallery, both located in the city's downtown area. The Jacksonville Area Museum, located just outside the downtown area, is home to many historical artifacts and is the repository of the MacMurray College Archive collection.

Jacksonville also holds the unusual distinction of having a large number of pipe organs for a city of its size – eleven in all – found at various local churches, as well as both of its four-year colleges.

A notable Portuguese American community has existed on the outskirts of Jacksonville since the nineteenth century. The origins of this community can be traced to 1838, when a Scottish reverend named Robert Reid Kalley visited the Portuguese island of Madeira and converted a number of the locals to Protestantism. These Madeiran Protestants faced discrimination and alienation due to being Protestant in a largely Catholic community, causing the converts to relocate from Madeira to the Caribbean island of Trinidad, before coming to the United States in 1849 and settling near Jacksonville.

== Media ==
The city's daily newspaper, the Jacksonville Journal-Courier, is the oldest continuously published newspaper in Illinois (since 1830).

The city also has a weekly newspaper, The Source.

Several radio stations operate in Jacksonville- WCIC 90.7-FM, WLDS 1180-AM, WEAI 107.1-FM, WJVO 105.5-FM, and WJIL, which simulcasts on 102.9-FM and 1550-AM.

NOAA Weather Radio station WXM90 transmits from Lynnville and is licensed to NOAA's Central Illinois National Weather Service Forecast Office at Lincoln and St. Louis, broadcasting on a frequency of 162.525 mHz (channel 6 on most newer weather radios, and most SAME weather radios). The station activates the SAME tone alarm feature and a 1050 Hz tone activating older radios (except for AMBER Alerts, using the SAME feature only) for hazardous weather and non-weather warnings and emergencies, along with selected weather watches, for the Illinois counties of Brown, Calhoun, Cass, Greene, Morgan, Pike, and Scott. Weather permitting, a tone alarm test of both the SAME and 1050 Hz tone features are conducted every Wednesday between 11 am and Noon.

== Infrastructure ==
=== Health care ===
Jacksonville Memorial Hospital, formerly known as Passavant Area Hospital, is the prime source of medical treatment in the area.

The Jacksonville Developmental Center, a state facility, operated here from 1851 to November 2012.

== Attractions ==
Jacksonville Speedway is a dirt racetrack on the Morgan County Fairgrounds that was first established in 1912. The track was originally a flat 1/2 mile track but was later replaced by the current banked 1/4 mile configuration. Though the racetrack was close to closing its doors in the early 2010s, it attracted the World of Outlaws racing series, which drew in fans and increased business. It has a grandstand that can seat 2,000 people.

Nichols Park is a park on the south side of Jacksonville. It has a playground, golf course, lake, and community pool.

During the month of December, The Farmers State Bank and Trust building in downtown Jacksonville can be seen displaying the "World's Tallest Advent Calendar" by displaying the 24 days leading up to Christmas in the windows of the east side of the building.
