= Springfield metropolitan area, Illinois =

Coordinates: 39°48′N 89°39′W

Springfield Metropolitan Area Springfield, IL Metropolitan Statistical Area
- Metropolitan Statistical Area
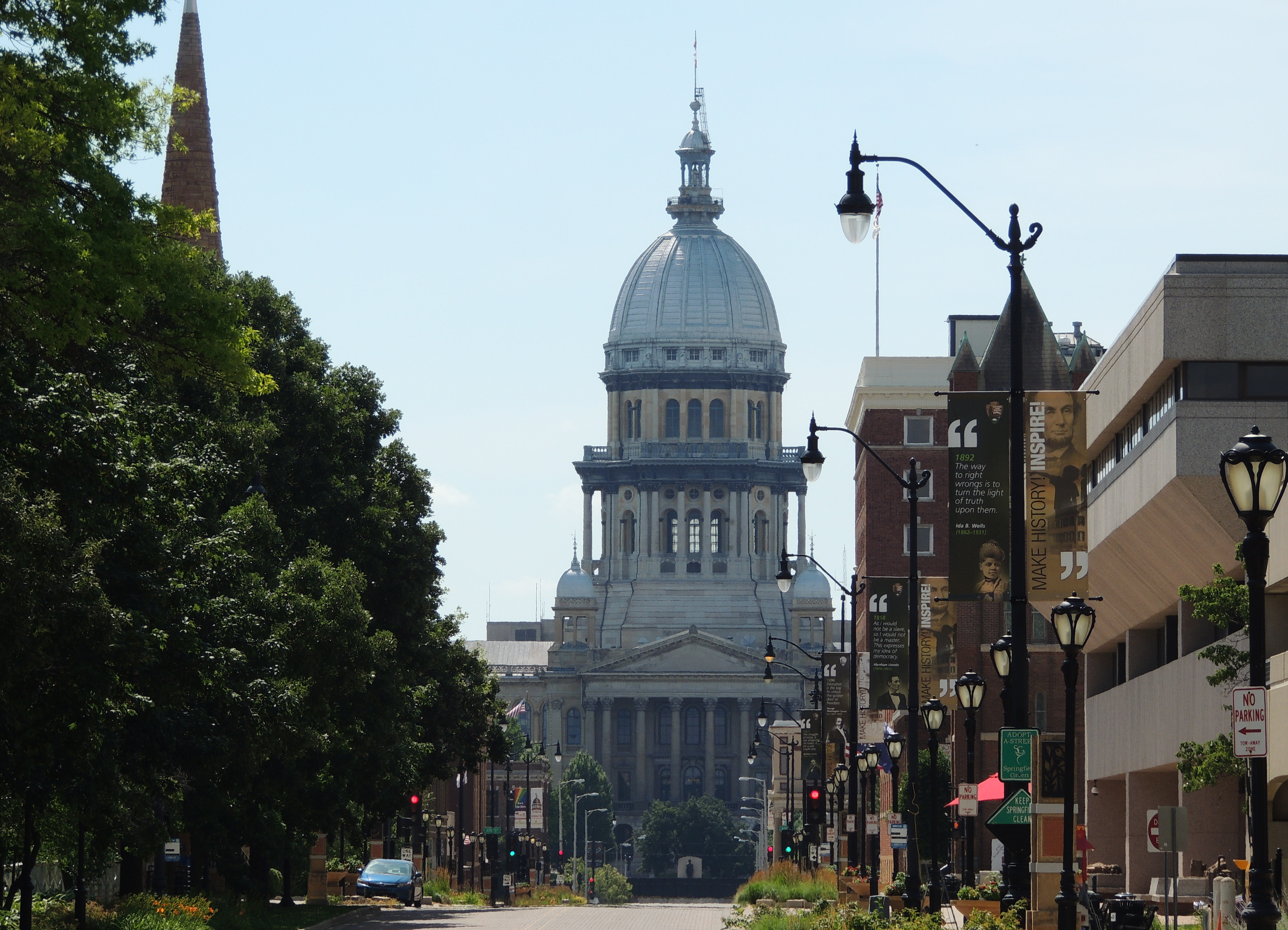
- Downtown Springfield and the Illinois State Capitol
Springfield–Jacksonville–Lincoln, IL CSA
City of Springfield
Springfield, IL MSA
Jacksonville, IL μSA
Taylorville, IL μSA
Lincoln, IL μSA
- Country: United States
- State: Illinois
- Time zone: UTC−6 (CST)
  - Summer (DST): UTC−5 (CDT)

The Springfield Metropolitan Statistical Area, as defined by the United States Census Bureau, is an area consisting of two counties in Central Illinois, anchored by the city of Springfield. As of the 2000 census, the MSA had a population of 201,437 (though a July 1, 2009 estimate placed the population at 208,182).

Metropolitan Springfield is southwest of Chicago, south of Peoria, southwest of Bloomington, west-southwest Champaign, and west of Decatur.

== Counties ==
=== Springfield, IL MSA ===
- Menard County
- Sangamon County

=== Jacksonville, IL μSA ===
- Morgan County
- Scott County

=== Lincoln, IL μSA ===
- Logan County

=== Taylorville, IL μSA ===
- Christian County

== Communities ==
=== Places with more than 100,000 inhabitants ===
- Springfield (Principal city)

=== Places with 10,000 to 20,000 inhabitants ===
- Chatham

=== Places with 1,000 to 10,000 inhabitants ===
- Athens
- Auburn
- Divernon
- Grandview
- Jerome
- Leland Grove
- New Berlin

- Pawnee
- Petersburg
- Riverton
- Rochester
- Sherman
- Southern View
- Virden (partial)
- Williamsville

=== Places with 500 to 1,000 inhabitants ===
- Greenview
- Illiopolis
- Loami
- Pleasant Plains
- Spaulding
- Tallula
- Thayer

=== Places with fewer than 500 inhabitants ===
- Berlin
- Buffalo
- Cantrall
- Clear Lake
- Curran
- Dawson
- Mechanicsburg
- Oakford

=== Unincorporated places ===
- Andrew
- Archer
- Atterbury
- Barclay
- Bates
- Bissell
- Bolivia
- Bradfordton
- Breckenridge
- Devereux
- Fancy Prairie
- Farmingdale

- Glenarm
- Hubly
- Ildes Park Place
- Lowder
- New City
- Old Berlin
- Riddle Hill
- Roby
- Salisbury
- Sicily
- Sweet Water
- Tice
- Toronto

== Townships (Sangamon County) ==
- Auburn
- Ball
- Buffalo Hart
- Capital
- Cartwright
- Chatham
- Clear Lake
- Cooper
- Cotton Hill
- Curran
- Divernon
- Fancy Creek
- Gardner
- Illiopolis

- Island Grove
- Lanesville
- Loami
- Maxwell
- Mechanicsburg
- New Berlin
- Pawnee
- Rochester
- Salisbury (former township)
- Springfield
- Talkington
- Williams
- Woodside

== Precincts (Menard County) ==
- Athens North
- Athens South
- Atterberry
- Fancy Prairie
- Greenview
- Indian Creek
- Irish Grove
- Oakford
- Petersburg East
- Petersburg North
- Petersburg South
- Rock Creek
- Sand Ridge
- Sugar Grove
- Tallula

== Major highways ==
- I-55
  - I-155
- I-72 / US 36
  - US 136
- US 51
- US 67

== Demographics ==
As of the census of 2000, there were 201,437 people, 83,595 households, and 54,361 families residing within the MSA. The racial makeup of the MSA was 88.11% White, 9.08% African American, 0.21% Native American, 1.04% Asian, 0.03% Pacific Islander, 0.37% from other races, and 1.16% from two or more races. Hispanic or Latino of any race were 1.04% of the population.

The median income for a household in the MSA was $44,777, and the median income for a family was $53,448. Males had a median income of $37,283 versus $27,912 for females. The per capita income for the MSA was $22,379.

== See also ==
- Illinois census statistical areas
