= Mike Murphy (Illinois politician) =

American politician

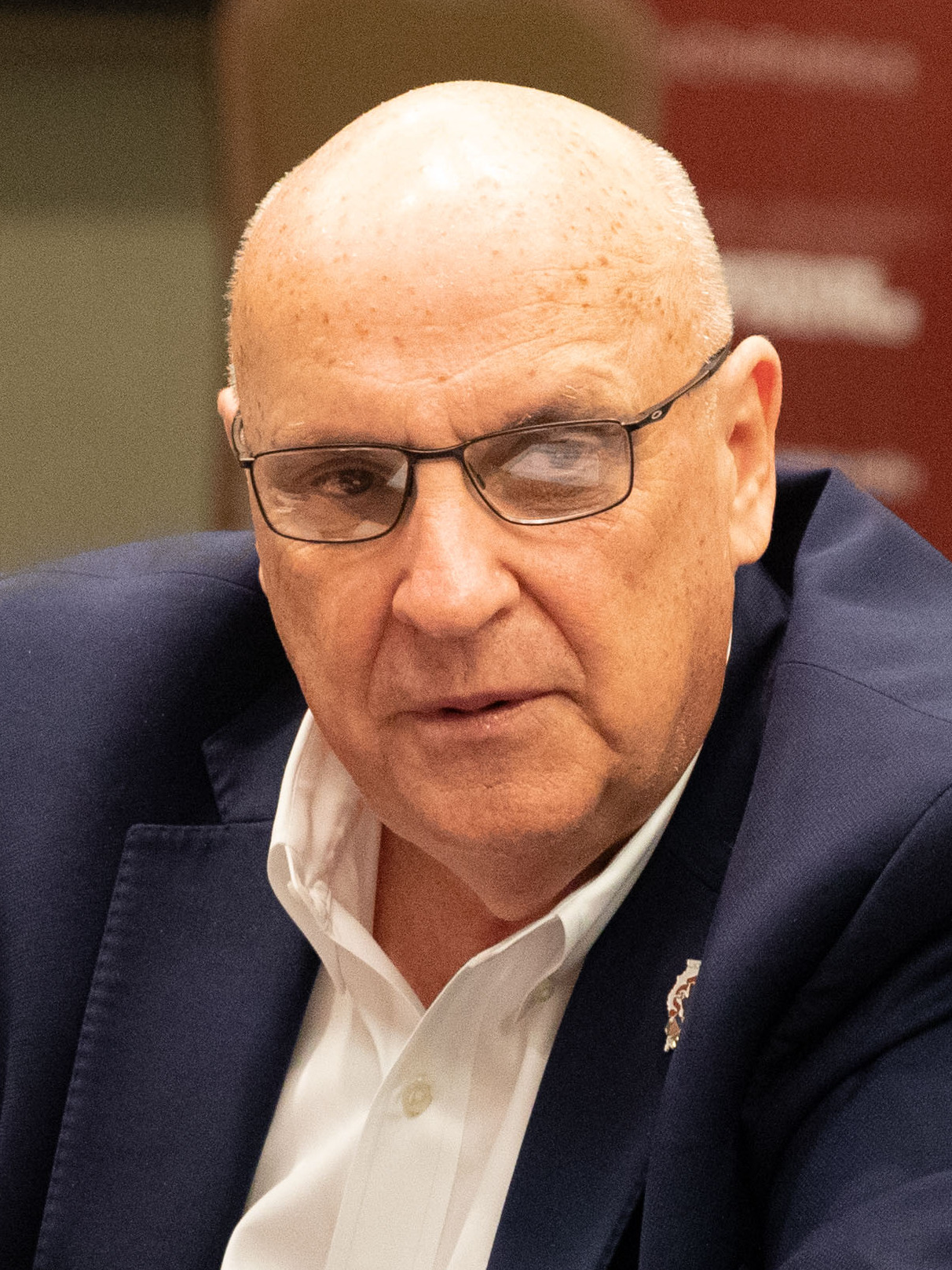

Member of the Illinois House of Representatives from the 99th district
- In office January 9, 2019 – November 30, 2021
- Preceded by: Sara Wojcicki Jimenez
- Succeeded by: Sandy Hamilton

Personal details
- Born: Springfield, Illinois
- Party: Republican
- Profession: Restaurateur

Mike Murphy is a former Republican member of the Illinois House of Representatives for the 99th district. The 99th district, located in the Springfield metropolitan area, includes the majority of the state's capitol Springfield as well as the communities of Auburn, Berlin, Chatham, Curran, Divernon, Leland Grove, New Berlin, and Thayer.

Murphy defeated Democratic candidate and retired Illinois State Police master sergeant Marc Bell in the 2018 general election. In the 2020 election, Murphy was unopposed.

On November 30, 2021, Murphy announced effective at 11:59 PM, he would resign from his position in the legislature. The next day, Murphy began his new role as the president and chief executive officer of the Greater Springfield Chamber of Commerce. A committee made up of the Sangamon County Republican chairwoman and two precinct committeepersons appointed Sandy Hamilton to the vacancy.

Murphy, the past owner of Charlie Parker's Diner, served on Divernon School Board and the Divernon Village Board prior to his election to the State House.

On January 9, 2026, Governor Pritzker announced he was appointing Murphy to serve as a member of the Illinois State Museum Board. The appointment is subject to confirmation by the Illinois Senate.

== Electoral history ==
Illinois 99th State House District Republican Primary, 2018
Party	Candidate	Votes	%
Republican	Mike Murphy	9,317	99.38
Republican	Steven Westerfield	58	0.62
Total votes		9,375	100.0

Illinois 99th State House District General Election, 2018
Party	Candidate	Votes	%
Democratic	Marc Bell	21,637	41.18
Republican	Mike Murphy	30,909	58.82
Republican hold			
