= WCVS-FM =

- Hillsboro, Illinois; United States
- Broadcast area: Springfield, Illinois
- Frequency: 99.7 MHz
- Branding: 99-7 CVS

Programming
- Format: Classic hits

Ownership
- Owner: Woodward Community Media - Springfield, IL
- Sister stations: WFMB, WFMB-FM, WMAY, WMAY-FM, WNNS, WQLZ

History
- First air date: 1991
- Former call signs: WXAJ (1991-2025)

Technical information
- Licensing authority: FCC
- Facility ID: 4738
- Class: B
- ERP: 50,000 watts
- HAAT: 150 meters (490 ft)
- Transmitter coordinates: 39.353°N 89.531°W
- Translator: 94.7 W234CC (Springfield)

Links
- Public license information: Public file; LMS
- Webcast: Listen Live
- Website: wcmspi.com/997-cvs/

WCVS-FM (99.7 FM) is a commercial radio station, licensed to Hillsboro, Illinois, and serving the Springfield metropolitan area. It is owned by the Neuhoff Corporation and broadcasts a classic hits radio format, known as "99.7 CVS". The radio studios and offices are on South 4th Street in Southern View, Illinois, using a Springfield address.

WCVS-FM has an effective radiated power (ERP) of 50,000 watts, the current maximum for most FM stations in Illinois. The transmitter is on County Road 900 East, off Front Street (Illinois Route 48) in Harvel, Illinois.

== History ==
The frequency first went on the air in 1991 as WXAJ and has been owned by Clear Channel Media + Entertainment, among other companies. It is now owned by Woodward Community Media.

From 2002 to March 5, 2017, the station aired a Contemporary hit radio (Top 40/CHR) format as "99.7 Kiss FM".

In January 2016, the station's sound evolved from the Top 40/CHR format by adding titles from the early 2000s and 1990s. It became an adult top 40, leaning toward rhythmic contemporary. To reflect the shift, WXAJ's slogan was changed from "All Of Today's Best Music" to "Springfield's #1 Best Hit Music Station".

On March 6, 2017, at 6 a.m, the station shifted to a hot adult contemporary format, significantly broadening the CHR playlist to include 1990s and 2000s hits and re-adopting a previously used "99.7 The Mix" moniker. The first song on "The Mix" was "The Rockafeller Skank" by Fatboy Slim.

On May 5, 2025 at 7:45am, after the "Mix" format signed off with "It's So Hard to Say Goodbye to Yesterday" by Boyz II Men and "Tearin' Up My Heart" by NSYNC, Woodward flipped the station to classic hits as "99.7 CVS", resurrecting the WCVS call letters that were previously used at 96.7 WIKC before it was sold to K-Love the previous year. The format launched with "I Love Rock & Roll" by Joan Jett & The Blackhearts.

On May 4, 2026, WCVS-FM began simulcasting on translator W234CC 94.7 FM Springfield.
