= Illinois Route 124 =

State highway in Sangamon County, Illinois, US

Illinois Route 124
- IL 124 highlighted in red

Route information
- Maintained by IDOT
- Length: 5.71 mi (9.19 km)
- Existed: 1940–present

Major junctions
- West end: IL 123 in Williamsville
- East end: I-55 BL in Sherman

Location
- Country: United States
- State: Illinois
- Counties: Sangamon

Highway system
- Illinois State Highway System; Interstate; US; State; Tollways; Scenic
← IL 123	→ IL 125

Illinois Route 124 (IL 124) is a 5.71-mile-long (9.19 km) state route in central Illinois. It has the distinction of being marked as an east–west route, but IL 124 runs entirely north–south for the majority of its route. IL 124 runs from IL 123 between Athens and Williamsville to the Business Loop for Interstate 55 (I-55) around Springfield at Sherman.

== Route description ==
Illinois 124 is a rural, two-lane surface street for its entire length.

== History ==
SBI Route 124 was what Illinois Route 29 is now from Springfield north to near Athens. In 1940 the route was changed to Illinois 29, and former Illinois Route 24 was changed to Illinois Route 124, running east from Athens to the current northern terminus, and south to the Business Loop. In October 2003, Illinois 123 was extended east to Williamsville, which eliminated the east–west portion of Illinois 124.

== Major intersections ==
The entire route is in Sangamon County.

Location	mi	km	Destinations	Notes
Fancy Creek Township	0.00	0.00	IL 123	Western terminus of IL 124
Sherman	5.71	9.19	I-55 BL (Sherman Boulevard) / Historic US 66	Eastern terminus of IL 124
1.000 mi = 1.609 km; 1.000 km = 0.621 mi
