= Robinson-Bonnett Inn =

- U.S. National Register of Historic Places
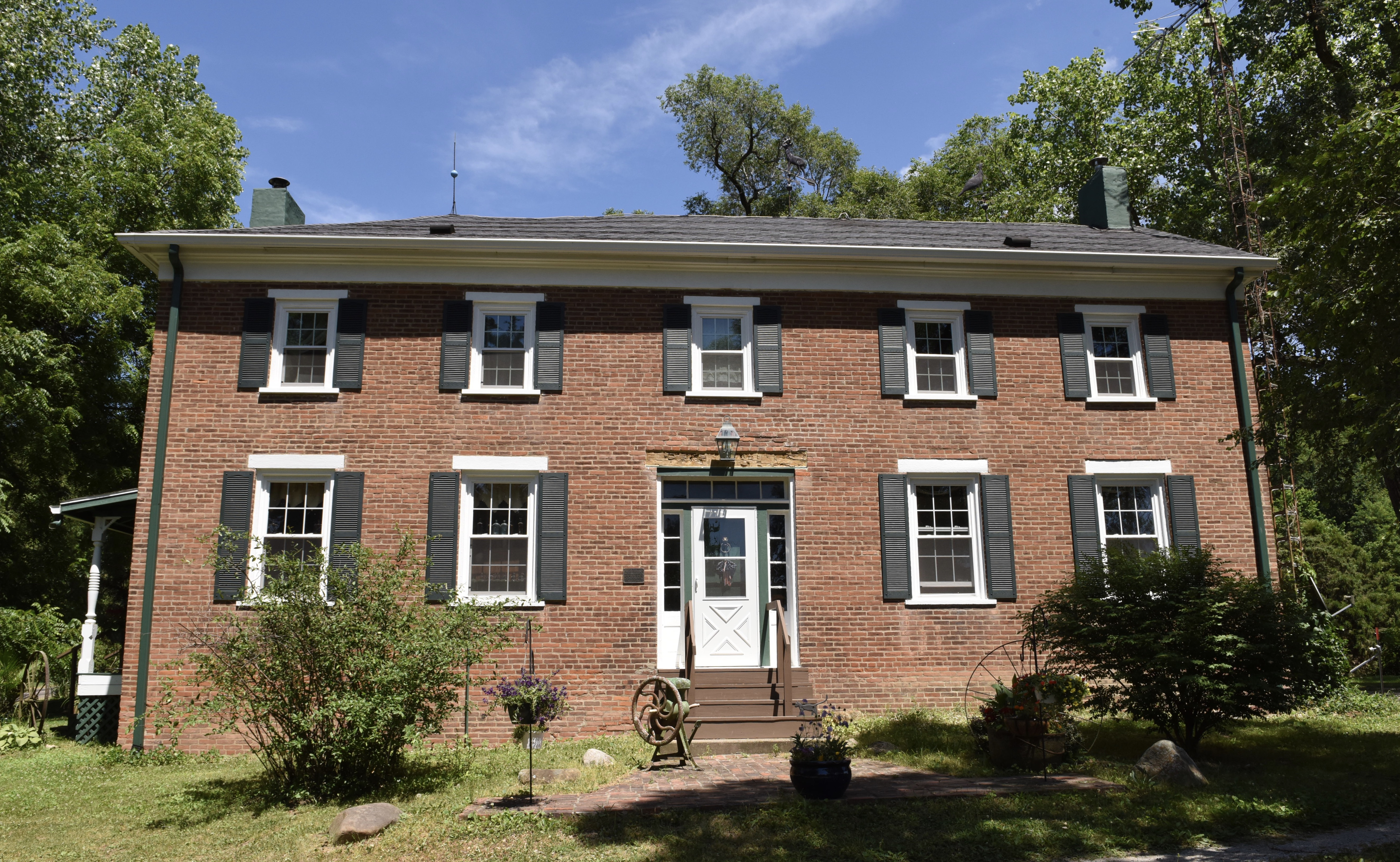

- Location within Illinois Location within the United States
- Location: Whites Crossing Rd. E of Clary Cr., Bobtown, Illinois
- Coordinates: 40°4′31″N 89°59′18″W
- Area: 0.6 acres (0.24 ha)
- Built: c. 1843
- Architectural style: Early Republic, Federal
- NRHP reference No.: 90001198
- Added to NRHP: August 3, 1990

The Robinson-Bonnett Inn is a historic inn located on Whites Crossing Road in Bobtown, Illinois. The inn was built circa 1843 by the Robinson family, which ran a gristmill and sawmill in the area, and John Bonnett. The inn was designed in the Federal style and is typical of inns of its period. While the inn originally served travelers to the Robinson family's mills, by the 1850s it was located along and served travelers on a stagecoach line. John Bonnett became the sole owner of the inn in 1849; Bonnett ran the inn until 1880 and continued to live in the area until 1910, even after the other residents of the area relocated to Oakford. The inn is now the only surviving inn of its era in Menard County.

The inn was added to the National Register of Historic Places on August 3, 1990.
