= Sara Wojcicki Jimenez =

American politician

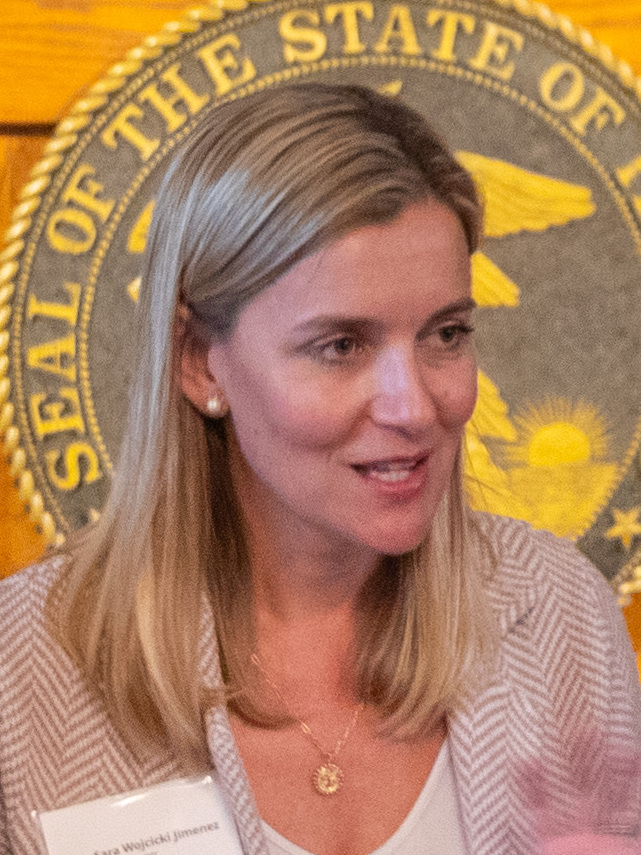
- Wojcicki Jimenez in 2025

Member of the Illinois House of Representatives from the 99th district
- In office November 2015 – January 2019
- Preceded by: Raymond Poe
- Succeeded by: Mike Murphy

Personal details
- Born: 1979 (age 46–47)
- Party: Republican
- Spouse: Carlos
- Children: Two
- Education: Southern Illinois University (BA); University of Illinois Springfield (MA)
- Profession: TV Reporter

Sara Wojcicki Jimenez (born 1979), was a Republican member of the Illinois House of Representatives representing the 99th district since her appointment in 2015. The 99th district includes Auburn, Berlin, Chatham, Curran, Divernon, Leland Grove, New Berlin, Thayer and the majority of the state's capitol Springfield.

She was appointed to replace Raymond Poe who resigned to become the Director of the Illinois Department of Agriculture. Prior to the appointment, she was the Chief of Staff to First Lady Diana Rauner and a television reporter.

Wojcicki Jimenez announced she would not seek reelection in 2018. She was succeeded by fellow Republican Mike Murphy.

On February 26, 2019, Senate Minority Leader Bill Brady appointed Wojcicki Jimenez to the Capitol Historic Preservation Board.
