= WNNS =

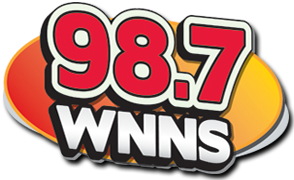
- Springfield, Illinois; United States
- Broadcast area: Springfield metropolitan area
- Frequency: 98.7 MHz
- Branding: 98.7 WNNS

Programming
- Format: Hot adult contemporary

Ownership
- Owner: Woodward Community Media - Springfield, IL
- Sister stations: WCVS-FM, WFMB, WFMB-FM, WMAY, WMAY-FM, WQLZ

History
- First air date: 1980

Technical information
- Licensing authority: FCC
- Facility ID: 38347
- Class: B
- ERP: 50,000 watts
- HAAT: 143 meters (469 ft)
- Transmitter coordinates: 39°41′59.00″N 89°46′55.00″W

Links
- Public license information: Public file; LMS
- Webcast: Listen live
- Website: wnns.com

WNNS (98.7 FM) is a commercial radio station licensed to Springfield, Illinois, United States, and serving the Springfield metropolitan area. The station is currently owned by Long Nine, Inc., and features a hot adult contemporary format. Studios and offices are located on North Third Street in Riverton, Illinois.

WNNS's transmitter is sited on Mansion Road in Curran, Illinois.

== History ==
The station signed on the air in 1980. It was formerly known as "Lite Rock 99" from the 1980s through the late 2000s.
