= WFMB =

WFMB may refer to:

- WFMB (AM), a radio station (1450 AM) licensed to Springfield, Illinois
- WFMB-FM, a radio station (104.5 FM) licensed to Springfield, Illinois
