= Bobtown =

Bobtown may refer to:

- Bobtown, Illinois
- Bobtown, Indiana
- Bobtown, Kentucky
- Bobtown, Pennsylvania
- Bobtown, Virginia
