= Illinois Route 123 =

State highway in central Illinois, US

Illinois Route 123
- IL 123 highlighted in red

Route information
- Maintained by IDOT
- Length: 33.72 mi (54.27 km)
- Existed: 1924–present

Major junctions
- West end: IL 125 in Pleasant Plains
- I-55 in Williamsville
- East end: Historic US 66 in Williamsville

Location
- Country: United States
- State: Illinois
- Counties: Sangamon, Menard

Highway system
- Illinois State Highway System; Interstate; US; State; Tollways; Scenic
← IL 122	→ IL 124

Illinois Route 123 (IL-123) is an east–west state highway in central Illinois, USA. 33.72 miles (54.27 km) long, it stretches from Historic Route 66 at Williamsville to Illinois Route 125 near Pleasant Plains.

== Route description ==
All of IL-123's route is contained within Sangamon and Menard counties. Major towns located on or adjacent to IL-123 include Athens, Petersburg, and Williamsville.

New Salem, the home of Abraham Lincoln in the 1830s, has been reconstructed as Lincoln's New Salem State Historic Site near Petersburg on IL-123.

== History ==
SBI Route 123 was what Illinois 123 is now, plus a road from Ashland south to Alexander at Interstate 72/U.S. Route 36. In 1999, Illinois 123 was truncated on its southern end to Illinois 125. In October 2003, Illinois 123 was extended east to Williamsville, replacing some of Illinois Route 124 in the process as well as all of Sangamon County Route 11.

== Major intersections ==
County	Location	mi	km	Destinations	Notes
Menard		0.00	0.00	IL 125 – Beardstown, Springfield	Western terminus of IL 123
Menard		9.4	15.1	IL 97 south	Southern end of IL 97 concurrency
Menard	Petersburg	14.4	23.2	IL 97 north	Northern end of IL 97 concurrency
Menard		21.3	34.3	IL 29 north – Peoria	Northern end of IL 29 concurrency
Sangamon	Fancy Creek Township	27.0	43.5	IL 29 south – Springfield	Southern end of IL 29 concurrency
Sangamon	Fancy Creek Township	30.6	49.2	IL 124 east – Sherman	Western terminus of IL 124
Sangamon	Williamsville	33.72	54.27	I-55 / Historic US 66 west – Springfield, Lincoln	West end of Historic US 66 overlap
Sangamon	Williamsville	34.0	54.7	Historic US 66 east – Lincoln	Eastern terminus of IL 123; east end of Historic US 66 overlap
1.000 mi = 1.609 km; 1.000 km = 0.621 mi: Concurrency terminus
