= WMAY-FM =

- Petersburg, Illinois; United States
- Broadcast area: Springfield metropolitan area
- Frequency: 97.7 MHz
- Branding: News Talk 97.7 WMAY

Programming
- Format: Talk radio
- Affiliations: ABC News Radio; Fox News Radio

Ownership
- Owner: Neuhoff Corp.; (Neuhoff Media Springfield, LLC)
- Sister stations: WCVS-FM, WFMB, WFMB-FM, WQLZ, WMAY, WNNS

History
- First air date: March 17, 1987
- Former call signs: WLUJ (1986–2001); WLGM (2001–2002); WYVR (2002–2007); WLCE (2007–2015); WQLZ (2015–2025)

Technical information
- Licensing authority: FCC
- Facility ID: 38346
- Class: B1
- ERP: 11,500 watts
- HAAT: 147 meters (482 ft)
- Transmitter coordinates: 39°38′38″N 89°30′51″W
- Repeater: 970 WMAY (Springfield)

Links
- Public license information: Public file; LMS
- Webcast: Listen live
- Website: WMAY.com

WMAY-FM (97.7 FM) is a commercial radio station licensed to Petersburg, Illinois, United States, serving the Springfield metropolitan area. Along with WMAY (970 AM), the two stations jointly simulcast a talk radio format and are owned by Neuhoff Corporation. The studios are on North Third Street in Riverton, Illinois.

The transmitter is on Ginder Road in New City, Illinois, near the Sangchris Lake State Recreation Area.

== History ==
The station signed on the air in December 1968. It was 3,000-watt WTIM-FM, playing beautiful music and featuring local high school sports events. It was the FM counterpart to WTIM (AM 1410, now WIHM) which was a daytimer. From 1975 to 1983, the FM station was WEEE (known as "Triple E" and later "W-3-E") with a variety of contemporary music formats, starting as adult contemporary then changing to "Rock 'n' Gold" (an AC/oldies hybrid) and then to album oriented rock. As an AOR station, the station first began to attract an audience in the Springfield market and was drawing much of its advertising revenue from there.

WEEE was sold in 1984 and the new owners changed the format to country music as WTJY. The station was sold again two years later and the format became satellite-fed AC. In 1990, WTJY took on a dayparted format with AAA/Rock mix during the day and a hard-rock/Heavy Metal mix at night. The station also featured the "Todd & Joe morning show" with Todd Ellis and Joe Swank, both of whom went on to work at WKCM/WLME in Hawesville, KY/Tell City, Indiana after the station sale in 1993. The station also featured Rick Elliott music director and afternoon host, later left to become Operations Manager of WJVO/WJIL in Jacksonville, IL, and Shawn Balint, who went by the handle of "Doc Rock".

Ownership of WTIM and WTJY became separate in 1993 (thanks to deregulation making it possible for Springfield "clusters" to add a station), with WTJY going to Mid-West Family Broadcast Group to become part of the company's Springfield station cluster as WQLZ. The station also was granted a power increase to 11,500 watts and a tower relocation into Sangamon County to get city-grade coverage of Springfield without relinquishing city-grade coverage of Taylorville. Ellis was on the new WQLZ for a time and Balint remained with WTIM. Meanwhile, WTIM later gained a new FM sister to serve Taylorville in 94.3 WMKR, and moved to its current frequency of 97.3 in 1996 while a Catholic religious broadcaster took over the AM 1410 signal.

During the 1990s, WQLZ was the only radio station in the Central Illinois area with live DJs 24 hours a day, featuring "Ray Lytle's Morning Disaster" hosted by Ray Lytle with his brother Bodine, as well as Jim the Photographer, Mikey, Shawn Balint (who returned to the frequency sometime in the decade), Rocky, Mychelle the Weather Babe, Brando and Rich, Marvin, Larz, and others. In 2006, Balint went on to the St. Louis market, Mikey left radio, and in November 2007, Jim the Photographer died in his home.

On August 24, 2015, WQLZ began temporarily simulcasting on WLCE, which became the new home for WQLZ on September 4. On that day, 92.7 began stunting with TV theme songs as "TV 93" and changed its call sign to WUSW-FM. On the 8th, 92.7 flipped to country as "92.7 US Country". The call sign WUSW was briefly moved to 1670 AM in Madison, WI, until WUSW-FM assumed the call sign on the 22nd.

On August 28, 2020, Midwest Family announced that WUSW would drop its country format and begin simulcasting WMAY on September 1. The addition of 92.7 expanded WMAY’s FM coverage to areas to the south and east of Springfield. The station changed its call letters to WMAY-FM, effective February 10, 2021.

On June 2, 2025, WQLZ announced on their social media accounts the station will be returning to the 92.7 FM frequency on July 1, 2025. A callsign swap form was filed with the FCC with the WMAY-FM call letters moving to 97.7 FM.

== Programming ==
Patrick Finkston is WMAY's lone local personality, hosting the station's morning show. The rest of the weekday schedule is nationally syndicated talk programs.
