= WIKC =

Radio station in Virden–Springfield, Illinois

WKIC
- Virden, Illinois; United States
- Broadcast area: Springfield metropolitan area
- Frequency: 96.7 MHz
- Branding: K-Love

Programming
- Format: Christian adult contemporary
- Affiliations: K-Love

Ownership
- Owner: Educational Media Foundation

History
- First air date: 1982; 44 years ago (as WRVI)
- Former call signs: WRVI (1982–1992); WCVS-FM (1992-2025)

Technical information
- Licensing authority: FCC
- Facility ID: 70275
- Class: A
- ERP: 6,000 watts
- HAAT: 100 meters (330 ft)
- Transmitter coordinates: 39°38′2.00″N 89°48′50.00″W

Links
- Public license information: Public file; LMS
- Webcast: Listen Live
- Website: klove.com

WIKC (96.7 MHz) is a commercial FM radio station licensed to Virden, Illinois, and serving the Springfield metropolitan area. It broadcasts a Christian adult contemporary radio format, branded as "K-Love". The station is currently owned by Educational Media Foundation.

WIKC has an effective radiated power (ERP) of 6,000 watts. The radio studios are on South 4th Street in Southern View, Illinois, using a Springfield address. The transmitter is in Loami, Illinois, on Lead Line Road at Acorn Road.

== History ==
The station signed on as WRVI on March 15, 1982. It was the first station owned by Randal J. Miller whose company Virden Broadcasting owns 16 stations in the Midwest as of 2022. On October 5, 1992, the station changed its call sign to the current WCVS-FM after WCVS relocated from 1450 AM to 96.7 FM following the purchase of the 96.7 FM frequency by Neuhoff Media. (1450 AM is now the home of co-owned WFMB, a sports radio station.)

Following the change in call letters, WCVS-FM flipped formats to active rock, going by the name "The Rock @ 96-7".

On January 7, 2011, at midnight, WCVS-FM began stunting with all-Bruce Springsteen music. At noon, it changed formats to classic rock, branded as "96.7 The Boss". The first song on 96.7 The Boss was Takin' Me Back by the band Cheap Trick, founded in Rockford, Illinois.

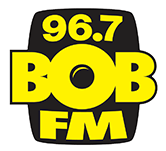
Previous logo

On October 2, 2017, WCVS-FM changed its format to adult hits, branded as "96.7 BOB FM".

On April 2, 2025, Woodward closed on a sale to acquire Springfield IL cluster. Due to ownership limits, the 96.7 frequency was sold to Educational Media Foundation, which then changed the format to Contemporary Christian under the K-Love brand.
