= Tallula, Illinois =

- Village
- Location in Menard County, Illinois
- Coordinates: 39°56′45″N 89°56′12″W
- Country: United States
- State: Illinois
- County: Menard

Area
  - Total: 0.53 sq mi (1.38 km^{2})
  - Land: 0.53 sq mi (1.38 km^{2})
  - Water: 0 sq mi (0.00 km^{2})
- Elevation: 623 ft (190 m)

Population (2020)
  - Total: 434
  - Density: 817.0/sq mi (315.43/km^{2})
- Time zone: UTC-6 (CST)
  - Summer (DST): UTC-5 (CDT)
- ZIP code: 62688
- Area code: 217
- FIPS code: 17-74379
- GNIS feature ID: 2399948

Tallula is a village in Menard County, Illinois, United States. It was founded in 1857 by William G. Greene. The population was 434 at the 2020 census, down from 488 in 2010. It is part of the Springfield, Illinois Metropolitan Statistical Area.

== History ==
William G. Greene, J. G. Greene, Richard Yates, T. Baker, and W. G. Spears laid out Tallula in late 1857. The name of "Tallula" was said to be an Indian word. The History of Menard & Mason Counties, Illinois credits Spears with the name, and notes that it was said to mean "dropping water", but nothing in the area is especially related to dropping water; the county tourist bureau claims that William G. Greene named the town, that it means "trickling water", and that it is related to "abundant springs in the area".

Tallula was incorporated as a village under Illinois' general municipal law in 1871 or 1872. William Greene and physician J. F. Wilson established the local bank in May 1877.

== Geography ==
Tallula is located in southwestern Menard County. It is at the center of Tallula Precinct. Illinois Route 123 passes through the southeast side of the village, leading northeast 10 miles (16 km) to Petersburg, the county seat, and south 4.5 miles (7.2 km) to Illinois Route 125 between Pleasant Plains and Ashland.

According to the U.S. Census Bureau, Tallula has a total area of 0.53 square miles (1.37 km^{2}), all land. The village is drained to the north by a tributary of Clary Creek, a north-flowing tributary of the Sangamon River and part of the Illinois River watershed.

== Demographics ==
Historical population
Census	Pop.	Note	%±
1870	339		—
1880	546		61.1%
1890	445		−18.5%
1900	639		43.6%
1910	742		16.1%
1920	761		2.6%
1930	583		−23.4%
1940	604		3.6%
1950	527		−12.7%
1960	547		3.8%
1970	643		17.6%
1980	681		5.9%
1990	598		−12.2%
2000	638		6.7%
2010	488		−23.5%
2020	434		−11.1%
U.S. Decennial Census

As of the census of 2000, there were 638 people, 238 households, and 175 families residing in the village. The population density was 1,207.4 inhabitants per square mile (466.2/km^{2}). There were 253 housing units at an average density of 478.8 per square mile (184.9/km^{2}). The racial makeup of the village was 99.06% White, 0.16% Native American, and 0.78% from two or more races. Hispanic or Latino of any race were 0.63% of the population.

There were 238 households, out of which 37.4% had children under the age of 18 living with them, 60.1% were married couples living together, 9.2% had a female householder with no husband present, and 26.1% were non-families. 21.8% of all households were made up of individuals, and 10.5% had someone living alone who was 65 years of age or older. The average household size was 2.68 and the average family size was 3.07.

In the village, the population was spread out, with 28.8% under the age of 18, 7.5% from 18 to 24, 29.3% from 25 to 44, 21.9% from 45 to 64, and 12.4% who were 65 years of age or older. The median age was 35 years. For every 100 females, there were 101.3 males. For every 100 females age 18 and over, there were 97.4 males.

The median income for a household in the village was $38,269, and the median income for a family was $38,864. Males had a median income of $31,250 versus $19,750 for females. The per capita income for the village was $16,088. About 12.6% of families and 18.9% of the population were below the poverty line, including 30.0% of those under age 18 and 3.6% of those age 65 or over.
