= WMAY (AM) =

Simulcasting WMAY-FM, Petersburg, IL
- Springfield, Illinois; United States
- Broadcast area: Springfield metropolitan area
- Frequency: 970 kHz
- Branding: News Talk 97.7 WMAY

Programming
- Format: Talk radio
- Affiliations: ABC News Radio; Fox News Radio

Ownership
- Owner: Neuhoff Corp.; (Neuhoff Media Springfield, LLC)
- Sister stations: WCVS-FM, WFMB, WFMB-FM, WMAY-FM, WNNS, WQLZ

History
- First air date: September 15, 1950

Technical information
- Licensing authority: FCC
- Facility ID: 38348
- Class: B
- Power: 1,000 watts (day); 500 watts (night)
- Transmitter coordinates: 39°51′42.00″N 89°32′32.00″W
- Translator: 102.5 W273DR (Springfield)

Links
- Public license information: Public file; LMS
- Webcast: Listen live
- Website: WMAY Online

WMAY (970 AM) is a commercial radio station licensed to Springfield, Illinois, United States, featuring a talk radio format simulcasting with WMAY-FM (97.7). The stations are owned by Mid-West Family Broadcasting and the license is held by Long Nine, Inc. WMAY's transmitter and studios are located on North Third Street in Riverton, Illinois.

Programming is simulcast on FM translator W273DR (102.5 FM) in Springfield.

== History ==
WMAY first signed on the air on September 15, 1950. It was owned by Lincoln Broadcasting. In 1963, the station was acquired by Springfield Broadcasting, a division of Stuart Stations. It aired a full service, middle of the road music format, using NBC Radio News for its world and national news coverage.

Mid-West Family Broadcasting bought the station in 1976, switching it to country music a short time later. In the early 1990s, WMAY went with an oldies format, and it flipped to its current talk radio format in 1995. Mid-West Family Broadcasting also owns local stations 98.7 WNNS-FM, 97.7 WQLZ and 92.7 WMAY-FM.

On August 28, 2020, Midwest Family announced that WUSW (now WMAY-FM) would drop its country format and begin simulcasting WMAY on September 1. The addition of 92.7 expanded WMAY's news/talk coverage to areas to the south and east of Springfield.

On April 25, 2022, WMAY changed its format from news/talk (which continued on WMAY-FM 92.7 Taylorville) to classic hits, branded as "102.5 The Lake".

On May 2, 2025, WMAY returned to news/talk, simulcasting WMAY-FM 92.7 Taylorville. The classic hits format shifted to co-owned 99.7 FM.
