= Loyd, Illinois =

- Unincorporated community
- Location within Illinois Location within the United States
- Coordinates: 39°54′53″N 89°51′15″W
- Country: United States
- State: Illinois
- County: Menard
- Elevation: 610 ft (190 m)
- Time zone: UTC-6 (Central (CST))
  - Summer (DST): UTC-5 (CDT)
- Area code: 217
- GNIS feature ID: 1748058

Loyd is an unincorporated community in Menard County, Illinois, United States. Loyd is 3.5 miles (5.6 km) northwest of Salisbury.
