= WLCE =

WLCE may refer to:

- WBUF, a radio station (92.9 FM) licensed to Buffalo, New York, United States, which held the call sign WLCE from 1997 to 1999
- WQLZ, a radio station (95.7 FM) licensed to Petersburg, Illinois, United States, which held the call sign WLCE from 2007 to 2015
- WRFF, a radio station (104.5 FM) licensed to Philadelphia, Pennsylvania, United States, which held the call sign WLCE from 1999 to 2002
