= WCVS =

WCVS may refer to:

== Callsign CVS in region W ==
- WIKC (FM 96.7 MHz), Virden, Illinois, USA; a radio station serving metropolitan Sprinfield, Illinois; holding the callsign "WCVS-FM" from 1992 to 2025
- WXAJ (FM 99.7 MHz), Hillsboro, Illinois, USA; a radio station serving metropolitan Sprinfield, Illinois; transitioning to the callsign "WCVS-FM" in mid-May 2025 from WXAJ
- WFMB (AM) (1450 kHz), Springfield, Illinois, USA; a radio station that transitioned from WCBS to WCVS in 1946, and from WCVS to WFMB in 1992; holding "WCVS" (AM; 1946–1992)

== Other uses ==
- West Central Valley Community School District (WCV, WCVS, WCV CSD), Iowa, USA

== See also ==
- WCV, the singular of WCVs
- KCVS, callsign CVS in region K
- CVS (disambiguation)
