= WCV =

WCV may refer to:

- waste collection vehicle, a garbage truck
- Weapon Carrier Vehicle, from Mildef International Technologies
- West Central Valley Community School District (WCV, WCVS, WCV CSD), Iowa, USA
- Washington Conservation Voters, an environmental conservation political action group in Washington State founded by Vim Wright
- WCV, an album code prefix used by World Circuit (record label)

== See also ==
- W105 from Mercedes-Benz
- WC5 (disambiguation)
- WCVS (disambiguation)
