= Springfield metropolitan area =

Springfield metropolitan area may refer to the following places:

- Springfield metropolitan area, Illinois
- Springfield metropolitan area, Massachusetts
- Springfield metropolitan area, Missouri
- Springfield metropolitan area, Ohio
