= William G. Greene =

American businessman

William G. Greene Jr.
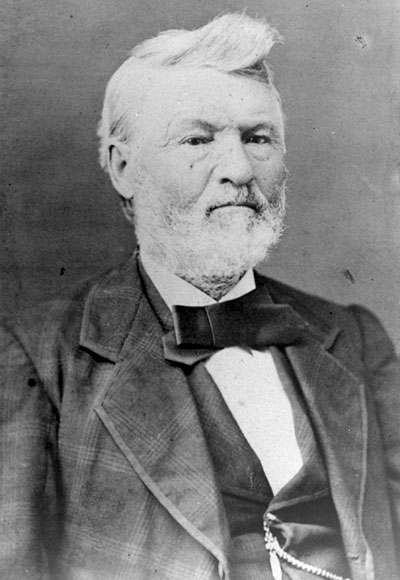
- Greene in 1860
- Born: 1812
- Died: 1894 (aged 81–82)
- Resting place: Greenwood Cemetery (East), Tallula, Illinois
- Other name: "Sticky Bill"
- Spouse: Louisa Greene
- Children: 9

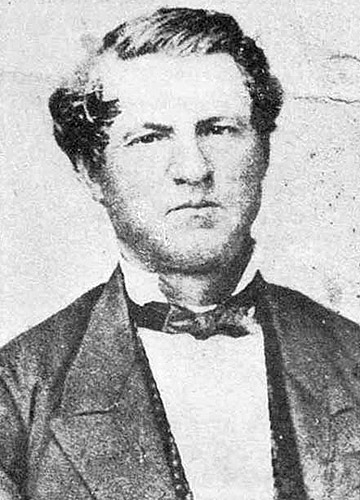
Greene, probably in the 1830s

William G. "Slicky Bill" Greene Jr. (1812–1894) was an American businessman who was a close friend of Abraham Lincoln. He did business in Menard County, Illinois. Greene founded Tallula, Illinois in 1857, and Greenview, Illinois is named after him.

Greene, along with his brother L.M. Greene, and William F. Berry, attended Illinois College in Jacksonville.

By September 1831, Greene's parents lived 2 miles (3 km) southwest of New Salem; Greene, then age 19, was hired by recent arrival Abraham Lincoln to assist at Lincoln's mill and store. In early January 1833, Greene bought the inventory of Reuben Radford's store in New Salem for $400; Lincoln drew up and witnessed the mortgage. The same day, Greene sold the same inventory to Lincoln and Berry, now Lincoln's store partner, for over $600. When Lincoln had a debt judgement entered against him in 1834, requiring Lincoln to surrender his horse, Greene turned in his own horse instead; this horse was probably the one Lincoln had paid him with in 1833. Lincoln eventually paid Greene back after becoming an attorney.

Greene was also an acquaintance of Richard Yates, and introduced Yates and Lincoln in New Salem; Yates became Governor of Illinois during the Civil War and Lincoln became president.

Greene and Lincoln remained friends; though Greene was a Democrat, Lincoln, as president, appointed Greene as internal revenue collector for the Peoria district. In Lincoln's New Salem, author Benjamin Thomas relates a story in which Lincoln introduced Greene to Secretary of State William H. Seward by saying that Greene had taught Lincoln grammar: When Greene later reminded Lincoln that all Greene had done was held the grammar book and checked the answers, and was not very good at grammar himself, Lincoln is said to have replied "Well, that was all the teaching of grammar I ever had."

Greene had nine children. By March 1853, Greene and his wife, Louisa Greene, lived on a farm near Havana, Illinois; their seventh child, Gaines Greene (1853–1918), was born there on March 3. Sons Carlin, McNult, Byrd, and Vance, and daughter Julia Greene, died before Gaines; sons Scott and Frank and daughter J. S. Noble outlived Gaines.

Within months after the birth of Gaines Greene, the family moved near Tallula, and William Greene spent most of his life in Tallula Precinct. Greene, along with Yates, J. G. Greene, T. Baker, and W. G. Spears, laid out the village of Tallula itself in late 1857. William Greene and physician J. F. Wilson established the local bank in May 1877.

Greenview was laid out in October 1857. It was named after William Greene because he convinced the railroad to come through the town: located on the Chicago, Alton & St. Louis Railroad, Greenview was incorporated by a special act of the Illinois General Assembly in May 1869.

Greene died on June 30, 1894, and is buried in Greenwood Cemetery (East) in Tallula.
