= Old Salem Chautauqua, Illinois =

- Unincorporated community
- Location within Illinois Location within the United States
- Coordinates: 39°59′32″N 89°50′07″W
- Country: United States
- State: Illinois
- County: Menard
- Elevation: 512 ft (156 m)
- Time zone: UTC-6 (Central (CST))
  - Summer (DST): UTC-5 (CDT)
- Area code: 217
- GNIS feature ID: 415054

Old Salem Chautauqua is an unincorporated community in Menard County, Illinois, United States. Old Salem Chautauqua is located on the Sangamon River, 1.5 miles (2.4 km) southeast of Petersburg.
