= Lewisburg, Illinois =

- Unincorporated community
- Location within Illinois Location within the United States
- Coordinates: 39°58′12″N 89°49′57″W
- Country: United States
- State: Illinois
- County: Menard
- Elevation: 518 ft (158 m)
- Time zone: UTC-6 (Central (CST))
  - Summer (DST): UTC-5 (CDT)
- Area code: 217
- GNIS feature ID: 411976

Lewisburg is an unincorporated community in Menard County, Illinois, United States. Lewisburg is located on the Sangamon River, 3 miles (4.8 km) south-southeast of Petersburg.
