= WFMB-FM =

Coordinates: 39°45′36″N 89°39′5″W

- Springfield, Illinois; United States
- Broadcast area: Central Illinois
- Frequency: 104.5 MHz
- Branding: 104.5 WFMB

Programming
- Format: Country music

Ownership
- Owner: Woodward Community Media - Springfield, IL
- Sister stations: WCVS-FM, WFMB, WMAY, WMAY-FM, WNNS, WQLZ

History
- First air date: July 1965
- Former call signs: WFMB (1965–1991)

Technical information
- Licensing authority: FCC
- Facility ID: 48331
- Class: B
- ERP: 43,000 watts
- HAAT: 131 meters (430 ft)

Links
- Public license information: Public file; LMS
- Webcast: Listen live
- Website: www.wfmb.com

WFMB-FM (104.5 FM) is a commercial radio station licensed to Springfield, Illinois, United States. It broadcasts a country music format and is owned by Neuhoff Corp., through licensee Neuhoff Media Springfield, LLC. WFMB-FM's studios and transmitter are sited on South 4th Street in Southern View, Illinois, using a Springfield address.

== History ==
The station signed on the air in July 1965. The original call sign was simply WFMB. The "-FM" suffix was added in 1991 just before its AM counterpart took the WFMB call letters. The station's studios and transmitter were located at the First National Bank Building at 5th and Adams. The station was owned by Capital Broadcasting. In 1972, the station's studios and transmitter were moved to the Myers Brothers Building.

In 1980, the station was sold to Springfield Advertising Co. for $1,275,000. In 1981, the station moved to its current location on the 3000 block of South 4th Street.

In 1989, the station was sold to Neuhoff Broadcasting, along with AM 1450 WCVS, for $4,250,000. In 1996, the station was sold to Patterson Broadcasting. After a series of acquisitions, Patterson Broadcasting became part of Clear Channel Communications. In 2007, as Clear Channel was selling most of its stations in smaller markets, Neuhoff bought back the Springfield stations the company had sold, including WFMB-FM.

The station has long aired a country music format. It was originally automated and added live disc jockeys in the 1980s.
