= Cantrall, Illinois =

Cantrall
- Village
- Location of Cantrall in Sangamon County, Illinois.
- Coordinates: 39°56′07″N 89°40′44″W
- Country: United States
- State: Illinois
- County: Sangamon

Area
  - Total: 0.25 sq mi (0.65 km^{2})
  - Land: 0.25 sq mi (0.65 km^{2})
  - Water: 0 sq mi (0.00 km^{2})
- Elevation: 587 ft (179 m)

Population (2020)
  - Total: 144
  - Density: 575.6/sq mi (222.23/km^{2})
- Time zone: UTC−6 (CST)
  - Summer (DST): UTC−5 (CDT)
- Zip code: 62625
- Area code: 217
- FIPS code: 17-11033
- GNIS feature ID: 2397547

Cantrall is a village in Sangamon County, Illinois, United States. The population was 144 at the 2020 census, up from 139 in 2010. It is part of the Springfield, Illinois Metropolitan Statistical Area.

== Geography ==
According to the 2010 census, Cantrall has a total area of 0.26 square miles (0.67 km^{2}), all land.

== Demographics ==
Historical population
Census	Pop.	Note	%±
1900	396		—
1910	318		−19.7%
1920	187		−41.2%
1930	170		−9.1%
1940	179		5.3%
1950	145		−19.0%
1960	115		−20.7%
1970	138		20.0%
1980	141		2.2%
1990	123		−12.8%
2000	139		13.0%
2010	139		0.0%
2020	144		3.6%
U.S. Decennial Census

As of the census of 2000, there were 139 people, 53 households, and 40 families residing in the village. The population density was 545.3 inhabitants per square mile (210.5/km^{2}). There were 55 housing units at an average density of 215.8 per square mile (83.3/km^{2}). The racial makeup of the village was 99.28% White, and 0.72% Asian.

There were 53 households, out of which 43.4% had children under the age of 18 living with them, 66.0% were married couples living together, 3.8% had a female householder with no husband present, and 24.5% were non-families. 22.6% of all households were made up of individuals, and 11.3% had someone living alone who was 65 years of age or older. The average household size was 2.62 and the average family size was 3.08.

In the village, the age distribution of the population shows 25.2% under the age of 18, 5.8% from 18 to 24, 30.9% from 25 to 44, 20.1% from 45 to 64, and 18.0% who were 65 years of age or older. The median age was 40 years. For every 100 females, there were 113.8 males. For every 100 females age 18 and over, there were 100.0 males.

The median income for a household in the village was $45,000, and the median income for a family was $45,417. Males had a median income of $49,375 versus $21,719 for females. The per capita income for the village was $21,610. There were none of the families and 1.4% of the population living below the poverty line, including no under eighteens and none of those over 64.

== Local attractions ==
The Sangamon River State Fish and Wildlife Area is located 4.5 miles (7.2 km) southwest of Cantrall, on the banks of the Sangamon River.

== Notable person ==
- Carl Vandagrift, infielder for the Indianapolis Hoosiers; born in Cantrall
