= County island =

Unincorporated area within a county

A county island is a small or large portion of an unincorporated area that is within the jurisdiction of a county, usually surrounded by adjacent areas that are incorporated into a municipality. On maps, these geopolitical anomalies will form jagged or complex borders and 'holes' in the city limits. Generally found more frequently in the western United States, county islands form in areas of expansion when previously smaller cities will annex and incorporate more land into their jurisdiction. If residents or landowners in a particular unincorporated area do not vote to incorporate with the surrounding city, the area remains unincorporated. The formation of a county island usually follows stages where it will come into being on the edge of an incorporated area, and as more territory is incorporated, be cut off from the rest of the unincorporated area within the county. These areas are not actually exclaves by definition, because they are simply unincorporated outside of a surrounding city.

== Description ==
Residents in county islands may resist annexation for a variety of reasons. Generally, people living on county islands have agricultural livelihoods which could come under threat if they incorporated; the risk of eminent domain seizure of their land is greater should they incorporate into a city that is quickly enveloping all available land for development in “urban sprawl”. Other times, the real estate of a county island is owned by one or a small number of owners who live elsewhere, and have no interest in annexation, or who intentionally hold onto the land inside a growing metropolitan area to capitalize on land values going up drastically.

Because these patches of land are not incorporated into the city surrounding them, they usually fall under the jurisdiction of the county in which they are located. This can create problems if a county island is itself densely populated; they must rely on the parent county for services such as waste management, fire protection, and policing (with only county police or Sheriff having jurisdiction). Situations which beg the surrounding city to provide emergency services to these unincorporated areas, both in their own self-interest and at the behest of those needing them. Other problems, such as dumping and other illegal activities that occur in county islands, can prove to be a blight on the surrounding areas.

== Arizona ==
County islands are a common feature of the fast-growth communities in fast growing areas with incorporated communities such as the Phoenix and Tucson metro areas. By law, 51% of landowners in an area as well as the city must approve annexation before it can take place.

== California ==
Some county islands are populated places, such as Olive, which is surrounded by Orange. Another common kind of county islands are cemeteries, such as Greenwood Memorial Park, which is surrounded by San Diego.

In some cities with many county islands, such as Fresno and Bakersfield, the nearest fire station is dispatched to an incident regardless of city lines. Also, in these areas, both city police and county sheriff may respond to calls together, but the area they are in will determine who is primary officer and who will take the report.

== Colorado ==
The city of Glendale, Colorado, is one of two areas belonging to Arapahoe County, but surrounded by the City and County of Denver. The other such area, including the neighborhoods of Holly Hills and Holly Ridge, is located just east of I-25 between Iliff Avenue and Hampden Avenue. According to the definition established in the article, Glendale is not precisely a county island because it is a city in its own right. However, the Holly Hills area is a county island.

At the county level, both of these areas are true exclaves because they are portions of one county surrounded by another county.

== Illinois ==
Many county islands were eliminated in Illinois by a 1986 state law that automatically annexed them into the surrounding city if that city had a coterminous township. Uniquely among the 22 affected cities, Springfield exercised its home rule powers to retroactively reverse this annexation. As a result, Springfield continues to have unincorporated enclaves including the neighborhoods of Laketown and Cabbage Patch.

Illinois also has some incorporated exclaves. Mount Greenwood Cemetery is completely surrounded by the city of Chicago but is incorporated into the neighboring suburb of Merrionette Park.

== Tennessee ==
Memphis surrounds the Bridgewater area of Shelby County, Tennessee, that is subdivision of Cordova, with I-40 as a north boundary, Whitten Road as a west boundary, Shelby Farms Park as a south boundary, and roughly between Appling and Cordova Rd as an east boundary. Memphis attempted to annex the entire area in the 2000s but decided to hold off because of a lack of funding and annexed only the portion between Appling Rd and Germantown Pkwy.

Chattanooga surrounds the St Elmo #2 political district of Hamilton County, Tennessee, which forms non-contiguous county island boundaries (some as small as an individual parcel). Chattanooga does not actively pursue annexation of this area as past attempts have resulted in significant landowner resistance; however, Chattanooga does allow individual landowners to voluntarily join their jurisdiction in exchange for access to city trash and police service; most residential homeowners do not consider this worth the additional 40% property tax burden. Voluntary annexation is usually initiated by business owners within the county, one reason being to lower insurance premiums for certain commercial activities.

Tennessee's 2nd congressional district
- Interactive map of district boundaries since January 3, 2023
- Representative: Tim Burchett

Due to three county islands near Sweetwater, Tennessee, Tennessee's 2nd congressional district is not geographically contiguous — rather it is politically contiguous, with exclaves "connected" despite being entirely-surrounded by Tennessee's 3rd congressional district.

== Texas ==
Two county islands exist at the eastern end of Grand Prairie, Texas; the islands house a drag strip and a small speedway which the city has chosen not to annex (as per Texas law the city would then be required to provide law enforcement to them).

== See also ==
- County (United States)
- County statistics of the United States
- Municipal corporation
- New England town and Local government in New Jersey (compare with)
