= Curran Township, Sangamon County, Illinois =

Coordinates: 39°44′32″N 89°45′55″W

Curran Township
- Township
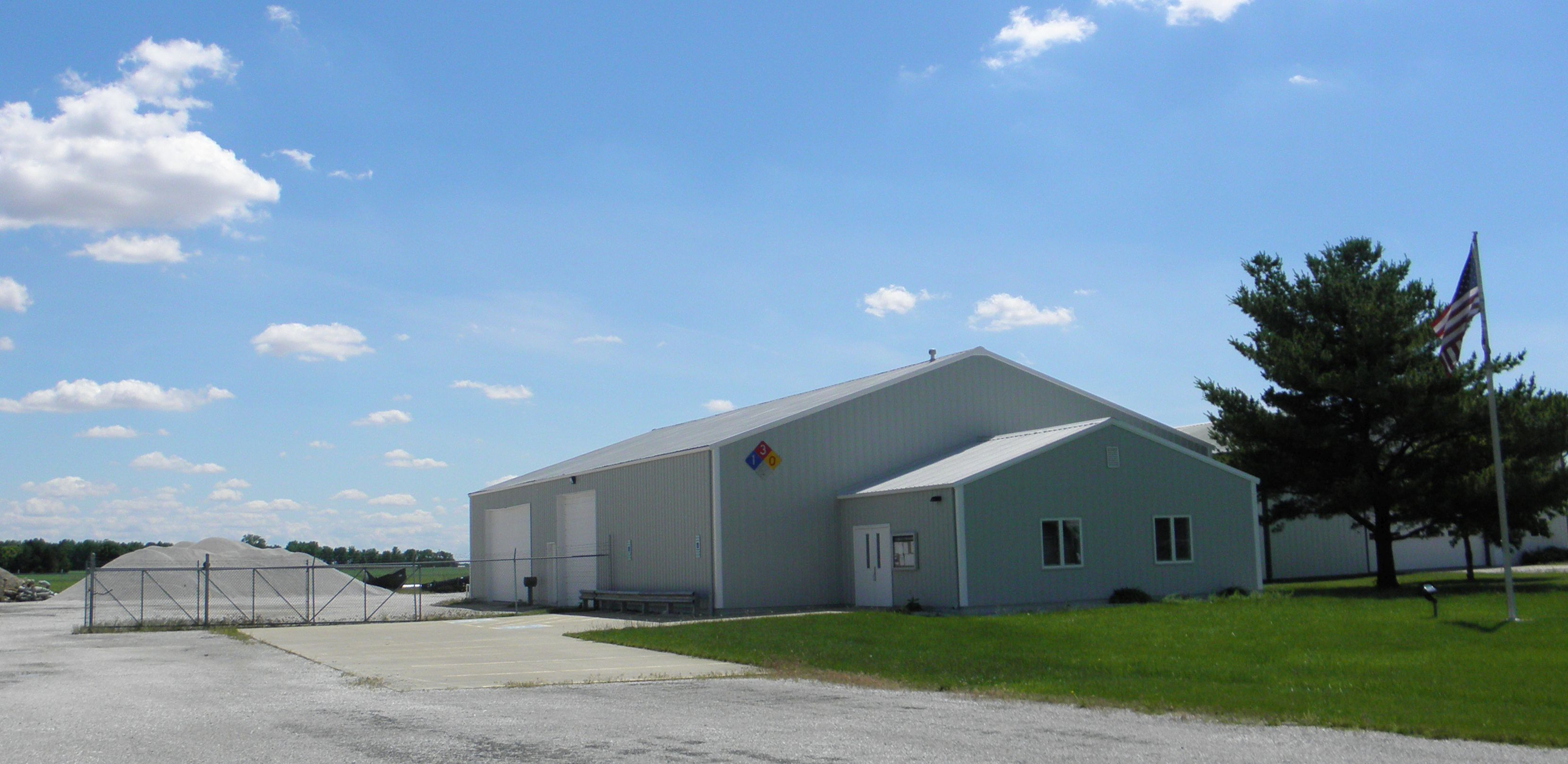
- Curran Township government building in Curran, Illinois

- Location in Sangamon County

- Sangamon County's location in Illinois
- Country: United States
- State: Illinois
- County: Sangamon
- Established: November 6, 1860

Area
  - Total: 28.02 sq mi (72.6 km^{2})
  - Land: 28.01 sq mi (72.5 km^{2})
  - Water: 0.01 sq mi (0.026 km^{2}) 0.04%

Population (2010)
  - Estimate (2016): 1,573
  - Density: 56.6/sq mi (21.9/km^{2})
- Time zone: UTC-6 (CST)
  - Summer (DST): UTC-5 (CDT)
- FIPS code: 17-167-18160

Curran Township is a township in Sangamon County, Illinois. As of the 2010 census, its population was 1,586, and it contained 662 housing units.

== Geography ==
According to the 2020 census, the township has a total area of 27.649 square miles (71.61 km^{2}), of which 27.639 square miles (71.58 km^{2}) (or 99.96%) is land and 0.01 square miles (0.026 km^{2}) (or 0.04%) is water.

Historical population
Census	Pop.	Note	%±
1870	1,000		—
1880	1,065		6.5%
1890	994		−6.7%
1900	1,023		2.9%
1910	1,001		−2.2%
1920	920		−8.1%
1930	898		−2.4%
1940	850		−5.3%
1950	751		−11.6%
1960	842		12.1%
1970	1,223		45.2%
1980	1,537		25.7%
1990	1,505		−2.1%
2000	1,678		11.5%
2010	1,586		−5.5%
2020	1,566		−1.3%

The township contains the entire incorporated community of Curran, and a very small portion of Chatham. The township originally corresponded to the entire survey township 15 North, Range 6 West of the third principal meridian, but owing to annexations into Capital Township due to the westward expansion of the City of Springfield, its area has been considerably reduced. In what was formerly the eastern part of the township, various small unincorporated enclaves remain in the township but are surrounded by Capital Township.
