= WC5 =

WC5 may refer to:

- Wing Commander: Prophecy, a 1997 videogame, the 5th videogame in the main-line Wing Commander series, variously referred to as WCP, WC5, WCV
- Stellar classification WC5, an astrophysical star class, a type of Wolf–Rayet star
- WC5, a subtype of C5 (classification) used in para-cycling for adaptive sports
- Whiston & Cronton 5 (polling district WC5), in St Helens South and Whiston (UK Parliament constituency)
- World Cup/Championship round 5, the 5th competition event of a seasonal world championship in sports

== See also ==
- WCV (disambiguation)
- WC (disambiguation)
