= Sandy Hamilton =

American politician

Member of the Illinois House of Representatives from the 99th district
- In office December 30, 2021 – January 11, 2023
- Preceded by: Mike Murphy
- Succeeded by: Randy Frese (redistricted)

Personal details
- Party: Republican
- Spouse: Bob Hamilton
- Children: 3
- Education: University of Illinois (BA)
- Occupation: Real Estate Broker
- Website: Senate campaign website

Sandy (Scholtens) Hamilton is an American politician and real estate broker who represented the 99th district in the Illinois House of Representatives.

== Early life ==
Sandra Hamilton (nee Scholtens) grew up in Woodridge, Illinois and attended Downers Grove North High School.

Hamilton was a scholarship athlete and letter winner at the University of Illinois Urbana-Champaign, where she was a member of teams that won three Big Ten championships and advanced to the Final Four in 1987 and 1988. The team now gives a Sandy Scholtens Award, which is given to athletes who embodies work ethic, attitude and teamwork.

Hamilton was a successful high school volleyball coach at private Catholic school Sacred Heart-Griffin High School in Springfield from December 2012 to May 2021. Her teams had 7 20-win seasons.

== Political career ==
On November 30, 2021, Republican incumbent Mike Murphy resigned from the legislature to serve as president and CEO of the Greater Springfield Chamber of Commerce. The Republican Representative Committee of the Republican Party of the 99th Representative District appointed Hamilton to the vacancy. She took office on December 30, 2021.

During the 102nd General Assembly, Representative Hamilton was a member of the following committees:

- Appropriations – General Service Committee (HAPG)
- Appropriations – Higher Education Committee (HAPI)
- Financial Institutions Committee (HFIN)
- Insurance Committee (HINS)
- State Government Administration Committee (HSGA)
- Transportation: Vehicles & Safety Committee (HVES)

Hamilton ran for the Illinois Senate from the 48th State Senate seat as the Republican nominee against Democratic candidate and incumbent Senator Doris Turner. Her term expired in January 2023.
