= Sangamon River State Fish and Wildlife Area =

Coordinates: 39.914°N 89.741°W

The Sangamon River State Fish and Wildlife Area, also and formerly known as the Sangamon County Conservation Area and the Sangamon River State Habitat Area, is a 127-acre (51-hectare) forest preserve located in Fancy Creek Township near the village of Cantrall in the U.S. state of Illinois. It is located on the banks of the Sangamon River, and preserves open space for visitors and residents of metropolitan Springfield, Illinois.

== Description ==
Topographically, the Sangamon River State Fish and Wildlife Area is a patch of central Illinois bluffland characterized by loamy hills and ravines on the bank of the Sangamon River. The trees are mostly oak and hickory, with a ribbon of bottomland softwoods, such as sycamore, along the river bank. Hunters use this public land to hunt coyote, deer, fox, mourning dove, quail, rabbit, raccoon, squirrel, turkey, and woodcock.

As of 2022, the Sangamon River State Fish and Wildlife Area is managed from nearby Chandlerville as a disjunct area of the Jim Edgar Panther Creek State Fish and Wildlife Area by its owner, the Illinois Department of Natural Resources.

The nearest limited-access highway exit is Exit 105 on Interstate 55, at the nearby town of Sherman.
