= Lake Petersburg, Illinois =

- Census-designated place
- Location within Illinois Location within the United States
- Coordinates: 39°58′59″N 89°51′54″W
- Country: United States
- State: Illinois
- County: Menard

Area
  - Total: 2.08 sq mi (5.39 km^{2})
  - Land: 1.81 sq mi (4.68 km^{2})
  - Water: 0.27 sq mi (0.71 km^{2})
- Elevation: 581 ft (177 m)

Population (2020)
  - Total: 740
  - Density: 409.6/sq mi (158.15/km^{2})
- Time zone: UTC-6 (Central (CST))
  - Summer (DST): UTC-5 (CDT)
- ZIP Code: 62675 (Petersburg)
- Area code: Area code 217
- GNIS feature ID: 2629866
- Website: lakepetersburg.org

Lake Petersburg is a census-designated place in Menard County, Illinois, United States. Its population was 740 as of the 2020 census. The unincorporated community centers on a small reservoir, which is used extensively by residents for recreation.

== Geography ==
Lake Petersburg is southwest of the center of Menard County, surrounding a reservoir of the same name, built in a valley that flows to the Sangamon River less than a mile to the east. Petersburg, the Menard county seat, is 2 miles (3 km) to the north.

According to the U.S. Census Bureau, the Lake Petersburg CDP has a total area of 2.08 square miles (5.39 km^{2}), within which the reservoir occupies 0.28 square miles (0.73 km^{2}), or 13.2% of the community's area.

== Demographics ==
Historical population
Census	Pop.	Note	%±
2010	719		—
2020	740		2.9%
U.S. Decennial Census
