= Fancy Prairie, Illinois =

- Unincorporated community
- Location within Illinois Location within the United States
- Coordinates: 39°59′51″N 89°35′58″W
- Country: United States
- State: Illinois
- County: Menard
- Elevation: 620 ft (190 m)
- Time zone: UTC-6 (Central (CST))
  - Summer (DST): UTC-5 (CDT)
- Area code: 217
- GNIS feature ID: 408265

Fancy Prairie is an unincorporated community in Menard County, Illinois, United States. Fancy Prairie is 4 miles (6.4 km) northwest of Williamsville.
