= Bobtown, Illinois =

- Unincorporated community
- Location within Illinois Location within the United States
- Coordinates: 40°04′34″N 89°59′17″W
- Country: United States
- State: Illinois
- County: Menard
- Elevation: 522 ft (159 m)
- Time zone: UTC-6 (Central (CST))
  - Summer (DST): UTC-5 (CDT)
- Area code: 217
- GNIS feature ID: 422483

Bobtown is an unincorporated community in Menard County, Illinois, United States. Bobtown is 2 miles (3.2 km) southwest of Oakford.

The Robinson-Bonnett Inn, which is listed on the National Register of Historic Places, is located in Bobtown.
