= Bradfordton, Illinois =

- Unincorporated community
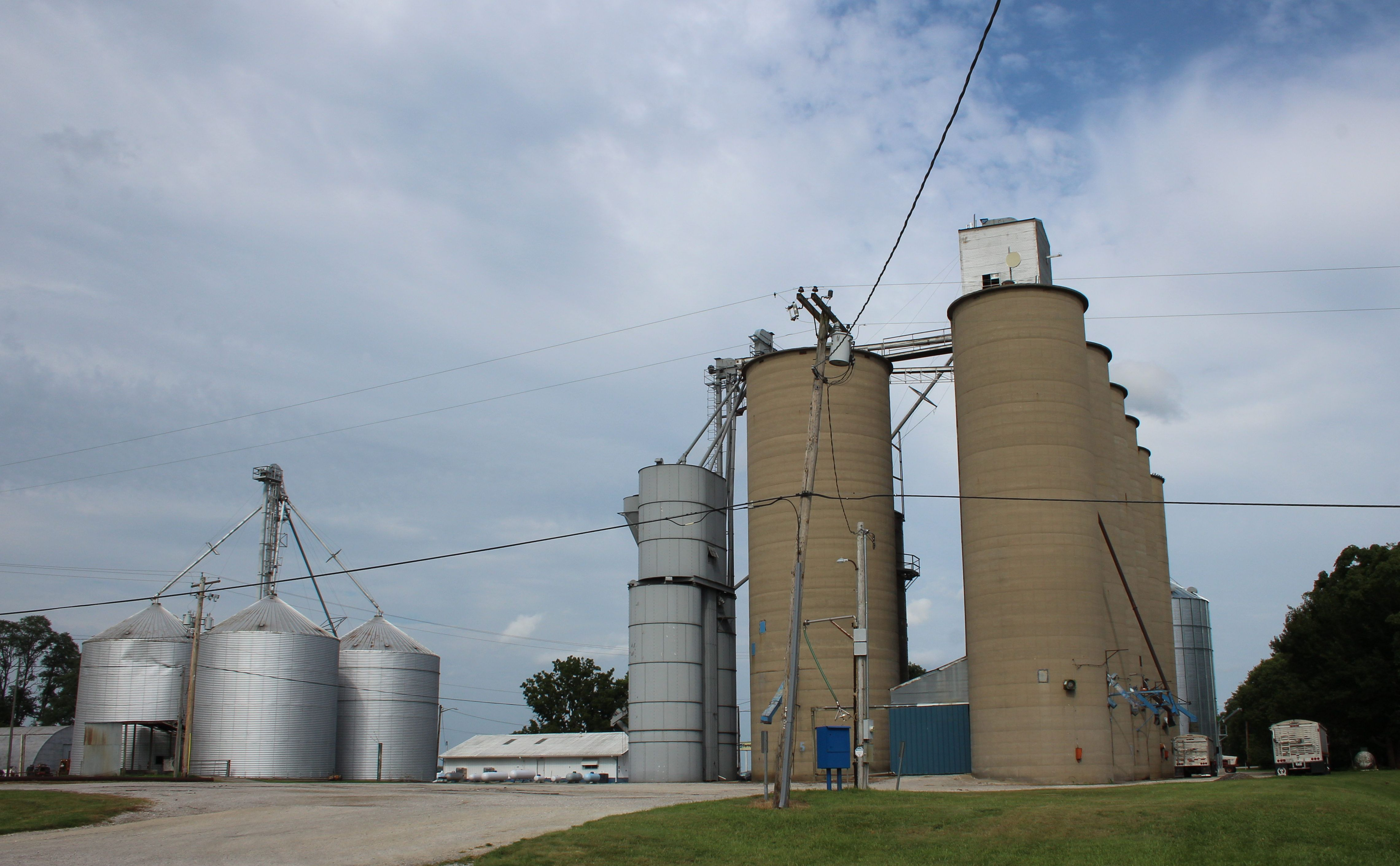
- Bradfordton grain elevator

- Location within Illinois Location within the United States
- Coordinates: 39°49′24″N 89°44′22″W
- Country: United States
- State: Illinois
- County: Sangamon
- Township: Sangamon
- Elevation: 591 ft (180 m)
- Time zone: UTC-6 (Central (CST))
  - Summer (DST): UTC-5 (CDT)
- Area codes: 217, 447
- GNIS feature ID: 422496

Bradfordton is a rural unincorporated community located in Gardner Township, Sangamon County, Illinois. It is located on Illinois Route 97, 4.5 miles (7 km) northwest of Springfield. The Bradfordton intersection is marked by a stoplight, the only one for miles in either direction, which was installed in 1999 due to concern over school bus safety.

The rural hamlet is the site of the Bradfordton Co-Op, a grain elevator.

== History ==
Bradfordton takes its name from early resident James M. Bradford, who served in the 12th Illinois General Assembly.

The community was once the site of a whistle stop on the Baltimore and Ohio Railroad line from Springfield to Beardstown. A post office was established at Bradfordton in 1876.
