= Atterberry, Illinois =

- Unincorporated community
- Location within Illinois Location within the United States
- Coordinates: 40°03′39″N 89°55′25″W
- Country: United States
- State: Illinois
- County: Menard
- Elevation: 597 ft (182 m)
- Time zone: UTC-6 (Central (CST))
  - Summer (DST): UTC-5 (CDT)
- Area code: 217
- GNIS feature ID: 403706

Atterberry is an unincorporated community in Menard County, Illinois, United States. Atterberry is located on Illinois Route 97, 5 miles (8.0 km) northwest of Petersburg.
