= Hubly, Illinois =

- Unincorporated community
- Location within Illinois Location within the United States
- Coordinates: 40°08′08″N 89°39′32″W
- Country: United States
- State: Illinois
- County: Menard
- Elevation: 518 ft (158 m)
- Time zone: UTC-6 (Central (CST))
  - Summer (DST): UTC-5 (CDT)
- Area code: 217
- GNIS feature ID: 422825

Hubly is an unincorporated community in Menard County, Illinois, United States. Hubly is 5 miles (8.0 km) southeast of Mason City.
