= Sweet Water, Illinois =

- Unincorporated community
- Location within Illinois Location within the United States
- Coordinates: 40°03′14″N 89°41′38″W
- Country: United States
- State: Illinois
- County: Menard
- Elevation: 604 ft (184 m)
- Time zone: UTC-6 (Central (CST))
  - Summer (DST): UTC-5 (CDT)
- Area code: 217
- GNIS feature ID: 419480

Sweet Water is an unincorporated community in Menard County, Illinois, United States. Sweet Water is 3 miles (4.8 km) southeast of Greenview.
