= WQLZ =

- Taylorville, Illinois; United States
- Broadcast area: Springfield, Illinois
- Frequency: 92.7 MHz
- Branding: 92.7 QLZ

Programming
- Format: Active rock

Ownership
- Owner: Woodward Community Media - Springfield, IL
- Sister stations: WCVS-FM, WFMB, WFMB-FM, WMAY, WMAY-FM, WNNS

History
- First air date: December 1968; 57 years ago (as WTIM-FM)
- Former call signs: WTIM-FM (1967–1975); WEEE (1975–1983); WTJY (1983–1993); WQLZ (1993-2015); WUSW-FM (2015); WUSW (2015–2021); WMAY-FM (2021–2025)

Technical information
- Licensing authority: FCC
- Facility ID: 56229
- Class: A
- ERP: 6,000 watts
- HAAT: 100 meters (330 ft)
- Transmitter coordinates: 39°54′35.00″N 89°43′1.00″W

Links
- Public license information: Public file; LMS
- Webcast: Listen live
- Website: wqlz.com

WQLZ (92.7 FM) is a radio station broadcasting an active rock format, licensed to Taylorville, Illinois, United States. The station serves the Springfield, IL area and is currently owned by Long Nine, Inc.

== History ==
The station began broadcasting March 17, 1987, and aired a Christian format as WLUJ. On August 10, 2001, the station's call sign was changed to WLGM. On February 12, 2002, the station's call sign was changed to WYVR. WYVR aired a modern rock format, branded "The River", "Springfield's Modern Rock". On February 17, 2007, the station's call sign was changed to WLCE, and the station adopted an adult album alternative format. The station was branded "Alice @ 97.7" "Springfield's Music Alternative".

On August 24, 2015, WLCE flipped to active rock, temporarily simulcasting 92.7 WQLZ in Taylorville, Illinois, as "Real Rock 97.7 QLZ", On September 4, WQLZ moved permanently to 97.7, and the station's call sign was changed to the current WQLZ.

On June 2nd, 2025, WQLZ announced on their social media accounts the station will be returning to the 92.7 FM frequency on July 1, 2025. A callsign swap form was filed with the FCC with the WMAY-FM call letters moving to 97.7 FM.

== Previous logos ==
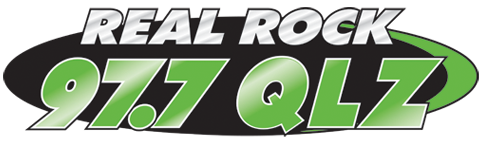
