= Woodside Township, Sangamon County, Illinois =

Coordinates: 39°44′32″N 89°39′31″W

Woodside Township
- Township
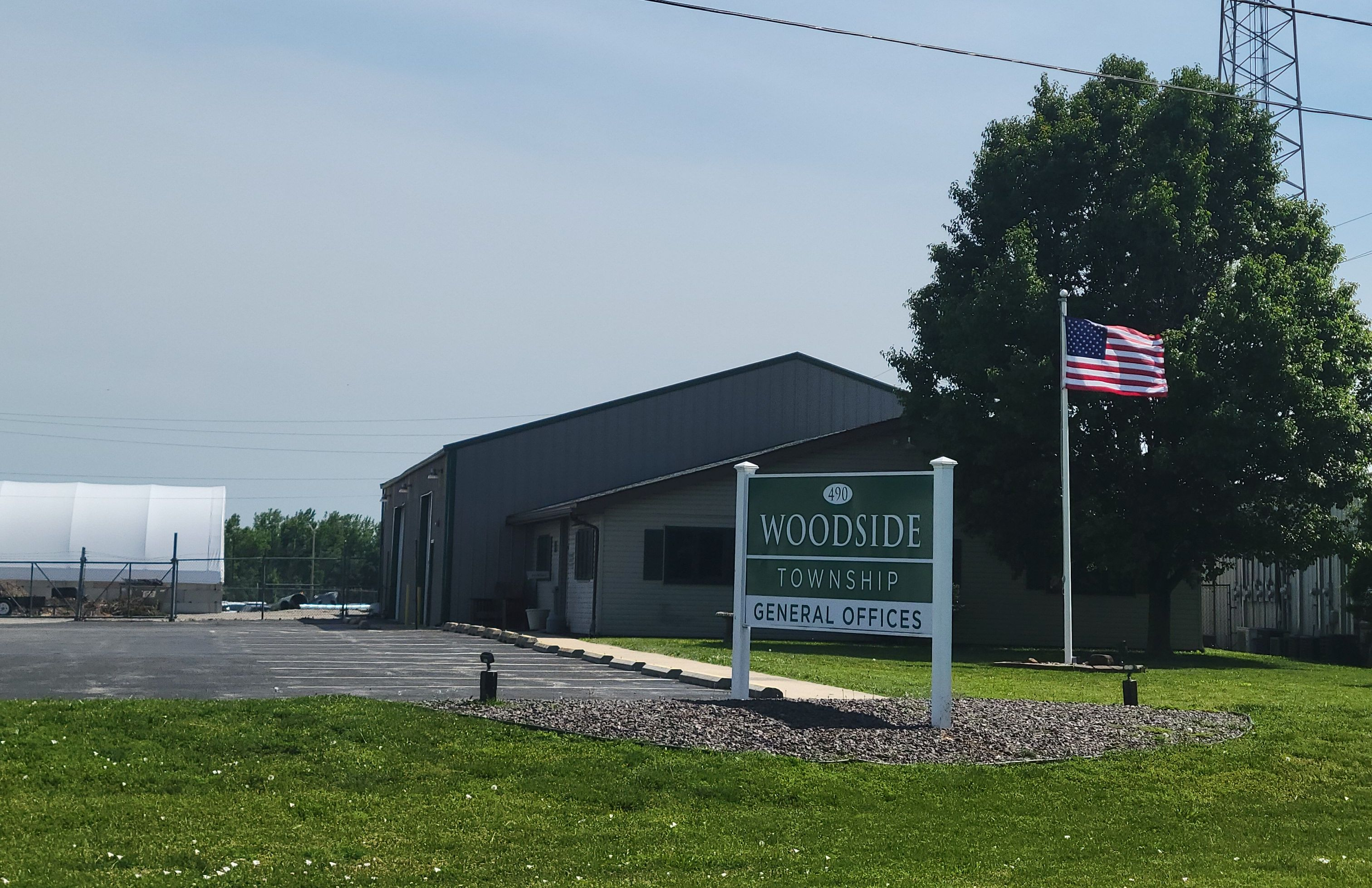
- Woodside Township government building

- Location in Sangamon County

- Sangamon County's location in Illinois
- Country: United States
- State: Illinois
- County: Sangamon
- Established: November 6, 1860

Area
  - Total: 12.65 sq mi (32.8 km^{2})
  - Land: 12.64 sq mi (32.7 km^{2})
  - Water: 0.01 sq mi (0.026 km^{2}) 0.08%

Population (2010)
  - Estimate (2016): 11,227
  - Density: 905.6/sq mi (349.7/km^{2})
- Time zone: UTC-6 (CST)
  - Summer (DST): UTC-5 (CDT)
- FIPS code: 17-167-83310

Woodside Township is located in Sangamon County, Illinois. As of the 2010 census, its population was 11,447 and it contained 5,668 housing units.

== Geography ==
According to the 2010 census, the township has a total area of 12.65 square miles (32.8 km^{2}), of which 12.64 square miles (32.7 km^{2}) (or 99.92%) is land and 0.01 square miles (0.026 km^{2}) (or 0.08%) is water.

=== Cities, Towns, Villages ===
- Jerome
- Leland Grove
- Southern View
- Springfield (small portions)

=== Unincorporated communities ===
- Cabbage Patch
- Laketown
- Toronto

== Demographics ==
Historical population
Census	Pop.	Note	%±
2016 (est.)	11,227
U.S. Decennial Census
