= Laketown, Illinois =

- Unincorporated community
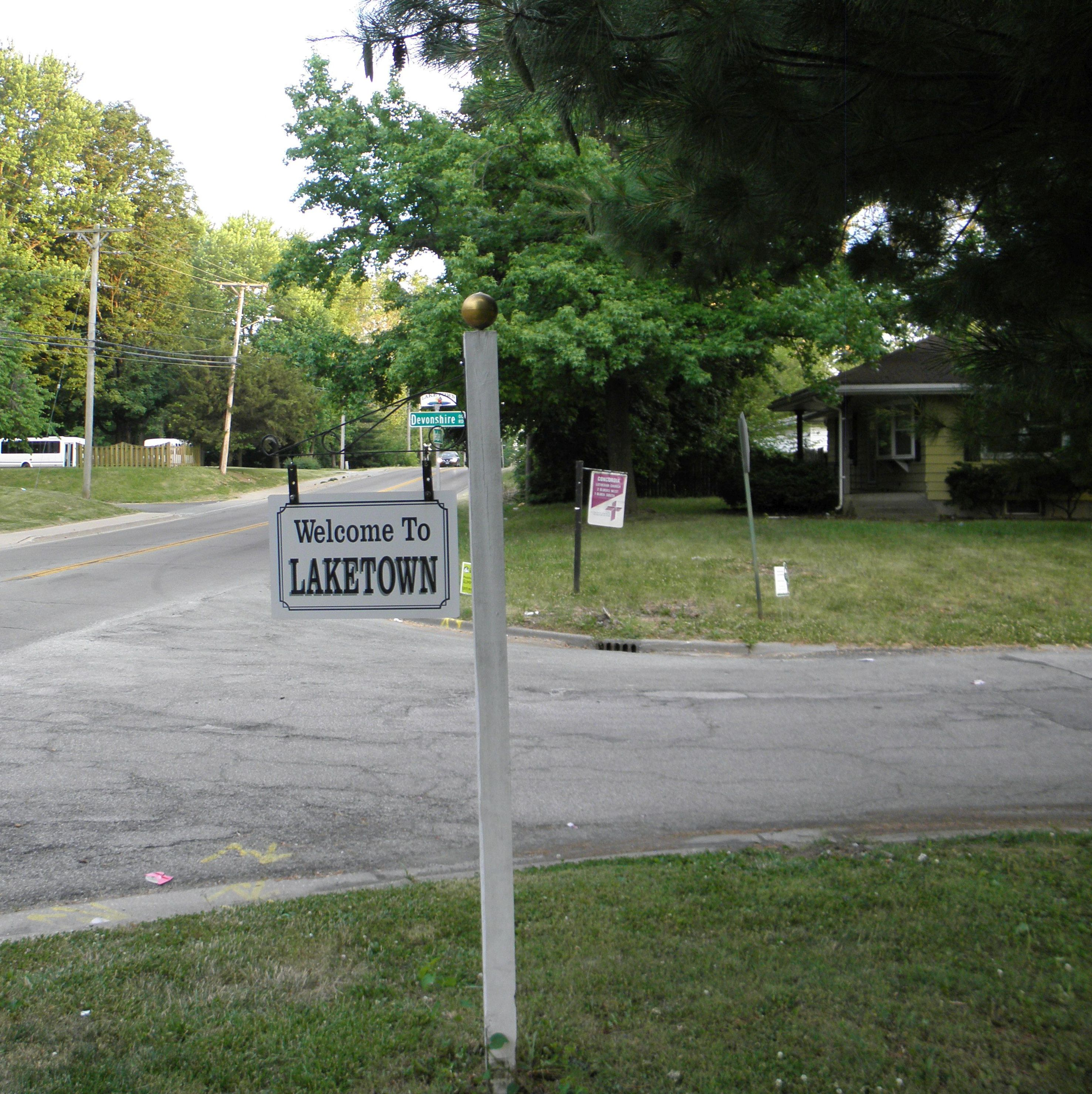
- Northeast corner of Laketown, from corner of Devonshire and West Lake Shore Drive.

- Location within Illinois Location within the United States
- Coordinates: 39°45′10″N 89°37′30″W
- Country: United States
- State: Illinois
- County: Sangamon
- Elevation: 591 ft (180 m)

Population (1986)
  - Total: 2,600
- Time zone: UTC-6 (Central (CST))
  - Summer (DST): UTC-5 (CDT)
- ZIP code: 62703
- Area code: 217

Laketown is an unincorporated community in Woodside Township, Sangamon County, Illinois, entirely surrounded by the city of Springfield. It is made up of three subdivisions: Southlawn, Lake Springfield Estates, and Circle Drive. There are approximately 970 homes in Laketown, as well as various small businesses.

Laketown takes its name from nearby Lake Springfield but does not directly adjoin the lake. The community's boundaries are defined by Stevenson Drive on the north, West Lake Shore Drive on the east, the Canadian National (formerly Illinois Central Gulf Railroad) tracks on the west, and either Circle Drive or Interstate 55 on the south.

Although outside the city limits, Laketown has long received various services from entities associated with the city, such as Springfield School District 186 and the Springfield Park District. In 2022, the District 186 board announced plans to consolidate Laketown Elementary School with two nearby elementary schools at a new location on Springfield's south side.

== History ==
The subdivisions making up Laketown were built in the late 1940s. The name "Laketown" was adopted by the Laketown Improvement Association (formerly the Southlawn Improvement Association) in 1955.

In the 1950s, the Laketown Improvement Association sponsored various community festivals and briefly operated a civic center in the neighborhood. During this period, the city of Springfield made a first unsuccessful effort to annex Laketown. In 1957, Laketown Elementary School was built on the former site of the Laketown civic center.

Laketown was annexed into Springfield on August 11, 1986 by a newly-passed state law. Known as the "hole in the doughnut" law, the statute caused unincorporated areas fully surrounded by cities with coterminous townships to be automatically annexed into those cities.

When the annexation became public in February 1987, an intense campaign led by the Laketown Association led the Springfield city council to exercise its home rule powers to reverse the annexation on March 11, 1987. The deannexation was retroactive to August 11, so that the legal effect was as if Laketown had never been annexed. Springfield was the only one of the 22 cities affected by the law to take such an action. Mayor Ossie Langfelder made a renewed attempt to annex Laketown in 1988 but this was also unsuccessful.
