= WFMB (AM) =

Coordinates: 39°45′36″N 89°39′05″W

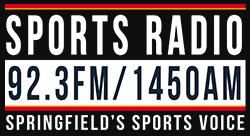
- Springfield, Illinois; United States
- Broadcast area: Springfield, Illinois metropolitan area
- Frequency: 1450 kHz
- Branding: Sports Radio 92.3FM 1450AM

Programming
- Format: Sports radio
- Affiliations: ESPN Radio; Fox Sports Radio; WICS

Ownership
- Owner: Woodward Community Media - Springfield, IL
- Sister stations: WCVS-FM, WFMB-FM, WMAY, WMAY-FM, WNNS, WQLZ

History
- First air date: August 19, 1926; 99 years ago (as WCBS, a portable radio station)
- Former call signs: WCBS (1926–1946); WCVS (1946–1992)

Technical information
- Licensing authority: FCC
- Facility ID: 48333
- Class: C
- Power: 1,000 watts unlimited
- Translator: 92.3 W222CG (Springfield)

Links
- Public license information: Public file; LMS
- Webcast: Listen Live
- Website: website

WFMB (1450 kHz) is a commercial AM radio station broadcasting a sports radio format. Licensed to Springfield, Illinois, the station is owned by Neuhoff Corp., through licensee Neuhoff Media Springfield, LLC. WFMB features local hosts in morning and afternoon drive time, plus agricultural reports weekdays at 5:30 a.m. and noon. The rest of the schedule comes from ESPN Radio.

WFMB transmits 1,000 watts non-directional. Its programming is also carried by FM translator W222CG at 92.3 MHz.

== History ==
=== WCBS ===
The station was first licensed, with the call sign WCBS, on August 19, 1926. The call letters were unrelated to the CBS Radio Network or the later WCBS in New York City.

WCBS was originally a portable broadcasting station, assigned to Harold L. Dewing and Charles H. Messter of Providence, Rhode Island. It was the second portable station licensed to Messter, joining WCBR, first licensed in 1924. Portable stations could be transported from place-to-place on movable platforms such as trucks. They were commonly hired out for a few weeks at a time to theaters located in small towns that did not have their own radio stations, to be used for special programs broadcast to the local community. Regulating "moving targets" proved difficult, so in May 1928 the Federal Radio Commission (FRC) announced it was ending the licensing of portable facilities, and WCBR was deleted in the summer of 1928.

WCBS was only briefly used as a portable station. Finding limited prospects in New England, Harold Dewing set out for the Midwest. WCBS moved to Springfield in late 1926, where it gave a debut broadcast from the Lyric Theater on December 10, and Springfield become WCBS's permanent home in 1927.

After a period when, due to an adverse court ruling, the government lost most of its authority to regulate radio stations, the Federal Radio Commission (FRC) was established, which issued temporary authorizations, starting with one on May 3, 1927, which assigned WCBS to 1230 kHz. During 1927, WCBS's frequency assignment was changed to 1430 kHz, and then to 1210 kHz. The FRC also informed stations that if they wanted to continue operating, they needed to file a formal license application by January 15, 1928, as the first step in determining whether they met the new "public interest, convenience, or necessity" standard. On May 25, 1928, the FRC issued General Order 32, which notified 164 stations, including WCBS, that "From an examination of your application for future license it does not find that public interest, convenience, or necessity would be served by granting it." However, WCBS successfully convinced the commission that it should remain licensed.

On November 11, 1928, the FRC implemented a major reallocation of station transmitting frequencies, as part of a reorganization resulting from its implementation of General Order 40. WCBS was assigned to 1210 kHz with 100 watts, sharing time on the frequency with WTAX. The frequency assigned to WCBS was changed to 1420 kHz in 1935. Its daytime power was increased to 250 watts in 1937 and its nighttime power was increased to 250 watts in 1939. Its frequency was changed to 1450 kHz in March 1941, as a result of the North American Regional Broadcasting Agreement.

=== WCVS ===
On September 8, 1946, the station call sign was changed to WCVS, so that the flagship Columbia Broadcasting System (CBS) radio station in New York City could become WCBS.

In 1958, WCVS was sold to Jerome William O'Connor's WPFA Radio Inc. for $285,000. Its daytime power was increased to 1,000 watts in 1962. In 1966, the station was sold to Eastern Broadcasting Corporation for $700,000.

WCVS aired a Top 40 format in the 1960s and 1970s. In the mid 1980s, as contemporary hit music was moving the FM band, the station switched a full service, adult contemporary format. In 1989, the station was sold to Neuhoff Broadcasting, along with 104.5 WFMB, for $4,250,000. By 1989, the station had adopted an oldies format.

=== WFMB ===
On October 1, 1992, the station's call sign was changed to WFMB, and it adopted a country music format, with programming from the Real Country network. In 1994, the station adopted a sports talk format.

In 1996, the station was sold to Patterson Broadcasting, which, after a series of acquisitions, would become part of Clear Channel Communications. In 2007, as Clear Channel was selling most of its stations in smaller markets, Neuhoff bought back the Springfield stations they had sold, including WFMB-FM.

The station still operates from an historic radio tower in suburban Springfield, IL (Southern View), which was constructed in the late 1940s, and was the original transmitter location for WICS TV 20.

== Translator ==
WFMB is also heard on 92.3 MHz, through a translator in Springfield, Illinois. The translator formerly broadcast at 107.1, with a strongly directional signal to the northeast, from about 2014 until February 2019. On February 22, 2019, the translator moved to a non-directional signal at 92.3.

Broadcast translator for WFMB
Call sign	Frequency	City of license	FID	ERP (W)	HAAT	FCC info
W222CG	92.3 FM	Springfield, Illinois	138645	250	124 m (407 ft)	LMS
