= Gardner Township, Sangamon County, Illinois =

Coordinates: 39°50′36″N 89°46′13″W

Gardner Township
- Township
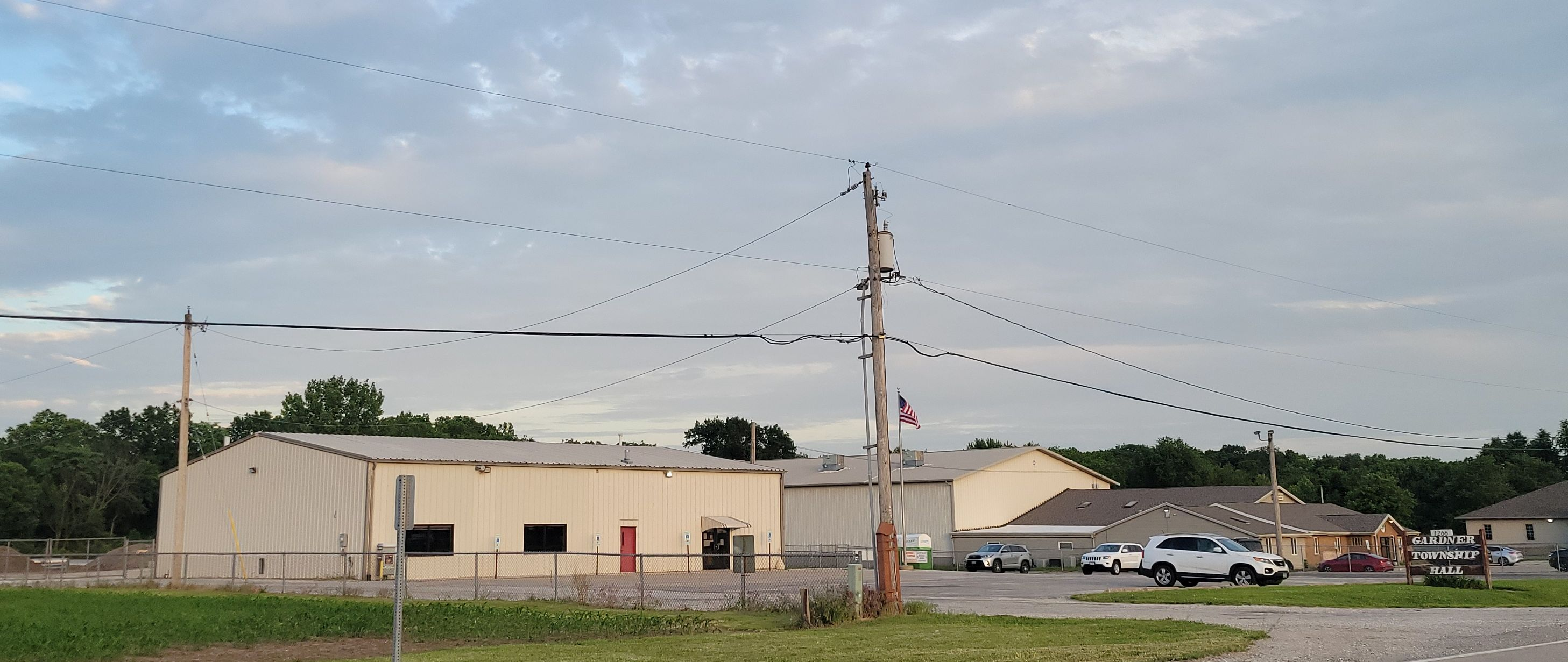
- Gardner Township Hall near Bradfordton in Sangamon County

- Location in Sangamon County

- Sangamon County's location in Illinois
- Country: United States
- State: Illinois
- County: Sangamon
- Established: November 6, 1860

Area
  - Total: 42.6 sq mi (110 km^{2})
  - Land: 42.49 sq mi (110.0 km^{2})
  - Water: 0.11 sq mi (0.28 km^{2}) 0.26%

Population (2010)
  - Estimate (2016): 4,248
  - Density: 99.9/sq mi (38.6/km^{2})
- Time zone: UTC-6 (CST)
  - Summer (DST): UTC-5 (CDT)
- FIPS code: 17-167-28651
- Website: gardnertownshipil.squarespace.com

Gardner Township is located in Sangamon County, Illinois. As of the 2010 census, its population was 4,245 and it contained 1,732 housing units. The township contains the unincorporated communities of Bradfordton and Salisbury.

The township annexed the western half of Salisbury Township in 1989, thereby taking in the unincorporated village of Salisbury and increasing in size.

== Geography ==
According to the 2010 census, the township has a total area of 42.6 square miles (110 km^{2}), of which 42.49 square miles (110.0 km^{2}) (or 99.74%) is land and 0.11 square miles (0.28 km^{2}) (or 0.26%) is water.

== Demographics ==
Historical population
Census	Pop.	Note	%±
2016 (est.)	4,248
U.S. Decennial Census
