= Toronto, Illinois =

Toronto
- Neighborhood
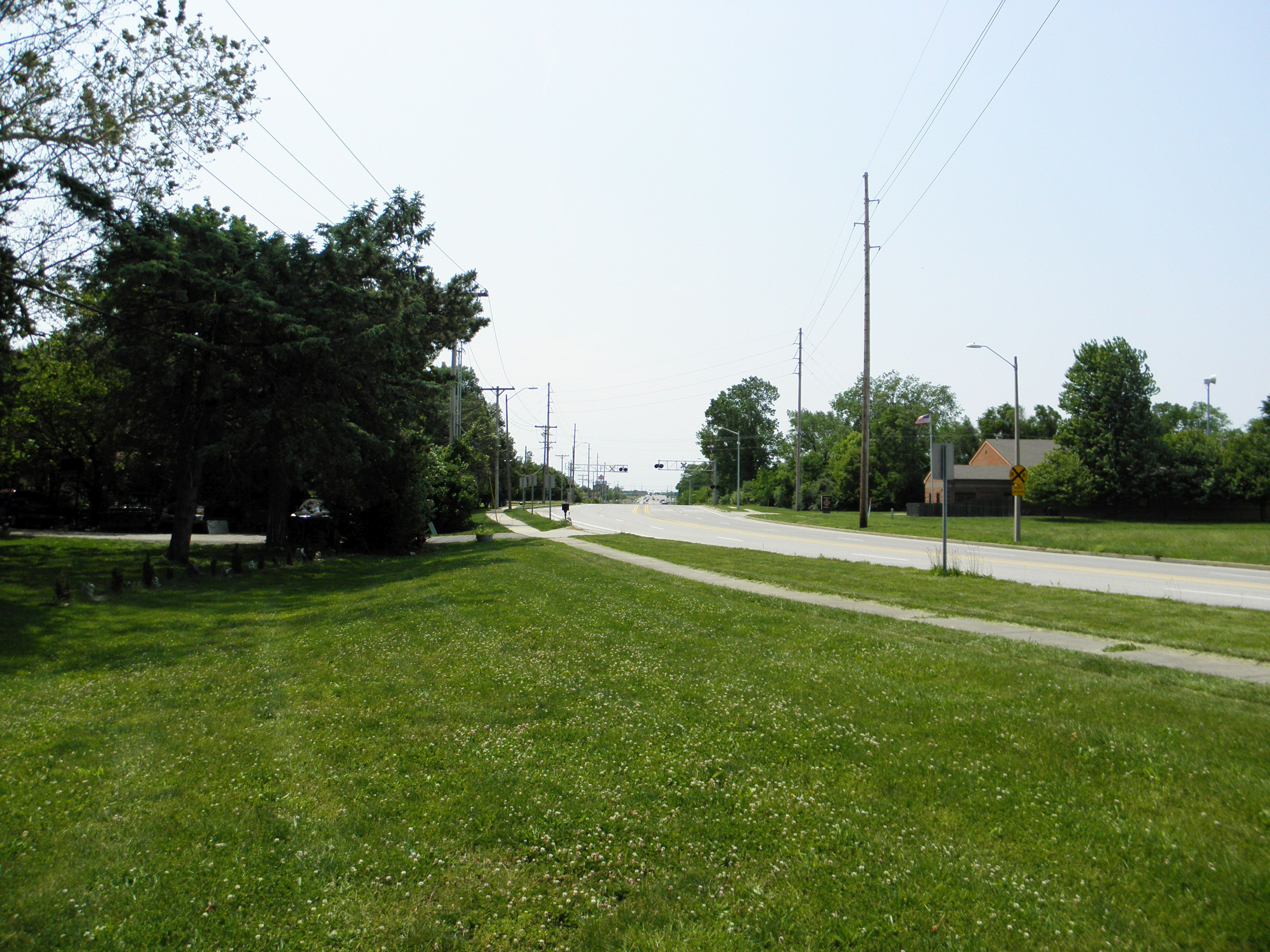
- Railroad crossing at former site of Toronto station.

- Location within Illinois Location within the United States
- Country: United States
- State: Illinois
- County: Sangamon County
- City: Springfield
- Elevation: 591 ft (180 m)
- Time zone: UTC-6 (CST)
  - Summer (DST): UTC-5 (CDT)
- ZIP code: 62712
- Area code: 217

Toronto is a neighborhood of Springfield, Illinois and a former unincorporated rural community located in Woodside Township. Originally named for a station on the Illinois Central Railroad, it is located adjacent to what is now the "Toronto Road" exit at Mile 90 of the Illinois section of Interstate 55. Today, the Toronto neighborhood of Springfield is roughly defined as the region bordering Lake Springfield south of Interstate 72 and east of Interstate 55.

== History ==
Toronto was originally built in the 1800s as a rural station stop on the Illinois Central line six miles south of Springfield, Illinois, the state capital. Farmers would bring fresh vegetables and milk to the now-vanished railroad station for transportation into nearby cities. The whistle stop may have been named after the Canadian city of Toronto.

In the late 1960s, Illinois planners built a new greenfield state university adjacent to the former Toronto. The university campus, located 1.5 miles northeast of Toronto, is now the University of Illinois at Springfield (UIS). Almost all of the land area of the former Toronto has since been annexed into Springfield, and the former rural hamlet has become an urban campustown neighborhood. The name of Toronto Road continues to commemorate the former rural hamlet and current community.

== Economy ==
Despite its formal incorporation into the boundaries of Springfield, the Toronto area maintains a distinct local economy influenced by the UIS campus, including the Capital Area Career Center and Lincoln Land Community College and parks along the lakefront.
