= Salisbury Township, Illinois =

Coordinates: 39°53′45″N 89°45′55″W

Salisbury Township
- Township
- Interactive map of Salisbury Township
- Country: United States
- State: Illinois
- County: Sangamon
- Established: March 1, 1861

Population (1980)
  - Total: 591
- Time zone: UTC-6 (CST)
  - Summer (DST): UTC-5 (CDT)

Salisbury Township was a civil township of Sangamon County, Illinois from 1861 to 1989. The population was 591 at the 1980 census.

The voters of Sangamon County approved the township form of government in the November 6, 1860 election. On March 1, 1861, the county board approved the ordinance creating the original 22 townships, one of which was Sackett Township.

The name was changed from Sackett Township to Salisbury Township on September 9, 1867.

In 1989, Salisbury Township was extinguished and its territory annexed to Fancy Creek and Gardner townships. The name of the former township survives as the name of the unincorporated community of Salisbury, Illinois within Gardner Township.

== Demographics ==
Historical population
Census	Pop.	Note	%±
1930	381		—
1940	347		−8.9%
1950	369		6.3%
1960	356		−3.5%
1970	392		10.1%
1980	591		50.8%
No populations listed past 1980. Decennial US Census
