= Berlin, Illinois =

Berlin
- Village
- Location of Berlin in Sangamon County, Illinois.
- Coordinates: 39°45′12″N 89°54′15″W
- Country: United States
- State: Illinois
- County: Sangamon

Area
  - Total: 0.89 sq mi (2.31 km^{2})
  - Land: 0.89 sq mi (2.31 km^{2})
  - Water: 0 sq mi (0.00 km^{2})
- Elevation: 640 ft (200 m)

Population (2020)
  - Total: 141
  - Density: 158.3/sq mi (61.12/km^{2})
- Time zone: UTC-6 (CST)
  - Summer (DST): UTC-5 (CDT)
- Zip code: 62670
- Area code: 217
- FIPS code: 17-05443
- GNIS feature ID: 2398103

Berlin is a village in Sangamon County, Illinois, United States. As of the 2020 census, Berlin had a population of 141. It is part of the Springfield, Illinois Metropolitan Statistical Area. It is also colloquially called "Old Berlin", due to the larger village of New Berlin 1.4 miles south.

== Geography ==
According to the 2010 census, Berlin has a total area of 1 square mile (2.59 km^{2}), all land.

== Demographics ==
Historical population
| Census | Pop. | Note | %± |
|---|---|---|---|
| 1880 | 287 | | — |
| 1890 | 260 | | −9.4% |
| 1900 | 256 | | −1.5% |
| 1910 | 251 | | −2.0% |
| 1920 | 241 | | −4.0% |
| 1930 | 222 | | −7.9% |
| 1940 | 215 | | −3.2% |
| 1950 | 218 | | 1.4% |
| 1960 | 197 | | −9.6% |
| 1970 | 175 | | −11.2% |
| 1980 | 210 | | 20.0% |
| 1990 | 180 | | −14.3% |
| 2000 | 140 | | −22.2% |
| 2010 | 180 | | 28.6% |
| 2020 | 141 | | −21.7% |
U.S. Decennial Census

As of the census of 2000, there were 140 people, 62 households, and 46 families residing in the village. The population density was 140.6 inhabitants per square mile (54.3/km^{2}). There were 69 housing units at an average density of 69.3 per square mile (26.8/km^{2}). The racial makeup of the village was 99.29% White and 0.71% African American.

There were 62 households, out of which 21.0% had children under the age of 18 living with them, 62.9% were married couples living together, 8.1% had a female householder with no husband present, and 24.2% were non-families. 19.4% of all households were made up of individuals, and 11.3% had someone living alone who was 65 years of age or older. The average household size was 2.26 and the average family size was 2.51.

In the village, the population was spread out, with 16.4% under the age of 18, 5.0% from 18 to 24, 29.3% from 25 to 44, 27.9% from 45 to 64, and 21.4% who were 65 years of age or older. The median age was 44 years. For every 100 females, there were 100.0 males. For every 100 females age 18 and over, there were 98.3 males.

The median income for a household in the village was $38,125, and the median income for a family was $41,042. Males had a median income of $29,375 versus $28,750 for females. The per capita income for the village was $15,079. There were 23.1% of families and 21.1% of the population living below the poverty line, including 24.1% of under eighteens and 30.8% of those over 64.
