= Salisbury, Illinois =

Salisbury
- Unincorporated community
- Location within Illinois Location within the United States
- Coordinates: 39°53′23″N 89°47′53″W
- Country: United States
- State: Illinois
- County: Sangamon
- Elevation: 594 ft (181 m)
- Time zone: UTC-6 (Central (CST))
  - Summer (DST): UTC-5 (CDT)
- Area code: 217
- GNIS feature ID: 417892

Salisbury is an unincorporated community located in Sangamon County, Illinois. It is located on Illinois Route 97, 11 miles (18 km) northwest of Springfield. Salisbury was once located in its own rural township, Salisbury Township. After Salisbury Township dissolved itself in 1989, the Salisbury area joined the adjacent Gardner Township, with postal addresses being assigned to the neighboring village of Pleasant Plains about seven miles to the southwest.
