= Oakford, Illinois =

- Village
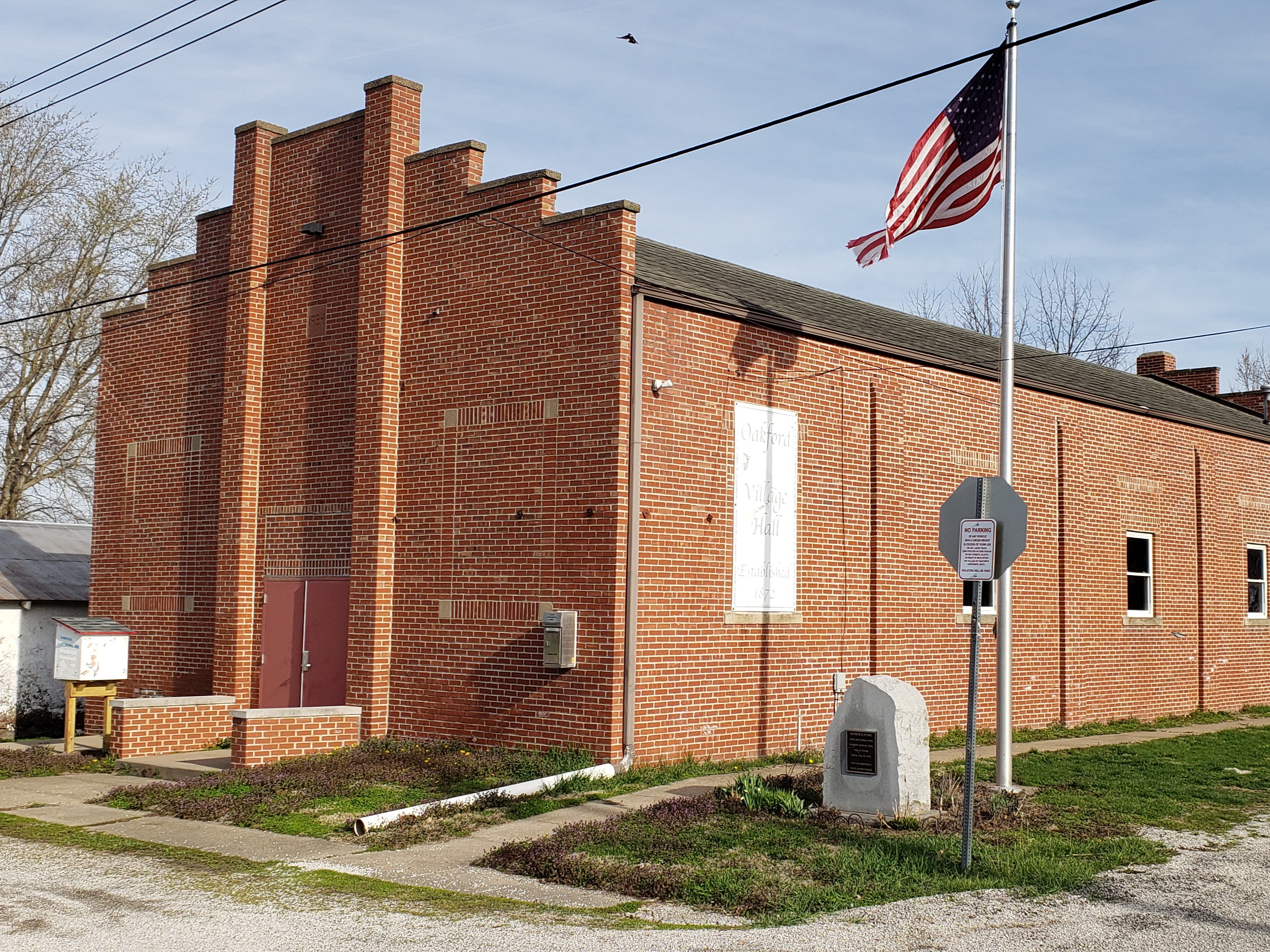
- Oakford Village Hall

- Location in Menard County, Illinois
- Coordinates: 40°06′03″N 89°57′55″W
- Country: United States
- State: Illinois
- County: Menard

Area
  - Total: 0.25 sq mi (0.64 km^{2})
  - Land: 0.25 sq mi (0.64 km^{2})
  - Water: 0 sq mi (0.00 km^{2})
- Elevation: 486 ft (148 m)

Population (2020)
  - Total: 234
  - Density: 940.3/sq mi (363.07/km^{2})
- Time zone: UTC-6 (CST)
  - Summer (DST): UTC-5 (CDT)
- ZIP code: 62673
- Area code: 217
- FIPS code: 17-54625
- GNIS feature ID: 2399542

Oakford is a village in Menard County, Illinois, United States. The population was 234 at the 2020 census, down from 286 in 2010. It is part of the Springfield, Illinois Metropolitan Statistical Area.

== Geography ==
Oakford is located in northwestern Menard County and Illinois Route 97 runs through the east side of the village, leading southeast 9 miles (14 km) to Petersburg, the county seat, and northwest 15 miles (24 km) to Havana.

According to the U.S. Census Bureau, Oakford has a total area of 0.25 square miles (0.65 km^{2}), all land. The village sits at the base of bluffs marking the southern edge of the Sangamon River valley.

== Demographics ==
Historical population
Census	Pop.	Note	%±
1900	338		—
1910	317		−6.2%
1920	351		10.7%
1930	291		−17.1%
1940	339		16.5%
1950	281		−17.1%
1960	301		7.1%
1970	272		−9.6%
1980	351		29.0%
1990	246		−29.9%
2000	309		25.6%
2010	286		−7.4%
2020	234		−18.2%
U.S. Decennial Census

As of the census of 2020, there were 234 people and 102 households residing in the village.

As of the census of 2000, there were 309 people, 131 households, and 86 families residing in the village. The population density was 1,249.3 inhabitants per square mile (482.4/km^{2}). There were 140 housing units at an average density of 566.0 per square mile (218.5/km^{2}). The racial makeup of the village was 98.38% White, 0.32% African American, 0.32% Asian, 0.32% from other races, and 0.65% from two or more races.

There were 131 households, out of which 35.1% had children under the age of 18 living with them, 48.9% were married couples living together, 13.7% had a female householder with no husband present, and 33.6% were non-families. 30.5% of all households were made up of individuals, and 16.8% had someone living alone who was 65 years of age or older. The average household size was 2.36 and the average family size was 2.92.

In the village, the population was spread out, with 27.5% under the age of 18, 7.1% from 18 to 24, 27.8% from 25 to 44, 20.7% from 45 to 64, and 16.8% who were 65 years of age or older. The median age was 37 years. For every 100 females, there were 96.8 males. For every 100 females age 18 and over, there were 96.5 males.

The median income for a household in the village was $37,857, and the median income for a family was $38,333. Males had a median income of $31,591 versus $26,125 for females. The per capita income for the village was $21,309. About 14.8% of families and 13.7% of the population were below the poverty line, including 21.2% of those under the age of eighteen and none of those 65 or over.

== Notable people ==
- Sam Dailey, pitcher for the Philadelphia Phillies
- Floyd Davis, co-winner of the 1941 Indianapolis 500, born in Oakford
