= Menard County, Illinois =

County in Illinois, United States

- County
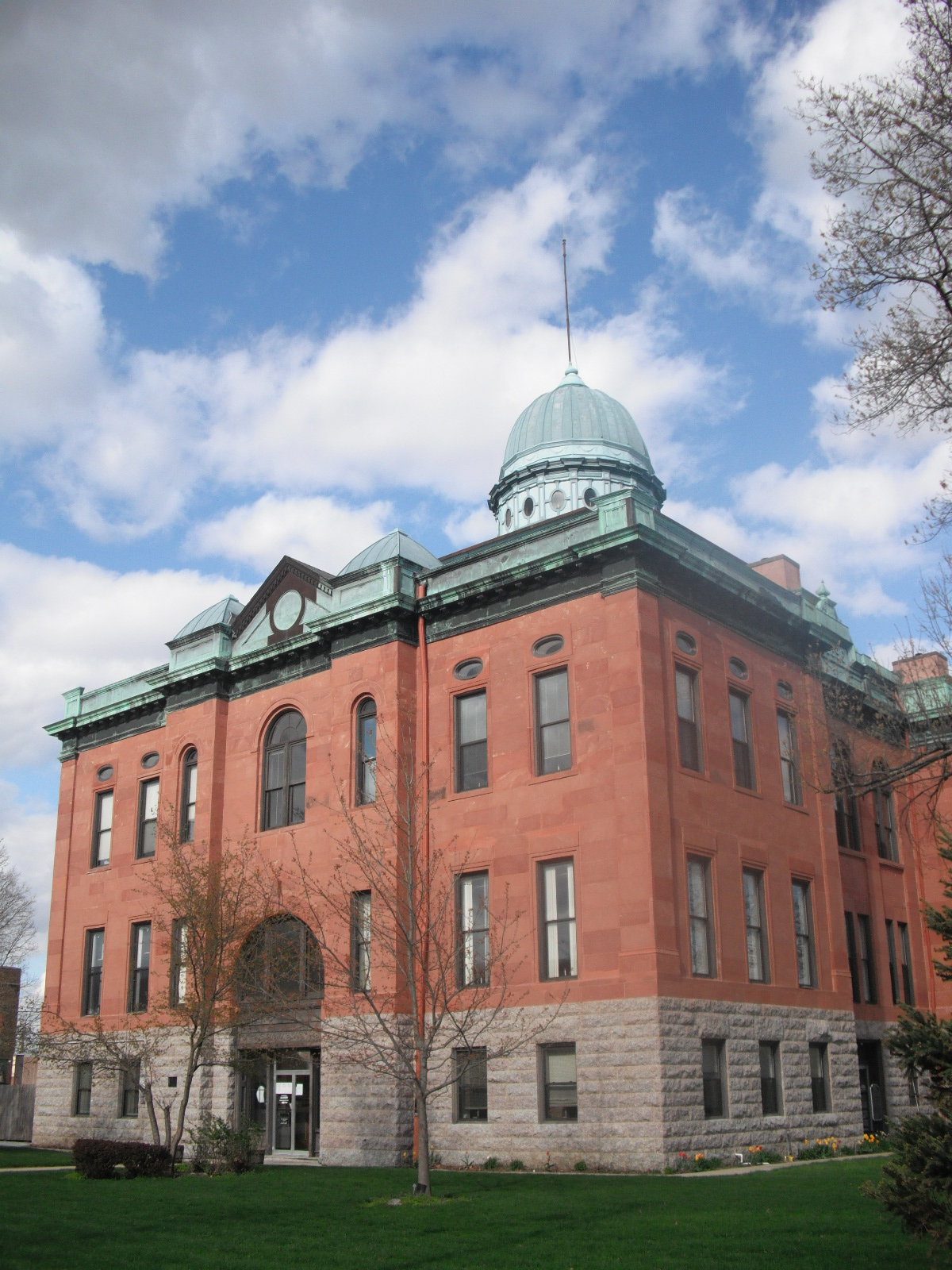
- Menard County Courthouse, Petersburg, Illinois

- Location within the U.S. state of Illinois
- Coordinates: 40°02′N 89°48′W
- Country: United States
- State: Illinois
- Founded: 1839
- Named for: Pierre Menard
- Seat: Petersburg
- Largest city: Petersburg

Area
  - Total: 315 sq mi (820 km^{2})
  - Land: 314 sq mi (810 km^{2})
  - Water: 1.0 sq mi (2.6 km^{2}) 0.3%

Population (2020)
  - Total: 12,297
  - Estimate (2025): 11,863 ▼
  - Density: 39.2/sq mi (15.1/km^{2})
- Time zone: UTC−6 (Central)
  - Summer (DST): UTC−5 (CDT)
- Congressional district: 15th
- Website: menardcountyil.gov

Menard County is a county in the U.S. state of Illinois. According to the 2020 United States census, it had a population of 12,297. Its county seat is Petersburg. Menard County is part of the Springfield, Illinois metropolitan area.

== History ==
Menard County was formed in 1839 out of Sangamon County. The County was named for Pierre Menard, the first lieutenant governor of Illinois.

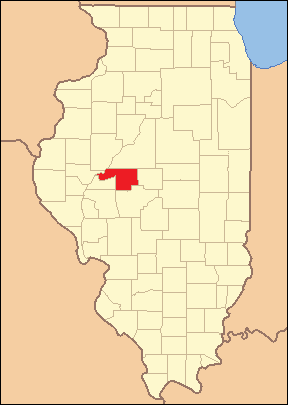
Menard County at the time of its creation in 1839

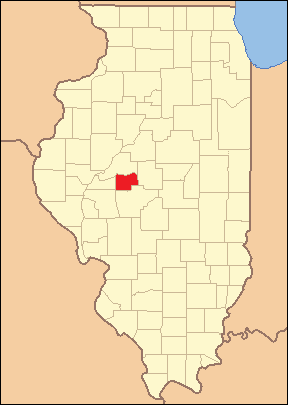
Menard County in 1841, reduced to its present borders

== Geography ==
According to the US Census Bureau, the county has an area of 315 square miles (820 km^{2}), of which 314 square miles (810 km^{2}) is land and 1.0 square mile (2.6 km^{2}) (0.3%) is water.

=== Climate and weather ===
Petersburg, Illinois

Climate chart (precipitation, max. and min. temperature)
J	F	M	A	M	J	J	A	S	O	N	D
1.6 33 17	1.8 39 22	3.2 51 32	3.4 63 42	4.1 74 53	3.8 83 62	3.5 87 66	3.4 85 64	2.8 79 55	2.6 67 44	2.9 51 34	2.5 38 23
- █ Average max. and min. temperatures in °F
- █ Precipitation totals in inches
- Source: The Weather Channel
Metric conversion
J	F	M	A	M	J	J	A	S	O	N	D
41 1 −8	46 4 −6	80 11 0	85 17 6	103 23 12	96 28 17	90 31 19	87 29 18	72 26 13	67 19 7	73 11 1	65 3 −5
- █ Average max. and min. temperatures in °C
- █ Precipitation totals in mm

In recent years, average temperatures in the county seat of Petersburg have ranged from a low of 17 °F (−8 °C) in January to a high of 87 °F (31 °C) in July, although a record low of −24 °F (−31 °C) was recorded in February 1905 and a record high of 112 °F (44 °C) was recorded in July 1954. Average monthly precipitation ranged from 1.62 inches (41 mm) in January to 4.06 inches (103 mm) in May.

=== Major highways ===
- Illinois Route 29
- Illinois Route 97
- Illinois Route 123

=== Adjacent counties ===
- Mason County - north
- Logan County - east
- Sangamon County - south
- Cass County - west

== Demographics ==
Historical population
Census	Pop.	Note	%±
1840	4,431		—
1850	6,349		43.3%
1860	9,584		51.0%
1870	11,735		22.4%
1880	13,024		11.0%
1890	13,120		0.7%
1900	14,336		9.3%
1910	12,796		−10.7%
1920	11,694		−8.6%
1930	10,575		−9.6%
1940	10,663		0.8%
1950	9,639		−9.6%
1960	9,248		−4.1%
1970	9,685		4.7%
1980	11,700		20.8%
1990	11,164		−4.6%
2000	12,486		11.8%
2010	12,705		1.8%
2020	12,297		−3.2%
2025 (est.)	11,863	▼	−3.5%
US Decennial Census; 1790-1960 1900-1990; 1990-2000 2010

=== 2020 census ===
As of the 2020 census, the county had a population of 12,297. The median age was 43.6 years. 22.7% of residents were under the age of 18 and 20.2% of residents were 65 years of age or older. For every 100 females there were 95.8 males, and for every 100 females age 18 and over there were 92.8 males age 18 and over.

The racial makeup of the county was 94.0% White, 0.7% Black or African American, 0.2% American Indian and Alaska Native, 0.4% Asian, <0.1% Native Hawaiian and Pacific Islander, 0.3% from some other race, and 4.5% from two or more races. Hispanic or Latino residents of any race comprised 1.3% of the population.

<0.1% of residents lived in urban areas, while 100.0% lived in rural areas.

There were 5,103 households in the county, of which 30.8% had children under the age of 18 living in them. Of all households, 55.2% were married-couple households, 15.3% were households with a male householder and no spouse or partner present, and 22.9% were households with a female householder and no spouse or partner present. About 25.3% of all households were made up of individuals and 12.7% had someone living alone who was 65 years of age or older.

There were 5,591 housing units, of which 8.7% were vacant. Among occupied housing units, 80.2% were owner-occupied and 19.8% were renter-occupied. The homeowner vacancy rate was 1.6% and the rental vacancy rate was 6.1%.

=== Racial and ethnic composition ===
Menard County, Illinois – Racial and ethnic composition Note: the US Census treats Hispanic/Latino as an ethnic category. This table excludes Latinos from the racial categories and assigns them to a separate category. Hispanics/Latinos may be of any race.
Race / Ethnicity (NH = Non-Hispanic)	Pop 1980	Pop 1990	Pop 2000	Pop 2010	Pop 2020	% 1980	% 1990	% 2000	% 2010	% 2020
White alone (NH)	11,627	11,075	12,240	12,320	11,502	99.38%	99.20%	98.03%	96.97%	93.54%
Black or African American alone (NH)	5	9	48	74	80	0.04%	0.08%	0.38%	0.58%	0.65%
Native American or Alaska Native alone (NH)	4	29	24	27	18	0.03%	0.26%	0.19%	0.21%	0.15%
Asian alone (NH)	11	14	21	29	49	0.09%	0.13%	0.17%	0.23%	0.40%
Native Hawaiian or Pacific Islander alone (NH)	x	x	0	1	2	x	x	0.00%	0.01%	0.02%
Other race alone (NH)	2	0	12	4	25	0.02%	0.00%	0.10%	0.03%	0.20%
Mixed race or Multiracial (NH)	x	x	47	129	461	x	x	0.38%	1.02%	3.75%
Hispanic or Latino (any race)	51	37	94	121	160	0.44%	0.33%	0.75%	0.95%	1.30%
Total	11,700	11,164	12,486	12,705	12,297	100.00%	100.00%	100.00%	100.00%	100.00%

=== 2010 census ===
As of the 2010 United States census, there were 12,705 people, 5,140 households, and 3,683 families living in the county. The population density was 40.4 inhabitants per square mile (15.6/km^{2}). There were 5,654 housing units at an average density of 18.0 per square mile (6.9/km^{2}). The racial makeup of the county was 97.5% white, 0.6% black or African American, 0.3% American Indian, 0.2% Asian, 0.4% from other races, and 1.1% from two or more races. Those of Hispanic or Latino origin made up 1.0% of the population. In terms of ancestry, 32.5% were German, 20.8% were American, 15.6% were Irish, and 14.3% were English.

Of the 5,140 households, 32.4% had children under the age of 18 living with them, 57.5% were married couples living together, 9.6% had a female householder with no husband present, 28.3% were non-families, and 24.3% of all households were made up of individuals. The average household size was 2.44 and the average family size was 2.87. The median age was 42.6 years.

The median income for a household in the county was $56,230 and the median income for a family was $65,882. Males had a median income of $42,408 versus $36,735 for females. The per capita income for the county was $26,281. About 6.1% of families and 7.7% of the population were below the poverty line, including 10.4% of those under age 18 and 9.4% of those age 65 or over.

== Communities ==
=== Cities ===
- Athens
- Petersburg (seat)

=== Villages ===
- Greenview
- Oakford
- Tallula

=== Census-designated place ===
- Lake Petersburg

=== Other unincorporated communities ===
- Atterberry
- Bobtown
- Fancy Prairie
- Hubly
- Lewisburg
- Loyd
- New Salem
- Old Salem Chautauqua
- Sweet Water
- Tice

== Politics and county government ==
Illinois counties have the option of using or rejecting the township form of providing local services. In Illinois, only 16 of the state's 102 counties have opted out of the township system; Menard County is one of the sixteen.

In the years before World War I, Menard was a German Catholic and thus Democratic county, opposed to the pietism of Yankee Protestant Northern Illinois. Theodore Roosevelt in 1904 was the only Republican to carry the county in this time span.

However, resistance against Woodrow Wilson’s participatory attitude during World War I allowed Charles Evans Hughes to carry Menard County in 1916 by a mere four votes (Hughes lost the national election). Since then, as German hostility to Wilson hardened, Menard has become a strongly Republican county. The only Democrats who have carried Menard County since 1916 have been Franklin D. Roosevelt in 1932 and 1936, and Lyndon Johnson in 1964. Apart from these three 400-electoral vote Democratic landslides, George H. W. Bush in 1992 is the sole Republican candidate since 1920 to fail to win a majority in Menard County. Jimmy Carter and Illinois-bred Barack Obama are the only Democrats since 1964 to reach forty percent of Menard County’s vote. The last two elections have seen a large swing against the Democrats.

United States presidential election results for Menard County, Illinois
Year	Republican		Democratic		Third party(ies)	
Year	No.	%	No.	%	No.	%
1892	1,278	39.03%	1,748	53.39%	248	7.57%
1896	1,642	44.28%	2,018	54.42%	48	1.29%
1900	1,632	43.25%	2,078	55.08%	63	1.67%
1904	1,705	49.46%	1,506	43.69%	236	6.85%
1908	1,600	45.56%	1,748	49.77%	164	4.67%
1912	620	19.53%	1,530	48.19%	1,025	32.28%
1916	2,693	48.45%	2,689	48.38%	176	3.17%
1920	2,882	59.19%	1,864	38.28%	123	2.53%
1924	2,931	56.18%	1,954	37.45%	332	6.36%
1928	3,243	64.54%	1,742	34.67%	40	0.80%
1932	2,327	39.96%	3,453	59.30%	43	0.74%
1936	3,067	48.86%	3,152	50.22%	58	0.92%
1940	3,531	54.68%	2,894	44.81%	33	0.51%
1944	3,013	61.17%	1,888	38.33%	25	0.51%
1948	2,899	58.35%	2,043	41.12%	26	0.52%
1952	3,307	62.92%	1,946	37.02%	3	0.06%
1956	3,188	63.44%	1,833	36.48%	4	0.08%
1960	3,120	60.08%	2,068	39.82%	5	0.10%
1964	2,322	48.24%	2,491	51.76%	0	0.00%
1968	2,980	59.66%	1,640	32.83%	375	7.51%
1972	3,657	69.49%	1,587	30.15%	19	0.36%
1976	3,137	57.25%	2,301	42.00%	41	0.75%
1980	3,622	65.45%	1,589	28.71%	323	5.84%
1984	3,925	68.07%	1,826	31.67%	15	0.26%
1988	3,560	62.40%	2,103	36.86%	42	0.74%
1992	2,834	44.99%	2,264	35.94%	1,201	19.07%
1996	3,106	52.93%	2,204	37.56%	558	9.51%
2000	3,862	62.27%	2,164	34.89%	176	2.84%
2004	4,408	67.05%	2,137	32.51%	29	0.44%
2008	3,672	56.69%	2,706	41.78%	99	1.53%
2012	3,948	64.18%	2,100	34.14%	103	1.67%
2016	4,231	64.94%	1,817	27.89%	467	7.17%
2020	4,764	68.51%	2,022	29.08%	168	2.42%
2024	4,601	69.82%	1,864	28.29%	125	1.90%

== Education ==
K-12 School districts include:

- A-C Central Community Unit School District 262
- Athens Community Unit School District 213
- Greenview Community Unit School District 200
- Mount Pulaski Community Unit District 23
- Porta Community Unit School District 202
- Pleasant Plains Community Unit School District 8
- Williamsville Community Unit School District 15

There is also an elementary school district, New Holland-Middletown Elementary School District 88, and a secondary school district, Lincoln Community High School District 404.

== See also ==
- National Register of Historic Places listings in Menard County IL
