= Williamsville, Illinois =

Williamsville
- Village
- Location of Williamsville in Sangamon County, Illinois.
- Coordinates: 39°57′16″N 89°32′49″W
- Country: United States
- State: Illinois
- County: Sangamon

Area
  - Total: 1.58 sq mi (4.08 km^{2})
  - Land: 1.55 sq mi (4.01 km^{2})
  - Water: 0.027 sq mi (0.07 km^{2})
- Elevation: 604 ft (184 m)

Population (2020)
  - Total: 1,425
  - Density: 920.2/sq mi (355.31/km^{2})
- Time zone: UTC-6 (CST)
  - Summer (DST): UTC-5 (CDT)
- ZIP code: 62693
- Area code: 217
- FIPS code: 17-81854
- GNIS feature ID: 2399698
- Website: williamsville.illinois.gov

Williamsville is a village in Sangamon County, Illinois, United States. As of the 2020 census, Williamsville had a population of 1,425. It is part of the Springfield, Illinois Metropolitan Statistical Area. The village is named after Springfield merchant and banker John Williams.

== Geography ==
According to the 2010 census, Williamsville has a total area of 1.26 square miles (3.26 km^{2}), all land.

== Demographics ==
Historical population
Census	Pop.	Note	%±
1880	457		—
1890	444		−2.8%
1900	573		29.1%
1910	600		4.7%
1920	652		8.7%
1930	661		1.4%
1940	649		−1.8%
1950	656		1.1%
1960	735		12.0%
1970	923		25.6%
1980	996		7.9%
1990	1,140		14.5%
2000	1,439		26.2%
2010	1,476		2.6%
2020	1,425		−3.5%
U.S. Decennial Census

=== 2020 census ===
As of the 2020 census, Williamsville had a population of 1,425. The median age was 42.7 years. 25.1% of residents were under the age of 18 and 16.0% of residents were 65 years of age or older. For every 100 females there were 91.8 males, and for every 100 females age 18 and over there were 86.1 males age 18 and over.

100.0% of residents lived in urban areas, while 0.0% lived in rural areas.

There were 562 households in Williamsville, of which 34.5% had children under the age of 18 living in them. Of all households, 60.9% were married-couple households, 9.3% were households with a male householder and no spouse or partner present, and 25.3% were households with a female householder and no spouse or partner present. About 23.5% of all households were made up of individuals and 11.2% had someone living alone who was 65 years of age or older.

There were 592 housing units, of which 5.1% were vacant. The homeowner vacancy rate was 1.9% and the rental vacancy rate was 13.3%.

Racial composition as of the 2020 census
Race	Number	Percent
White	1,341	94.1%
Black or African American	2	0.1%
American Indian and Alaska Native	7	0.5%
Asian	2	0.1%
Native Hawaiian and Other Pacific Islander	0	0.0%
Some other race	3	0.2%
Two or more races	70	4.9%
Hispanic or Latino (of any race)	24	1.7%

=== 2000 census ===
As of the census of 2000, there were 1,439 people, 531 households, and 417 families residing in the village. The population density was 1,159.0 inhabitants per square mile (447.5/km^{2}). There were 555 housing units at an average density of 447.0 per square mile (172.6/km^{2}). The racial makeup of the village was 98.12% White, 0.56% African American, 0.49% Native American, 0.14% Asian, 0.28% from other races, and 0.42% from two or more races. Hispanic or Latino of any race were 0.83% of the population.

There were 531 households, out of which 42.4% had children under the age of 18 living with them, 69.5% were married couples living together, 7.2% had a female householder with no husband present, and 21.3% were non-families. 19.4% of all households were made up of individuals, and 9.0% had someone living alone who was 65 years of age or older. The average household size was 2.71 and the average family size was 3.12.

In the village, the population was spread out, with 29.3% under the age of 18, 7.2% from 18 to 24, 31.1% from 25 to 44, 19.0% from 45 to 64, and 13.5% who were 65 years of age or older. The median age was 36 years. For every 100 females, there were 89.8 males. For every 100 females age 18 and over, there were 89.9 males.

The median income for a household in the village was $50,238, and the median income for a family was $56,012. Males had a median income of $41,169 versus $30,870 for females. The per capita income for the village was $20,201. About 1.8% of families and 3.1% of the population were below the poverty line, including 2.0% of those under age 18 and 4.3% of those age 65 or over.

== Education ==
The Williamsville-Sherman CUSD15 office is located at 800 S. Walnut St., Williamsville, IL 62693
