= Fancy Creek Township, Sangamon County, Illinois =

Coordinates: 39°55′06″N 89°39′35″W

Fancy Creek Township
- Township
- Location in Sangamon County

- Sangamon County's location in Illinois
- Country: United States
- State: Illinois
- County: Sangamon
- Established: November 6, 1860

Area
  - Total: 47.07 sq mi (121.9 km^{2})
  - Land: 46.97 sq mi (121.7 km^{2})
  - Water: 0.1 sq mi (0.26 km^{2}) 0.21%

Population (2010)
  - Estimate (2016): 5,828
  - Density: 115.2/sq mi (44.5/km^{2})
- Time zone: UTC-6 (CST)
  - Summer (DST): UTC-5 (CDT)
- FIPS code: 17-167-25323

Fancy Creek Township is located in Sangamon County, Illinois. As of the 2010 census, its population was 5,410 and it contained 2,074 housing units. Fancy Creek Township changed its name from Power Township on September 11, 1861. The township annexed the eastern half of Salisbury Township in 1989, thereby increasing in size.

The Sangamon River State Fish and Wildlife Area, a state-owned conservation area, is located here on the banks of the Sangamon River.

== Geography ==
According to the 2010 census, the township has a total area of 47.07 square miles (121.9 km^{2}), of which 46.97 square miles (121.7 km^{2}) (or 99.79%) is land and 0.1 square miles (0.26 km^{2}) (or 0.21%) is water.

== Demographics ==
Historical population
Census	Pop.	Note	%±
2016 (est.)	5,828
U.S. Decennial Census
