= Curran, Illinois =

Curran
- Village
- Location of Curran in Sangamon County, Illinois.
- Coordinates: 39°44′52″N 89°46′21″W
- Country: United States
- State: Illinois
- County: Sangamon
- Township: Curran

Area
  - Total: 1.97 sq mi (5.11 km^{2})
  - Land: 1.97 sq mi (5.11 km^{2})
  - Water: 0 sq mi (0.00 km^{2})
- Elevation: 617 ft (188 m)

Population (2020)
  - Total: 213
  - Density: 107.9/sq mi (41.65/km^{2})
- Time zone: UTC-6 (CST)
  - Summer (DST): UTC-5 (CDT)
- ZIP code: 62670
- FIPS code: 17-18147
- GNIS feature ID: 2398660
- Website: curranil.govoffice2.com

Curran is a village in Curran Township, Sangamon County, Illinois, United States. It was incorporated in 2005. As of the 2020 census, Curran had a population of 213.

Curran is located a few miles west of Springfield and is part of the Springfield Metropolitan Statistical Area.

== Geography ==
According to the 2010 census, Curran has a total area of 2.07 square miles (5.36 km^{2}), all land.

== Government ==
Curran is governed by a typical village administration consisting of a Village President and six Trustees. The first village-wide election took place in April 2007. Brian Markley is the current Village President.

The Village Clerk and Treasurer are appointed.

== Demographics ==
Historical population
| Census | Pop. | Note | %± |
|---|---|---|---|
| 2010 | 212 | | — |
| 2020 | 213 | | 0.5% |
U.S. Decennial Census
