= Southern View, Illinois =

- Village
- Village of Southern View
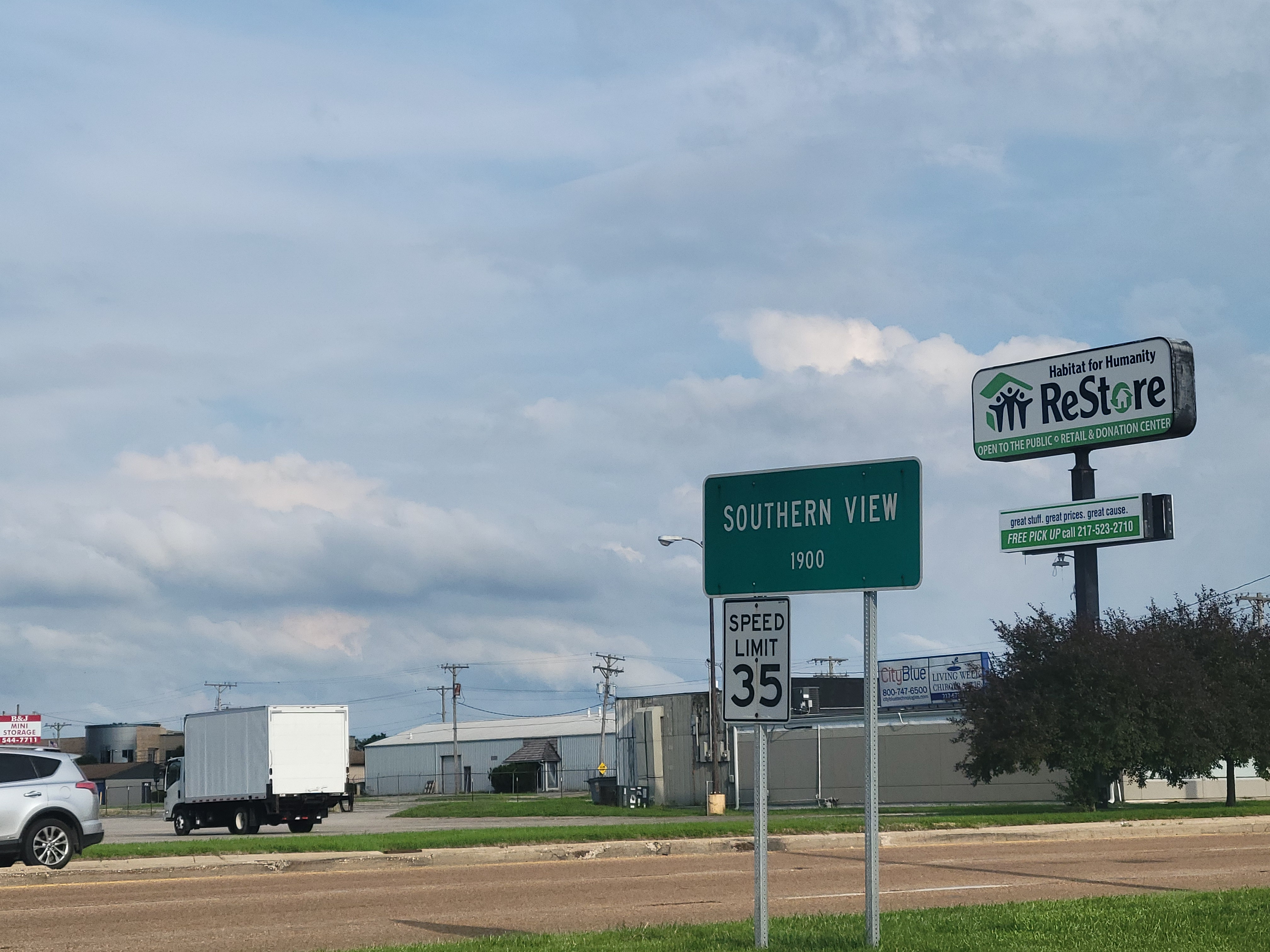
- Northern approach to Southern View

- Location of Southern View in Sangamon County, Illinois.
- Coordinates: 39°45′05″N 89°39′04″W
- Country: United States
- State: Illinois
- County: Sangamon
- Township: Woodside

Area
  - Total: 0.67 sq mi (1.73 km^{2})
  - Land: 0.67 sq mi (1.73 km^{2})
  - Water: 0.0039 sq mi (0.01 km^{2})
- Elevation: 610 ft (190 m)

Population (2020)
  - Total: 1,596
  - Density: 2,394.3/sq mi (924.45/km^{2})
- Time zone: UTC-6 (CST)
  - Summer (DST): UTC-5 (CDT)
- ZIP code: 62703
- Area code: 217
- FIPS code: 17-70759
- GNIS feature ID: 2399864
- Website: www.southernview.us

Southern View is a village in Sangamon County, Illinois, United States. As of the 2020 census, Southern View had a population of 1,596. It is part of the Springfield, Illinois Metropolitan Statistical Area.

== Geography ==
According to the 2010 census, Southern View has a total area of 0.51 square miles (1.32 km^{2}), all land.

== Demographics ==
Historical population
| Census | Pop. | Note | %± |
|---|---|---|---|
| 1940 | 433 | | — |
| 1950 | 898 | | 107.4% |
| 1960 | 1,485 | | 65.4% |
| 1970 | 1,504 | | 1.3% |
| 1980 | 1,306 | | −13.2% |
| 1990 | 1,906 | | 45.9% |
| 2000 | 1,695 | | −11.1% |
| 2010 | 1,642 | | −3.1% |
| 2020 | 1,596 | | −2.8% |
U.S. Decennial Census

=== 2020 census ===
As of the 2020 census, Southern View had a population of 1,596. The median age was 44.7 years. 15.8% of residents were under the age of 18 and 19.6% of residents were 65 years of age or older. For every 100 females there were 86.9 males, and for every 100 females age 18 and over there were 82.1 males age 18 and over.

100.0% of residents lived in urban areas, while 0.0% lived in rural areas.

There were 759 households in Southern View, of which 20.2% had children under the age of 18 living in them. Of all households, 29.6% were married-couple households, 23.3% were households with a male householder and no spouse or partner present, and 38.2% were households with a female householder and no spouse or partner present. About 39.4% of all households were made up of individuals and 16.1% had someone living alone who was 65 years of age or older.

There were 819 housing units, of which 7.3% were vacant. The homeowner vacancy rate was 2.2% and the rental vacancy rate was 5.2%.

Racial composition as of the 2020 census
| Race | Number | Percent |
|---|---|---|
| White | 1,327 | 83.1% |
| Black or African American | 97 | 6.1% |
| American Indian and Alaska Native | 4 | 0.3% |
| Asian | 12 | 0.8% |
| Native Hawaiian and Other Pacific Islander | 1 | 0.1% |
| Some other race | 30 | 1.9% |
| Two or more races | 125 | 7.8% |
| Hispanic or Latino (of any race) | 48 | 3.0% |

=== 2000 census ===
As of the census of 2000, there were 1,695 people, 798 households, and 453 families residing in the village. The population density was 3,218.4 inhabitants per square mile (1,242.6/km^{2}). There were 841 housing units at an average density of 1,596.8 per square mile (616.5/km^{2}). The racial makeup of the village was 96.34% White, 0.83% African American, 0.53% Native American, 0.83% Asian, 1.06% from other races, and 0.41% from two or more races. Hispanic or Latino of any race were 1.71% of the population.

There were 798 households, out of which 24.6% had children under the age of 18 living with them, 43.9% were married couples living together, 10.9% had a female householder with no husband present, and 43.2% were non-families. 36.2% of all households were made up of individuals, and 15.4% had someone living alone who was 65 years of age or older. The average household size was 2.12 and the average family size was 2.79.

In the village, the population was spread out, with 19.8% under the age of 18, 6.8% from 18 to 24, 31.7% from 25 to 44, 21.8% from 45 to 64, and 19.9% who were 65 years of age or older. The median age was 40 years. For every 100 females, there were 85.7 males. For every 100 females age 18 and over, there were 81.7 males.

The median income for a household in the village was $37,964, and the median income for a family was $47,386. Males had a median income of $32,284 versus $27,188 for females. The per capita income for the village was $18,633. About 4.7% of families and 7.6% of the population were below the poverty line, including 7.1% of those under age 18 and 4.4% of those age 65 or over.

== Transportation ==
SMTD provides bus service on Routes 12, 14, and 202 connecting Southern View to downtown Springfield and other destinations.
