= Thomas Rees Memorial Carillon =

Bell instrument in Springfield, Illinois, US

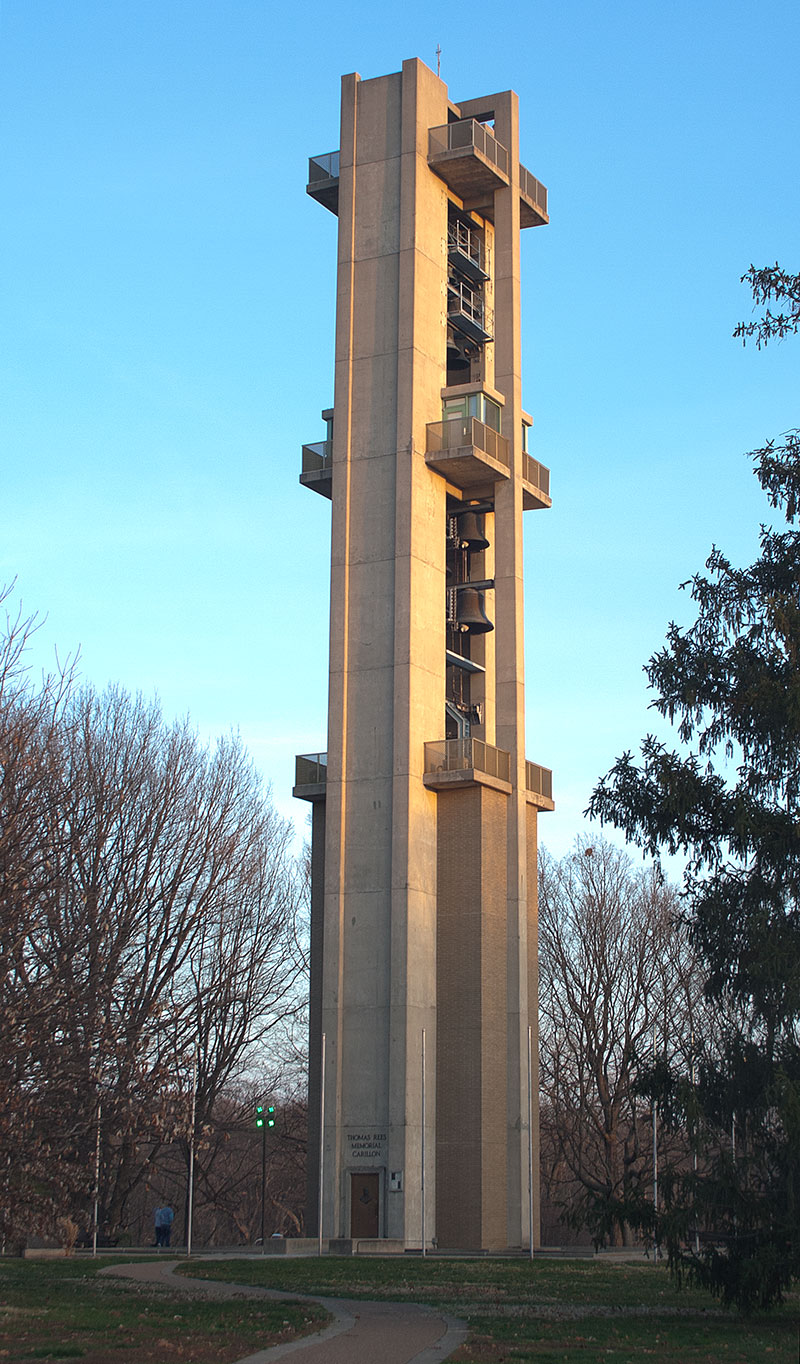
- Interactive map of the Thomas Rees Memorial Carillon area

General information
- Type: Carillon
- Architectural style: Brutalism
- Location: Washington Park, 1740 W Fayette Ave, Springfield, Illinois 62704; United States
- Coordinates: 39°47′22″N 89°41′00″W
- Inaugurated: June 1962
- Renovated: 1978, 1987, 1993, 2000, 2008
- Cost: $200,000
- Renovation cost: $90,000 (2008)
- Owner: Springfield Park District

Height
- Architectural: 132 feet (40 m)
- Observatory: 48 feet (15 m); 84 feet (26 m); 120 feet (37 m)

Technical details
- Floor count: 3
- Lifts/elevators: 1

Design and construction
- Architect: Bill Turley
- Other designers: Petit & Fritsen (bell casting)

Other information
- Public transit: SMTD

Website
- www.carillon-rees.org

The Thomas Rees Memorial Carillon is a carillon located in Washington Park in Springfield, Illinois. The brutalist tower stands 132 feet and is constructed from concrete, brick and steel. It was dedicated in 1962 and designed by Bill Turley. Each year the carillon hosts the International Carillon Festival which features world-renowned carillonneurs.

== History ==
The Thomas Rees Memorial Carillon is the gift of Thomas Rees, a one-term Illinois senator elected in 1902, who also published the Illinois State Register from 1881 until his death in 1933. During World War I, Rees served on the International Board of Arbitration for newspapers and later for unions, which gave him the opportunity to travel throughout Europe. Rees attributed his great interest in bells to visiting carillons in Belgium and the Netherlands. His initial interest is claimed to be the result of articles he had read in National Geographic, among other publications.

Rees provided $200,000 from a trust fund to build the carillon and left very specific instructions in his will regarding the number of bells and the location of the carillon. The project was carried out by the Springfield Park District. The bells were cast by the Dutch bell foundry Petit & Fritsen and the tower to house them was constructed in Washington Park. The campanile was dedicated in June 1962.

The carillon has been periodically closed and renovated throughout its lifetime. The system of transmission cables was overhauled twice: once in 1978 and again in 1987. The Rees Carillon was closed for a period in 1993 while it underwent a major structural renovation. In 2008 the Rees Carillon underwent renovation that replaced seven of the bells' clappers at a cost of $90,000.

== Design ==
=== Carillon ===
The carillon features 67 bells that have a total weight of 82,753 pounds (37,536 kg). The bronze bells vary in size with the largest bell, the G-flat, weighing 7.5 short tons (6.8 t) and the smallest bell weighing 22 pounds (10.0 kg). The carillon originally featured 66 bells but a 67th bell, B-flat, was added in February 2000. The bells were cast by Petit & Fritsen in Aarle-Rixtel from the Netherlands.

The Rees Memorial Carillon is claimed to be one of the world's largest; the Springfield, Illinois Convention & Visitor's Bureau claims it is the 3rd largest, while the local public television affiliate simply asserted it as "one of the world's largest" in 1997. Additionally, author Don Davenport stated it was the world's 5th largest carillon in 2002. The Rees Carillon was also featured in a slideshow on Midwest Living's website where it was called "one of the world's largest carillons".

=== Tower ===
The carillon is housed in a free-standing campanile 132 feet (40 m) tall. It was designed by architect Bill Turley, who had several other Springfield commissions including the Hoogland Center for the Arts (standing as of 2022) and the former Springfield YMCA (demolished, 2021). Constructed out of concrete, brick, and steel, the tower is an excellent example of the brutalist architectural style. It features three observation decks within an open interior. The bells are hung dead across the height of the tower. They hang as low as 52 feet (16 m) and as high as 105 feet (32 m). The tower stands in the park surrounded by gardens and a reflecting pool.

== Festival and tours ==
The Rees Memorial Carillon hosts a week-long international carillon festival each summer, typically held during the week that concludes with the first full weekend in June. The International Carillon Festival is typically held in June and features concerts during the evenings of festival week. World class carillonneurs come to the United States to play the International Carillon Festival. The 2011 festival was held from June 5–12 and was the festival's 50th anniversary. Though the carillon was dedicated in 1962, the first International Carillon Festival at Washington Park was in 1961. In the 2007 edition Chase's Calendar of Events called the Rees Memorial Carillon's International Carillon Festival "the world's best known carillon festival." Tours of the carillon are available during the spring and summer; The Springfield Park District's website includes tour and concerts times. Winter tours are available by appointment only. Entrance to the Thomas Rees Memorial Carillon requires paying a nominal fee. Visitors to the carillon can travel to the top by elevator where a scenic view of Springfield awaits.

== See also ==
- List of carillons in the United States
