= Southwind Park =

Park in Springfield, Illinois, United States

Coordinates: 39.732°N 89.656°W

The Edwin Watts Southwind Park, popularly known as Southwind Park, is an 80-acre (0.3 km^{2}) park within the Springfield Park District in Springfield, Illinois. It describes itself as a national model park for the demonstration of compliance with the Americans with Disabilities Act (ADA) in the provision of accessibilities to persons with disabilities.

== Park features ==
The park features 2.5 miles of paved, wheelchair-accessible urban trails. The winding trails provide access to a series of fully accessible park amenities, including a ramped tree house, two ADA-compliant playgrounds, and three fishing piers. The music podium, Selvaggio Arches, features an automated nightly sound-and-light show. The park's banquet hall, Erin's Pavilion, is accessible to rent for special events.

The nearest limited-highway access is Exit 90 on Interstate 55.
