= Springfield, Illinois =

Capital city of Illinois, United States

Springfield
- State capital
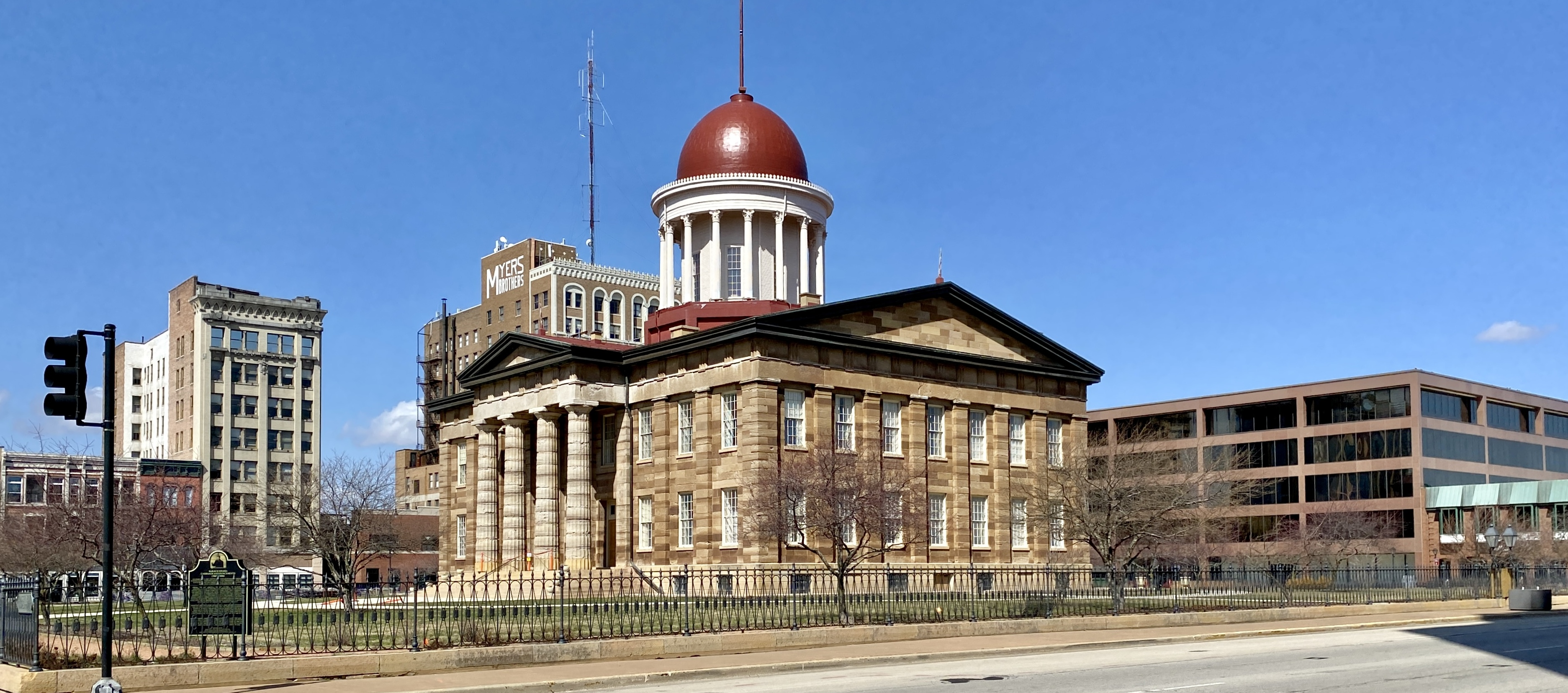
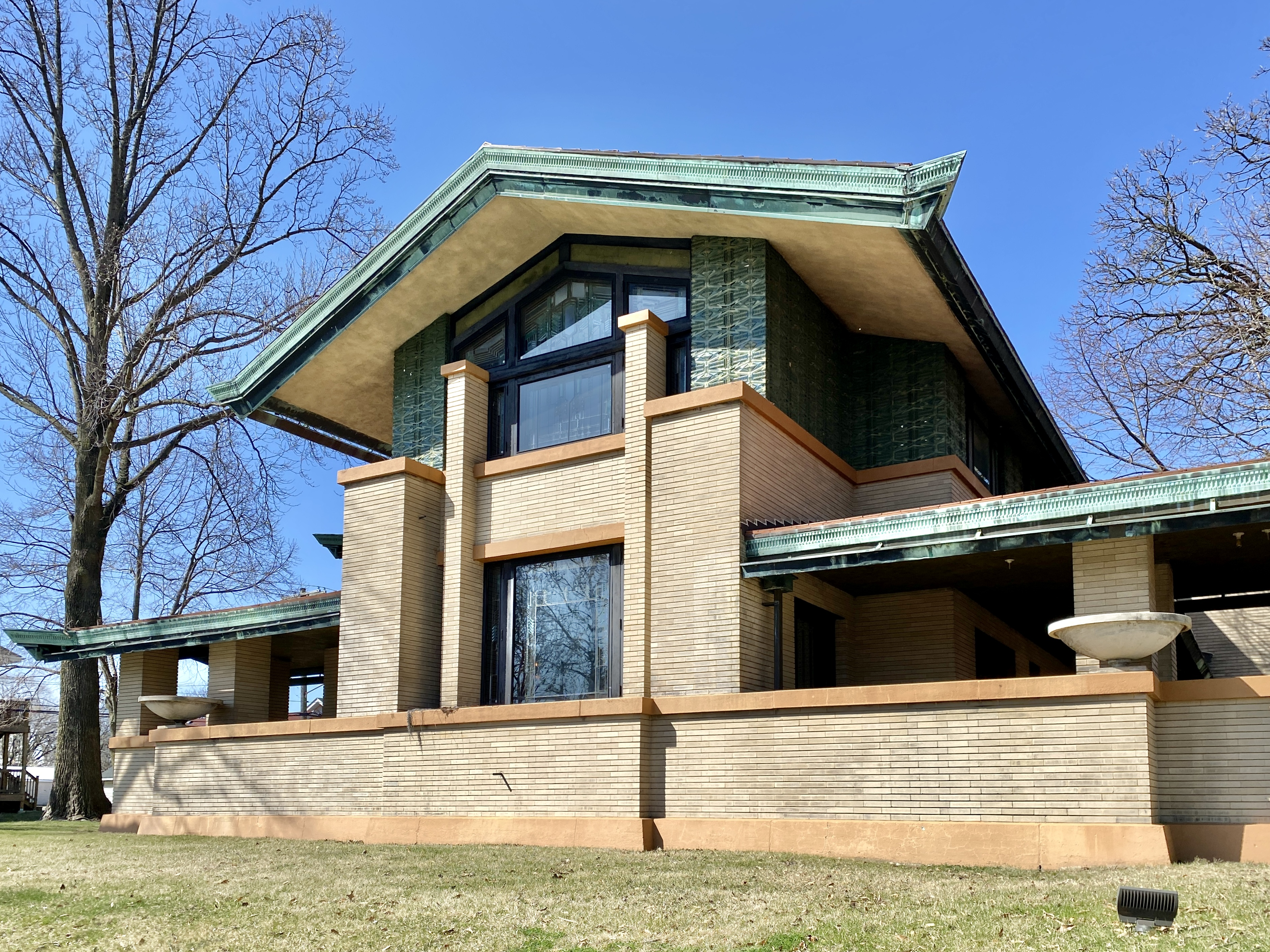
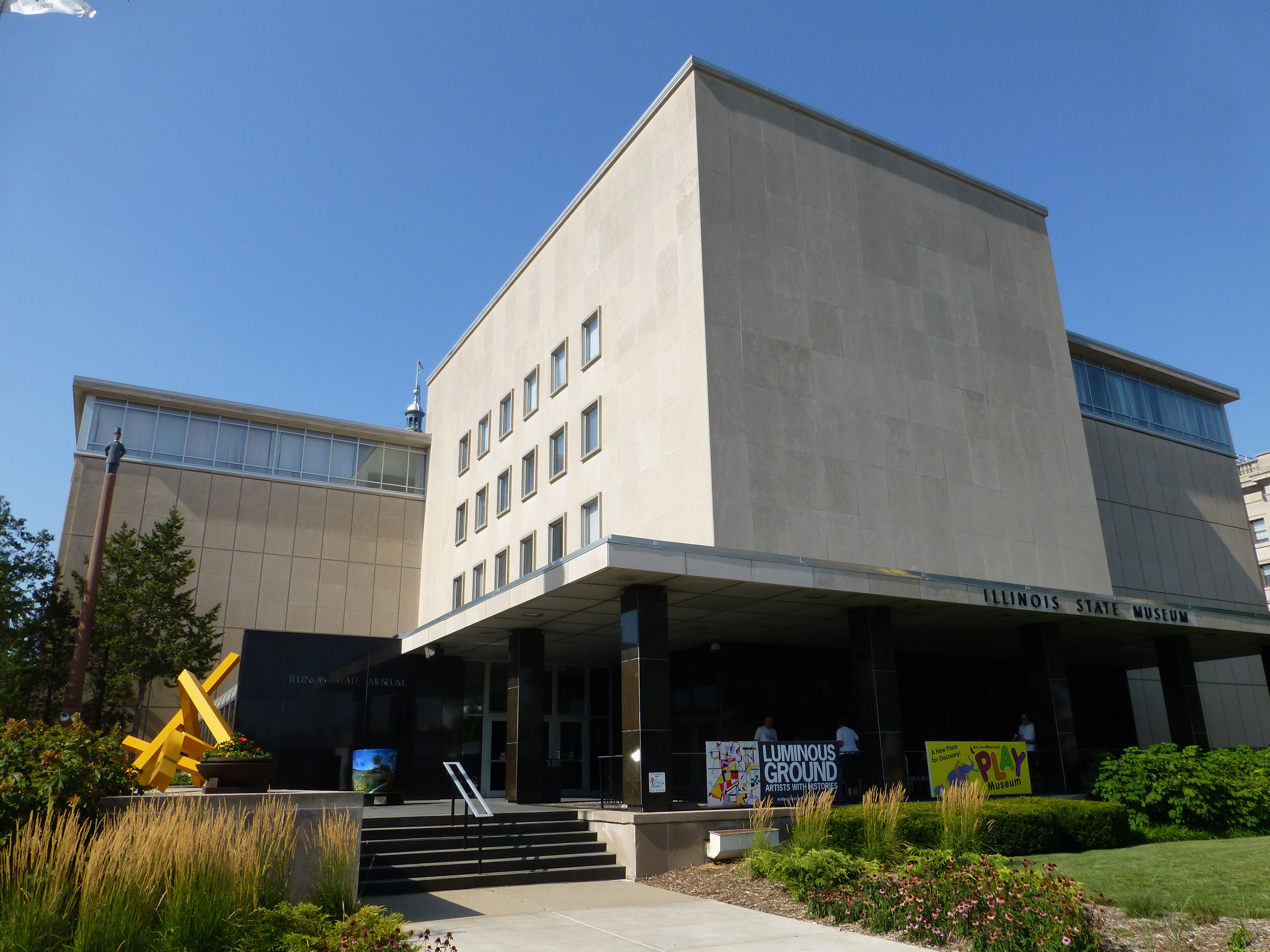
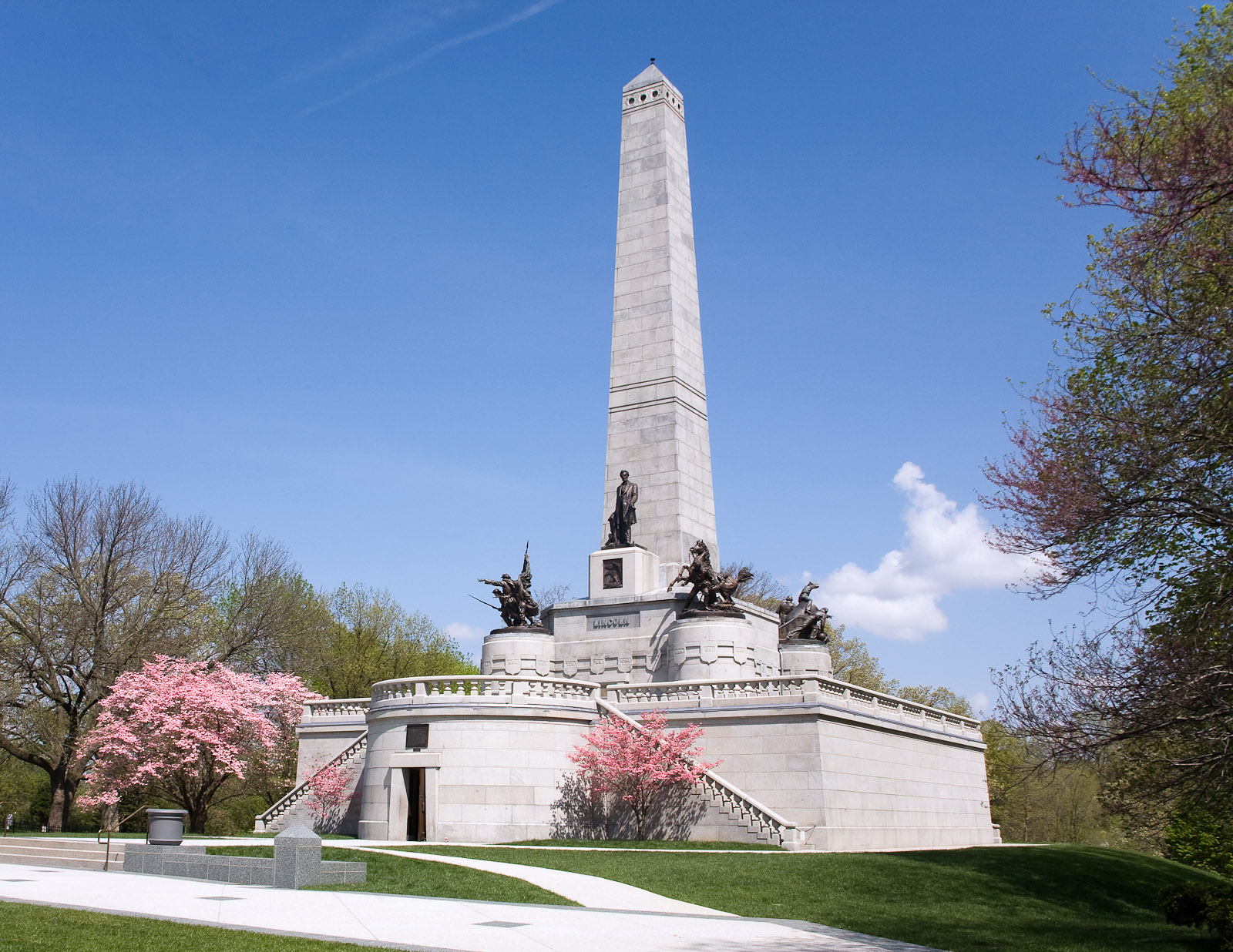
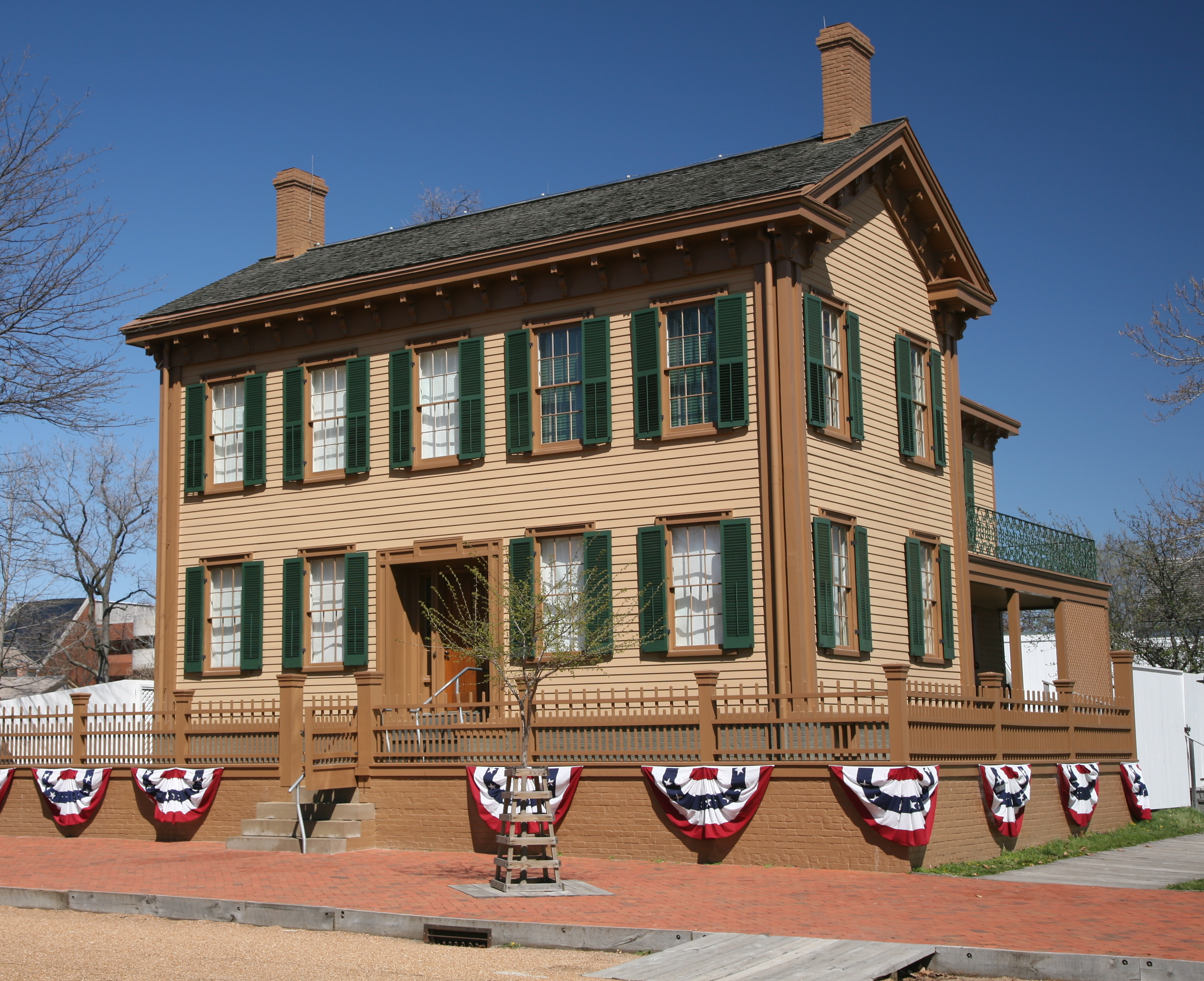
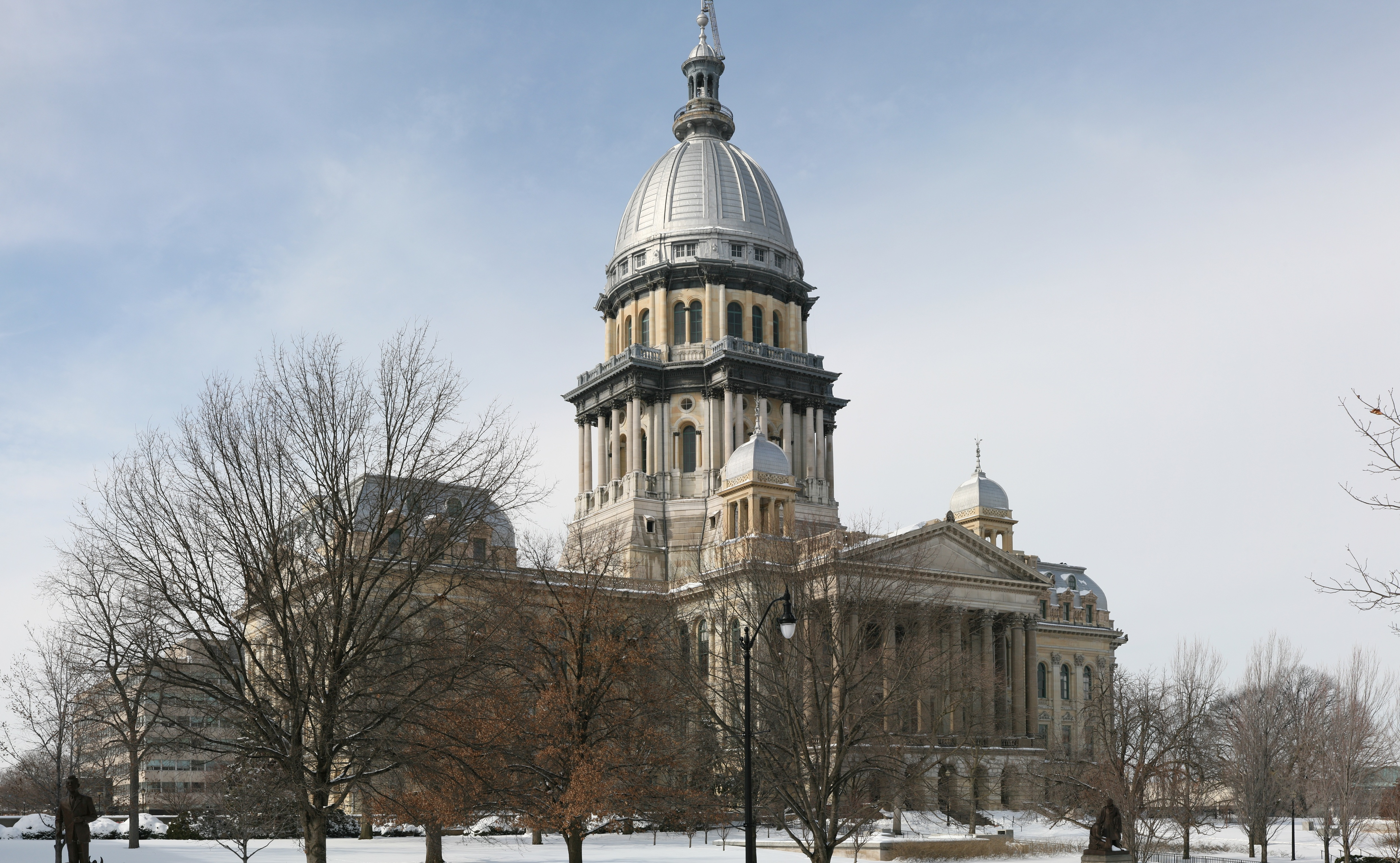
- Downtown Springfield and Old State Capitol Dana-Thomas House Illinois State Museum Lincoln Tomb Abraham Lincoln Home Illinois State Capitol

- Flag Seal
- Motto: Home of President Abraham Lincoln
- Interactive map of Springfield
- Location within Illinois Location within the United States
- Coordinates: 39°47′51″N 89°38′42″W
- Country: United States
- State: Illinois
- County: Sangamon
- Townships: Capital, Springfield, Woodside
- Founded: April 10, 1821
- Incorporated Town: April 2, 1832
- City Charter: February 3, 1840

Government
  - Type: Mayor-Council
  - Mayor: Misty Buscher (R)

Area
  - Total: 67.49 sq mi (174.79 km^{2})
  - Land: 61.16 sq mi (158.41 km^{2})
  - Water: 6.32 sq mi (16.38 km^{2})
- Elevation: 600 ft (183 m)

Population (2020)
  - Total: 114,394
  - Estimate (2024): 112,949 ▼
  - Density: 1,870.4/sq mi (722.16/km^{2})
- Time zone: UTC−6 (CST)
  - Summer (DST): UTC−5 (CDT)
- ZIP codes: ZIP codes: 62701–62708, 62711, 62712, 62715, 62716, 62719, 62722, 62723, 62726, 62736, 62739, 62756, 62757, 62761–62767, 62769, 62776, 62777, 62781, 62786, 62791, 62794, 62796
- Area code: 217/447
- FIPS code: 17-167-11046
- GNIS feature ID: 2395940
- Website: springfield.il.us

Springfield is the capital city of the U.S. state of Illinois and the county seat of Sangamon County. Its population was 114,394 at the 2020 United States census, making it the state's seventh-most populous city, the second-most populous outside of the Chicago metropolitan area (after Rockford) and the most populous in Central Illinois. Approximately 208,000 residents live in the Springfield metropolitan area which consists of all of Sangamon and Menard counties.

The city lies in a plain near the Sangamon River north of Lake Springfield and is located along historic Route 66.

Springfield was settled by European-Americans in the late 1810s, around the time Illinois became a state. The most famous historic resident was Abraham Lincoln, who lived in Springfield from 1837 until 1861, when he became President of the United States. Major tourist attractions include multiple sites connected with Lincoln, such as the Abraham Lincoln Presidential Library and Museum, the Lincoln Home, the Old State Capitol, the Lincoln-Herndon Law Offices, and the Lincoln Tomb. Largely on the efforts of Lincoln and other area lawmakers, as well as its central location, Springfield was made the state capital in 1839.

As the state capital, the government of Illinois is based in Springfield. Springfield's economy is dominated by government agencies and adjacent firms that work with state and county governance, in addition to healthcare and medicine. State government institutions include the Illinois General Assembly, the Illinois Supreme Court, the office of the Governor of Illinois and the historic Illinois Governor's Mansion. The University of Illinois Springfield has its campus near Lake Springfield. Weather is fairly typical for middle-latitude locations, with four distinct seasons. The city has a mayor–council form of government and governs the Capital Township. Public schools in Springfield are operated by District No. 186.

== History ==
=== Pre-Civil War ===
Settlers originally named this community "Calhoun", after Senator John C. Calhoun of South Carolina, expressing their cultural ties. The land that Springfield now occupies was visited first by trappers and fur traders who came to the Sangamon River in 1818.

The first cabin was built in 1820 by John Kelly, after he discovered that the area was plentiful with deer and other wild game. He built his cabin on a hill, overlooking a creek known eventually as the Town Branch. A stone marker on the north side of Jefferson street, halfway between 1st and College streets, marks the location of this original dwelling. A second stone marker at the northwest corner of 2nd St. and Jefferson St., often mistaken for the original home site, marks instead the location of the first county courthouse, which was later built on Kelly's property. In 1821, Calhoun was designated as the county seat of Sangamon County due to its location, fertile soil, and trading opportunities.

Settlers from Kentucky, Virginia, and North Carolina came to the developing settlement. By 1832, Senator Calhoun had fallen out of the favor with the public, and the town renamed itself as Springfield. According to local history, the name was suggested by the wife of John Kelly, after Spring Creek, which ran through the area known as "Kelly's Field".

Kaskaskia was the first capital of the Illinois Territory from its organization in 1809, continuing through statehood in 1818, and through the first year as a state in 1819. Vandalia was the second state capital of Illinois, from 1819 to 1839. In 1839, Springfield was designated as the third capital. The designation was largely due to the efforts of Abraham Lincoln and his associates, who were nicknamed the "Long Nine" for their combined height of 54 feet (16 m).

The Potawatomi Trail of Death passed through Springfield in 1838. The Native Americans were forced west to Indian Territory by the government's Indian Removal policy.

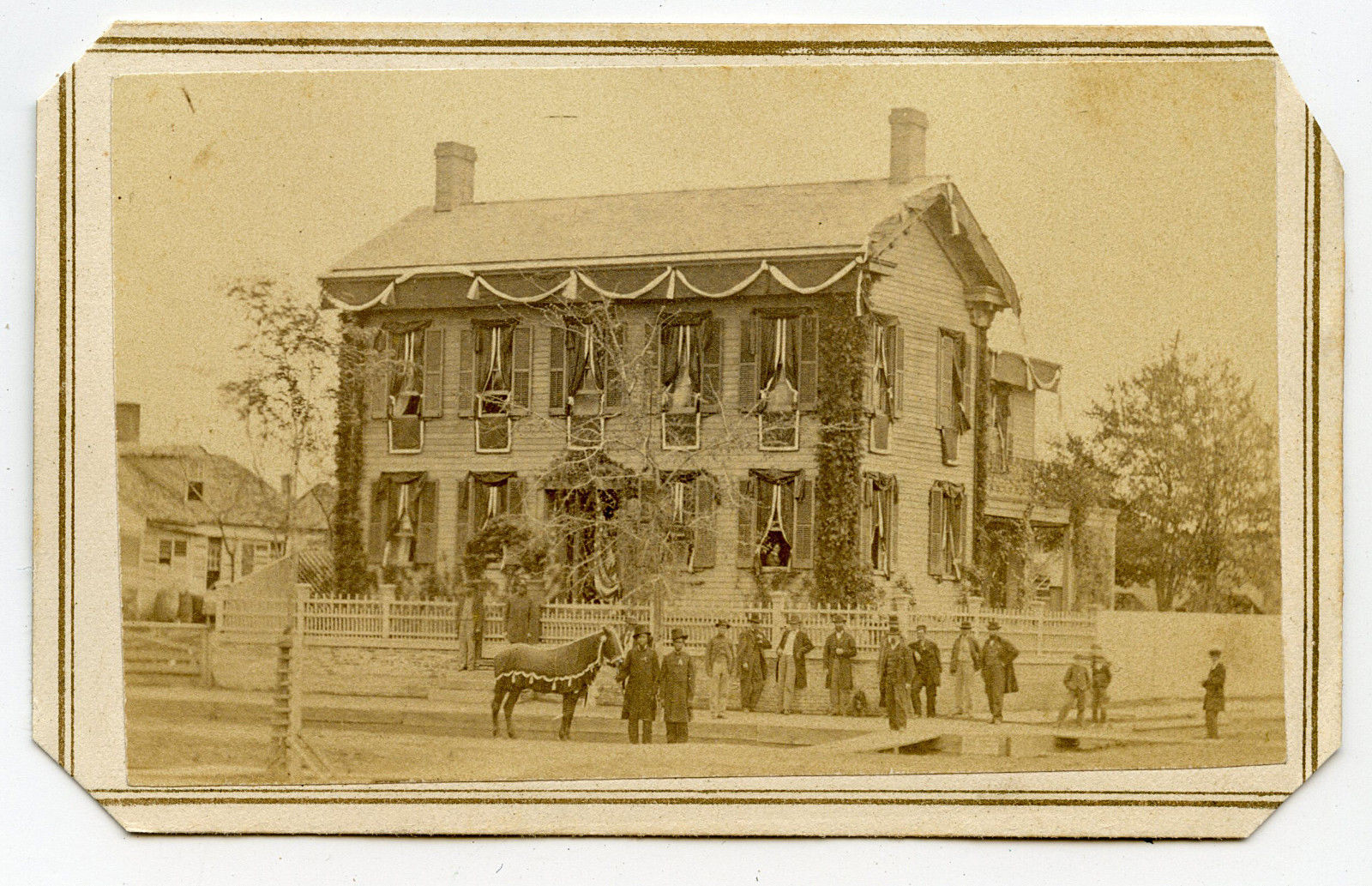
Abraham Lincoln's Springfield home in 1865 during Lincoln's funeral

Abraham Lincoln arrived in the Springfield area in 1831, but he did not live in the city until 1837. He spent the next six years in New Salem, where he began his legal studies, joined the state militia, and was elected to the Illinois General Assembly.

In 1837, Lincoln moved to Springfield, where he lived and worked for the next 24 years as a lawyer and politician. Lincoln delivered his Lyceum address in Springfield. Abraham Lincoln's farewell address when he left for Washington is a classic in American oratory.

Historian Kenneth J. Winkle (1998) examines the historiography concerning the development of the Second Party System (Whigs versus Democrats). He applied these ideas to the study of Springfield, a strong Whig enclave in a Democratic region. He chiefly studied poll books for presidential years. The rise of the Whig Party took place in 1836 in opposition to the presidential candidacy of Martin Van Buren and was consolidated in 1840. Springfield Whigs tend to validate several expectations of party characteristics as they were largely native-born, either in New England or Kentucky, professional or agricultural in occupation, and devoted to partisan organization. Abraham Lincoln's career reflects the Whigs' political rise but, by the 1840s, Springfield began to be dominated by Democratic politicians. Waves of new European immigrants had changed the city's demographics, and they became aligned with the Democrats, who made more effort to assist and connect with them. By the 1860 presidential election, Lincoln was barely able to win his home city.

==== Population ====
Winkle earlier had studied the effect of migration on residents' political participation in Springfield during the 1850s. Widespread migration in the 19th-century United States produced frequent population turnover within Midwestern communities, which influenced patterns of voter turnout and office-holding. Examination of the manuscript census, poll books, and office-holding records reveals the effects of migration on the behavior and voting patterns of 8,000 participants in 10 elections in Springfield. Most voters were short-term residents who participated in only one or two elections during the 1850s. Fewer than 1% of all voters participated in all 10 elections.

Instead of producing political instability, however, rapid turnover enhanced the influence of the more stable residents. Migration was selective by age, occupation, wealth, and birthplace. Longer-term or "persistent" voters, as Winkle terms them, tended to be wealthier, more highly skilled, more often native-born, and socially more stable than non-persisters. Officeholders were particularly persistent and socially and economically advantaged. Persisters represented a small "core community" of economically successful, socially homogeneous, and politically active voters and officeholders who controlled local political affairs, while most residents moved in and out of the city. Members of a tightly knit and exclusive "core community", exemplified by Abraham Lincoln, blunted the potentially disruptive impact of migration on local communities.

==== Business ====
The case of John Williams illustrates the important role of the merchant banker in the economic development of central Illinois before the Civil War. Williams began his career as a clerk in frontier stores and saved to begin his own business. Later, in addition to operating retail and wholesale stores, he acted as a local banker and organized a national bank in Springfield. He was active in railroad promotion and as an agent for farm machinery.

==== Religion ====
During the mid-19th century, the spiritual needs of German Lutherans in the Midwest were not being tended. There had been a wave of migration after the 1848 revolutions, but without a related number of clergy. As a result of the efforts of such missionaries as Friedrich Wyneken, Wilhelm Loehe, and Wilhelm Sihler, additional Lutheran ministers were sent to the Midwest, Lutheran schools were opened, and Concordia Theological Seminary was founded in Ft. Wayne, Indiana in 1846.

The seminary moved to St. Louis, Missouri, in 1869 and then to Springfield in 1874. During the last half of the 19th century and the first half of the 20th century, the Lutheran Church–Missouri Synod succeeded in serving the spiritual needs of Midwestern congregations by establishing additional seminaries from ministers trained at Concordia and by developing a viable synodical tradition.

=== Civil War to 1900 ===
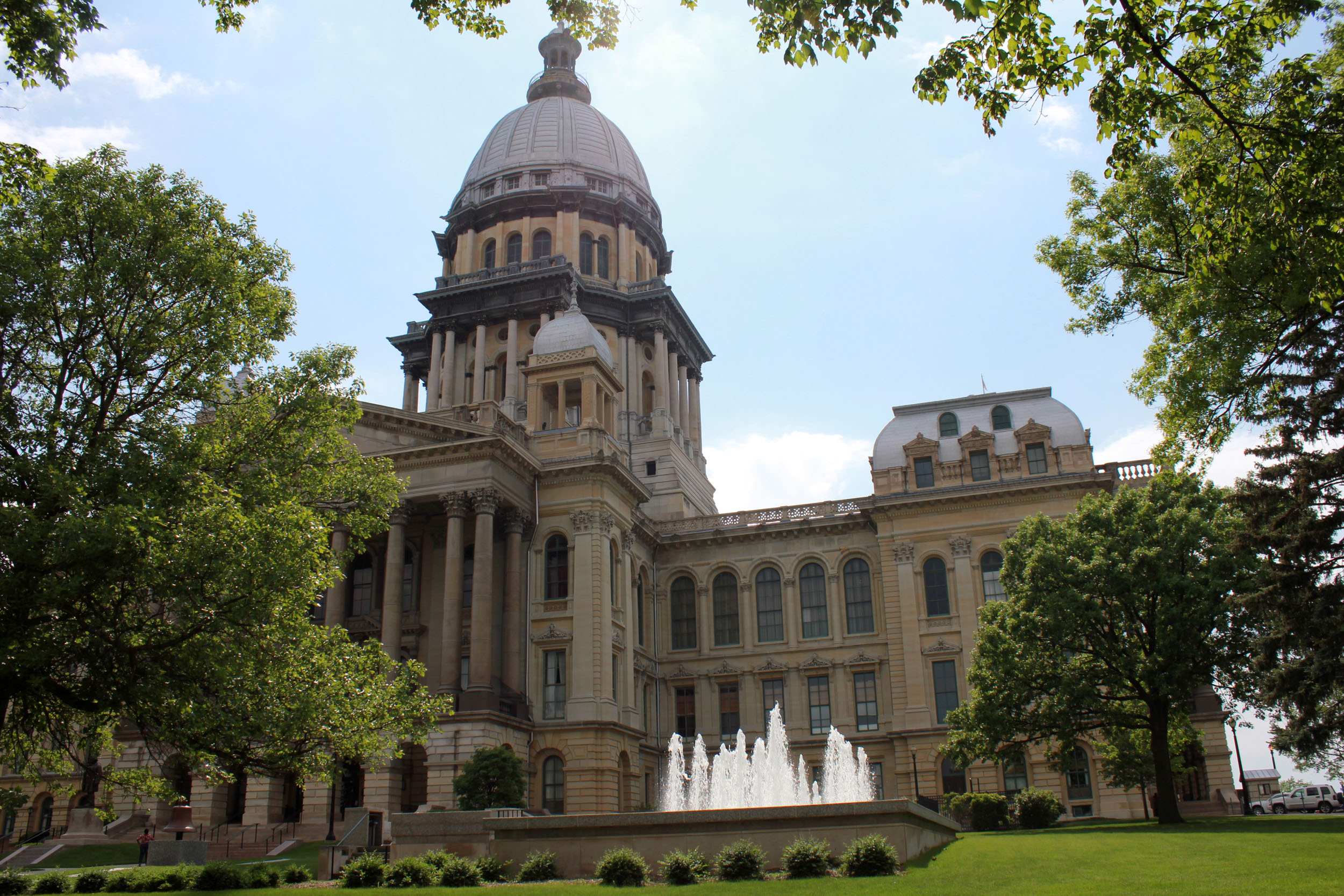
Present Capitol building, built c. 1868–1888

Springfield became a major center of activity during the American Civil War. Illinois regiments trained there, the first ones under Ulysses S. Grant. He led his soldiers to a remarkable series of victories in 1861–62. The city was a political and financial center of Union support. New industries, businesses, and railroads were constructed to help support the war effort. The war's first official death was a Springfield resident, Colonel Elmer E. Ellsworth.

Camp Butler, located seven miles (11 km) northeast of Springfield, Illinois, opened in August 1861 as a training camp for Illinois soldiers. It also served as a camp for Confederate prisoners of war through 1865. In the beginning, Springfield residents visited the camp to take part in the excitement of a military venture, but many reacted sympathetically to mortally wounded and ill prisoners. While the city's businesses prospered from camp traffic, drunken behavior and rowdiness on the part of the soldiers stationed there strained relations. Neither civil nor military authorities proved able to control disorderly outbreaks.

After the war ended in 1865, Springfield became a major hub in the Illinois railroad system. It was a center of government and farming, and by 1900, it had also become involved in coal mining and processing.

=== 20th century ===
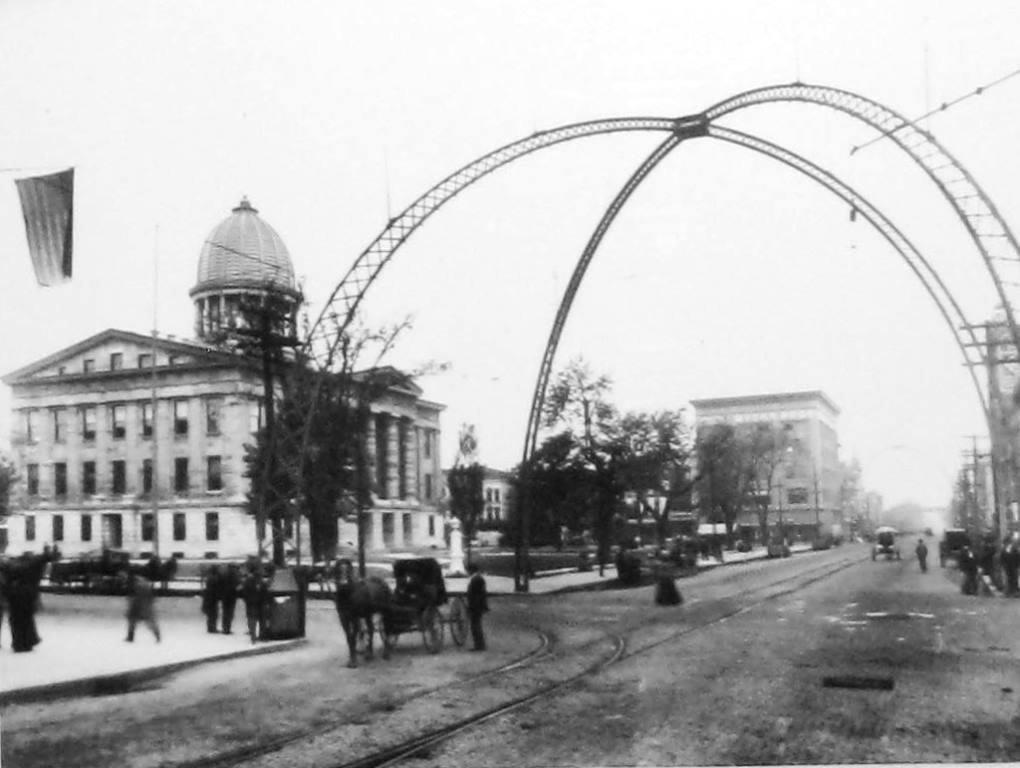
Intersection of 5th and Adams c. 1905

==== Utopia ====
Local poet Vachel Lindsay's notions of utopia were expressed in his only novel, The Golden Book of Springfield (1920), which draws on ideas of anarchistic socialism in projecting the progress of Lindsay's hometown toward utopia.

The Dana–Thomas House is a Frank Lloyd Wright design built in 1902–03. Wright began work on the house in 1902. Commissioned by Susan Lawrence Dana, a local patron of the arts and public benefactor, Wright designed a house to harmonize with the owner's devotion to the performance of music. Coordinating art glass designs for 250 windows, doors, and panels as well as over 200 light fixtures, Wright enlisted Oak Park artisans. The house is a radical departure from Victorian architectural traditions. Covering 12,000 square feet (1,100 m^{2}), the house contained vaulted ceilings and 16 major spaces. As the nation was changing, so Wright intended this structure to reflect the changes. Creating an organic and natural atmosphere, Wright saw himself as an "architect of democracy" and intended his work to be a monument to America's social landscape.

It is the only historic site later acquired by the state exclusively because of its architectural merit. The structure was opened to the public as a museum house in September 1990; tours are available, 9:00 a.m.–4:00 p.m. Wednesdays through Sundays.

==== 1908 race riot ====
Sparked by the alleged rape of a White woman by a Black man and the murder of a White engineer, supposedly also by a Black man, in Springfield, and reportedly angered by the high degree of corruption in the city, rioting broke out on August 14, 1908, and continued for three days in a period of violence known as the Springfield race riot. Gangs of White youth and blue-collar workers attacked the city’s predominantly Black neighborhoods — such as the Levee District, where most Black-owned businesses were located, and the Badlands, where many Black residents lived. At least sixteen people died as a result of the riot: nine Black residents, and seven White residents who were associated with the mob, five of whom were killed by state militia and two committed suicide. The riot ended when the governor sent in more than 3,700 militiamen to patrol the city, but isolated incidents of White violence against Black residents continued in Springfield into September.

=== 21st century ===
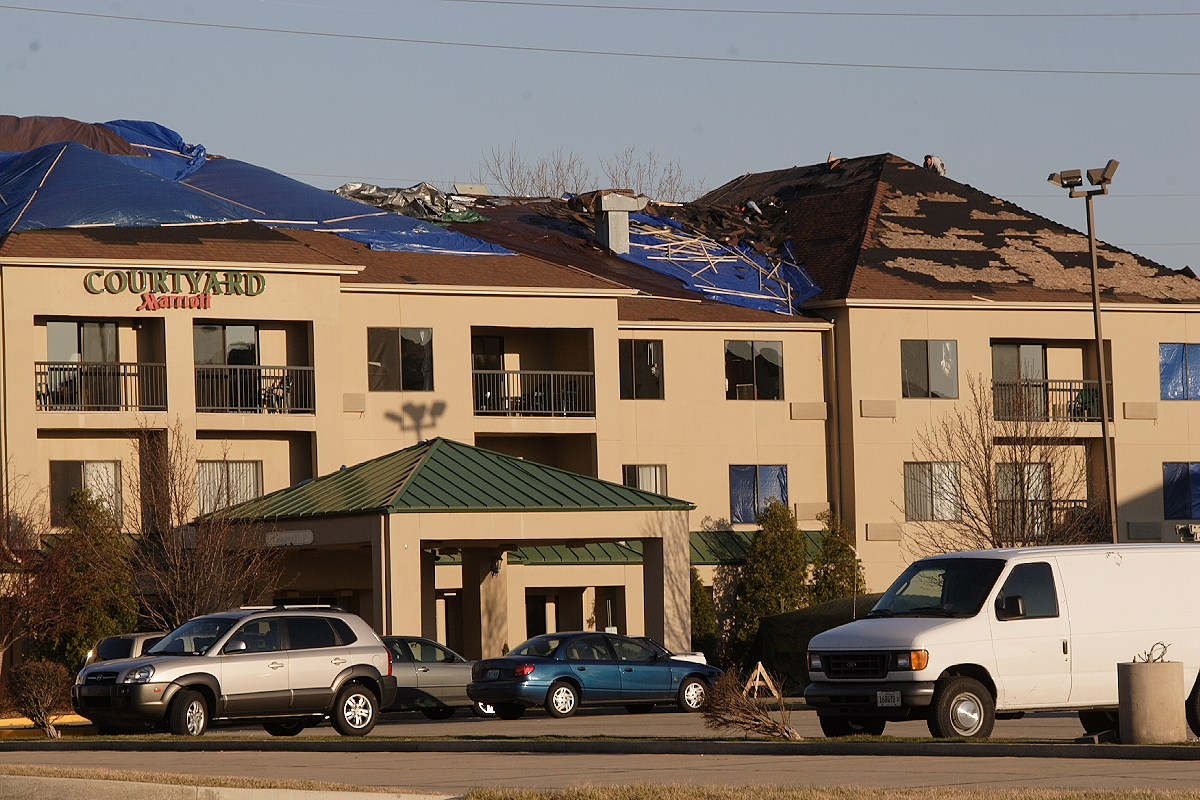
a Courtyard Marriott Location damaged by the 2006 Springfield tornadoes

On March 12, 2006, two F2 tornadoes hit the city, injuring 24 people, damaging hundreds of buildings, and causing $150 million in damages.

On February 10, 2007, then-senator Barack Obama announced his presidential candidacy in Springfield, standing on the grounds of the Old State Capitol. Senator Obama also used the Old State Capitol in Springfield as a backdrop when he announced Joe Biden as his running mate on August 23, 2008.

== Geography ==
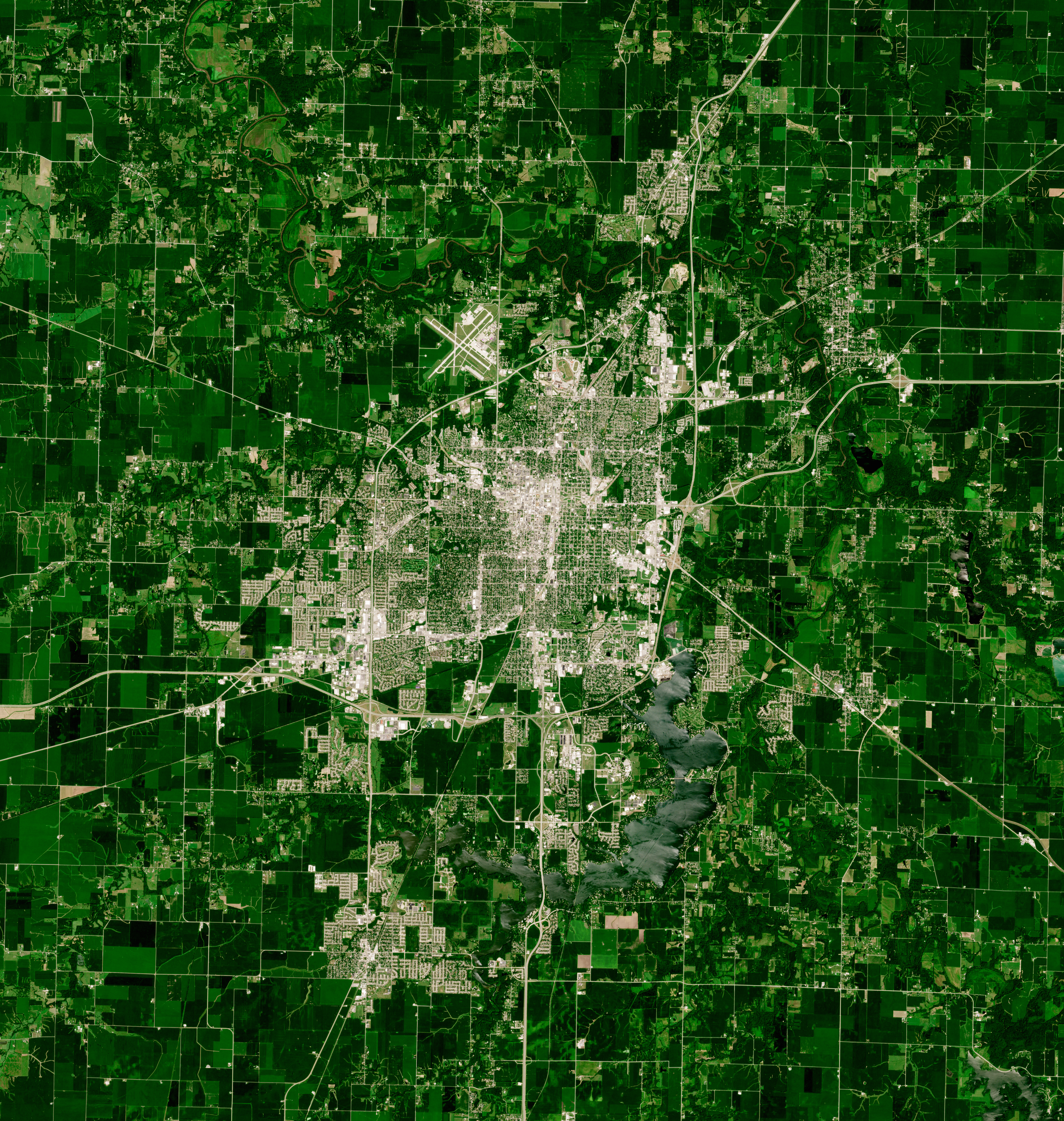
Satellite image of Springfield taken from ESA Sentinel-2

Located within the central section of Illinois, Springfield is 80 miles (130 km) northeast of St. Louis. The Champaign/Urbana area is to the east, Peoria is to the north, and Bloomington–Normal is to the northeast. Decatur is 40 miles (64 km) due east. Chicago is 200 miles to the northeast.

=== Topography ===
The city is at an elevation of 558 feet (170 m) above sea level. According to the 2010 census, Springfield has a total area of 65.764 square miles (170.33 km^{2}), of which 59.48 square miles (154.05 km^{2}) (or 90.44%) is land and 6.284 square miles (16.28 km^{2}) (or 9.56%) is water. The city is located in the Lower Illinois River Basin, in a large area known as Till Plain. Sangamon County, and the city of Springfield, are in the Springfield Plain subsection of Till Plain. The Plain is underlain by glacial till that was deposited by a large continental ice sheet that repeatedly covered the area during the Illinoian Stage.

The majority of the Lower Illinois River Basin is flat, with relief extending no more than 20 feet (6.1 m) in most areas, including the Springfield subsection of the plain. The differences in topography are based on the age of drift. The Springfield and Galesburg Plain subsections represent the oldest drift, Illinoian, while Wisconsinian drift resulted in end moraines on the Bloomington Ridged Plain subsection of Till Plain.

Lake Springfield is a 4,200-acre (1,700 ha) human-made reservoir owned by City Water, Light & Power, the largest municipally owned utility in Illinois. It was built and filled in 1935 by damming Lick Creek, a tributary of the Sangamon River which flows past Springfield's northern outskirts. The lake is used primarily as a source for drinking water for the city of Springfield, also providing cooling water for the condensers at the power plant on the lake. It attracts approximately 600,000 visitors annually, and its 57 miles (92 km) of shoreline is home to over 700 lakeside residences and eight public parks.

The term "full pool" describes the lake at 560 feet (170 m) above sea level and indicates the level at which the lake begins to flow over the dam's spillway, if no gates are opened. Normal lake levels are generally somewhere below full pool, depending upon the season. During the drought from 1953 to 1955, lake levels dropped to their historical low, 547.44 feet (166.86 m) AMSL. The highest recorded lake levels were in December 1982, when the lake crested at 564 feet (172 m).

=== Climate ===
Under the Köppen climate classification, Springfield falls within either a hot-summer humid continental climate (Dfa) if the 32 °F (0 °C) isotherm is used or a humid subtropical climate (Cfa) if the 27 °F (−3 °C) isotherm is used. In recent years, winter temperatures have increased substantially while summer temperatures have remained equal to the period 30 years before. Hot, humid summers and cold, rather snowy winters are the norm. Springfield is located on the farthest reaches of Tornado Alley, and as such, thunderstorms are a common occurrence throughout the spring and summer. From 1961 to 1990 the city of Springfield averaged 35.25 inches (895 mm) of precipitation per year. During that same period the average yearly temperature was 52.4 °F (11.3 °C), with a summer maximum of 76.5 °F (24.7 °C) in July and a winter minimum of 24.2 °F (−4.3 °C) in January.

From 1971 to 2000, NOAA data showed that Springfield's annual mean temperature increased slightly to 52.7 °F (11.5 °C). During that period, July averaged 76.3 °F (24.6 °C), while January averaged 25.1 °F (−3.8 °C).

From 1981 to 2010, NOAA data showed that Springfield's annual mean temperature increased slightly to 53.1 °F (11.7 °C). During that period, July averaged 76.0 °F (24.4 °C), while January averaged 26.9 °F (−2.8 °C).

From 1991 to 2020, NOAA's latest dataset showed a continued increase in the annual mean to 54.0 °F (12.2 °C). During that period, July averaged 76.5 °F (24.7 °C), while January averaged 27.9 °F (−2.3 °C).

On June 14, 1957, a tornado hit Springfield, killing two people. On March 12, 2006, the city was struck by two F2 tornadoes. The storm system that brought the two tornadoes hit the city around 8:30pm; no one died as a result of the weather. Springfield received a federal grant in February 2005 to help improve its tornado warning systems and new sirens were put in place in November 2006 after eight of the sirens failed during an April 2006 test, shortly after the tornadoes hit. The cost of the new sirens totaled $983,000. Although tornadoes are not uncommon in central Illinois, the March 12 tornadoes were the first to hit the actual city since the 1957 storm. The 2006 tornadoes followed nearly identical paths to that of the 1957 tornado.

Climate data for Springfield, Illinois (Abraham Lincoln Capital Airport), 1991–2020 normals, extremes 1879–present
Month	Jan	Feb	Mar	Apr	May	Jun	Jul	Aug	Sep	Oct	Nov	Dec	Year
Record high °F (°C)	73 (23)	80 (27)	92 (33)	90 (32)	101 (38)	104 (40)	112 (44)	108 (42)	102 (39)	93 (34)	83 (28)	74 (23)	112 (44)
Mean maximum °F (°C)	58.1 (14.5)	63.8 (17.7)	74.9 (23.8)	83.5 (28.6)	89.5 (31.9)	93.8 (34.3)	94.5 (34.7)	94.4 (34.7)	91.9 (33.3)	85.8 (29.9)	72.0 (22.2)	62.3 (16.8)	96.5 (35.8)
Mean daily maximum °F (°C)	35.9 (2.2)	41.1 (5.1)	53.1 (11.7)	65.6 (18.7)	75.7 (24.3)	84.0 (28.9)	86.8 (30.4)	85.4 (29.7)	80.2 (26.8)	67.4 (19.7)	52.7 (11.5)	40.7 (4.8)	64.1 (17.8)
Daily mean °F (°C)	27.9 (−2.3)	32.4 (0.2)	43.2 (6.2)	54.4 (12.4)	65.1 (18.4)	73.7 (23.2)	76.5 (24.7)	74.9 (23.8)	68.0 (20.0)	56.0 (13.3)	43.5 (6.4)	32.9 (0.5)	54.0 (12.2)
Mean daily minimum °F (°C)	19.9 (−6.7)	23.7 (−4.6)	33.2 (0.7)	43.3 (6.3)	54.4 (12.4)	63.3 (17.4)	66.2 (19.0)	64.3 (17.9)	55.8 (13.2)	44.6 (7.0)	34.2 (1.2)	25.2 (−3.8)	44.0 (6.7)
Mean minimum °F (°C)	−4.2 (−20.1)	2.4 (−16.4)	12.6 (−10.8)	27.3 (−2.6)	38.1 (3.4)	49.4 (9.7)	54.5 (12.5)	52.4 (11.3)	39.6 (4.2)	26.6 (−3.0)	16.3 (−8.7)	4.1 (−15.5)	−8.4 (−22.4)
Record low °F (°C)	−22 (−30)	−24 (−31)	−12 (−24)	16 (−9)	28 (−2)	39 (4)	48 (9)	43 (6)	31 (−1)	13 (−11)	−3 (−19)	−21 (−29)	−24 (−31)
Average precipitation inches (mm)	2.03 (52)	1.93 (49)	2.76 (70)	3.97 (101)	4.52 (115)	4.61 (117)	3.85 (98)	3.37 (86)	2.86 (73)	3.26 (83)	2.71 (69)	2.15 (55)	38.04 (966)
Average snowfall inches (cm)	6.7 (17)	6.1 (15)	3.1 (7.9)	0.3 (0.76)	0.0 (0.0)	0.0 (0.0)	0.0 (0.0)	0.0 (0.0)	0.0 (0.0)	0.1 (0.25)	1.2 (3.0)	4.3 (11)	21.8 (55)
Average precipitation days (≥ 0.01 in)	9.7	8.9	10.5	11.5	12.6	10.6	8.5	8.2	7.3	9.1	8.8	9.0	114.7
Average snowy days (≥ 0.1 in)	5.2	4.2	1.9	0.3	0.0	0.0	0.0	0.0	0.0	0.1	1.0	3.6	16.3
Average relative humidity (%)	73.4	74.0	71.3	65.3	65.6	66.6	70.4	74.0	71.9	68.4	73.8	77.6	71.0
Mean monthly sunshine hours	160.7	158.7	186.5	225.8	281.2	308.0	320.7	291.0	248.4	214.0	140.2	129.3	2,664.5
Percentage possible sunshine	53	53	50	57	63	69	70	68	66	62	47	44	60
Source: NOAA (sun and humidity 1961–1990)

=== Cityscape ===
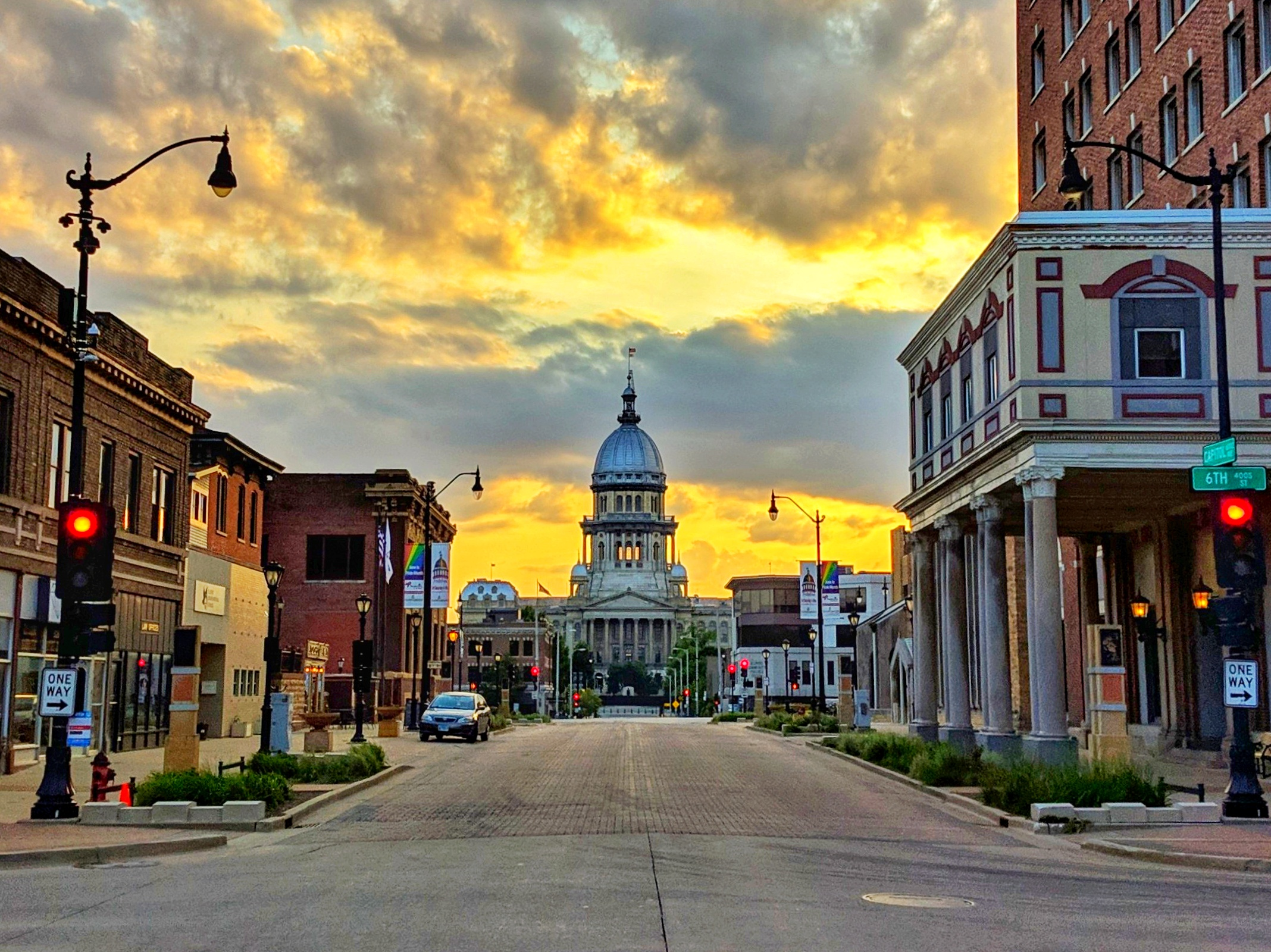
Illinois State Capitol and East Capitol Avenue in 2019

Springfield proper is largely based on a grid street system, with numbered streets starting with the longitudinal First Street (which leads to the Illinois State Capitol) and leading to 32nd Street in the far eastern part of the city. Previously, the city had four distinct boundary streets: North, South, East, and West Grand Avenues. Since expansion, West Grand Avenue became MacArthur Boulevard and East Grand became 19th Street on the north side and 18th Street on the south side. 18th Street has since been renamed after Martin Luther King Jr. North and South Grand Avenues (which run east–west) have remained important corridors in the city. At South Grand Avenue and Eleventh Street, the old "South Town District" lies, with the City of Springfield undertaking a significant redevelopment project there.

Latitudinal streets range from names of presidents in the downtown area to names of notable people in Springfield and Illinois to names of institutions of higher education, especially in the Harvard Park neighborhood.

City neighborhoods

Springfield has at least twenty separately designated neighborhoods, though not all have neighborhood associations. They include: Benedictine District, Bunn Park, Downtown, Eastsview, Enos Park, Glen Aire, Harvard Park, Hawthorne Place, Historic West Side, Lincoln Park, Mather and Wells, Medical District, Near South, Northgate, Oak Ridge, Old Aristocracy Hill, Pillsbury District, Shalom, Springfield Lakeshore, Toronto, Twin Lakes, UIS Campus, Victoria Lake, Vinegar Hill, and Westchester neighborhoods.

The Lincoln Park Neighborhood is an area bordered by 3rd Street on its west, Black Avenue on the north, 8th street on the east and North Grand Avenue. The neighborhood is not far from Lincoln's Tomb on Monument Avenue.

Springfield completely surrounds four suburbs that have their own municipal governments: Jerome, Leland Grove, Southern View, and Grandview. It also surrounds various unincorporated enclaves, including the neighborhoods of Laketown and Cabbage Patch.

== Demographics ==
Historical population
Census	Pop.	Note	%±
1840	2,579		—
1850	4,533		75.8%
1860	9,320		105.6%
1870	17,364		86.3%
1880	19,743		13.7%
1890	24,963		26.4%
1900	34,159		36.8%
1910	51,678		51.3%
1920	59,183		14.5%
1930	71,864		21.4%
1940	75,503		5.1%
1950	81,628		8.1%
1960	83,271		2.0%
1970	91,753		10.2%
1980	99,637		8.6%
1990	105,227		5.6%
2000	111,454		5.9%
2010	116,250		4.3%
2020	114,394		−1.6%
U.S. Decennial Census

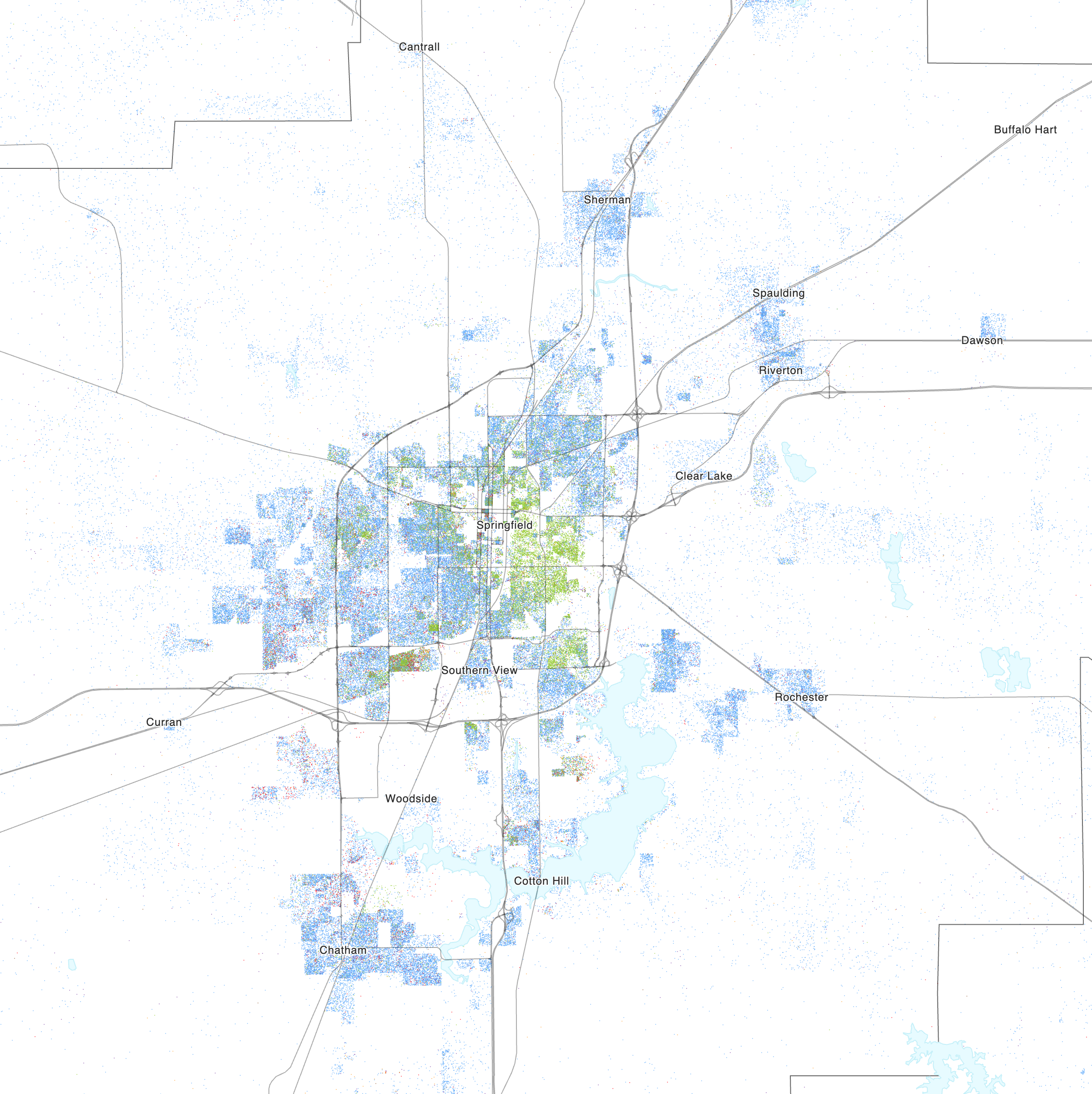
Map of racial distribution in Springfield, 2020 U.S. census. Each dot is one person: ⬤ White ⬤ Black ⬤ Asian ⬤ Hispanic ⬤ Multiracial ⬤ Native American/Other

=== 2020 census ===
Springfield, Illinois – Racial and ethnic composition Note: the US Census treats Hispanic/Latino as an ethnic category. This table excludes Latinos from the racial categories and assigns them to a separate category. Hispanics/Latinos may be of any race.
Race / Ethnicity (NH = Non-Hispanic)	Pop 2000	Pop 2010	Pop 2020	% 2000	% 2010	% 2020
White alone (NH)	89,510	86,781	77,775	80.31%	74.65%	67.99%
Black or African American alone (NH)	17,007	21,344	23,126	15.26%	18.36%	20.22%
Native American or Alaska Native alone (NH)	203	205	191	0.18%	0.18%	0.17%
Asian alone (NH)	1,612	2,538	3,327	1.45%	2.18%	2.91%
Native Hawaiian or Pacific Islander alone (NH)	30	23	42	0.03%	0.02%	0.04%
Other race alone (NH)	204	221	455	0.18%	0.19%	0.40%
Mixed race or Multiracial (NH)	1,551	2,813	5,896	1.39%	2.42%	5.15%
Hispanic or Latino (any race)	1,337	2,325	3,582	1.20%	2.00%	3.13%
Total	111,454	116,250	114,394	100.00%	100.00%	100.00%

At the 2010 Census, 75.8% of the population was White, 18.5% Black or African American, 0.2% American Indian and Alaska Native, 2.2% Asian, and 2.6% of two or more races. 2.0% of Springfield's population was of Hispanic or Latino origin (they may be of any race). Non-Hispanic Whites were 74.7% of the population in 2010, down from 87.6% in 1980.

As of the census of 2000, there were 111,454 people, 48,621 households, and 27,957 families residing in the city. The population density was 2,063.9 people per square mile (796.9 people/km^{2}). There were 53,733 housing units at an average density of 995.0 per square mile (384.2/km^{2}). The racial makeup of the city was 81.0% White, 15.3% African American, 0.2% Native American, 1.5% Asian, 0.1% Pacific Islander, 0.5% from other races, and 1.5% from two or more races. Hispanic or Latino of any race were 1.2% of the population.

There were 48,621 households, out of which 27.5% had children under the age of 18 living with them, 41.1% were married couples living together, 12.9% had a female householder with no husband present, and 42.5% were non-families. 36.1% of all households were made up of individuals, and 11.7% had someone living alone who was 65 years of age or older. The average household size was 2.24 and the average family size was 2.94.

In the city, the population was spread out, with 28.0% under the age of 18, 8.8% from 18 to 24, 29.8% from 25 to 44, 23.0% from 45 to 64, and 14.4% who were 65 years of age or older. The median age was 37 years. For every 100 females, there were 88.6 males. For every 100 females age 18 and over, there were 86.6 males.

The median income for a household in the city was $39,388, and the median income for a family was $51,298. Families with children had a higher income of about $69,437. Males had a median income of $36,864 versus $28,867 for females. The per capita income for the city was $23,324. About 8.4% of families and 11.7% of the population were below the poverty line, including 17.3% of those under age 18 and 7.7% of those age 65 or over.

== Economy ==
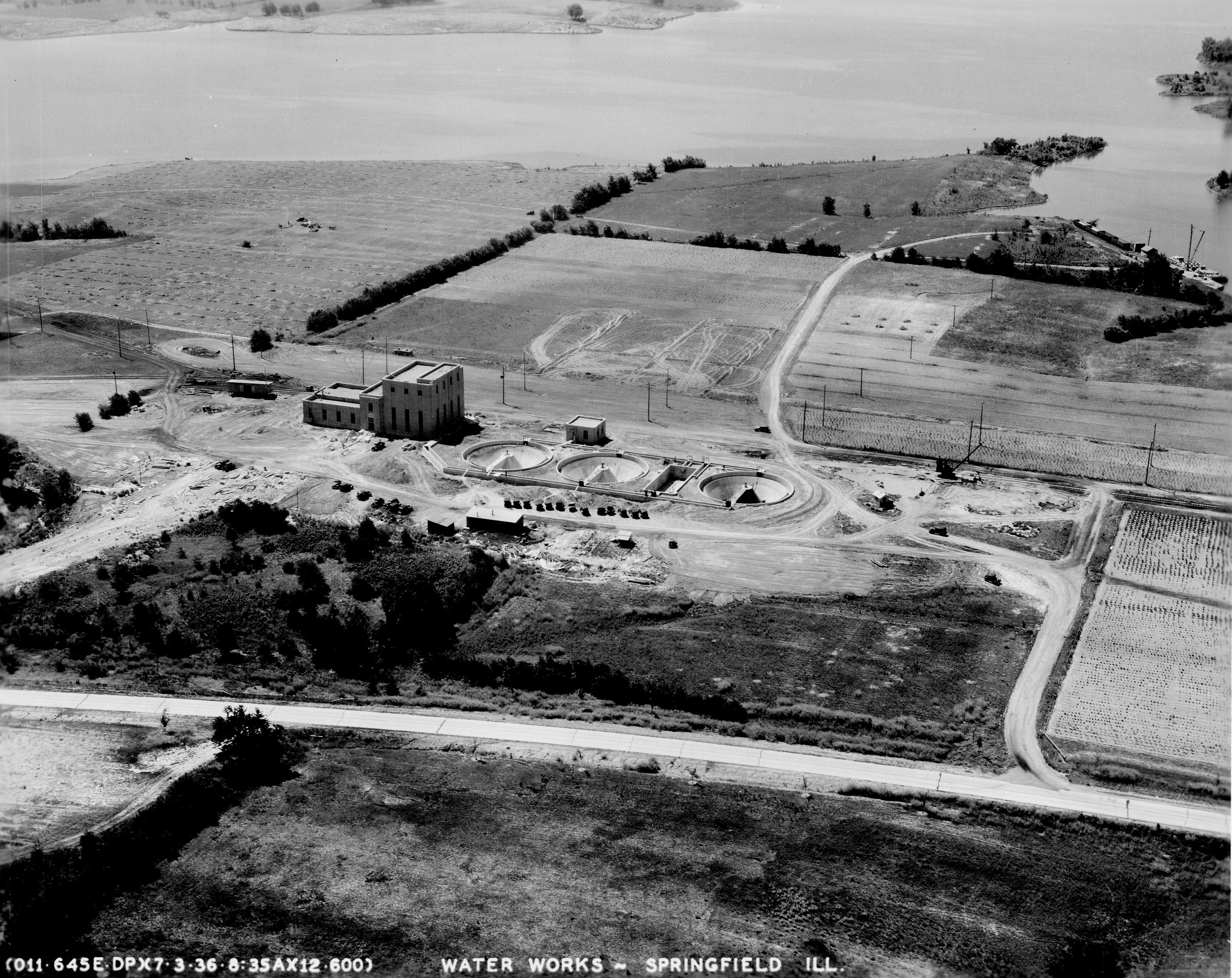
Construction of the water works, 1936

Many of the jobs in the city center around state government, which is headquartered in Springfield. As of 2002, the State of Illinois is both the city's and county's largest employer, employing 17,000 people across Sangamon County. As of February 2007, government jobs, including local, state, and county, account for about 30,000 of the city's non-agricultural jobs. Trade, transportation and utilities, and the health care industries each provide between 17,000 and 18,000 jobs to the city. The largest private sector employer in 2002 was Memorial Health System with 3,400 people working for the organization. According to estimates from the "Living Wage Calculator" the living wage for the city of Springfield is $7.89 per hour for one adult, approximately $15,780 working 2,000 hours per year. For a family of four, costs are increased and the living wage is $17.78 per hour within the city. According to the United States Department of Labor's Bureau of Labor Statistics (BLS), the Civilian Labor force dropped from 116,500 in September 2006 to 113,400 in February 2007. In addition, the unemployment rate rose during the same time period from 3.8% to 5.1%.

=== Largest employers ===
According to the city's 2025 Annual Comprehensive Financial Report, the largest employers in the city are:

No.	Employer	Employees
1	State of Illinois	17,800
2	Memorial Health System	5,238
3	Hospital Sisters Health System	4,434
4	Springfield Clinic	3,400
5	Springfield Public Schools	2,130
6	University of Illinois Springfield	1,642
7	Southern Illinois University School of Medicine	1,470
8	City of Springfield	1,410
9	Horace Mann Educators Corporation	1,066
10	Illinois National Guard	967

== Arts and culture ==
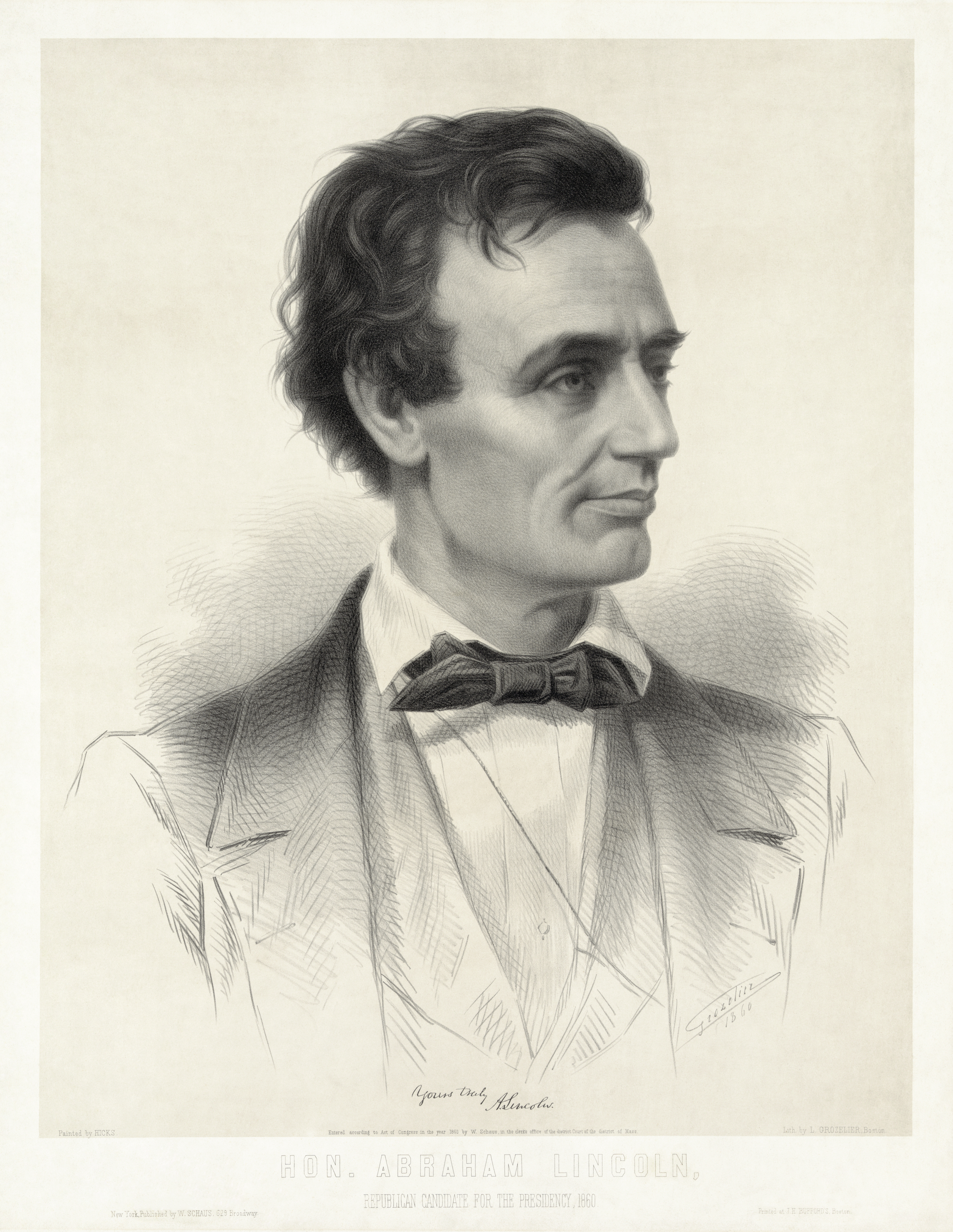
Abraham Lincoln resided in Springfield for 24 years

Springfield has been home to a wide array of individuals who, in one way or another, contributed to the broader American culture. Wandering poet Vachel Lindsay, most famous for his poem "The Congo" and a booklet called "Rhymes to be Traded for Bread", was born in Springfield in 1879. At least two notable people affiliated with American business and industry have called the Illinois state capital home at one time or another. Both John L. Lewis, a labor activist, and Marjorie Merriweather Post, the founder of the General Foods Corporation, lived in the city; Post in particular was a native of Springfield. In addition, astronomer Seth Barnes Nicholson was born in Springfield in 1891.

A Madeiran Portuguese community resided in the vicinity of the Carpenter Street Underpass, one of the earliest and largest Portuguese settlements in the Midwest. The Portuguese immigrants that originated the community left Madeira because they experienced social ostracization due to being Protestants in their largely Catholic homeland, having been converted to Protestantism by a Scottish reverend named Robert Reid Kalley, who visited Madeira in 1838. These Protestant Madeiran exiles relocated to the Caribbean island of Trinidad before settling permanently in Springfield in 1849. By the early twentieth century, these immigrants resided in the western extension of a neighborhood known as the "Badlands". The Badlands was included in the widespread destruction and violence of the Springfield Race Riot in August 1908, an event that led to the formation of the National Association for the Advancement of Colored People (NAACP). The Carpenter Street archaeological site possesses local and national significance for its potential to contribute to an understanding of the lifestyles of multiple ethnic/racial groups in Springfield during the nineteenth and early twentieth centuries.

=== Literary tradition ===
Springfield and the Sangamon Valley enjoy a strong literary tradition in Abraham Lincoln, Vachel Lindsay, Edgar Lee Masters, John Hay, William H. Herndon, Benjamin P. Thomas, Paul Angle, Virginia Eifert, Robert Fitzgerald, and William Maxwell, among others. The Illinois State Library's Gwendolyn Brooks Building features the names of 35 Illinois authors etched on its exterior fourth floor frieze. Through the Illinois Center for the Book, a comprehensive resource on authors, illustrators, and other creatives who have published books who have written about Illinois or lived in Illinois is maintained. Springfield is also home to Dr. Benjamin Franklin Stephenson Library and Research Center, located on the grounds of the Daughters of Union Veterans of the Civil War National Headquarters and Museum.

=== Performing arts ===
The Hoogland Center for the Arts in downtown Springfield is a centerpiece for performing arts, and houses among other organizations the Springfield Theatre Centre, the Copper Coin Ballet Company, and the Springfield Municipal Opera, also known as The Muni, which stages community theatre productions of Broadway musicals outdoors each summer. Before being purchased and renamed, the Hoogland Center was Springfield's Masonic Temple. Prior to the Hoogland, the Springfield Theatre Centre was housed in the nearby Legacy Theatre. Sangamon Auditorium, located on the campus of the University of Illinois Springfield also serves as a larger venue for musical and performing acts, both touring and local.

A few films have been created or had elements of them created in Springfield. Legally Blonde 2: Red, White & Blonde was filmed in Springfield in 2003.

Musicians Artie Matthews and Morris Day both once called Springfield home.

Springfield was also home to long-running underground all-ages space The Black Sheep Cafe.

=== Festivals ===
Springfield is home to the annual Springfield Old Capitol Art Fair, a spring festival held annually in the third weekend in May. Since 2002, Springfield has also hosted the 'Route 66 Film Festival', set to celebrate films routed in, based on, or taking part on the famous Route 66.

=== Tourism ===
Springfield is known for several popular food items: the corn dog is claimed to have been invented in the city under the name "Cozy Dog", although there is some debate to the origin of the snack. The horseshoe sandwich, not well known outside of central Illinois, also originated in Springfield. Springfield was once the site of the Reisch Beer brewery, which operated for 117 years under the same name and family from 1849 to 1966.

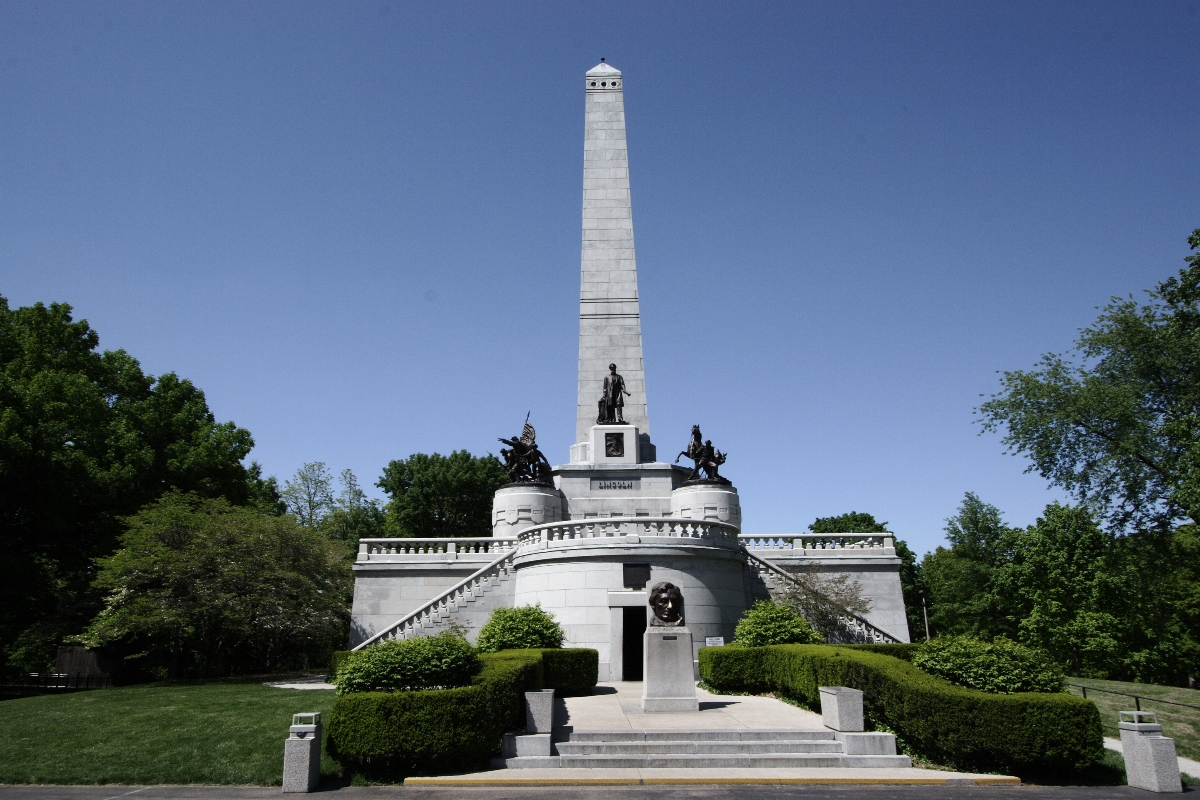
Lincoln's Tomb

The Maid-Rite Sandwich Shop in Springfield still operates what it claims as the first U.S. drive-thru window. The city is also known for its chili ― or "chilli", as it is spelled in many chili shops throughout Sangamon County. The unique spelling is said to have begun with the founder of the Dew Chilli Parlor in 1909, due to a spelling error in its sign. Another interpretation is that the misspelling represented the "Ill" in the word Illinois. In 1993, the Illinois state legislature adopted a resolution proclaiming Springfield the "Chilli Capital of the Civilized World".

Springfield is dotted with sites associated with U.S. President Abraham Lincoln, who started his political career there. These include the Lincoln Home National Historic Site, a National Historical Park that includes the preserved surrounding neighborhood; the Lincoln-Herndon Law Offices State Historic Site, the Lincoln Tomb State Historic Site, the Old State Capitol State Historic Site, the Lincoln Depot, from which Abraham Lincoln departed Springfield to be inaugurated in Washington, D.C.; the Elijah Iles House, Edwards Place and the Abraham Lincoln Presidential Library and Museum. The church that the Lincoln family belonged to, First Presbyterian Church, still has the original Lincoln family pew on display in its narthex. Near the village of Petersburg, is New Salem State Park, a restored hamlet of log cabins. This is a reconstruction of the town where Lincoln lived as a young man. With the opening of the Presidential Library and Museum in 2004, the city has attracted numerous prominent visitors, including Presidents George W. Bush and Barack Obama, the actor Liam Neeson, and the Emir of Qatar.

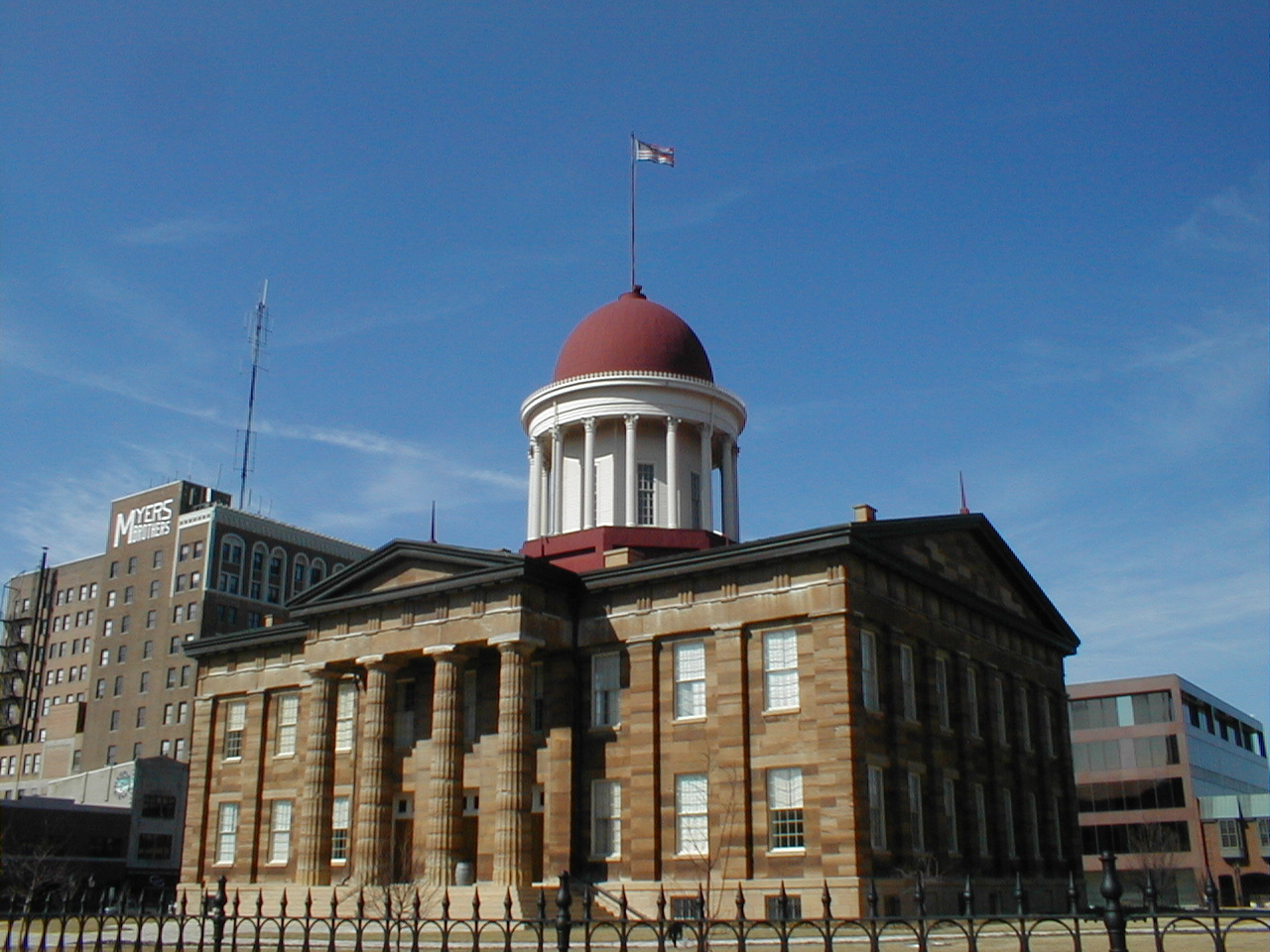
Old State Capitol State Historic Site

The Donner Party, a group of pioneers who resorted to cannibalism while snowbound during a winter in the Sierra Nevada mountains of California, began their journey West from Springfield. Springfield's Dana–Thomas House is among the best preserved and most complete of Frank Lloyd Wright's early "Prairie" houses. It was built in 1902–1904 and has many of the furnishings Wright designed for it. Springfield's Washington Park is home to Thomas Rees Memorial Carillon and the site of a carillon festival, held annually since 1962. In August, the city is the site of the Illinois State Fair at the Illinois State Fairgrounds.

Although not born in Springfield, Lincoln is the city's most famous resident. He lived there for 24 years. The only home he ever owned is open to the public, seven days a week, free of charge, and operated by the National Park Service.

Springfield has the area's largest amusement park, Knight's Action Park and Caribbean Water Park, which is open from May to September. The park also features and operates the city's only remaining drive-in theater, the Route 66 Twin Drive-In.

== Sports ==
team	League	Sport	Venue	Established	Championships
Springfield FC	USL League Two	Soccer	SASA Soccer Complex	2011	0
Springfield Lucky Horseshoes	Prospect League	Baseball	Robin Roberts Stadium	2008	1
Springfield Jr. Blues	North American Hockey League	Ice Hockey	Nelson Center	1993	2
Capital City Hooligans	Men's Roller Derby Association	Men's Roller Derby	Skateland South	2012	N/A

Historically, Springfield has been home to a number of minor league baseball franchises, the latest club, the college-prep Springfield Sliders, arriving in the city in 2008. In the 1948 baseball season, Springfield was also home to an All-American Girls Professional Baseball League team, the Springfield Sallies, but the team's lackluster performance led them to be folded in with the Chicago Colleens as rookie development teams the following year.

The city was the home of the Springfield Stallions, an indoor football team who played at the Prairie Capital Convention Center in 2007. Today, the city is host to the Springfield Jr. Blues, a North American Hockey League team that plays at the Nelson Recreation Center. The city is also a host to several Semi Pro Football Teams. The oldest organization is the Capital City Outlaws, which was established in 1992. The Outlaws which played 11 man football, most recently in The Midwest Football League until 2004, switched to an 8-man Semi Pro Football League (8FL) in 2004. The Sangamon County Seminoles became an expansion team in the 8FL in 2008. A newly formed team in 2010, the Springfield Foxes, play in the Mid States Football League (MSFL) (11 man). The Foxes were league runners-up in the MSFL League Championship in 2012.

The city has produced several notable professional sports talents. Current and former Major League Baseball players Kevin Seitzer, Jeff Fassero, Ryan O'Malley, Jason and Justin Knoedler, and Hall of Famer Robin Roberts were all born in Springfield. Springfield's largest baseball field, Robin Roberts Stadium at Lanphier Park, takes its full name in honor of Roberts and his athletic achievements. Former MLB player Dick "Ducky" Schofield is currently an elected official in Springfield, and his son Dick also played in the Major Leagues, as does Ducky's grandson, Jayson Werth. Ducky, Dick, and Jayson were all born in Springfield. Ducky's daughter (and Jayson's mother) Kim Schofield Werth, also from Springfield, is a track star who competed in the U.S. Olympic Trials. National Basketball Association players Dave Robisch, Kevin Gamble, and Andre Iguodala are all from the city. Long-time NFL announcer (NBC) and former Cincinnati Bengal Pro Bowl tight end Bob Trumpy is a city native, having graduated from Springfield High School. Former NFL wide receiver Otto Stowe was a 1967 graduate of the now-defunct Feitshans High School. A UFC fighter, Matt Mitrione, attended and played football for Sacred Heart Griffin. He also played in the NFL as an undrafted free agent.

At the 2016 Olympics in Rio de Janeiro, Brazil, Springfield native Ryan Held won a gold medal as a member of the USA 400-meter (4 X 100 meter) freestyle relay team along with Caeleb Dressel, Michael Phelps, and Nathan Adrian. During his senior year at Sacred-Heart Griffin High School in 2014, Held was named Illinois State Swimmer of the Year.

=== Parks and recreation ===
The Springfield Park District operates more than 30 parks throughout the city. The two best-known are Carpenter Park, an Illinois Nature Preserve on the banks of the Sangamon River, and Washington Park and Botanical Garden on the city's southwest side and adjacent to some of Springfield's most beautiful and architecturally interesting homes. Washington Park has also been home to the Thomas Rees Memorial Carillon since its dedication in 1962. Southwind Park, on the southern edge of the city, has been developed as a park enjoying full compliance with the Americans with Disabilities Act of 1990. Lincoln Park, located next to Oak Ridge Cemetery where President Lincoln's tomb is located, is home to the Nelson Recreation Center, which boasts a public swimming pool, tennis courts, and the city's only public ice rink, home of the Springfield Junior Blues, a minor league hockey team. Centennial Park, which rests on the outskirts of Springfield's southwest limits, holds one of the city's two public skateparks (the other being in Iles Park), as well as several ball fields, tennis courts, and a manmade hill for cardio exercises and sledding in winter months.

In addition to the public-sector parks operated by the Springfield Park District, two significant privately operated tree gardens/arboretums operate within city limits: the Abraham Lincoln Memorial Garden on Lake Springfield south of the city, and the Adams Wildlife Sanctuary on Springfield's east side.

== Government ==
Springfield city government is structured under the mayor-council form of government. It is the strong mayor variation of that type of municipal government, the mayor holds executive authority, including veto power, in Springfield. The executive branch also consists of 17 non-elected city "offices". Ranging from the police department to the Office of Public Works, each office can be altered through city ordinance.

Elected officials in the city (mayor, aldermen, city clerk, and treasurer) serve four-year terms. The elections are not staggered. The council members are elected from ten districts throughout the city while the mayor, city clerk and city treasurer are elected on an at-large basis. The council, as a body, consists of the ten aldermen and the mayor, though the mayor is generally a non-voting member who only participates in the discussion. There are a few instances where the mayor does vote on ordinances or resolutions: if there is a tie vote, if more than half of the aldermen support the motion, whether there is a tie or not, and where a vote greater than the majority is required by the municipal code.

=== Members ===
City elections are technically non partisan, however most candidates are affiliated with a political party. As such, party affiliation is a matter of self identification.

Springfield elected officials
Citywide positions	Officeholder	Party
Mayor	Misty Buscher	Republican
Treasurer	Colleen Redpath Feger	Republican
Clerk	Frank Lesko	Republican
City council	Officeholder	Party
Ward 1	Chuck Redpath	Republican
Ward 2	Shawn Gregory	Democratic
Ward 3	Roy Williams Jr.	Democratic
Ward 4	Larry Rockford	Unknown
Ward 5	Lakeisha Purchase	Democratic
Ward 6	Jennifer Notariano	Democratic
Ward 7	Brad Carlson	Republican
Ward 8	Erin Conley	Democratic
Ward 9	Jim Donelean	Democratic
Ward 10	Ralph Hanauer	Republican

=== State government ===
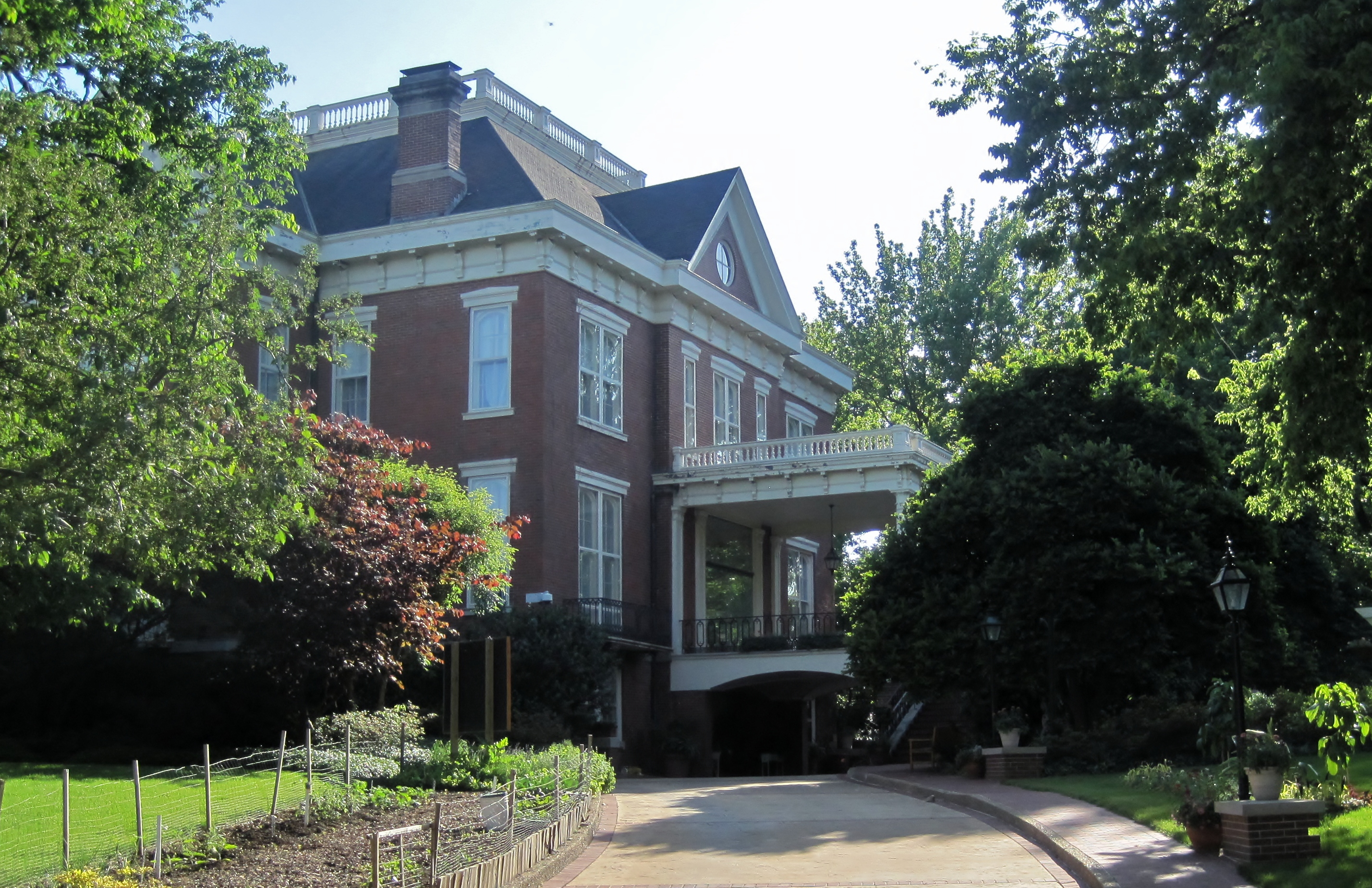
The Illinois Governor's Mansion in 2012

As the state capital, Springfield is home to the three branches of Illinois government. Much like the United States federal government, Illinois government has an executive branch, occupied by the state governor, a legislative branch, which consists of the state senate and house, and a judicial branch, which is topped by the Illinois Supreme Court. The Illinois legislative branch is collectively known as the Illinois General Assembly. Many state bureaucrats work in offices in Springfield, and it is the regular meeting place of the Illinois General Assembly. All persons elected on a statewide basis are required to have at least one residence in Springfield, and the state government funds these residences.

As of 2020 none of the major constitutional officers in Illinois designated Springfield as their primary residence; most cabinet officers and all major constitutional officers instead primarily do their business in Chicago. A former director of the Southern Illinois University Paul Simon Institute for Public Affairs, Mike Lawrence, stated that many of the elected officials in Illinois "spend so little time in Springfield". In 2012 St. Louis Post-Dispatch columnist Pat Gauen argued that "in the reality of Illinois politics, [Springfield] shares de facto capital status with Chicago." Gauen noted that several elected officials such as the Governor, as well as the Attorney General, Speaker of the House, the minority leader of the House, President of the Senate, the minority leader of the Senate, the Comptroller, and the Treasurer, all live in the Chicago area. According to Gauen, "Everybody who's anybody in Illinois government has an office in Chicago"; most state officials work from the James R. Thompson Center in the Chicago Loop. He added that at one point in 2011, Governor Pat Quinn only spent 68 days and 40 nights in Springfield as per his official schedule. University of Illinois researcher and former member of the Illinois legislature Jim Nowlan stated "It's almost like Chicago is becoming the shadow capital of Illinois" and that "Springfield is almost become a hinterland outpost." Lawrence criticized the fact that state officials spent little time in Springfield since it estranged them from and devalued Illinois state employees based in that city.

According to Gauen, "Illinois seems rather unlikely to move its official capital to Chicago".

=== Townships ===
Outline of the Township area and the City of Springfield in Sangamon County

The Capital Township formed from Springfield Township on July 1, 1877, and was established and named by the Sangamon County Board on March 6, 1878. The limits of the township and City of Springfield were made co-extensive on February 17, 1892, but are no longer so with subsequent annexation by the City of Springfield. There are three functions of this township: assessing property, collection first property tax payment, and assisting residents that live in the township. One thing that makes the Capital township unique is that the township never has to raise taxes for road work, since the roads are maintained by the Springfield Department of Public Works.

In the 21st century Springfield annexed large parts of Springfield and Woodside townships. The annexed parcels remained part of their original townships despite being within the Springfield city limits.

=== Law enforcement ===
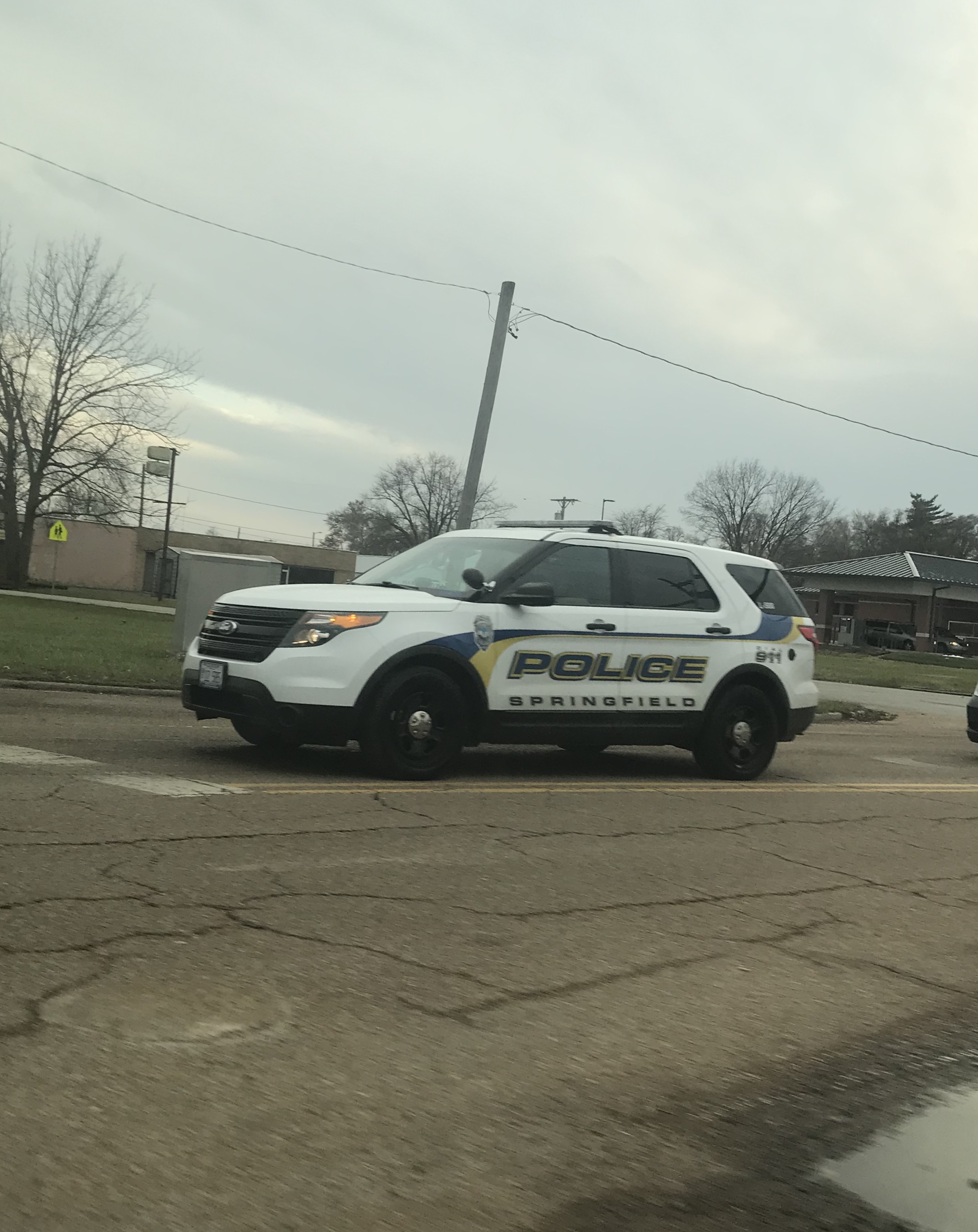
Ford Police Interceptor Utility

The Springfield Police Department was founded in 1840 as part of the city charter. The police chief is Joseph Behl, and as of 2022, the department had 242 employees.

Springfield Police officer Samuel Rosario was arrested by the Illinois State Police on February 28, 2017, after fighting with a teenager on charges of official misconduct and battery. He was found guilty of official misconduct in August 2019.

In 2024, Sangamon County sheriff's deputy Sean Grayson was fired, and subsequently charged with first-degree murder, following the murder of Sonya Massey in Springfield.

== Education ==
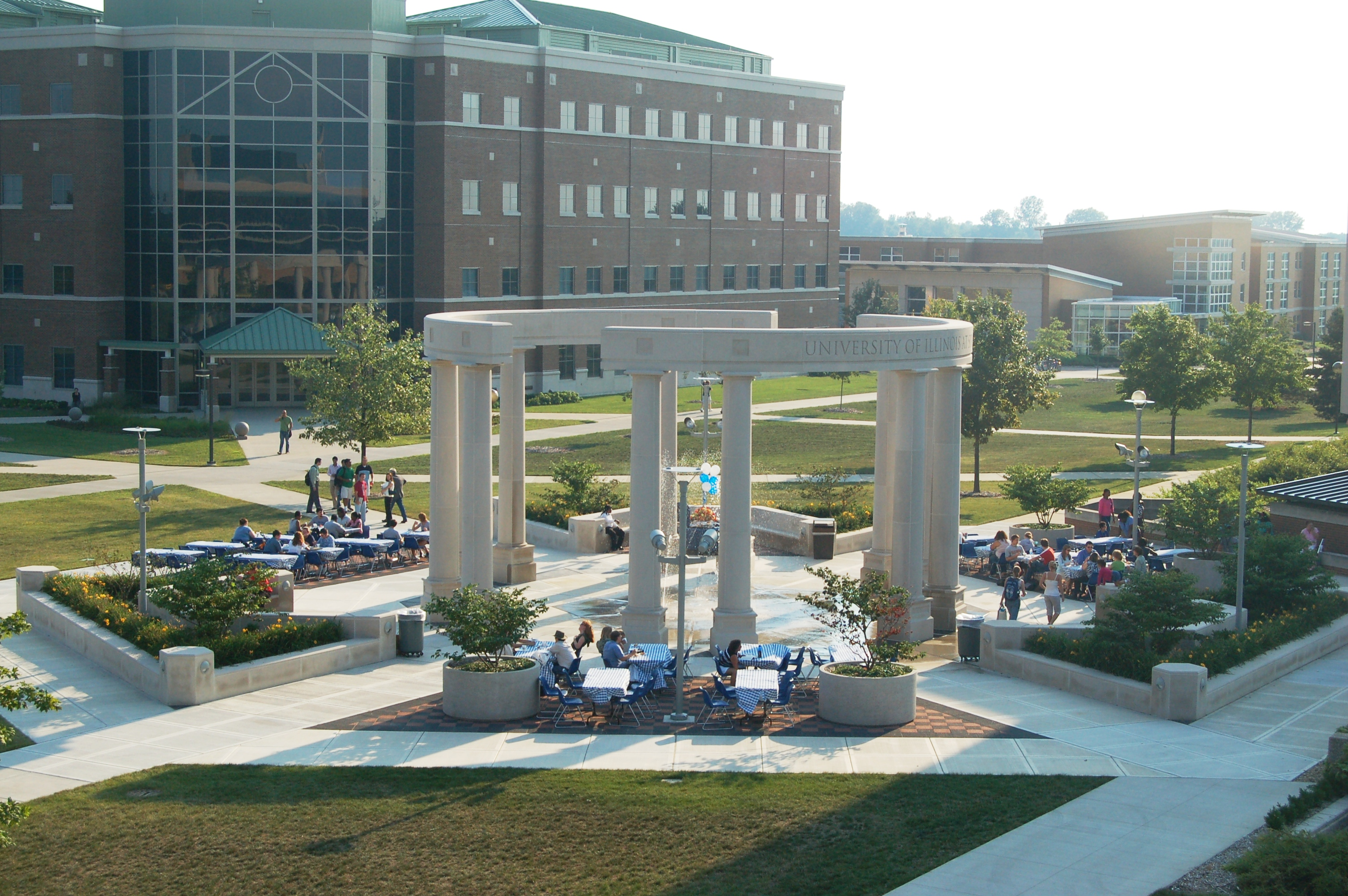
The Colonnade, University of Illinois Springfield

Springfield is currently home to six public and private high schools.

The majority of Springfield is within the District No. 186. District 186 operates 24 elementary schools and an early learning center, (pre-K). District 186 operates three high schools, Lanphier High School, Springfield High School and Springfield Southeast High School, which replaced Feitshans High School in 1967, and five middle schools. Some portions of Springfield are in the Ball-Chatham Community Unit School District 5, the Community Unit School District 16, the Pleasant Plains Community Unit School District 8 the Rochester Community Unit School District 3A, the Riverton Community Unit School District 14 and the Williamsville Community Unit School District 15. By 2019, increasing numbers of residents were moving to school districts on the outskirts instead of D186.

Springfield's Sacred Heart-Griffin High School is a city Catholic high school. Other area high schools include Calvary Academy and Lutheran High School. Ursuline Academy was a second Catholic high school founded in 1857, first as an all-girls school, and converted to co-ed in 1981. The school was closed in 2007.

Springfield hosts one University. The University of Illinois Springfield (UIS, formerly Sangamon State University), which is located on the southeast side of the city.

Springfield is also home to a junior college Lincoln Land Community College, located just south of UIS. From 1875 to 1976, Springfield was also home to Concordia Theological Seminary. The seminary was moved back to its original home of Fort Wayne, Indiana, and the campus now serves as the Illinois Department of Corrections Academy.

The city is home to the Springfield campus of the Southern Illinois University School of Medicine, which includes Simmons Cancer Institute in Springfield's Medical District.

== Media ==
The State Journal-Register is the primary daily newspaper for Springfield, and its surrounding area. The newspaper was founded in 1831 as the Sangamon Journal, and claims to be "the oldest newspaper in Illinois". The local alternative weekly is the Illinois Times.

=== Television stations ===
Springfield is part of the Springfield-Decatur-Champaign TV market. Four TV stations broadcast from the Springfield area: WCIX MYTV 49, WICS ABC 20, WRSP FOX 55, and WSEC PBS 14. Both WICS and WRSP are currently owned by the same parent company Sinclair Broadcast Group. Springfield is also served by two stations in Decatur, WAND NBC 17 and WBUI CW 23, and two stations in Champaign, WCIA CBS 3 and WILL PBS 12. One television station that has since ceased to exist was WJJY-TV, which operated in the Springfield area for three years (1969–1971).

=== Radio stations ===
The following radio stations broadcast in the Springfield area:

- WTTT 88.9 FM
- WLUJ 89.7 FM
- WSCT 90.5 FM
- WUIS 91.9 FM
- WQLZ 92.7 FM
- WTAX-FM 93.9 FM
- WCVS 96.7 FM
- WMAY-FM 97.7 FM
- WNNS 98.7 FM
- WXAJ 99.7 FM
- WYMG 100.5 FM
- WLFZ 101.9 FM
- WDBR 103.7 FM
- WFMB-FM 104.5 FM.
- WMAY 970 AM/94.7 FM and 102.5 FM
- WTAX 1240 AM/93.5 FM
- WFMB 1450 AM/92.3 FM
- WCIC 90.5 FM

== Infrastructure ==
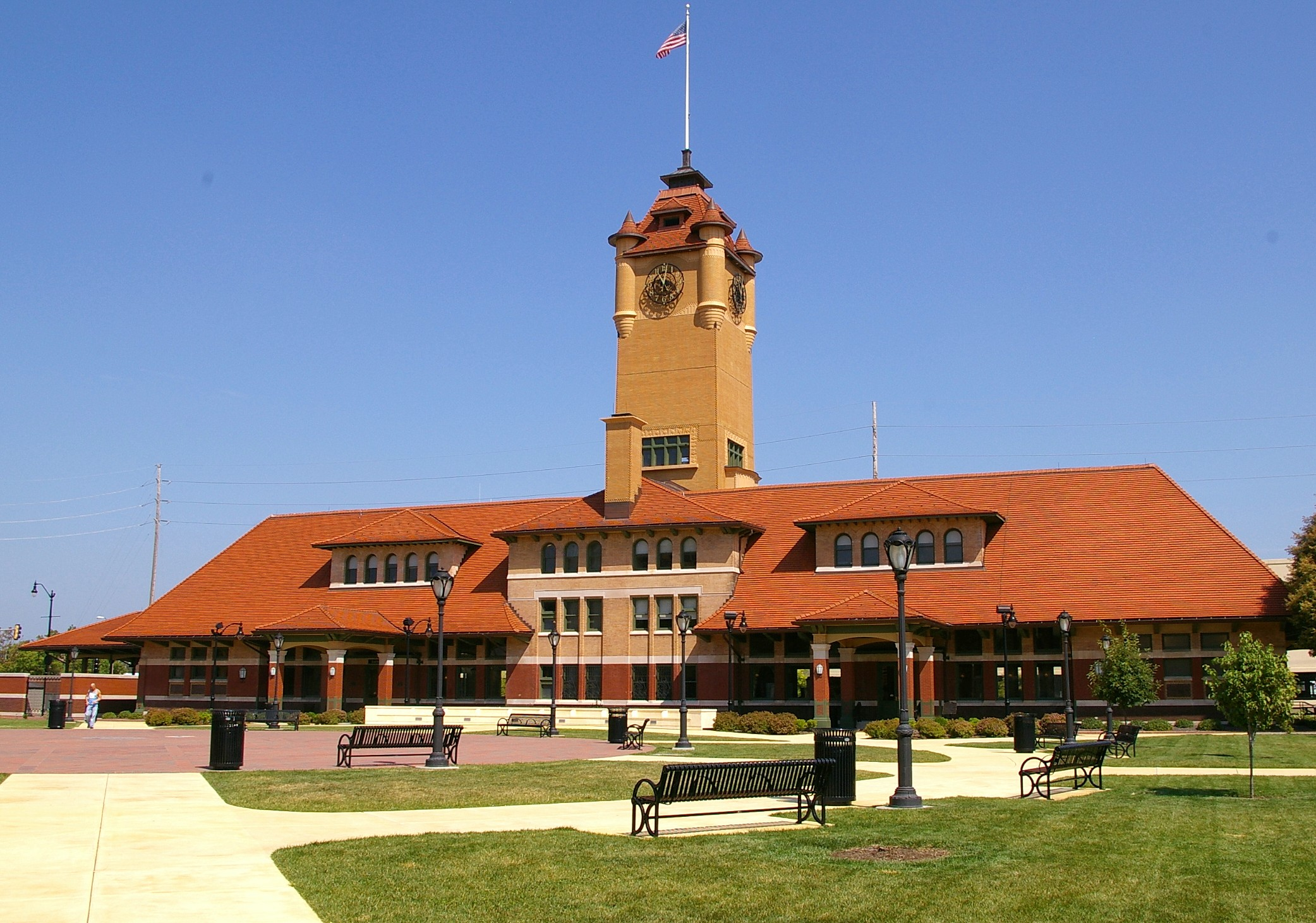
Springfield Union Station

=== Health systems ===
There are two Springfield hospitals, Memorial Medical Center and St. John's Hospital. A third hospital, originally Springfield Community Hospital, and later renamed Doctor's Hospital operated on Springfield's south side until 2003. Kindred Healthcare opened a long term acute care hospital in Springfield in 2010, however, the facility was purchased by Vibra Healthcare in 2013, and was operated by Vibra under the name Vibra Hospital of Springfield until it closed in 2019.

St. John's Hospital is home to the Prairie Heart Institute, which performs more cardiovascular procedures than any other hospital in Illinois. The dominant health care providers in the area are SIU HealthCare and Springfield Clinic. The major medical education center in the area is the Southern Illinois University School of Medicine. The major regional cancer center is the SIU Simmons Cancer Institute.

=== Public utilities ===
The owner of Lake Springfield – City Water, Light & Power – supplies electric power generated from the Dallman Power Plants to the city of Springfield and eight surrounding communities. The company also provides these cities and towns with water from the lake. In 2005, ground was broken for a third municipally owned power plant, which came online in 2009. Natural gas is provided via Ameren Illinois, formerly Central Illinois Light Company (CILCO).

=== Transportation ===
Interstate 55 runs from north to south past Springfield, while I-72, which is concurrent with U.S. Route 36 from the Missouri state line to Decatur, runs from east to west.

Amtrak serves Springfield daily with its Lincoln Service and Texas Eagle routes. Service consists of four Lincoln Service round-trips between Chicago and St. Louis, and one Texas Eagle round-trip between San Antonio and Chicago. Three days a week, the Eagle continues on to Los Angeles. Springfield is served by the following freight railroads: Canadian National, Illinois and Midland Railroad, Kansas City Southern, Norfolk Southern and Union Pacific. Springfield is also served by Greyhound buses at a station on North Dirksen Parkway.

Local mass transportation needs are met by a bus service. The Sangamon Mass Transit District (SMTD) operates Springfield's bus system. The city also lies along historic Route 66.

Border thoroughfare traffic is handled by Veterans Parkway and J. David Jones Parkway on the west side, Everett M. Dirksen Parkway on the east side, Sangamon Avenue on the north end, and Wabash Avenue, Stanford Avenue, and Adlai Stevenson Drive on the south end. The far south corridor is served by Toronto and Woodside Roads. Thoroughfare traffic through the heart of the city is provided by a series of one-way streets. Fifth and Sixth Streets serve the bulk of the north–south traffic, with Seventh Street serving additional traffic between North Grand and South Grand Avenues. East–west traffic is handled by Jefferson Street, entering Springfield on the west side from IL 97, and then splitting into a pair of one-way streets at Amos Avenue (Madison eastbound and Jefferson westbound). The two converge again after Eleventh Street to become Clearlake Avenue, which in turn converges into I-72 eastbound just past Dirksen Parkway. Additional east–west one-way streets run through the downtown areas of Springfield, including Monroe, Adams, Washington, and Cook Streets, as well as a stretch of Lawrence Avenue.

Abraham Lincoln Capital Airport serves the capital city with scheduled passenger jet service to Chicago O'Hare, Fort Myers (via the Punta Gorda Airport) and Orlando.

Springfield and the surrounding metropolitan area have constructed several bike trails; currently, four main trails exist. Two significant paved trails, the Interurban Trail and the Lost Bridge Trail, serve Springfield and its suburbs of Chatham, Illinois and Rochester, Illinois respectively. The Lost Bridge Trail has been extended further into Springfield by the Bunn to Lost Bridge Trail, which follows a stretch of Ash Street and Taylor Avenue. Plans are to extend it further still to Stanford Avenue. A third trail, the Wabash Trail, extends westward from the northern end of the Interurban Trail toward Parkway Pointe, a regional shopping destination. Additionally, several streets contain designated bicycle lanes, and there are multiple class III bicycle routes.

The fourth trail is a section, opened in July 2011, of the Sangamon Valley Trail spanning north to south through the west central part of Sangamon County. The section open as of 2011 extends northward from Centennial Park to Stuart Park. This trail, if completed in its entirety, will reuse the entire Sangamon County portion of the abandoned St. Louis, Peoria and North Western Railway railroad line as a trail that will extend from Girard, Illinois, to Athens, Illinois.

== Sister cities ==
Springfield, Illinois has two sister cities, as designated by Sister Cities International:

- San Pedro, Coahuila (Mexico)
- Ashikaga, Tochigi (Japan)

It maintains a "Friendship" city designation with Killarney, Ireland.

== See also ==
- Camp Butler National Cemetery
- Illinois Executive Mansion
- Illinois Old State Capitol (Springfield)
- Illinois State Capitol
- Lanphier Park
- National Museum of Surveying
- USS Springfield
- USS Springfield (SSN-761)
- White Oaks Mall
