= Washington Park (Springfield, Illinois) =

Historic district in Illinois, United States

- U.S. National Register of Historic Places
- U.S. Historic district
- Location within Illinois Location within the United States
- Location: Bounded by Fayette Ave., Williams Blvd., Walnut St., MacArthur Blvd., S. Grand Ave. and Chatham Rd., Springfield, Illinois
- Area: 150.3 acres (60.8 ha)
- Built: 1901
- Architect: Simonds, Ossian Cole
- Architectural style: Bungalow/craftsman
- Website: Official website
- NRHP reference No.: 92000483
- Added to NRHP: May 22, 1992

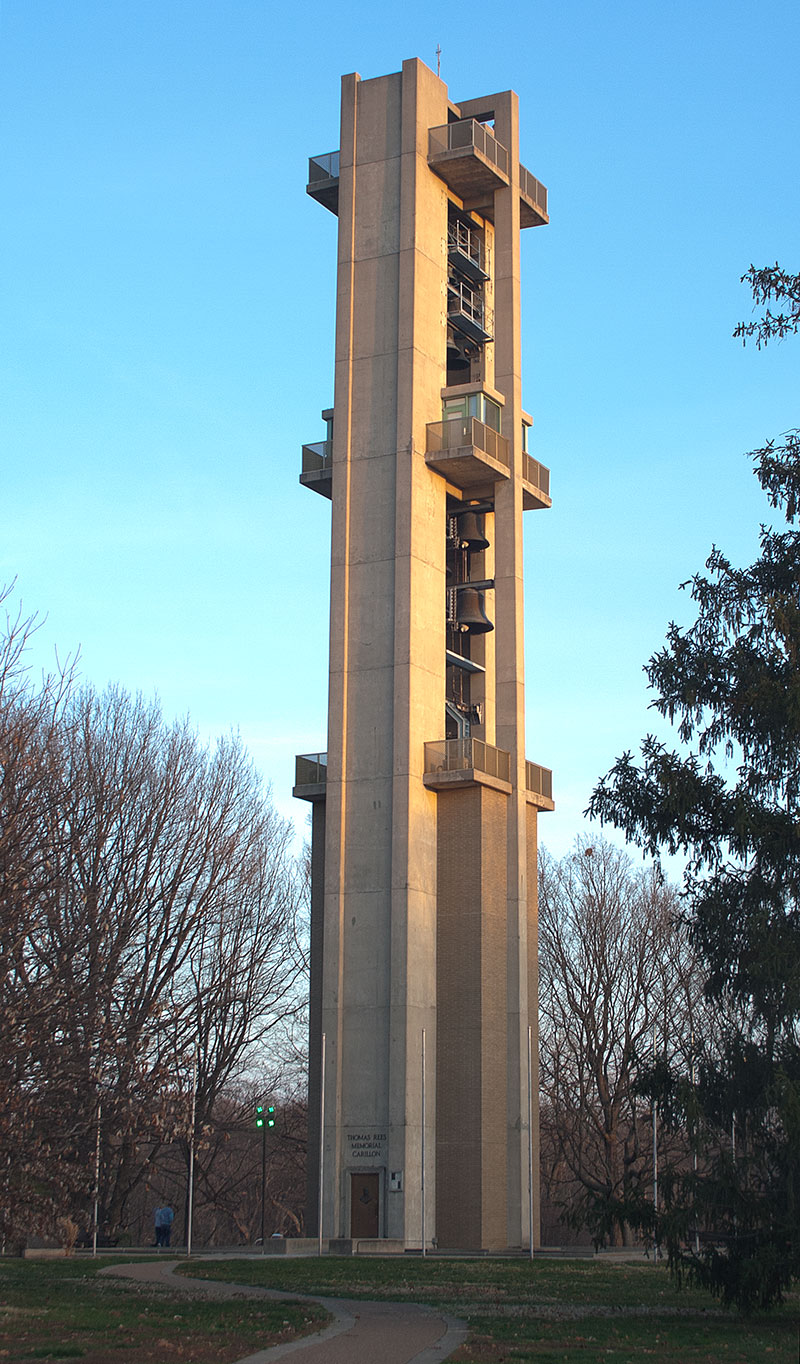
Thomas Rees Memorial Carillon

Washington Park is a park in Springfield, Illinois, listed on the National Register of Historic Places. Located at 1400 Williams Boulevard, the park features walking trails, a botanical garden, large duck pond, rose garden, carillon, and carillon concerts. The park was purchased for city use in 1900, and construction began in 1901. Substantial drainage and dredging were required to turn the wetland portions of the future park into ponds and grassy space. Washington Park is operated by the Springfield Park District.

== Components of park ==
=== Washington Park Botanical Garden ===
The Washington Park Botanical Garden includes a conservatory and botanical garden. It is open daily during the afternoons; admission is free.

The garden consists of outdoor plantings, a greenhouse (9,000 square feet), and a conservatory. In all it contains over 1200 species, including over 150 species of tropical plants. Outdoor gardens include a cactus garden, iris garden, rock garden, and a rose garden (5,000 plants).

=== Thomas Rees Memorial Carillon ===
The carillon, operated by the Springfield Park District, contains 67 bells built by Petit & Fritsen. Concerts are held year round every Sunday and on Wednesday evenings during summer months. Tower tours are available daily.

=== Velasco Tennis Center ===
The Velasco Tennis Center is a tennis facility located in the park. The facility contains 12 courts with six being lighted and a pro shop. It is the home venue for the UIS Prairie Stars men's and women's tennis teams.

== See also ==
- List of botanical gardens in the United States
- List of Registered Historic Places in Illinois
