= Wabash Trail (Sangamon County) =

The Wabash Trail is a 3.0-mile (4.8 km) rail trail in Sangamon County, Illinois. It was built by the Illinois Department of Transportation (IDOT) and occupies an abandoned Wabash Railroad right-of-way on the southwest side of Springfield, Illinois, stretching eastward from Robbins Road to the Wabash Trail Parking on South Park Avenue, linking with the northern terminus of the Interurban Trail. Upkeep and policing of the trail are managed by the Springfield Park District.
