= The Black Sheep Cafe =

Former music venue in Springfield, Illinois, United States

Coordinates: 39.7875°N 89.6410°W

- "BXS", "The Sheep", "Black Sheep"
- Interactive map of The Black Sheep Cafe
- Address: 1320 South 11th Street, Springfield, Illinois, 62703
- Location: Springfield, Illinois
- Owner: Brian Galecki
- Type: Music Venue / Art Space
- Events: Punk rock, Indie rock, Various

Construction
- Opened: September 17, 2005

Website
- blacksheepspringfield.com

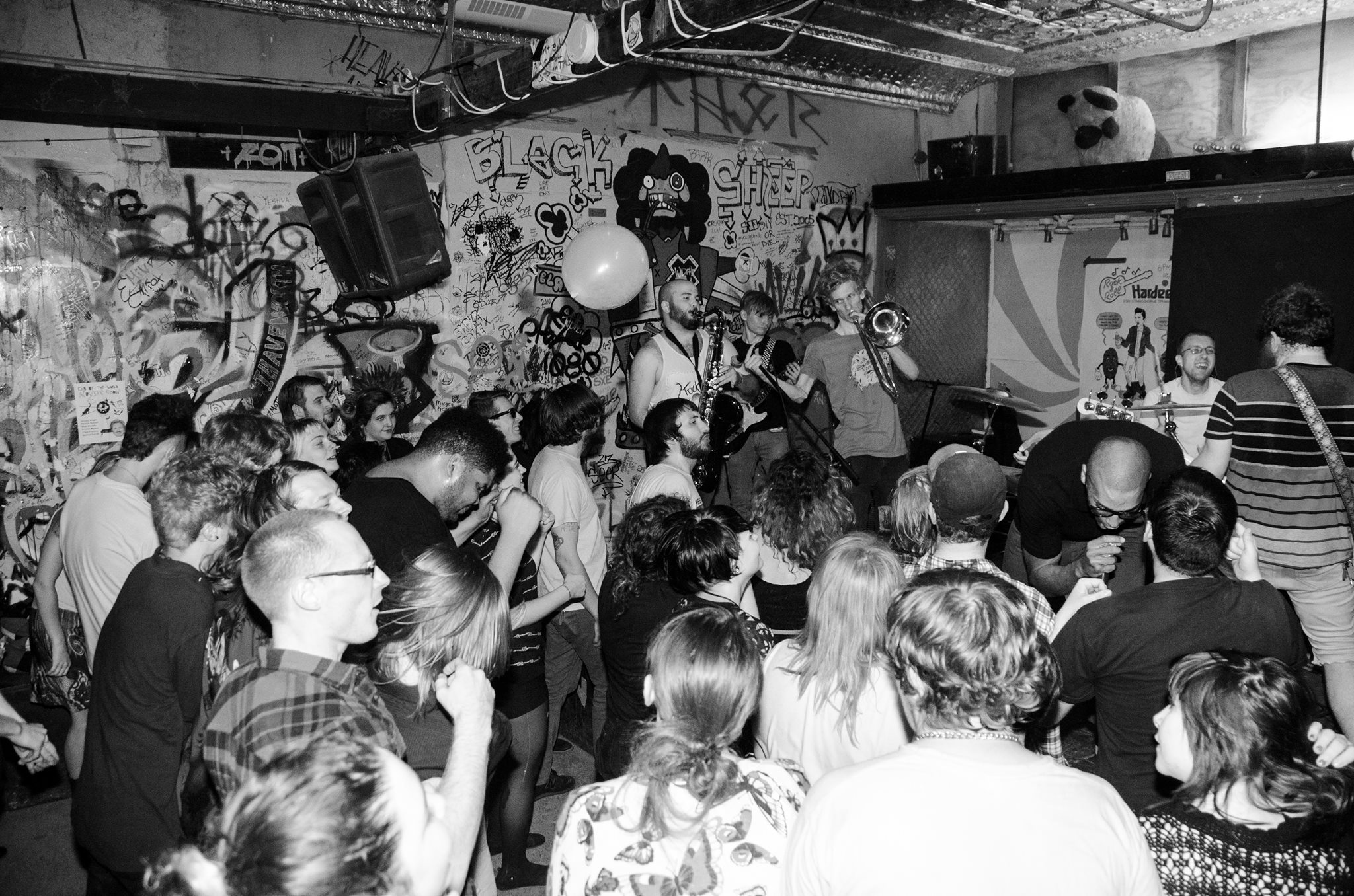
The Black Sheep 10 Year Anniversary Show

The Black Sheep Cafe was an all ages music venue in Springfield, Illinois. The Black Sheep opened for its first shows in September 2005, and since then has become a notable venue in the Springfield, Illinois music scene. The venue was a drug and alcohol free space and was also entirely volunteer-run. The Black Sheep hosted many shows each month, and a few big annual events including Black Sheep Fest and Dumb Fest in the summer. The Black Sheep closed in 2018.

== Founding ==
The Black Sheep Cafe was founded in 2005 under four owners, Roger Smith, Kevin Bradford, Martin Viola, and Crystal Eairheart, in aim of creating an all-ages music space in Springfield. By 2006 the venue had lost all but one of its owners, Kevin Bradford and fell back on "DIY ethics" to keep it afloat. Kevin Bradford remained owner of the venue for the first ten years until announcing his departure in 2015.

== Shows ==
The Black Sheep hosted many shows every month at the venue. The venue was open to shows of all genres including rock, noise, acoustic/indie, hip hop and R&B, most shows however were known for being predominantly hardcore and punk. The venue was also home to a few local music festivals including "Dumb Fest" in June and its namesake festival "Black Sheep Fest" in July. Black Sheep Fest was an annual festival at the venue from 2008 to 2015.

== Expansion ==
The Black Sheep Cafe has caused a number of other related businesses and projects to start in the Southtown neighborhood of Springfield. In late 2013 the Black Sheep announced that it would be teaming up with Error Records in Champaign, Illinois to open up Dumb Records- a new record store in the Southtown neighborhood. Also in December 2013 Brandon Carnes opened up South Town Studio directly behind The Black Sheep. Later on in 2014, Empire Board Shop (a skate shop) moved in above Dumb Records, and later became Boof City Skate Shop. In 2015 the group of businesses making up the Southtown neighborhood launched a new "Project Southtown" to form a new non-for-profit group to focus on neighborhood cleanup and restoration.
