= Carpenter Park =

Park in Springfield, Illinois

- Route 66 in Carpenter Park
- Interactive map of Carpenter Park
- Location: Springfield, Illinois
- Coordinates: 39.8675°N 89.6266°W
- Area: 322 acres (1.30 km^{2})
- Created: 1922; 104 years ago
- Operator: Springfield Park District

Carpenter Park is a 322-acre (1.30 km^{2}) park on the north bank of the Sangamon River on the far north side of the city of Springfield, Illinois. Part of the park is a dedicated Illinois Nature Preserve and has been designated as an Important Bird Area of Illinois. The park, which is operated by the Springfield Park District, is one of the roadside attractions of old Route 66.

== History ==
The woodland that now forms most of Carpenter Park was a wooded intrusion into the tallgrass prairie that covered most of central Illinois during early historic times. The local Indians used the Sangamon River as a transportation route for their canoes and used this woodland, with its plentiful supply of firewood, as a campground.

During the War of 1812, many Indians fought against the frontiersmen of the Illinois Territory, attempting to defend their way of life. While the war as a whole was a draw, the frontiersmen won control of central Illinois Territory and opened it for fur trading and settlement. As an attractive wooded area within the prairie, this parcel of woodland quickly found an occupant. William Carpenter acquired legal control over the land in 1838.

The Carpenter family used the woodland in a manner typical of early 19th century United States frontier culture. William Carpenter established a small ferry across the Sangamon River and built a water-powered mill on the Sangamon River. The mill sawed wood from local timber and ground corn into cornmeal. The ferry was located close to where a bridge was built to enable the U.S. 66 right-of-way to cross the Sangamon River. A replacement bridge stands on a nearby location today.

The Carpenter family continued to occupy the future park property until daughter Sarah Carpenter sold it to the Springfield Park District in 1922 for $87,310. The property was renamed Carpenter Park. Shortly after this accession, in 1926, U.S. Route 66 was designated to include a road, now called Peoria Road, adjacent to the park.

== The park today ==
After being heavily used in the early 19th century, the Carpenter Park woodlands have regained sufficient quality to enable them to be listed as an Illinois Nature Preserve. The woodland is mixed between wet-mesic forest in the Sangamon River floodplain, and dry-mesic upland forest atop a low sandstone bluff.

In the forest preserve, the dry-mesic upland forest, which makes up more than one-half of the land area of the park, is dominated by the white oak, the state tree of Illinois, and its cousins the black oak and bur oak. There are also black walnut, black cherry, and hickory trees. In areas that have not been burned over the past 100 years, pawpaw and sassafras trees are springing up. The aging but high-quality oak-hickory forestland produces a significant quantity of mast to feed whitetail deer and other wildlife. A 443-year-old white oak, believed to be the oldest tree in the park, was fatally injured by a 2009 windstorm.

Closer to the Sangamon River, Carpenter Park's wet-mesic forest supports old growth sycamore, silver maple, cottonwood, and boxelder trees. In the sloping ravines that transition between the two biotic zones, red oak find a foothold.

The woodland is relatively mature and diverse. 82 different species of birds have been sighted. The park was listed as an Illinois Nature Preserve in May 1979. Old U.S. Route 66 runs alongside the park to this day, and the park maintains a picnic ground for those following the historic road through Springfield, Illinois.

In 2007, Carpenter Park was designated as an Important Bird Area of Illinois.

== The park tomorrow ==
The city of Springfield's park district adopted a management plan in 2008 that applies various natural area conservation consensus positions to the park. The plan calls for controlled burns to enable fire-dependent trees, such as bur oaks, to reproduce themselves.

The park district also hopes to construct an improved trail with a railing along the Sangamon River's sandstone bluffs, which are crumbling with erosion.
