= Springfield Park District =

Park district in Springfield, Illinois, United States

Coordinates: 39°46′8.5″N 89°38′2.4″W

The Springfield Park District, established in 1900, is the public park authority serving the metropolitan area of Springfield, Illinois, United States. The Springfield park district, which is separate from the municipal government of the city of Springfield, covers approximately 2,500 acres of open space. The park district has taxing power over about 60 square miles of Sangamon County; it operates 40 facilities that include four public golf courses. Facilities include:

- The park district's flagship open space, Washington Park;
- An Illinois State Natural Area and Important Bird Area of Illinois, Carpenter Park; and
- The Americans with Disabilities Act (ADA)-compliant Southwind Park.

The park district operates 13 miles of bike trails in five units, designated as the Bunn to Lost Bridge Trail, Interurban Trail, Lost Bridge Trail, Sangamon Valley Trail, and Wabash Trail.

The Springfield Park District also operates an independent police department.
