= Hoogland Center for the Arts =

Coordinates: 39.79768°N 89.64754°W

The Hoogland Center for the Arts is a theater complex at 420 South Sixth Street in the central city neighborhood of Springfield, Illinois. It houses three theaters and five smaller performance and exhibit spaces totaling 80,000 square feet (7,400 m^{2}) with an adjacent parking deck.

== History ==
The Hoogland Center building was operated for more than ninety years, from 1909 until 2001, as the temple complex of Springfield Lodge No. 4 of the Ancient Free and Accepted Masons. The original building was constructed in 1909, and a major expansion was added in 1960. Declining local participation in the Masonic order led to the structure changing hands in 2001 when a local developer purchased it for $350,000 and undertook an extensive renovation that gutted the former interior and rebuilt to serve as a home for Springfield nonprofit theater companies, musical performance spaces, and gallery space. Initial estimates for the work were $3.5 million, however unexpected construction problems raised the final cost to $9.1 million. The new Springfield Arts Center opened to the public on December 31, 2003.

In 2004, Family Video CEO Charles Hoogland and his wife Kay made a major donation and, in recognition, the center changed its name. In December 2015, the center made the final payment on its mortgage. As of 2018, the center is home to 19 organizations.
