= Interurban Trail (Sangamon County) =

Rail trail in Sangamon County, Illinois

Coordinates: 39.6721°N 89.7047°W

- Length: 8.3 miles (13.4 km)
- Location: Sangamon County, Illinois
- Website: www.springfieldparks.org/locations/60/interurban-trail/springfield/location-details

The Interurban Trail is a 8.3-mile (13.4 km) rail trail in Sangamon County, Illinois, United States. It was built by the Illinois Department of Transportation (IDOT) and occupies an abandoned Illinois Terminal Railroad interurban corridor. It stretches from the south side of Springfield, to the center of Chatham.

The trail parallels a Class I railroad mainline throughout its entire length. The main line, originally built by the Alton Railroad, is currently operated by Union Pacific Railroad and carries Lincoln Service passenger train service. The trail passes underneath Interstate 72 south of Springfield and crosses the southwestern arm of Lake Springfield, the largest lake in Sangamon County. The arm is where Lick Creek enters the lake.

Springfield is the county's employment center, and the Interurban Trail is available for use by bicycle commuters who live in Sangamon County's southwest townships. It links with the eastern terminus of the Wabash Trail, providing additional access to Springfield's southwest side. The trail is managed by the Illinois Department of Transportation.
