= Lance Brooks =

American discus thrower

Personal information
- Nationality: American
- Born: January 1, 1984 (age 42) New Berlin, Illinois
- Height: 6 ft 6 in (198 cm)
- Weight: 280 lb (127 kg)

Sport
- Sport: Track and Field
- Event: Discus Throw
- Coached by: Steve DeAutremont

Achievements and titles
- Personal best: Discus Throw: 65.15m

Lance Brooks (born January 1, 1984) is an American national champion discus thrower who also competed in the 2012 Summer Olympics.

== Early life ==
Brooks was born January 1, 1984, in New Berlin, Illinois. At birth, he weighed 10 pounds (4.5 kg) and was 22.25 inches (565 mm) long, making him an exceptionally large baby. He first participated in competitive sports during fourth grade, playing basketball at the YMCA. At the time, the school didn't have a track and field team. In eighth grade, his parents successfully petitioned the school board to allow Brooks to be a one-person team. The next year, 50 students joined the team.

Brooks attended New Berlin High School, where he played baseball and basketball. He participated in several track and field events, excelling at discus. He won the event at almost every meet and was the state discus champion his senior year. Throughout his school years, Brooks was very active in Boy Scouts, achieving the rank of Eagle Scout.

After graduation, Brooks attended Millikin University, earning a Bachelor of Science in Environmental Science in 2006. During college, he played basketball and did track and field. He set a school record in discus (57.83 m (189 ft 9 in) but did not consider seriously competing in the sport. Brooks was an NCAA Division III All-American during his stay at Millikin.

== Athletic career ==
After college, Brooks moved to Boulder, Colorado to train and teach track and field at the high school level. He went to graduate school at University of Colorado for one semester. He qualified for the 2008 Olympic Trials, but did not make the team.

In 2009, Brooks finished fourth in discus at the US Outdoor Championships, narrowly missing qualifying for World's. In 2010, he set a new personal best, throwing 64.79 meters, and finished the year ranked number 24 in the world. At the 2011, National Outdoor Championships, Brooks placed third in the discus with a score of 63.45 metres (208.2 ft). The score, which he achieve on his final throw, was good enough to qualify him for 2011 World Championships. At the World's, he finished 13th. For the year, he was ranked number 38 in the world at the discus.

At the 2012 Olympic Trials, led all six rounds of the competition throwing over 64 metres (210 ft) of each of his first three throws. However, he had not met the "A" Standard required to make the Olympic team in any previous event, and thus was in danger of winning the event but failing to qualify for the Olympics. On his final throw, he achieved a distance of 65.15 metres (213.7 ft), winning the event with a new personal best and meeting the required standard of 65 meters. On his last throw, Brooks remarked: "I knew I had to calm down on my last throw. I just kind of took a minute and relaxed and tried not to tense up because that's what ruined my fourth and fifth throws [on which he fouled]. I knew I could throw it, it was just a matter of getting through it." The entire competition was held in the rain, inhibiting the competitor's throwing ability.

At the Olympics, Brooks threw the discus 61.17 metres (200.7 ft) on his first attempt. His next two throws were slightly shorter, leaving Brooks in 21st place among 42 competitors after the three qualification round throws. Since only the top twelve advance to the finals, Brooks competition was over. His coach, Steve DeAutremont, said Brooks' technique was slightly off: "I think he was a little rushed out of the back [of the throwing ring]. He finish wasn’t quite as smooth. All those little things can add up." Brooks agreed and said "I'm somewhat happy with how I did".

Brooks is coached by Steve DeAutremont and sponsored by Nike. Lance Brooks also volunteers his coaching to High School Athletes. He recently gave an exhibition training event at the High School track meet in Grand Junction Colorado after coaching a promising Ridgway High School thrower.

== Personal life ==
Brooks currently lives in Denver, Colorado he was a throws coach at Cherry Creek High School for 2 seasons (shot put and discus. After making the 2012 Olympic team he returned to his job in construction pouring concrete. "It's probably not the ideal job to have as an athlete", he told a reporter, "but it pays the bills and you've got to do what you've got to do." Lance still actively searches for his ideal career in the Energy and Oil and Gas industries hoping to one day find that steady income and career.
