= 1908 Springfield race riot =

Conflict in Springfield, Illinois, U.S.

- Part of the nadir of American race relations
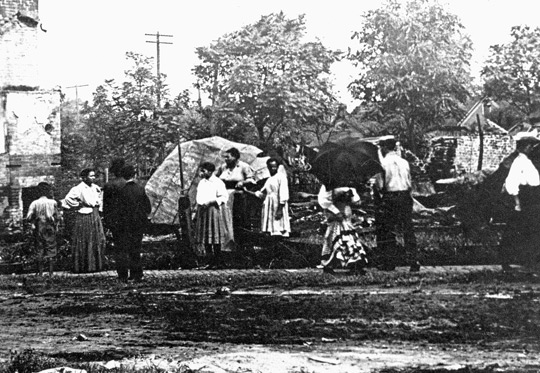
- Burned black residences in "The Badlands"
- Location: 39°48′17″N 89°38′31″W; Springfield, Illinois, US
- Date: August 14–16, 1908
- Target: Black residents
- Attack type: Arson, assault, battery, lynching, rioting, mayhem, slashing, vandalism
- Weapons: Brickbats; Clothesline; Clubs; Guns; Razor; Torches
- Deaths: 17
- Assailant: White mob
- No. of participants: c. 5,000 whites
- Motive: False accusation, racial hoax, racial persecution, vigilantism, white supremacy
- Charges: 117 indictments (total reported); 150+ indictments (total accounted)
- Convictions: 1

The Springfield race riot of 1908 consisted of events of mass racial violence committed against African Americans by a mob of about 5,000 white Americans and European immigrants in Springfield, Illinois, between August 14 and 16, 1908. Two black men, Joe James and George Richardson, had been arrested. James was accused of murdering a white man and attempting to rape his daughter, and Richardson was accused of raping a white woman, Mabel Hallam. When the sheriff had transferred the two suspects out of the city, white people began attacking black neighborhoods, killing black citizens, and destroyed black businesses and homes. The state militia was called out to quell the rioting.

At least 17 people died, including two who died by suicide. It was misreported for decades that only militia were responsible for white deaths and that more whites than black people had died. Personal and property damages, suffered overwhelmingly by black people, amounted to more than $150,000 (approximately $5 million in 2024), as dozens of black homes and businesses were destroyed, as well as three white-owned businesses.

As a result of the rioting, numerous black people left Springfield, but it is unclear how many moved away permanently. Although in the following months over 100 riot-related indictments were issued and some pleaded guilty to minor violations, only one alleged rioter went to trial and was convicted for lesser offenses. Of the two accused black men, who were the initial focus of the lynch mob, James was eventually tried, convicted, and hanged; Richardson was set free. Hallam admitted that she had lied to cover up an assault by her husband after he found out she was having an affair.

The riot was a catalyst for the formation of the National Association for the Advancement of Colored People (NAACP), which was organized to work on civil rights for African Americans. Near the 100th anniversary in 2008, the City of Springfield erected historical markers and a memorial statue. Part of the site of the riots was established as the Springfield 1908 Race Riot National Monument in 2024.

== Background ==
In 1908, Springfield was a transportation hub, connected by railroad to other major cities such as Indianapolis, Louisville, and Kansas City, etc. Illinois is often considered a microcosm of the U.S. and Springfield, with about 45,000 people at the time, most of whom were working class, was described as an "average American community".

=== Economy ===
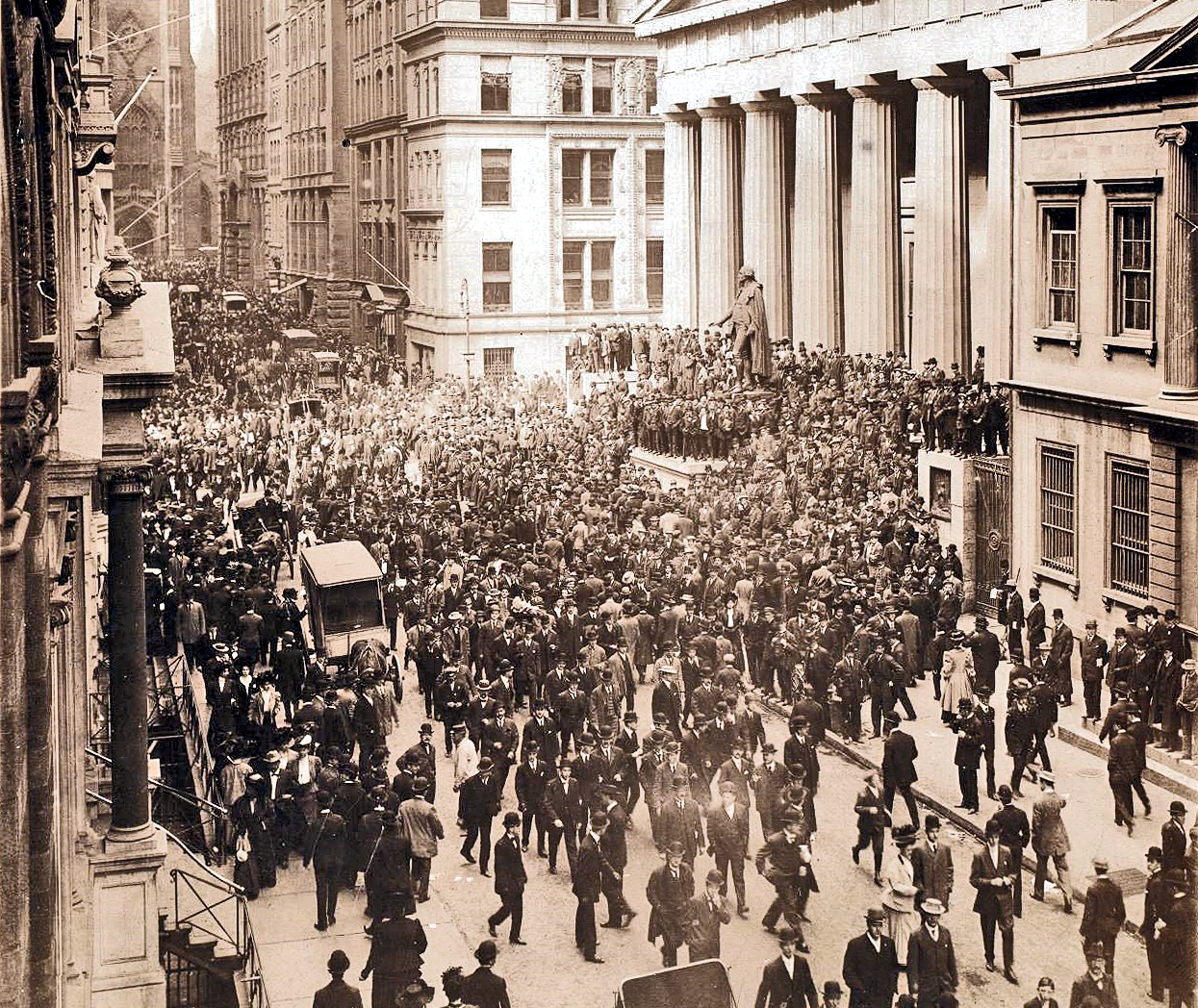
Wall Street during bank panic, Oct. 1907

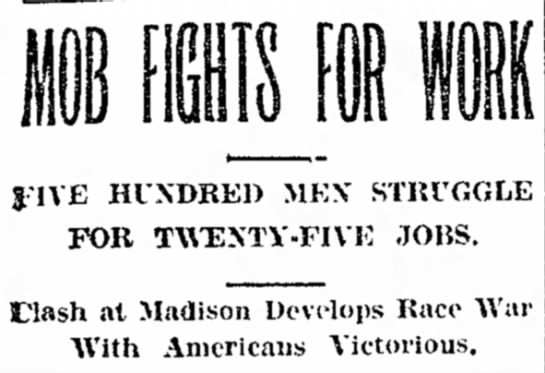
Edwardsville Intelligencer, March 1908

In July 1908, the US was pulling itself out of the Panic of 1907, which occurred during a lengthy economic contraction between May 1907 and June 1908. This contraction led to suspension of cash payments by banks, a halt in lending, and a fall in the stock market, all resulting in significant economic disruption. Industrial production dropped, and the period saw the second-highest volume of bankruptcies to that date, with the dollar volume increasing nearly 50 percent. Production fell over 10 percent, commodity prices dropped by more than 20 percent, imports fell by over 25 percent, and unemployment, which had been less than 3 percent prior to the panic, increased to 8 percent, resulting in fierce job competition. As of April 1908, there were 200,000 unemployed men in Illinois, with 55 percent of those residing outside of Chicago. Comparatively, neighboring Iowa and Missouri, which had populations that were 40 percent and 60 percent of Illinois' (5.5 million), had 2,000 and 43,000 unemployed men, respectively.

Due to its dependence on mines, railroad, and vice industries, such as saloons, Springfield was largely insulated from much of the contraction. However, the city still could not escape the economic downturn of the region, including new alcohol policies passed in 1908 that suddenly put the employees at nearly 2,000 bars across the state out of work, including 20 percent of the saloons across Sangamon County.

There was growing unrest among railroad workers after the Illinois Central Railroad began a "retrenchment" (cost-cutting) policy in December 1907. For example, men in nearby Clinton saw their work week drop from seven to four days a week by March 1908. That same month, the railroad also began streamlining positions to further cut expenses, which caused many to be "bumped down" to lower jobs, affecting younger workers.

There was also uncertainty among Springfield's miners at the local and national level. In November 1907, 4,000 miners in Danville went on strike when coal operators stopped paying workers in cash and began issuing checks. Five months later, on April 1, 1908, Springfield's miners were nearly part of the 250,000 miners across the country who went on strike after their contracts expired and coal operators showed "no inclination" to make new contracts with the union. Illinois' 60,000 miners subsequently "declared war" against coal operators. The unrest led to the shut down of Illinois' mines for a month, which had a significant negative impact on the freight business for the railroads as coal cars sat idle during that time. The lack of coal movement also impacted road workers, who could not pave the roads without the coal. In early May, while over 35,000 of Illinois' miners voted to return to work, miners in two districts voted to move forward with the strike – Peoria and Springfield. Around the same time, miners in neighboring Decatur voted to go on strike and, on June 8, 1908, roughly 500 miners called off two separate strikes, at the Pawnee and Pana mines, over work conditions.

=== Immigrants and race ===
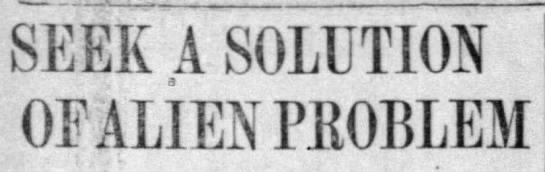
Chicago Tribune. 1907.

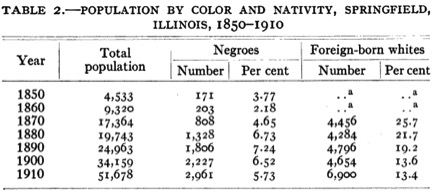
Springfield Immigrant & Black Population. 1850–1910.

At the turn of the century, Springfield's population was about 35,000 people and growing. In 1900, the immigrant population, which prior to 1890 had only grown at a rate of 0.15 percent per year and remained stagnant at roughly 4,500, began to grow at a rate of 4 percent per year.

According to the United States Census Bureau, in 1908, nearly 35 percent of these immigrants were unable to speak English, and nearly 15 percent were illiterate. This created tension between white immigrants and white Americans, who feared their growing political presence. White Americans were increasingly more negative, fearful, and xenophobic toward the immigrants, who they deemed to be biologically inferior, culturally and religiously odd, and generally substandard with a proclivity to filth, laziness and violence. Within the country's racial hierarchy, European immigrants were perched below whites, but above black people, fending off degrading ethnic slurs such as "Hunky" (Hungarians), "Guinea" (Italians), and "Polack" (Polish).

Such attitudes presented new immigrants with a choice — fight to become socially "white" or align with politically and economically disadvantaged black people. In an atmosphere where immigrants heard statements like "One white man is as good as two or three Italians", and where whites were bringing lawsuits against their own family members who they suspected of having "tainted" black blood, immigrants opted to strive to become "white":

In a country where the distinction between white man and black is intended as a distinction of value as well as ethnography it is no compliment to the Italian to deny him his whiteness...

— Robert F. Foerster, Economist, 1919

The pressure to become "white" led to many immigrants seeking ways to "prove" their whiteness. Protecting and expanding the notion of white supremacy was deemed convincing evidence.

At the time, black people were expected to be subservient, agreeable and deferential to whites or be subject to verbal abuse, threats or physical violence. Whites who viewed black people as being "uppity" would often impose quick and harsh retribution against them. As immigrants observed how white Americans treated black people, they began not only mimicking such treatment, but also distancing themselves from black people geographically and socially. For example, in the particularly distressed economy of 1908, many European immigrants opted for unemployment over taking jobs that perpetuated stereotypes of them, or taking "nigger jobs" that would associate them with black people.

In Springfield, such attitudes were inflamed by white Americans who had immigrated from Kentucky (across the Ohio River), from the border area of southern Illinois, and also from other areas across the south, seeking work in the mines and railroads. These southern immigrants brought the heightened racial animus with them that was associated with the segregated racial culture of the region.

=== Springfield racial dynamics ===
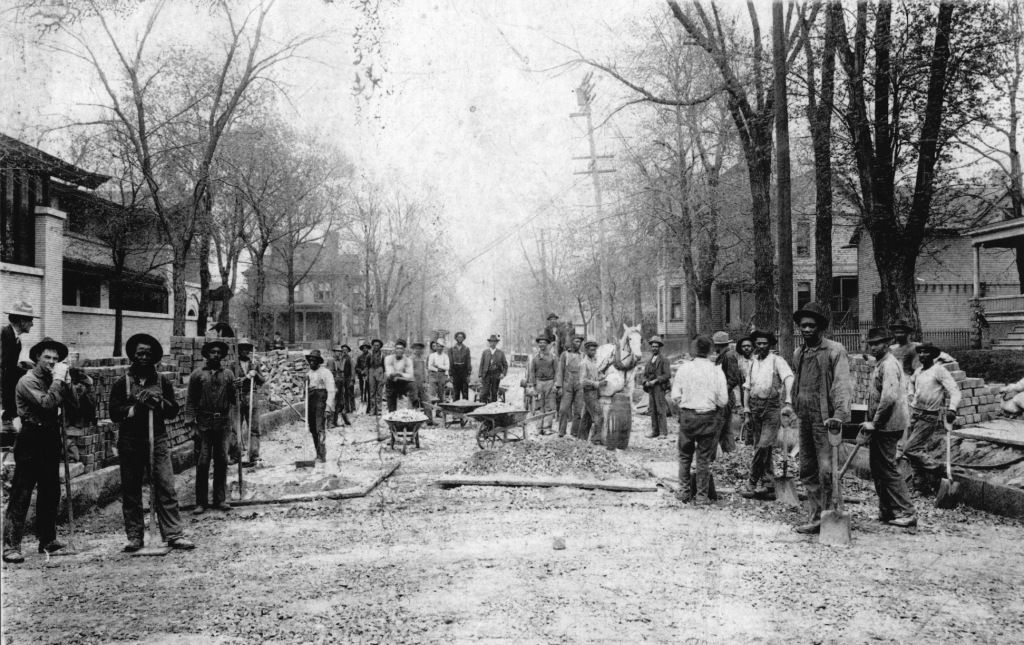
Sangamon County Road pavement crew. c. 1905

Following the Civil War, black people began migrating north for work and also in search of areas less socially oppressive than the south. In the post-Reconstruction years of the late 19th century, Springfield, as a rapidly growing industrial center, was one of those places black people sought refuge and prosperity, with the city's black population growing by 4 percent per year. By the turn of the century, there were nearly 2,500 black people in the city, representing about 7 percent of the population, which was about 35,000.

The same level of growth had not been true for Springfield's European immigrant population in this period. The annual growth rate of the immigrant population was 0.15 percent, not growing beyond roughly 4,500 people.

Around 1890, the migration of black people to Springfield began to slow. In the early 20th century, black people from the rural South began the Great Migration, and many began moving to larger cities, such as New York and Chicago. Between 1900 and 1908, the annual black migration rate in Springfield decreased from 4 percent to 3 percent. Meanwhile, for European immigrants, the trend was the reverse.

By July 1908, Springfield's population was over 45,000 (of which about 40 percent were under the age of 21). Of those 45,000, nearly 6,500 were European immigrants, who together with their first generation American offspring accounted for 40 percent of Springfield's population, while native white Americans made up just under 55 percent and black people about 6 percent. These population shifts had economic, political and social implications, particularly as the unemployment rate increased from under 3 percent to 8 percent between May 1907 and June 1908, during the Panic.

In 1908, there were slightly more than 1,000 black men in Springfield's workforce. About 50 percent were porters and laborers; only 150 were employed as miners. Most of the rest were restricted to lower-class and unskilled jobs (for example, there were no white janitors in the city), but some worked for the city as firemen and policemen.

Social tensions rose due to the swelling immigrant population, the decrease in job stability, and the movement of a few upper middle class black people into white neighborhoods. Resentment among white immigrants ran high against black people. Whites resented upward mobility among black people as a threat to a social order in which they should always be superior, and white business owners often exploited this resentment for their own economic benefit. For example, some industries used black workers as strikebreakers during labor strikes, pitting black people and immigrants against each other in an effort to prevent unionization. Stories of black strikebreakers were carried by numerous newspapers in Illinois. The disproportionate coverage of these instances fueled white antagonism against the black workers. Springfield's immigrants were anxious about competing with the city's black minority, and the city's native whites worried about growing political power among the city's black people.

=== Black men as "menaces" ===
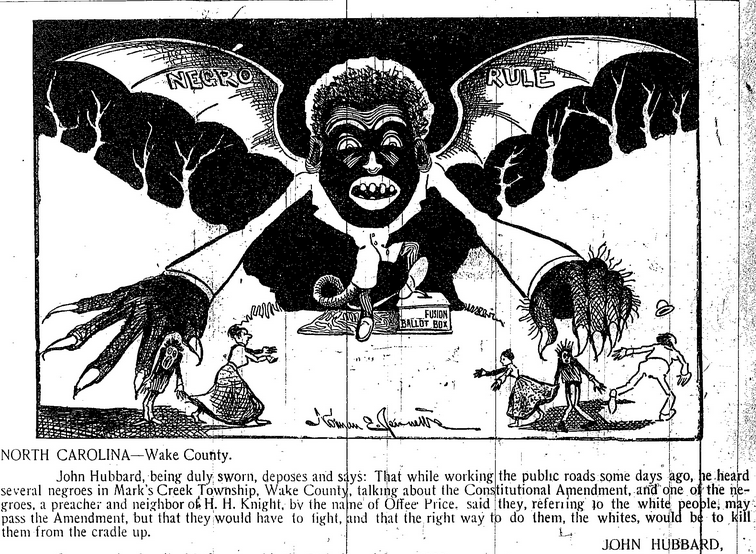
"Negro Rule." News & Observer. 1898

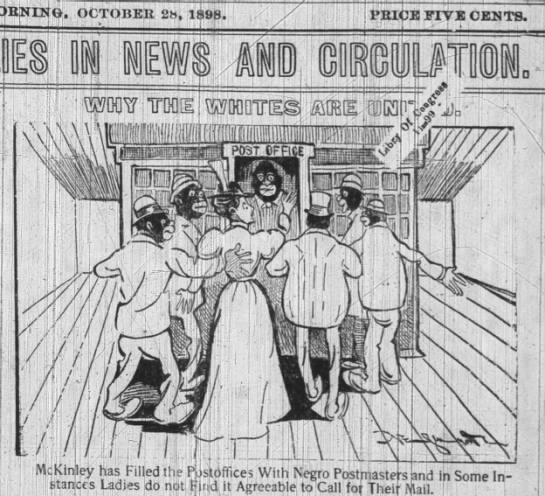
News & Observer. 1898

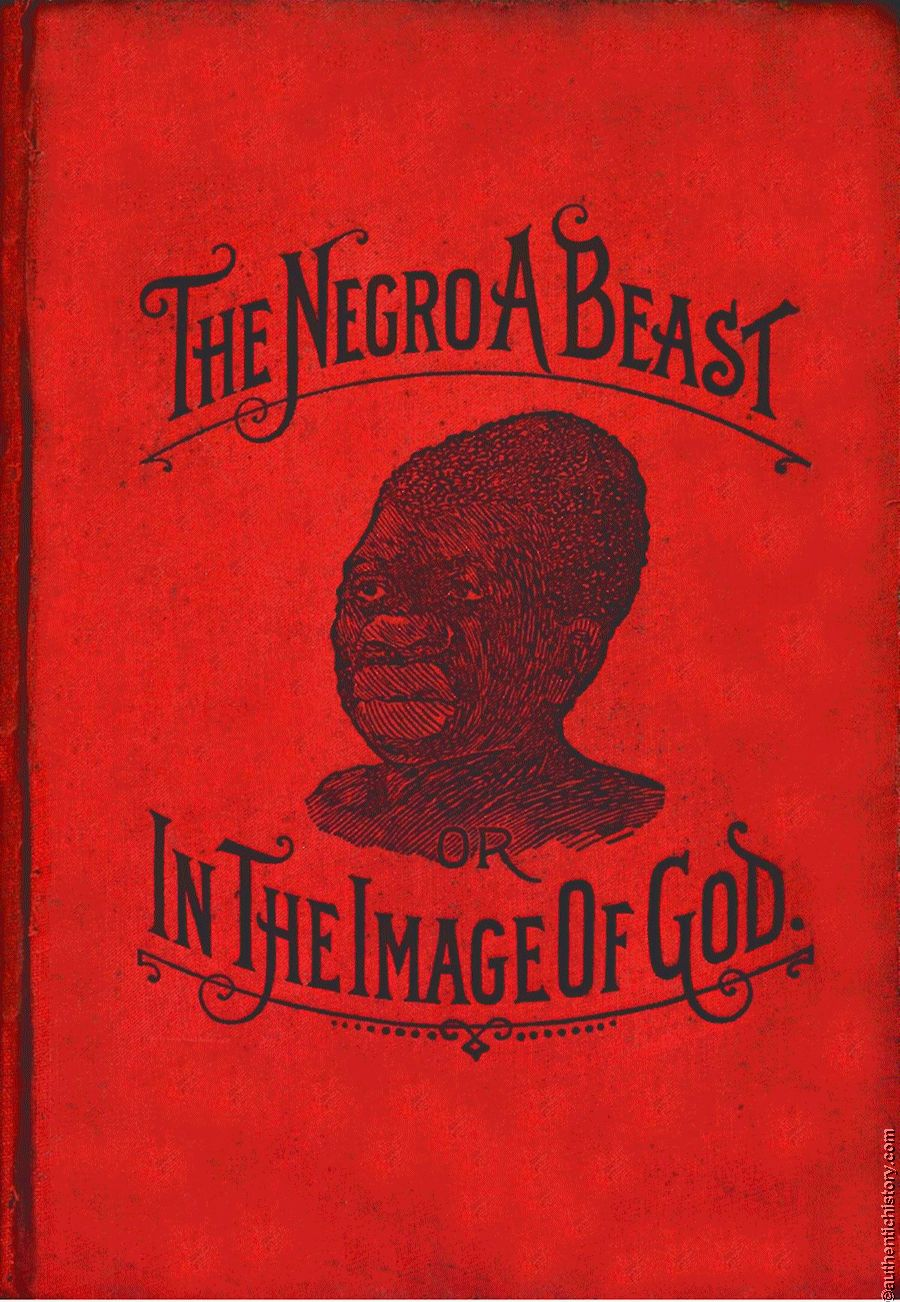
"The Negro a Beast," by Charles Carroll. 1900.

Prior to the Civil War there had been some degree of tolerance for sexual relationships between black men and white women. However, after the war, keeping the races separate became essential in maintaining the racial hierarchy of white supremacy, because black men gained suffrage after the War, granting them political power to be social and economic competitors with white men. During Reconstruction, black male sexuality became a battle cry of Southern politicians decrying "negro domination", warning of the perils of racial equality.

The idea of manhood was synonymous with the rights and responsibilities of U.S. citizenship. Whites began framing black manhood with sexual connotations, conflating the political and economic agency of black men with sexual agency (framed as "aggressive" and "transgressive"), from which whites, particularly white women, needed to be protected. Politics and black manhood became increasingly intertwined, even being debated on the floor of the United States Congress. In the lead up to the passage of the Ku Klux Klan Act in 1872, whites who testified before Congress exhibited "extreme anxiety" about sexual relations between black men and white women, with testimony linking to fears of black men's political and economic independence. Rape of white women, it was argued, was the natural proclivity of black men without slavery to restrain them; free black men were commonly equated to unchained animals ("black brutes") who lacked human intelligence and could, therefore, not be entrusted with the right to vote. Conversely, black women, who were routinely raped by white men, resulting in a population of over 1 million mulattos, were deemed as lacking sexual morals, casting the entire race as void of morality and intelligence, so that they should not be allowed to vote. Frederick Douglass noted the political link of black men being accused of rape: "It is only since the Negro has become a citizen and a voter that this charge has been made." "[This] charge was made to blast and ruin the Negro's character as a man and as a citizen." Vigilantism and lynching were deemed necessary evils to protect whites – politically, socially and economically – from the "lawlessness" of black people. During such attacks, black men were ritually castrated as an act of further emasculation, making them "examples" of the fate of black man who dared to "step out of their place". Simply being accused of any offense against whites, regardless of evidence or the motives of the accuser, would result in the conviction, or lynching, of black people.

White women, as social and economic beneficiaries of a white-dominant racial hierarchy, were not only purveyors of this treatment of black people, but in many cases, actively sought such treatment against black people. Such notions commenced an era of terrorism and lynching of black men.

In the 43 years from the end of the Civil War until the attacks in Springfield, instances of labeling black men as some variation of "brute", "menace", "beast", "nigger", "rapist", "fiend", or otherwise "inferior" had been printed in newspapers across the country over 200,000 times, approximately 13 instances per day. In the 12 months before the events began in Springfield, such labeling appeared in newspapers across Illinois over 500 times, more than once per day. The frequency of black men being labeled in such negative terms accentuated the perception among whites of their very presence as a threat, a perception in which blackness, vice, and crime were conflated.

In 1907, the year before the attacks in Springfield, this perceived threat was addressed on the floor of the U.S. Senate when Senator Ben Tillman delivered a rousing speech advocating the economic and political protection of white men from black men by nullifying the 14th Amendment, and the social protection of white women from black men by means of lynching.

==== The "menace" in Springfield ====
1908 was an election year in Springfield. The city had been plagued with rampant political corruption, for 20 years, when Indiana's "Blocks of Five" voting system was introduced to the community, enabling a vice ring to dominate local affairs. White politicians, looking to secure votes, began "buying" votes from black men in exchange for legal immunity, allowing vice in the black saloon district to thrive. The politicians also "bought" votes in the white saloon districts, but negative labeling of black men had framed their corruption as being "more" harmful, "more" dangerous, and "more" lawless than the same corruption from whites, despite black people owning less than 3 percent of the city's saloons. Any offense, committed by black people, was deemed "the fault" of black corruption, black saloons, black suffrage, and black upward mobility.

It was noted that "the Negro of Springfield is not the Negro of the South," in that a black man in Springfield had an "aggressive attitude," which he would use to readily argue that he was "just as good as a white man." Corrupt white politicians were said to have contributed to this "arrogant attitude" by giving them city jobs, despite "the majority being lazy, dishonest, vicious, worthless, and genuinely bad." It was reportedly this "attitude" that created a strong dislike against them in among Springfield's white citizens, on par with the dislike of black people in the South.

=== "Wet" city ===
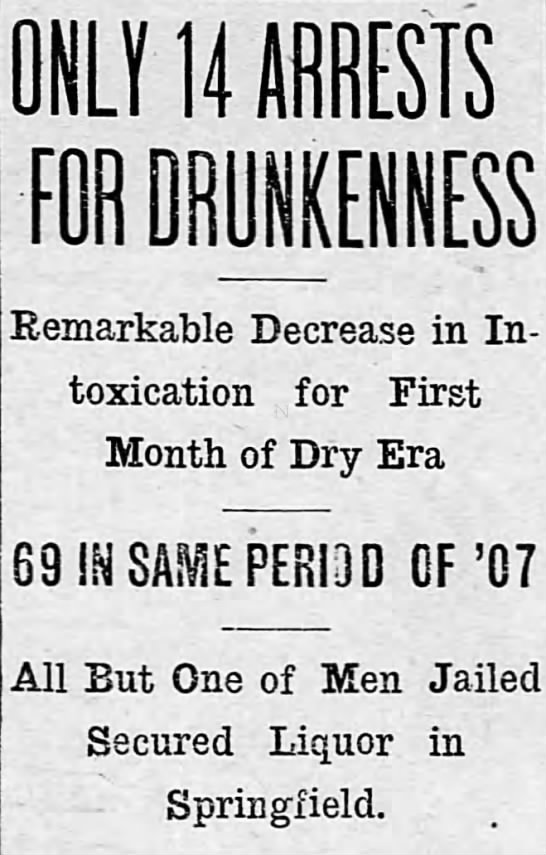
Decatur Herald. 8 Jun 1908.

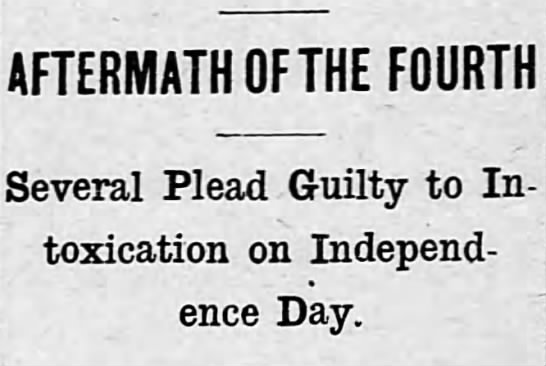
Decatur Herald. 6 Jul 1908.

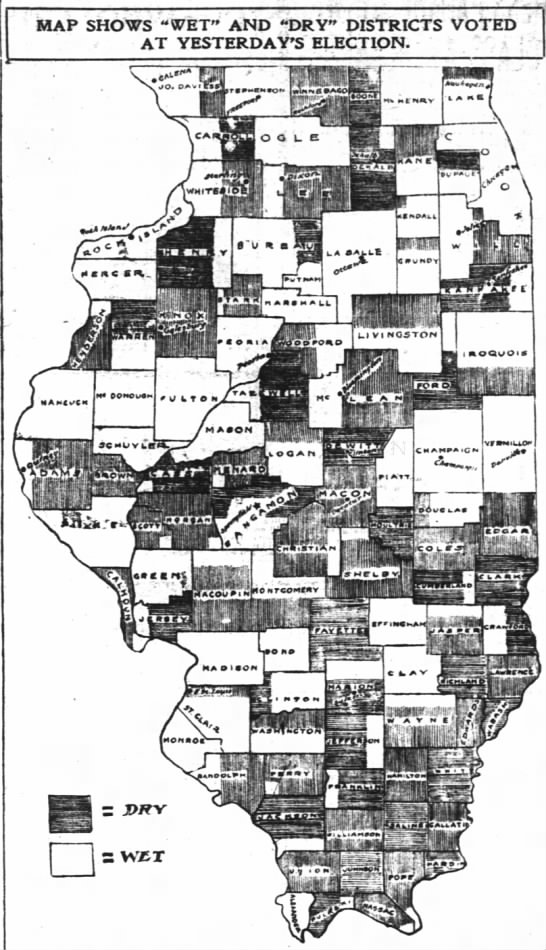
Wet-Dry Map. 8 Apr 1908

Prohibition represented a conflict between urban and rural values emerging in the United States. With the rising population of immigrants in urban centers, more immigrants began frequenting saloons. This spawned the notion that saloons were breeding grounds for moral and political corruption, due to the perception that immigrants traded their votes for favors i.e. jobs, housing, food, etc.

In a backlash to the changing demographics, many prohibitionists embraced nativism, fostering further resentment toward immigrants who, typically due to cultural differences about drinking, were against prohibition.

After a highly contentious debate on prohibition, in 1907, the Illinois General Assembly approved the "local option" law, which allowed local residents to decide whether their towns would be "wet" (allowing liquor sales within the boundaries of individual counties and townships), or to otherwise be "dry."

In April 1908, after a Sangamon County vote, only two of the county's 27 townships opted to be "wet" – New Berlin, which was the home of four saloons, and Capital Township, which included Springfield and accounted for over 80 percent of the county's nearly 250 saloons. At the time of the vote, approximately $2.2 million (over $55 million in 2018) was spent on alcohol in Springfield's more than 200 saloons, six of which were black-owned, generating tax revenue that accounted for one-third of the city's $300,000 (about $7.5 million in 2018) annual budget.

While there were nearly 18,000 [all male] ballots cast in that county vote, the overall sentiment of the county becoming "dry" was favored by just two fewer votes than those who favored it remaining "wet." This caused the Springfield mayor, Roy Reece, a politician known to curry political favors through vice, to implement a minimal regulation to keep voters, on either side of the issue, happy, by prohibiting any saloon to operate between 12:00 a.m. and 5:00 a.m.

Despite this, Springfield remained a hotbed for drinking, as the saloons serviced both local residents, and also became a destination for visitors – including many who were unemployed or underemployed – from neighboring "dry" townships and counties. For example, between May and June 1907, neighboring Decatur had nearly 70 arrests for drunkenness. However, one year later, after Decatur had become "dry," it had 80 percent fewer drinking arrests, and every man who had been arrested for drunkenness had obtained his liquor in Springfield.

The drinking culture of Springfield fed into the pending attacks in two ways. First, though Springfield was somewhat sheltered from the sluggish economy, the Panic did leave more men unemployed or underemployed. Second, many of these men would frequent the saloons, where they would drink daily, binge drink, and abuse alcohol due to mental strain, financial pressure, shame and a feeling of helplessness that they were unable to protect, and provide, for their families. Socially, unemployed white men felt aggrieved against black men who either had jobs or owned property and, otherwise, lived well.

"Drunkenness" arrests were particularly high on the Fourth of July, a fact that would later play into the ensuing attacks. For example, in 1907, in Decatur, there were over 200 arrests for drunkenness on Fourth of July. The holiday resulted in so many issues that The Inter Ocean newspaper, of Chicago, published an "Annual List of Injured, Arrest and Fires Resulting From Celebration of Fourth of July."

== Inciting crimes ==
=== Murder of Clergy Ballard ===
On Saturday, July 5, 1908, at approximately 12:45 a.m., shortly after the saloons closed for the night, an intruder allegedly entered the home of a 45-year-old white hoisting engineer at a mine, Clergy "Posey" Ballard, located at 1135 North Ninth Street. Ballard was a long-time resident, and one of the "best beloved men" of the North End – a primarily white, mixed-income neighborhood. He had worked on the Chicago, Peoria and St. Louis railroad for 16 years, has been employed at the Jones & Allen mine for the last two years, and was well-liked among the mining community.

==== Home invasion ====
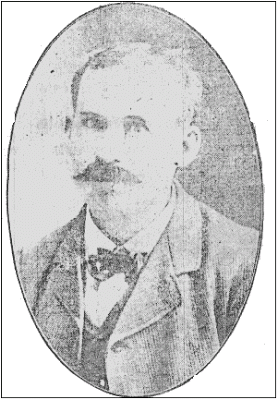
Clergy Ballard. c. 1900.

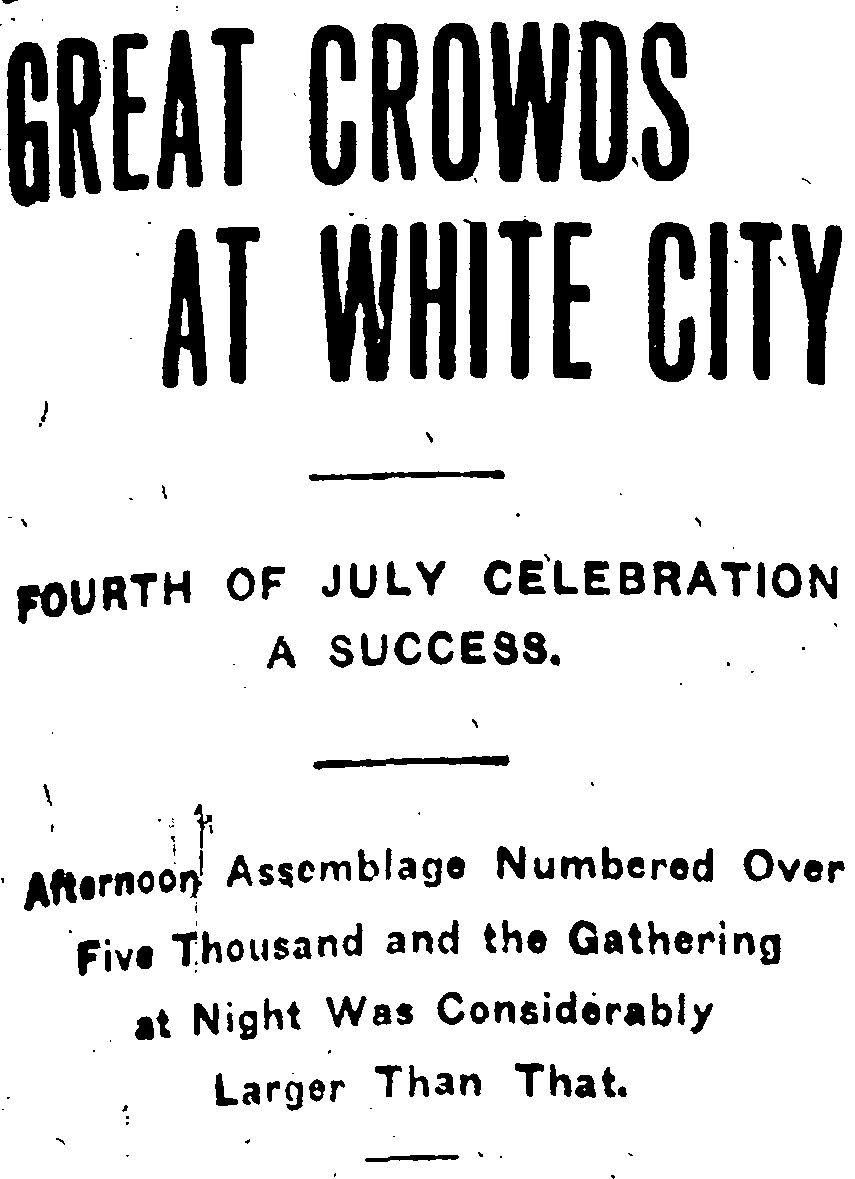
Illinois State Register

That evening, Ballard's 16-year-old daughter, Blanche, spent the Fourth of July celebrating at the White City Amusement Park, along the eastern suburbs of Springfield, with some friends and neighbors. The event had attracted 5,000 people during the day, and the night attendance was "more than double that number."

Blanche returned home shortly after midnight. Blanche alleged to have just fallen asleep (though it would also be reported that she awoke from "a heavy sleep"), in her east-facing front bedroom, when she was awakened by the presence of "a strange form" lying at the foot of her bed, a bed that she also shared with her 10-year-old sister, Marie. Blanche alleged that she stretched her hand out and touched the "form" in bed with her, thinking it was her 22-year-old brother, Charles, arriving home after her and seeking "repose" in her bed rather than his own. She asked, "Is that you, Charlie?" When she received no answer, she asked if it was Charles again, then grabbed the "form's" hand and felt "hard substances" in it. Allegedly frightened, she recoiled, and "the form jumped away, mumbled something and ran into the parlor," on the north side of the house, where he proceeded to go from room to room. Blanche allegedly called out to her 43-year-old mother, Gertrude (who went by her middle name "Emma"), which was said to have awakened her father.

Ballard went to Blanche's room and, "perceiving a negro in the house," tried to approach the man. However, "before Ballard could close in on the man," the man fled. Ballard had seen nothing "but a fleeing glimpse" of the intruder, who reportedly ran, back through the girl's bedroom, and out the front door, "going around the south side of the house, toward the rear."

In his undergarments, and "not knowing exactly which way the intruder had gone," Ballard reportedly went outside to his front porch (it would later be reported he exited to his back porch), where he allegedly "encountered a negro who was coming around the house." As the men neared the rear of the home, Ballard was then, reportedly, "attacked without hesitation," by the assailant with either a "knife or a razor."

==== Fight with attacker ====
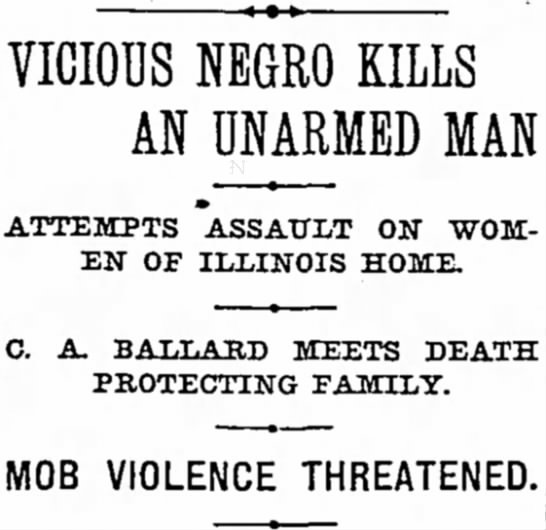
Courier-Journal

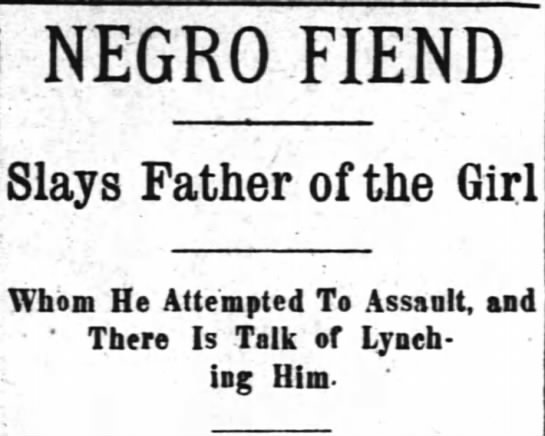
The Cincinnati Enquirer

Ballard reportedly fought with the attacker around the house, up onto the porch, out into his yard, and "across those [yards] of his neighbors for a distance of fully 100 feet." It was unknown how the fight transpired, but Ballard was reportedly "cut to ribbons" with a sharp weapon, presumed to have been a razor:

[They] kept fighting until they got to the fourth house from our house. Then the man let go of my father and ran away.

— Blanche Ballard

Exactly what happened in the yard, no one knows save Ballard and the negro.

— Illinois State Journal

Eleven different wounds were found on the body of the murdered man. The one which appeared to be fatal was in the chest and looked like a knife thrust. It punctured the lung. Below and leading from it, to the left was a long, curved slash which was not very deep. Across both arms, just below the elbows were deep cuts severing muscles to bones. A slash across six inches long extended across the neck. There was a gash across the top of the head, one across the neck, one in front, and one behind the right ear, and a number of smaller cuts on the face, chest and arms.

— Illinois State Register

After he was cut, Ballard allegedly "staggered back to the porch." Reportedly, Emma had been "a terror-stricken witness from the porch, and did not realize the severity of Ballard's wounds until he, weak from loss of blood, fell to the ground."

Ballard would be labeled a hero who "undoubtedly prevented an outrage [rape]" against his daughter.

==== Search for attacker ====
The commotion failed to catch the attention of Ballard's firemen sons, Charles and, 24-year-old, Homer, who were also in the unlocked house, until Emma and Blanche allegedly called out to them. Homer and Charles ran outside, reportedly in their undergarments, and "gave chase" to the attack, who had allegedly crossed the street and turned north, "toward the watch factory."

Rather than continue to chase the attacker, Charles and Homer retreated back home, reportedly to help with their father. As they were helping Ballard off the ground, Ballard allegedly raised his head and pointed to a man standing in the "space between the two houses on the east side of Ninth Street." Ballard reportedly told his sons, "There's the negro now. For God's sakes, get him boys, for he's killed me."

Charles and Homer left their father again, and the two chased the man, who ran "northward." Some of Ballard's neighbors, who had been alerted by Emma's calls, reportedly joined in the pursuit. The attacker, who had allegedly entered the Ballard home through the unlocked front door, reportedly outran those chasing him, with his speed noted as being "fleet of foot." Though some newspapers would report that the attacker outran the posse because he had "too much of a [head] start."

The attacker reportedly ran north on Ninth Street (Homer Ballard would later state that he chased the assailant "north on Grand Street") and "disappeared in the grounds of the Illinois watch factory." However, other reports claimed that the attacker was seen "crashing into a tree" on the watch factory premises, but "staggered and continued on" until he disappeared among factory park trees.

Ballard's family then brought him inside their home and tried to help him, but could not "stanch the gust of blood." Ballard could not talk much, as he had lost a lot of blood. Police Chief Wilbur F. Morris was awakened at 2:00 a.m. and alerted. He placed every officer in town on alert, assigning patrols along the east and northeast sections of the city.

==== Another stabbing nearby ====
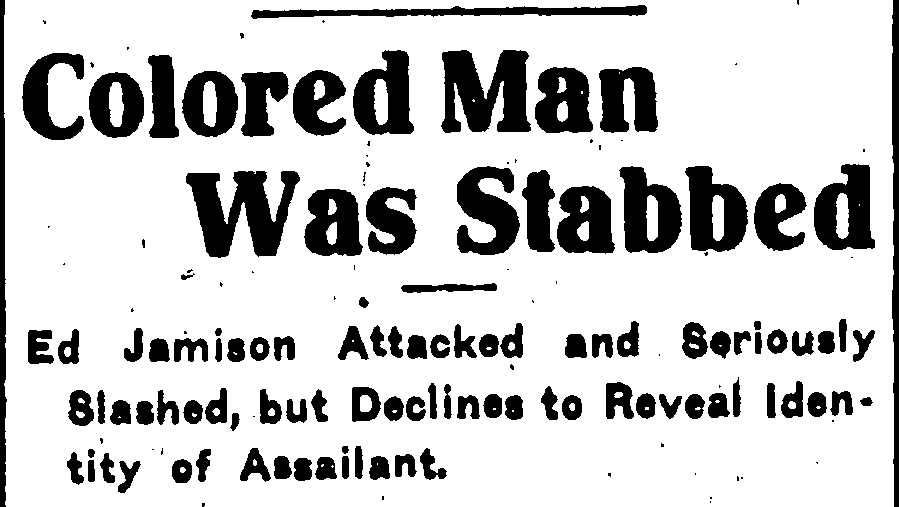
Illinois State Register

Around twenty minutes later, close to 1:00 a.m., a 30-year-old mulatto, Ed Jamison, was robbed and stabbed near his residence, on Reynolds and Ninth streets, about six blocks south of the Ballard home. The only thing the robber reportedly took from Jamison was his coat.

Jamison was "severely stabbed" in the right shoulder, over the collar bone, and also across his left breast, splitting down his right arm from his shoulder to his wrist. He was taken to St. John's hospital, where he was interviewed about his attacker. He claimed that he was walking along on Reynolds street, having just crossed Ninth, when he was suddenly attacked by a black man that "rapidly" approached him, grabbed him by the coat, and demanded to Jamison, "Give me your coat." When Jamison refused and tried to step away, the attacker allegedly began "slashing him with some sharp instrument." Jamison reportedly fell, and his attacker, whom he described as "a light colored negro with a slight mustache," ran away.

Jamison sustained one cut along "his head, another across his back, and still another down his left forearm." He ran home, where he fainted, and was then taken to St. John's Hospital, where he was interviewed by police about the attack. The police believed Jamison knew his attacker, but refused to name him.

Early July 5, after the police learned of Jamison's attack, they made a "strenuous effort" to find Jamison's attacker, "believing that he might be the same negro that cut Ballard." However, the following day, July 6, the police dismissed Jamison's attack, stating that it had "positively no connection" with Ballard's attack, concluding that Jamison was stabbed with a "razor or long bladed knife," and maintaining that Ballard was stabbed with a "penknife."

==== Descriptions of Ballard's assailant ====
The next morning, only two newspapers reported on the events that took place at the Ballard home – the Illinois State Register and the Illinois State Journal – both local Springfield newspapers. They both ran descriptions of the assailant; however the accounts differed:

The Illinois State Register described the assailant as being "about five feet eight inches tall, wearing a blue shirt and light colored trousers. The newspaper reported that the police found "a light colored hat," and that the hat was "the only clue" to the assailant's identity.

The Illinois State Journal, on the other hand, described the assailant as being "not very dark in color, medium sized, and dressed in rough garments." The newspaper also reported that a piece of "overall material" (though it would later be reported as a piece of "shirting" that Ballard has in the "grasp" of his hand after the struggle) was found in Ballard's yard, which his son, Homer, would later claim to be the assailant's.

Ballard's son, Homer, also gave a description of the assailant:

The negro was dressed in light trousers, wore a new pair of shoes, blue shirt, brown winter cap and a black coat. He was a yellow negro.

Neighbors of the Ballard's reportedly saw "a negro walking up and down, in front of the Ballard residence," during the early evening of the 4th of July.

==== Statements of attack ====
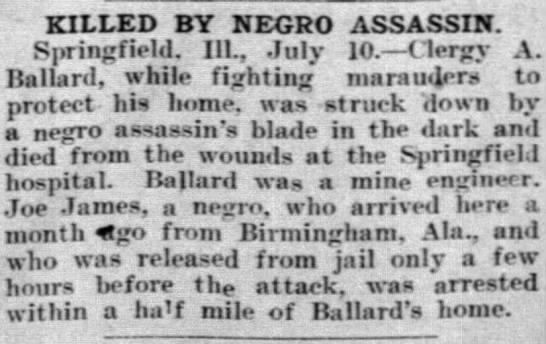
Great Falls Tribune

The day after the attack, Emma Ballard gave the following statement:

The girls, my daughters, were sleeping in the dining room, and my husband and myself in an adjoins room with open double folding doors between. I was awakened by my daughter, Blanche, calling and awakened my husband, telling him that someone was in the house. He arose and went into the room where the girls were sleeping, but the burglar heard him approach and escaped through the front door, which was open when my husband went to look for the man. Mr. Ballard then went to the front door, then out onto the porch. The man, who was a negro, came around the side of the house and my husband attempted to catch him. The negro jerked loose and attacked my husband with a knife. I was standing in the door at the time, but could do nothing. My husband struggled with the negro, but the negro had the advantage and cut him four or five places. Severely cutting him in the neck, on both arms and in the chest. The negro broke loose and ran, leaving my husband badly bleeding on the porch with his night clothes nearly torn off.

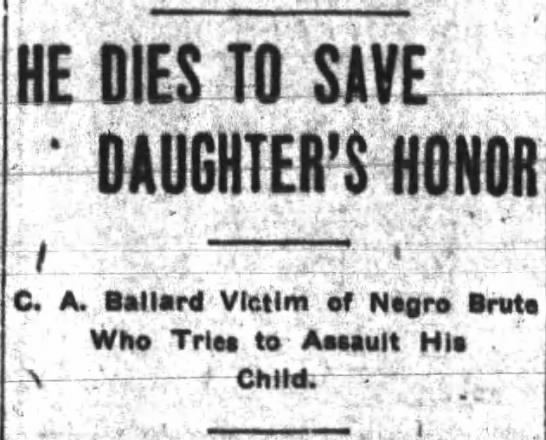
Journal Gazette

Several days after the attack, Blanche Ballard, provided the following statement to authorities:

It was at 12:30 o'clock when I came in. It must have been about 10 minutes to 1 o'clock a.m. when I got up to move a bird in a cage from the window. Then I went back to bed, but did not go sound to sleep. I woke up suddenly and grabbed hold of a man's hand. I thought that he was my brother, and I said to him, 'Is that you, Charlie?' He made a growing noise. Then I asked him again if he were Charlie, and asked him why he did not go to bed and what he was doing. When I said that, I still had hold of his hand, and tried to pull something out of it, something rough. Then the second time I grabbed, he spring to the right side of the bed. He was there no time and jumped right over the foot of the bed again and stood at the foot of the bed. Then he went into the from through a door that was leading from my bedroom and stood in the doorway leading to the front porch. Then when he heard us talking he came back in again and tried to hide behind the door. Then he came back into the dining room where he met mamma. By that time, he heard papa, and papa asked him what he was doing there? Then he ran back through the front room door onto the porch. Papa said, "I wonder where he went to quickly?" With that, they heard the squeaking of shoes around the south side of the house, which cause father to go to the end of the porch and see what it was. As papa got to the end of the porch, the man stabbed him, and papa went back to the door and hollered to my mother to give him something to hit the negro with. The man followed up to the porch and stabbed papa again there on the porch. They began to fight, while there, and they kept fighting until they got to the fourth house from our house.

=== Joe James ===
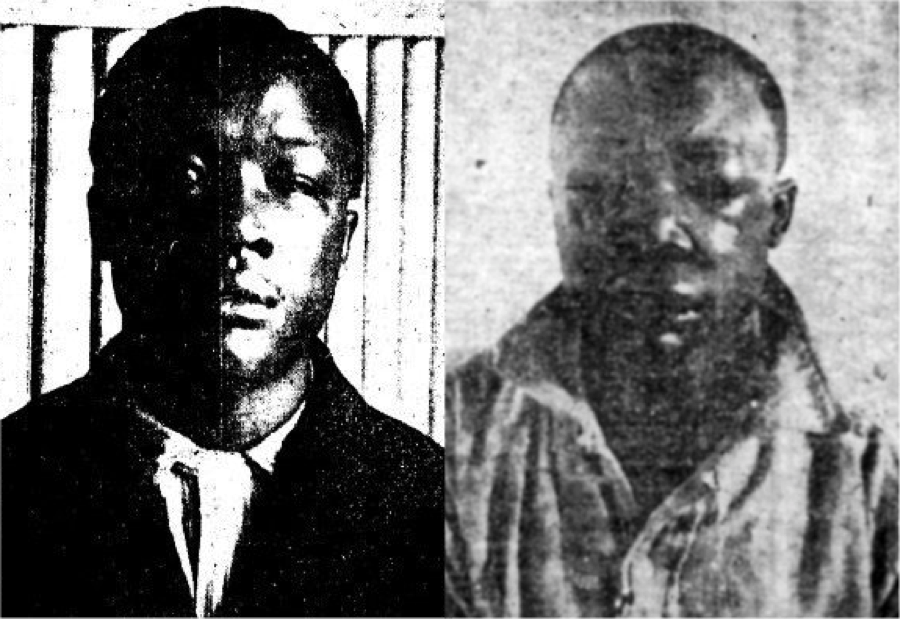
(l) Joe James; (r) Joe James, on Jul 6, 1908, after being beaten in street

Joe James was a young man from Birmingham, Alabama. His father died when he was two. He was then raised by his uncle, Rev. Van B. James, and had a boyhood "but little different from that of the typical negro youth." His uncle raised him in the church, in Avondale, where he learned to read, write and play piano, until he was 13 years old. He then went to live with his mother, Katherine, back in Birmingham, until she moved to Hattiesburg, Mississippi for work. In May 1907, James moved back to Birmingham, where he worked in a brush factory, as a "bristle-puller," and drove a coal wagon, before opting to leave.

Over about four months, James moved to several places doing a series of odd jobs before coming to Springfield. He arrived on June 1, 1908, by hitching a ride on freight train going from St. Louis to Chicago. James wandered around Springfield, attempting to obtain work in a brickyard, or as a moulder. However, no such work was available, and he found work at one of the six black saloons on Sixth Street.

He worked there that evening where he played a game of pool with some "negroes who became sore on him" because he won. He worked past closing, and into the morning of June 2. It was reported that, at some point that day, James got into an altercation at Bud Brandon's saloon, on East Washington street, though this altercation was not verified. When James left work, he encountered William Burton and James Loomis, two of the city's four black police officers. Burton and Loomis were in plainclothes when they saw James walking and, assuming he was loitering, ordered him to leave town. Rather, James "offended the officers" when he reportedly told them:

...A nigger has as much right to be here as a white man. A white man is no better than a nigger.

James told the officers that he had a job, but could not recall the name of the saloon, so they did not believe him. When they threatened to arrest him, James, told them he would leave. The next day, Burton and Loomis "found him on the streets" and arrested him for vagrancy. On June 3, he was fined $25 (about $650 in 2018), which he had no means to pay; therefore he was given a jail sentence. His release was set for July 7.

James, who had been arrested once in Birmingham for trespassing, but never convicted of any crime, was reportedly a model prisoner, permitted to leave and run jailhouse errands as a "trusty". However, on July 4, about 6:00 p.m., after completing his prison duty for the day – loading a lot of "condemned dogs" – James was given about $0.40 ($10.00 in 2018) and allowed to go get molasses, bread and pie for other prisoners. The police claimed that James left the jail "barefooted."

It was Independence Day and most of the retail establishments closed at noon. People were celebrating, drinking early and preparing to see fireworks in the evening. James, a teen who had not been exposed to this level of excitement in Alabama, was enticed to the atmosphere. He wandered into "The Levee" – the city's black vice district, on Washington Street between 7th and 10th Streets – which was filled with an assortment of six saloons, prostitutes, gambling, opiates, etc. The area, along with its adjoining "black" areas (i.e. "The Badlands"), was disdained by many whites, which they called a "den of sin," but also for the normalcy at which black people and whites intermingled, socially and sexually:

...the black belt in Springfield, one of the most vicious districts in the north. The houses of this black belt are hovels. Whites and black people lived together. Children ran through the street of this miserable settlement who know not their parents. Their hair indicates one race and their fair skin the other...[and there are] white resorts where the lowest form of depravity exists.

After purchasing the food for the prisoners, James went to Lee's saloon, on Washington Street, between Eighth and Ninth, where he purchased two beers. From that point, and for six hours, James drank and gambled, primarily at "Dandy Jim's Saloon," where he played the piano "all night" while patrons bought him drinks, and where he "drank himself into insensibility."

==== Attack and arrest of James ====
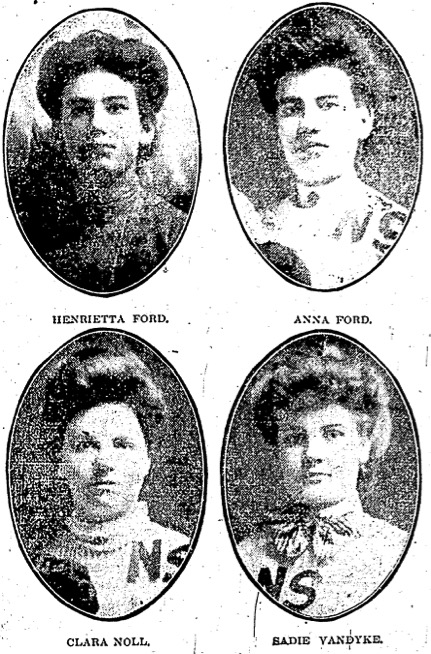
Illinois State Journal

Around 5:30 a.m., on Sunday July 5, four young white women – Clara Noll, Sadie Van Dyke, and Anna and Henrietta Ford – coming from a wake, discovered Joe James sleeping off a hangover, in the North End, about a half-mile away from the Ballard home. Some reports said he was found in the grass in Reservoir park, others reported he was found in the "weeds of a vacant lot" a half-block north of the park, and others reported he was found "in the rear of the watch factory" on the west side of Reservoir park.

While two of the girls watched James, the other two went to a park phone and called "in the vicinity" of the Ballard home, asking for men to come there to investigate. When the news reached Ballard's two sons, Charles and Homer, along with two neighbors, Pledge Sears and Joseph Edwards, who claimed that James had also invaded his home before allegedly invading the Ballard's, went to the area where James was sleeping. The men allegedly found James with blood on his clothes, his shoes not on his feet, and a coat "thrown over his head." They woke him and, armed with a piece of 2x4 scantling, beat "the black wretch" while a crowd gathered around to watch. The Ballard brothers, Sears, and Edwards dragged and beat James for half a block while the crowd chanted "Kill!". It was reported that "only the arrival of officers" prevented the mob from killing James.

James was reportedly not lucid during the beating, and made no effort to resist or defend himself, even as he was dragged for half-a-block toward a nearby telephone with the intent of lynching him. Three deputies, who noticed the gathering crowd as it began chanting, "Kill," then stepped in, stopped the men from beating James, and arrested James. He was booked into the jail at 6:20 a.m.

Five hours later, around 11:45 a.m., Clergy Ballard succumbed to his wounds and died."

==== Descriptions of James and the alleged assailant ====
Upon James's arrest, the Illinois State Register described him as being "about 21 or 22 years old, about five feet six inches in height and [weighing] about 140 pounds." However, two months later, during his trial, the same newspaper would describe him as being "heavily built." The newspaper went on to call him a "copper-hued mulatto," arrested wearing a black coat, blue denim shirt, light trousers and new patent leather shoes. His cap, found at Ballard's home, was said to be a winter hat made of brown wool. Conversely, the Illinois State Journal described James as a "typical southern darkey of medium size and of color not real dark."

James was said to be positively identified by Sheriff Deputy, Harry Taylor, who identified the cap, and the piece of torn shirt, as belonging to James. He was also identified by Bob Oakley, a 38-year-old mulatto, and said to have been a former police officer, who was now a bartender at one of the black saloons. Oakley voluntarily called into the police station when he heard about what happened. Oakley stated that he had seen a "strange negro," ordered out of Bill Johnson's saloon on East Washington street the night before. Oakley was shown the cap and piece of shirt allegedly found at Ballard's home and, "at once furnished a correct description of the little negro [James]..." Oakley added that the "strange negro" was wearing new shoes.

James was also said to have been "positively identified by those who had chased him," "by every member of the Ballard family who had an opportunity of catching a glimpse of the murderer," and by the bloody "penknife" that Officer Jack Golden, accompanied by Ballard's sons, found after James's arrest. The penknife was reportedly located three feet from where James was sleeping on the grass. The penknife, also reportedly stained with blood, had a blade that was fewer than two inches long. The police verified that James had no weapon on him when he left the prison on the afternoon of July 4.

It was reported that James had been kicked out of "Johnson's" saloon for "mooching" money for liquor, with the same report stating: "...how he [James] got back on Ninth street is unknown."

==== James accused ====
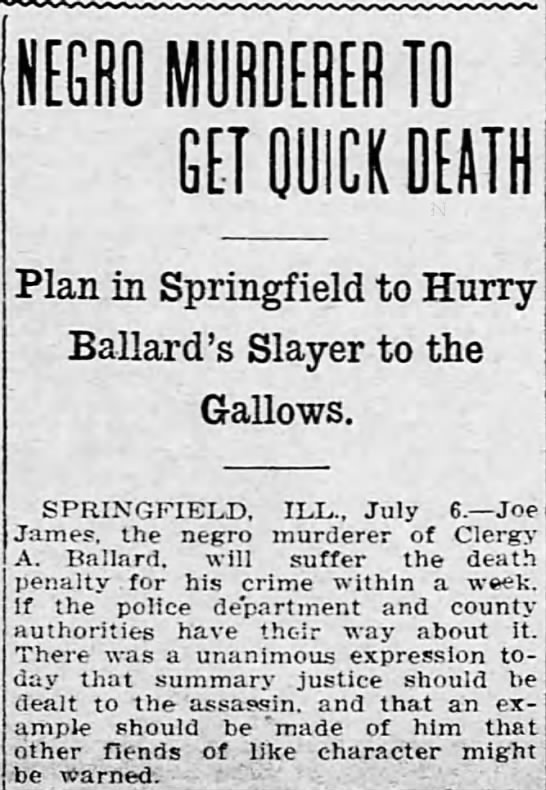
Decatur Herald. 7 Jul 1908.

James was immediately labeled "the murderer." However, newspapers questioned the logic of the reported event, and admitted finding his motives to be "difficult to understand." Robbery had been ruled out because "nothing in the house was molested and Ballard's modest home is not one to attract a burglar." But with the alleged intrusion occurring in the bedroom of Ballard's daughters, and with James being black while the girls were white, it was surmised that James must have been attempting to rape the girl(s), and newspapers began defining him in sexualized terms, i.e. "a brute of the lowest form."

One conclusion that finds most supporters is that James was a degenerate negro, inflamed by strong opiates with a crazed brain that sought satisfaction only in human blood.

— The Decatur Herald, July 6, 1908

Prior to James's arrest, the police thought the assailant, who had robbed the victim of a coat the night before, was probably "the same negro who cut Ballard." Though the victim's description of the assailant did not match the description of James, James became the only suspect after Ballard's son Homer claimed to have found materials of the assailant's at their home. No mention of the other stabbing would ever be reported in newspapers again.

On July 15, James was taken before the special grand jury – the first special grand jury that Sangamon County had ever had. The grand jury was composed of 23 men. They discussed James's case all morning, with county and state officials stating they were prepared to convict James "beyond a shadow of doubt."

James's attorneys entered a "guilty" plea; a strategy to avoid the death penalty that they believed would result in life imprisonment instead. However, it was reported a life sentence would not be well received in Sangamon County as "feelings run high against the negro" among whites who wanted him hanged.

The police department noted that, if it were up to them, they would have hanged James "right away." However, it was determined that "the civil docket is so full that it will be impossible to have the case against James docketed before Aug. 4."

James made no comment about his predicament, only referring reporters back to his initial statements:

Stubborn to the last ditch, and refusing to say a word that will either better or aggravate his defense, the negro wards off all queries propounded on him. Not only does he grumble his evasive answers to those who seek to pinion him down to the facts of the tragedy, but he never entered into conversation with any of the employees at the jail and takes all of his meals without saying a word to anyone. The police and sheriff force have been baffled and they have decided not to question him further...

=== Alleged rape of Mabel Hallam ===
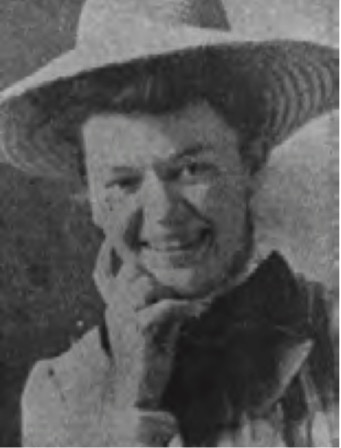
Mabel Hallam

On August 14, the Illinois State Journal reported that a "respectable" young married woman had been attacked in the same working-class neighborhood as Clergy Ballard's – the North End. Mabel V. Hallam (née Trees), the 21-year-old white wife of well-known streetcar conductor, William "Earl" Hallam, claimed that on the night of August 12, at her home, at 1153 Fifth Street, shortly before midnight, a black man cut the screen door to the back door of her home, threatened to kill her, then dragged her, naked, from bed out into her garden, where he raped her and beat her unconscious. She alleged that after the violent assault, she leapt over a back fence and sought help from her mother-in-law.

I was lying in my bed in the front room, with the rear door open, having the screen door latched, and was awaiting the return of my husband, who is employed on the car lines. It was just 11:20 o'clock when that negro came into our home and came directly to my bed. He laid on the bed and grabbed hold of me. This, of course, awakened me. My husband does not possess such habits, and I asked him the question, 'Why Earl, what is wrong with you?' to which the negro replied, 'I am drunk.' Then he commenced gagging me, telling me all the time that if I made any outcry he would kill me. I was so frightened, I could not think of any move to make, although I did manage to make a couple of light screams, one of which was heard by Mrs. Hallam, my mother-in-law, residing next door to us, and whose bedroom is only a few feet from mine. The fellow dragged me into the back yard, carrying and pulling me through the kitchen of our home. He pulled and jerked and yanked at me until we were in one of the outbuildings. All the time his fingers were buried into my neck and the pain was intense. Finally, he released me, going out through the front yard. I claimed the fence into the yard of my mother-in-law, and there met her coming to help me. It was then 11:45 o'clock, just twenty-five minutes after he pounced upon me in my room.

==== George Richardson accused ====
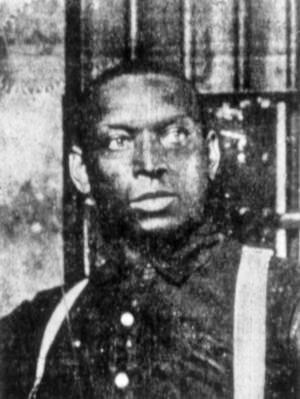
George Richardson

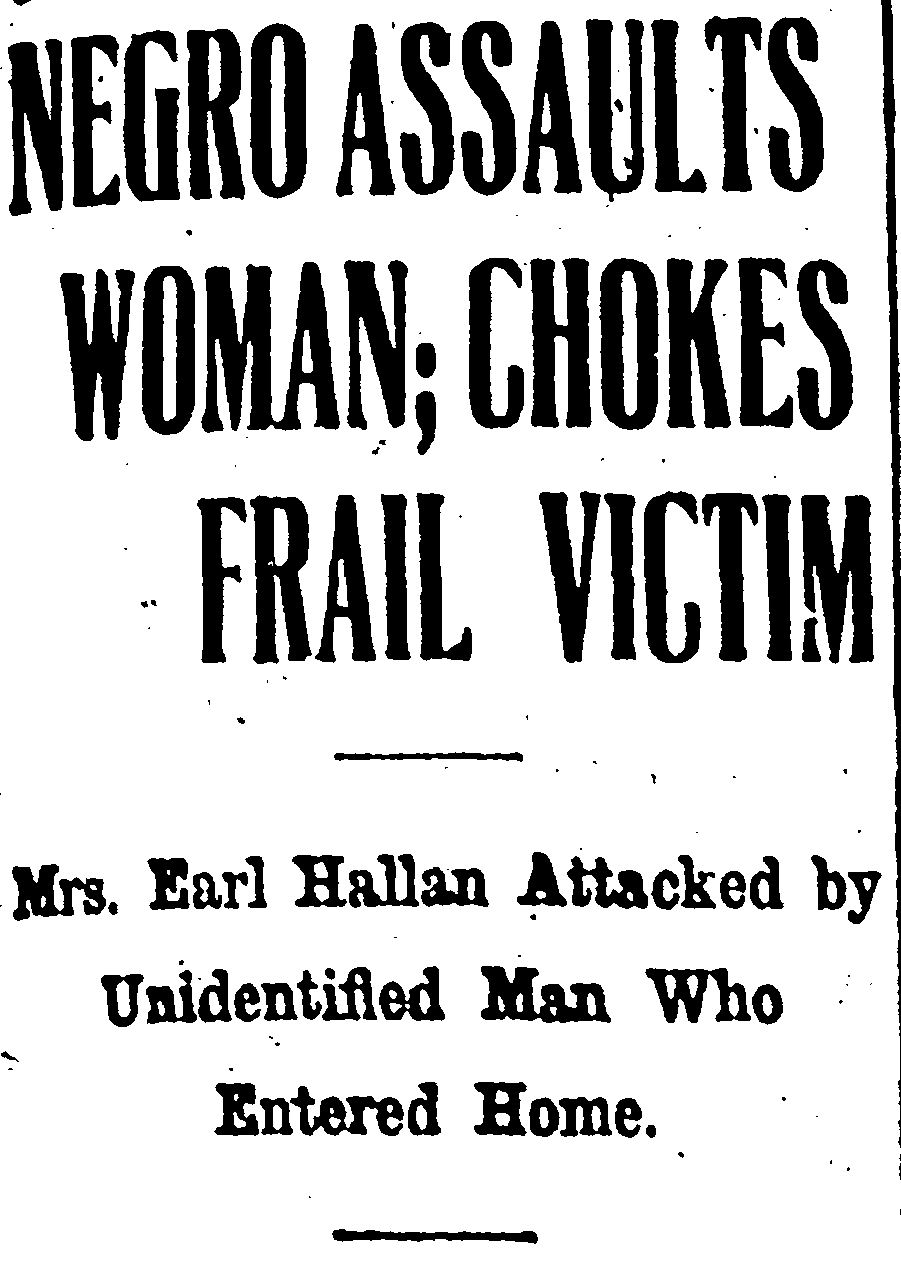
Illinois State Journal

George Richardson was a 36-year-old black, lifetime resident of Springfield. He was from a prominent black family in Springfield; his grandfather had been Abraham Lincoln's barber, and white newspapers cited him having "above the ordinary intelligence." At the time, he was a hod carrier, working on a home with other black builders, on North Fifth Street, near Hallam's home.

The police, assigned to look for Hallam's attacker the night before, saw the men working and surmised that the perpetrator was "probably" among the group. The police took the men, changed their clothes and, one by one, delivered them to Hallam's home, where she pointed out Richardson as her attacker:

Mrs. Mabel Hallam...suffered from the nervous shock today, but was otherwise unhurt from her terrible experience. She was able to put up with the ordeal of facing strange negroes during the day and inspecting a number, none of whom she recognized, save Richardson.

Richardson professed his innocence, maintaining that he was at home, all night, with his wife, Maud, at 1305 East Capitol Avenue. His wife, who was said to have an "excellent reputation among her acquaintances, regardless of color," validated Richardson's alibi and was committed to testifying in his defense:

As God is my judge, I am innocent of the crime I am charged with at Springfield. I have tried to conduct myself so as to win respect of my white neighbors, and believe that I have done so. I was born in Springfield, educated in the public schools there, and have always lived there. I am 36 years of age, have a wife, but no children. My wife believes in me and we are proud of our little home. I have worked for Mr. Rhinehart, contractor, for some time, and always work when I can find work to do.

I worked all day Thursday, and went home at 6 o'clock awfully tired. I ate my supper, sat on the porch and smoked until 8 or half-past 8 o'clock and went to bed. I never left my room that night, but went to work Friday morning as usual. I was arrested while at work and was much surprised to be taken for this crime.

I believe that my neighbors will support my alibi and vouch for my good character. I never saw Mrs. Hallam before until she identified me as the man who assaulted her. She is mistaken. I am ready to go back whenever the authorities think safe to do so and stand trial. – George Richardson, August 15, 1908

However, the police claimed that his coat was "torn" and that they found "a trace of blood" on his coat. This was in line with Hallam's statement that she "tore her assailant's coat." Richardson also remained a suspect because it was erroneously reported that he had served time in St. Charles prison for being involved in a fight, resulting in someone's death, and that he had only been out of jail for two years. However, after the incident was investigated, it turned out that he had a clean record, had never had any issue with the law, and unlike many black people in Springfield, was a property owner.

Despite multiple eyewitness account placing Richardson on his porch with his wife at the time of the attack, police arrested Richardson and took him to the county jail, where Hallam hesitantly picked him out of a lineup of potential suspects. She cautioned that she could not be certain if Richardson was her alleged attacker because "all colored men looked alike" to her, telling Richardson:

I believe that you are the man, and you will have to prove that you are not.

Richardson was charged with rape and put in a cell with Joe James. Hallam had even produced a witness, 17-year-old [William] Rolla Keys, to testify against Richardson. Keys lived at 1149 N. Fifth Street, at the time, which was two homes away from Hallam's home, at 1153 N. Fifth St.

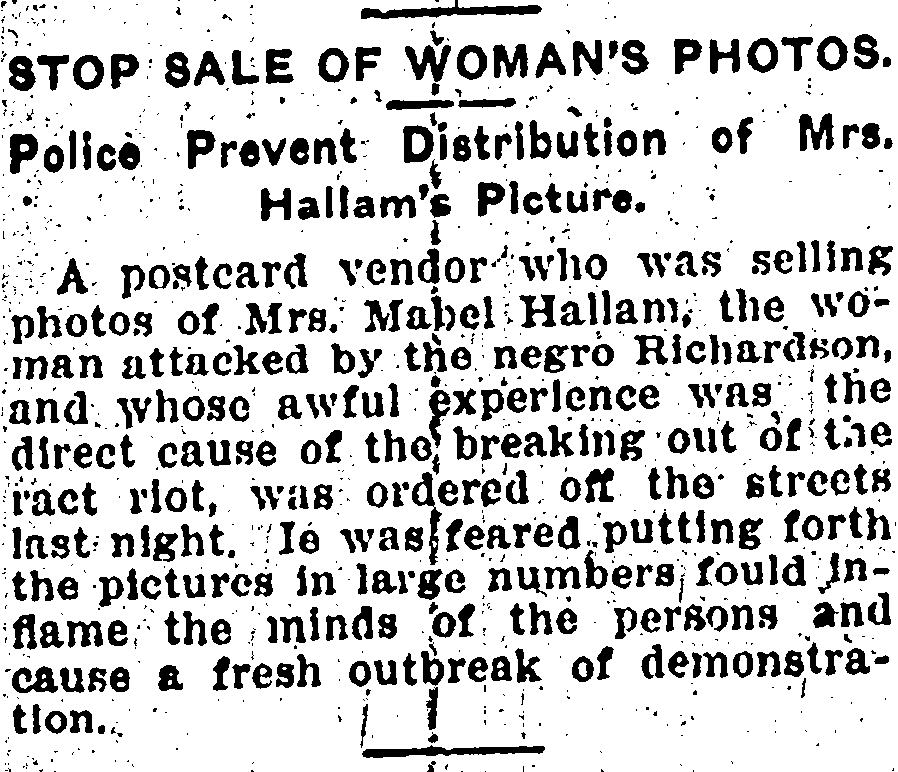
Illinois State Journal

While in jail, it was reported that people in Springfield speculated that Hallam's husband, unable to cope with her allegedly being raped by a black man, would leave her. False rumors also began to circulate that Hallam had "positively identified" Richardson, and that he had confessed to committing the crime. It was reported that because three other young women lived nearby, that the black man was "waiting to catch the first one of the three" that stepped outside.

After he was arrested, Richardson's brothers were also persecuted. His younger brother, Tom, a produce clerk, was chased out of town when he was attacked in the wagon, that he drove for a packing firm, in the street. He escaped, left his wagon behind, jumped on a train at Illinois Central Station, and fled to Mississippi. Richardson's older brothers, James and William, were arrested and thrown in jail for "public safety."

Conversely, Mabel Hallam had contracted to have her likeness sold by a postcard vendor for money, while her husband was appointed a "special deputy sheriff" to their neighborhood.

== Mob ==
=== The ruse ===
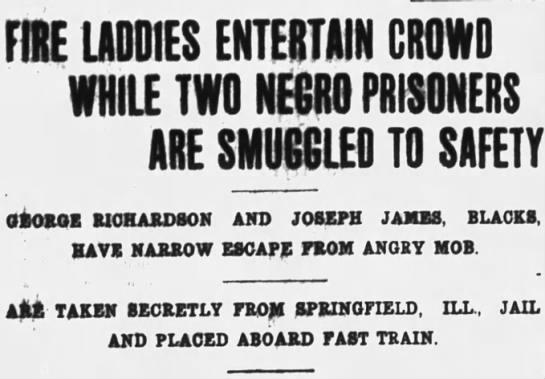
Eau Claire Leader

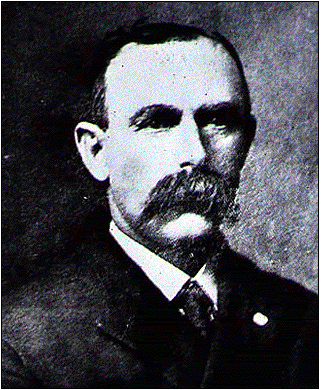
Sheriff Werner

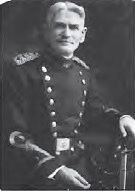
Harry T. Loper

Early in the afternoon of August 14, once Mabel Hallam "positively identified" her attacker, a crowd of about 3,000 white men gathered in downtown Springfield, looking to lynch James and Richardson. The crowd, numbering about 5,000, went to the Sangamon County Jail, surrounded the scaffolding that was being built there for Joe James, and demanded the prisoners be given to them so they could "lynch the niggers!"

Around 4:30 p.m., the commander of the Third Division of the Illinois National Guard, Colonel Richings J. Shand, was alerted to the conditions around the jail by Captain H. H. Tuttle, an Assistant Surgeon, with the Fourth Infantry. Shand claimed to have alerted Governor Charles Deneen, who directed him to consult with the sheriff of the area, Sheriff Charles Werner. When Shand arrived to the jail, Werner allegedly told Shand that "he did not consider the situation serious at all," and that troops were not necessary. Shand stated that he told Werner that, given Werner was responsible for keeping the peace in the area, if he rejected Deneen's offer of troops, and a riot broke out, that Werner, alone, would be responsible. Werner then requested one pre-cautionary Company – Troop D of the 1st Cavalry (1st)– be placed at the State Arsenal building. Shand convinced Werner to place two additional companies there – Troop D, Company C of the 5th Infantry (5th), and the four men of the Gatling Gun Platoon of the same company.

Werner ordered the 5th and the Gatling Platoon to remain at the Arsenal building, and for the 1st to assemble at 8:00 p.m. Shand, however, argued that 8:00 p.m. would be too late, as mobs get more unwieldy at night. He pressed Werner for a 7:00 p.m. assembly, but Werner refused.

Werner believed he had the situation under control as he had pre-arranged for firemen to respond to an orchestrated false fire alarm at 5:08 p.m. While people were distracted, watching the firemen, Werner enlisted 49-year-old Harry T. Loper, a wealthy restaurateur, a commissary of the Second Brigade of the Illinois National Guard, and owner of one of the few automobiles in Springfield, to drive James and Richardson to McLean County Jail, about 65 miles away, in Bloomington, for their safety.

Loper was escorted by Sheriff Deputies Kramer, Hanrahan and Rhodes, and Sergeant of Police, Fred Yanzell. Once they reached Bloomington, James and Richardson were put on a train to Peoria, as Werner feared the mob might go to Bloomington and try to retrieve them.

After the crowd learned that Loper had arranged the suspects' transfer, the trickery upset them more. Werner ordered the crowd to disperse; however, many went to go watch a 5-Cent Picture Show while others, still angry, walked the streets or went to saloons to go drink.

=== Loper's ===
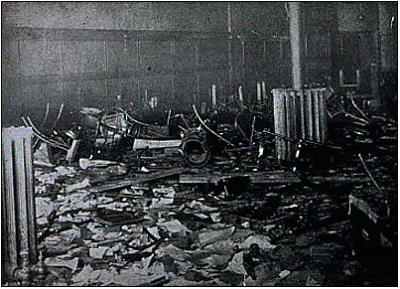
Remains of Loper's restaurant. 14 Aug 1908.

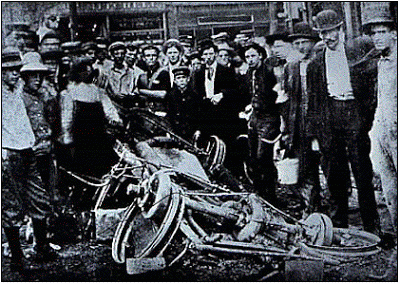
Remains of Loper's automobile. 14 Aug 1908.

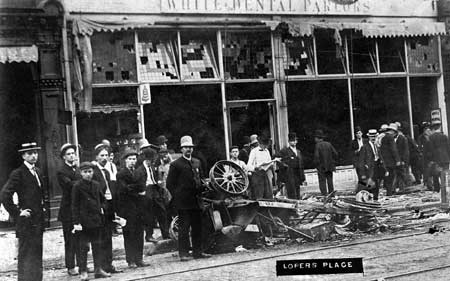
Loper's after the attacks

Soon after Loper returned from Bloomington, around 8:00 p.m., he was confronted with a mob, armed with brickbats, clubs and revolvers, who showed up to Loper's restaurant for revenge.

The mob was led by Kate Howard, a 42-year-old white divorcee who had a reputation for being "loose with the boys." Howard, whose ex-husband was highly respected and owned a wallpaper store on Eighth and Adams, had lived in Springfield nearly 20 years, where she ran the Howard Hotel (a boarding house rumored to be one of the city's roughly 30 white brothels) with her brother, William E. Connor, at 115 1/2 North Fifth Street. Howard shouted on the mob to destroy Loper's property:

What is the matter with you fellows, are you afraid to go in?

Loper, who had served black people at his establishment, was prepared to defend his property. He fired a warning shot, with his shotgun, over the crowd when they began throwing bricks into his restaurant. But as the crowd descended upon the premises, Loper retreated further into the building, where he would escape through a hole in the brick wall. The crowd tore through the restaurant, raiding and hurling his liquor.

At this point, only 26 militiamen of the 1st and 5th had assembled. Shand sent them to the jail and, armed with bayonets, instructed them to clear the mob of over 3,000. As the men tried to do so, Shand received a call from Governor Deneen that there was trouble at Loper's. Shand ordered the men at the Arsenal to go over to Loper's to assist, with the 1st and the 5th, but Werner refused, telling Shand that he did not want to leave the jail for the mob. Werner allowed only 10 militiamen to go to Loper's, and forbade them to fire upon the crowd.

At Loper's, the mob destroyed the restaurant's interior – tossing the tables and chairs onto the street while, at least, four uniformed police officers watched. They then distributed the cigarettes and silverware among themselves as souvenirs. William F. Lee, a looter at Loper's restaurant, laughed as he recalled:

I seen old Barney Lang, one of the dry goods merchants or clothing merchants, out on the street picking bricks out of the street and throwing them through Loper's restaurant. And of course, I went down into Loper's and, between I and another guy I was raised with and went to school with, Horney Barberry...I ran into him at Loper's. And Horney Barberry and I went down and knocked the cash register over and got the change out of it.

Outside, the mob overturned Loper's car and lit the gas tank, destroying it. They threw the tables and chairs into the fire, making a bonfire with flames that reached as high as they third floor of the building. The mob danced around the bonfire in "frenzied delight and fiendish glee."

Mayor Roy Reece arrived at the scene and begged the mob to disperse, but they threatened to "throw him to the fire too!" The mob held the mayor hostage for two hours before friends of his were able to extract him and bring him to safety.

When a wagonload of police finally arrived, the mob dragged them from the wagon, confiscated their clubs and tore their insignia from their uniforms. Firemen also arrived, but the mob cut their fire hose with razors. By the time the 10 militiamen arrived, to a crowd now numbering about 5,000, they found "no disposition on the part of civil authorities to assist them." However, the militiamen conceded that they were "helpless" because, prior to leaving the State Arsenal to come to Loper's they only procured one box of rifles there, but found no ammunition in the building. In addition, Governor Deneen forbade the militia from using their Gatling gun and, for reasons never explained, the ammunition wagon that was assigned to come to them, never came. The few soldiers who were armed, were overrun, and their weapons were confiscated, by the mob.

Once the crowd dispersed, a white 19-year-old rubber-necker, Louis Johnston, was found dead in the basement, with a shot in the neck. He was the first casualty of the events. Loper managed to escape the crowd, taking his family to Michigan for safety, where he would learn that the "riot" had voided out any insurance claim he might have sought. Loper would later say, of his decision to help the Sheriff:

I have been through one riot in Cincinnati in '83, the greatest in this country, when 100 men were killed. It was to avoid loss of life that I took those men out of town. I did not favor the man; I have no interest in him whatever, and would go just as far to punish him as anybody, but after going through the Cincinnati riot and knowing this sheriff as I do I know he would be killed first before he would let the jail be taken. I thought I would save lives by removing the colored man.

Around this time, Governor Deneen called for an increase of militiamen; realizing local authorities were overwhelmed.

=== The "Levee" ===
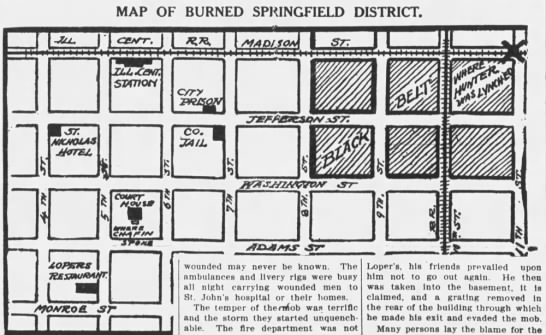
The McHenry Plaindealer. Map of attacks. Aug 20 1908.

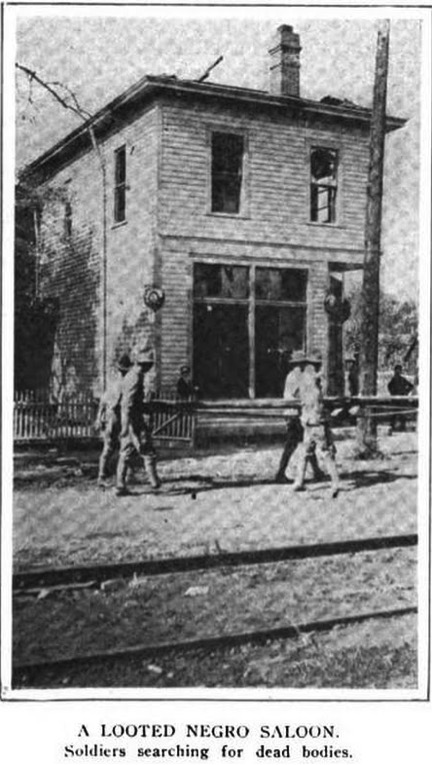
The Independent

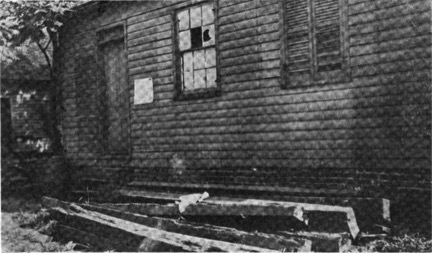
White clothing marking the home as "white-occupied"

Around 10:00pm, the crowd moved to Washington Street, chanting, "Curse the day that Lincoln freed the niggers," "No niggers in Springfield," and "Kill 'em on sight!" They went to the Lyric Picture Show, also owned by Loper, on Spring and Edwards, and destroyed it. They also reportedly attempted to burn down the former home of Abraham Lincoln, but were thwarted by a relative of Lincoln's, Ninian Edwards, who was at the property and was a custodian of the home.

The mob bypassed the white-owned "Payne's Gun Store," which owned most of the guns and ammunition in the city, and instead went to "Fishman's" pawnshop, at 719 East Washington, which was owned by Reuben Fishman, a Jewish man. A member of the mob claimed Fishman was selling guns to black people, so they went to his shop and demanded guns and ammunition from him. When he refused, they called him a "nigger lover," ransacked his shop, taking every gun in it, and set the shop on fire. The mob also overtook a cavalry squadron – Troop B of Taylorsville – usurping their weapons, and making the cavalrymen flee for their lives. By 11:00pm, the sound of gunshots was constant.

Sheriff Werner did not allow police to confront the mob along Washington Street. And, while Shand made the call for about 50 additional troops to 9th and Madison, Werner forbade them from going toward the heavy violence, telling Shand it was "injudicious to leave the jail unguarded." When Shand replied that he could leave the 5th to guard the jail, Werner refused, telling Shand that he wanted to wait for reinforcements; however, reinforcements would not arrive for another four hours, at around 2:20 a.m.

During that time, the mob began attacking black businesses with hatchets and axes, "wrecking vengeance upon the negro population without mercy."

Proclaiming that they were going to "clean up" and "fix this street so a white woman can walk along here without being annoyed," they tore through black barbershops, car shops and bicycle shops, and churches, hurling things through windows, looting property, and establishments buildings down. There were bricks piled all along the street.

They then went to the black saloons, starting with Dandy Jim's, where Joe James had played the piano before being accused of murder. As the mob tore into the building, "Dandy Jim," whose real name was James Smith, tried to protect his business and several black women who lived above his saloon, by firing at the crowd through his second floor window. However, when it was clear his effort was of no use, he fled the premises through a back alley, ran, and hid in a feed yard as the mob ripped out the front of his building and demolished the interior.

The mob went through all six black saloons, confiscating, and drinking the alcohol, before vandalizing the premises. They also went to hotels – such as the Siles Hotel, the Leland, and the St. Nicholas – looking for black guests. They dragged out those that they found and beat them in the streets. White women, and young white girls, were also participants in the mob, and in the beatings. It was reported that the attacks seemed to have been "planned" as they simultaneously occurred in six areas.

The mob destroyed a total of 35 other Black-owned businesses, shattering windows and storefronts, and looting property, all along Washington Street, terrorizing black people (i.e. beating black people with their own furniture). The mob particularly targeted the homes and businesses of "uppity" black people e.g. political insiders, men of wealth, men in relationships with white women, etc. and of any whites known to be in relationships with, or thought to be sympathetic to, black people. Republican businessman, C.C. Lee, saw all of his businesses – a saloon, pool hall, barbershop, restaurant, and movie theatre, "The Star" – demolished. Democratic influencer, William Johnson, also lost his saloon.

Black people sought shelter wherever they could find it. For example, the mob chased a black man to a political speech where Prohibition Party Candidate, Eugene W. Chafin, was speaking. The black man ran onto the stage with Chafin, in fear. Chafin protected him, telling the mob, on stage: "I will shoot the first [white] man who attempts to take this colored man." However, as he made that proclamation, someone in the mob hurled a brickbat at his head, knocking him down, which started a melee between the mob and Chafin's supporters.

Houses and businesses owned by whites were spared damage, so long as white clothing was hung from their windows to signal that the home was "white-occupied." Once seeing that a place was owned, or inhabited, by whites, the mob would shout things like, "Leave it alone; there's no niggers there!" or "That's a white man's place; pass it up!" However, the mob, and the crowd of onlookers, totaling near 10,000, prevented the fire department from making runs to the burning homes of black people.

Despite such things, when 30-year-old William H. Bowe – the high society chief clerk of the country treasure's office, who had come from a nearby town in order to participate in the attack – was allegedly shot by a "gang of negro thugs" as he was allegedly on his way "home," through The Badlands" at 3:00am, near the spot where Burton was lynched 30 minutes prior. Bowe's shooting would later be described as "murderous assault," and reported as "a sign of the feelings with which the black people regarded all whites."

=== The "Badlands" ===
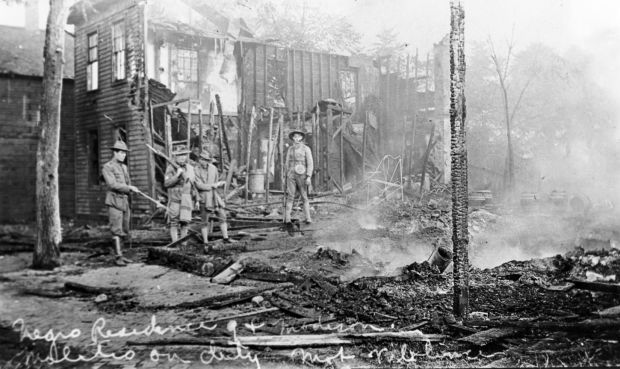
Ruins of "The Badlands"

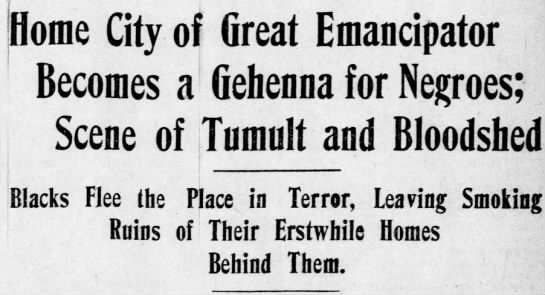
Pittsburgh Daily Post

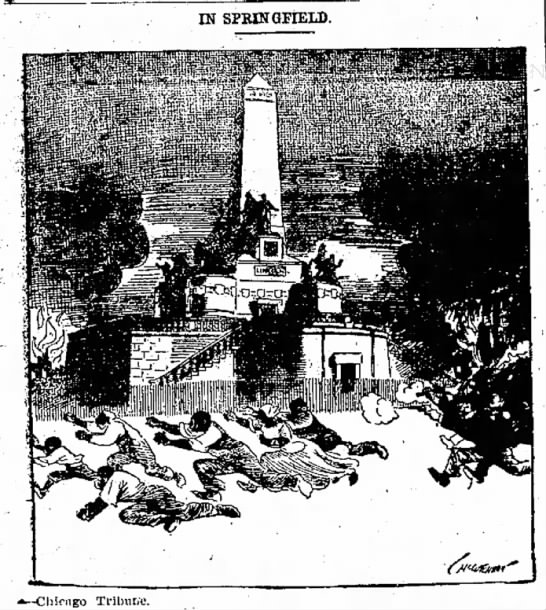
Cartoon, Springfield Attacks

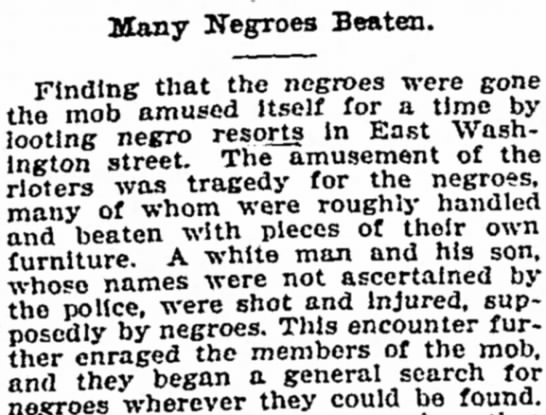
The Courier-Journal

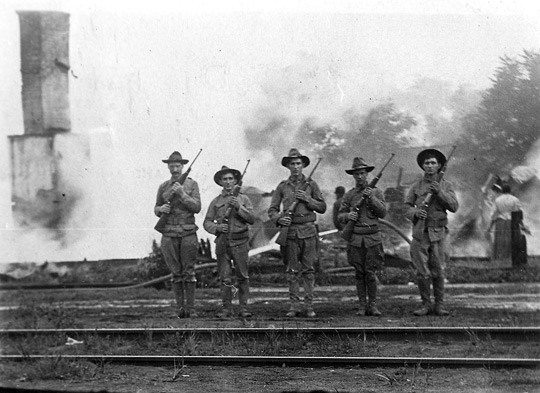
Militia in The Badlands

The Badlands was the poorest neighborhood in Springfield. It was a four-square-block area that extended from The Levee, and was bound by East Jefferson on the south, East Reynolds on the north, and from Ninth Street east to Springfield city limits. While most of the area's inhabitants were poor, several upper-middle class black people also resided there. However, due to its proximity to the Levee, the area was vulnerable to pockets of vice. It was described by the press as an area "infested with negroes" living in "huts" and rife with crime:

Practically all of the black belt was disreputable. The houses were hovels, mere make-shifts for coverings.

Around 1:00 a.m., Kate Howard led the torch-carrying mob down Madison Street, and into The Badlands, pointing out which black homes and businesses to destroy, to a mob now vowing to "kill every nigger in town!"

As they made their way to the first black home, where two black men and a woman sought refuge, a police officer made his way through the mob and stood in front of the home. He proclaimed:

Give me these niggers, and you can burn down the entire row of houses.

The mob torched its way through the Badlands, totally destroying the area, where "a few men would enter a shack, and after tipping over the bed and tearing open the mattress, would pour on a little oil and apply a match. That was all there was to it. They left then feeling sure that the fire would not be interfered with and it wasn't." The mob would not permit even "a stream of water" to save any of the black homes, though, like in The Levee, permitted aid to white homes:

You can save any white people's houses near here, but the nigger houses have got to go!

Some mob members also forced black people to burn to death in their homes:

...there was a lot of colored people burnt up in that riot...there was colored people run out and set the houses on fire, anybody run out and they knock him in the head, pick him up and throw him back, throw him back in the house. – William F. Lee, Loper's Restaurant Looter

At 2:30 a.m. Saturday morning, Shand and some troops accompanied Sheriff Werner to Twelfth and Madison streets, where Werner asked the crowd to disperse three times, but was ignored and jeered. Shand advised allowing the troops to take a volley of shots, low, below the knees of the crowd. However, Werner refused, and ordered the troops to shoot a volley over heads of the mob, but agreed to allow Shand to immediately fire low if the high volley did not work.

When the troops laid the high volley, it only further enraged the mob, which still did not disperse. Shand prepared the troops to immediately fire low, but Werner reneged on his agreement on the low fire, protested, and began giving contradictory orders to Shand's troops. With the noise and confusion, this resulted in some of the troops firing high, while others fired low, injuring and killing several mob participants, which dispersed the crowd. After the mob had cleared, the troops cut down the body of a black man, Scott Burton, who had been lynched nearby.

The troops of the 1st then addressed the mob at Mason Street, west of Twelfth, and had begun driving the mob back. The Captain sent for assistance to Sheriff Werner and Shand, pleading that he could not disperse the crowd unless given the authority to fire into it. However, again, Shand refused. The troops, being unable to control the mob, could "do nothing but report back to the main body and practically leave this crowd in possession of Mason Street, west of Twelfth," leaving that area of the Badlands under the rule of the mob:

At no time during the riot did the actual command pass from the sheriff to the military authorities.

— Commander Shand

The following morning, the city was littered with the bodies of drunken mob members who had passed out in the street. Shortly after 12:00 p.m. Sunday morning, Deneen ordered additional militia. By early Monday morning, there were nearly 3,700 officers and militiamen in the city.

Throughout the day, rumors would be reported about black people retaliating. The troops would send a squad to investigate, and the squad would find no truth to the rumors i.e. that a black man was trying to set fire to a home north of Grand Avenue. Though the rumors were found to be untrue, getting the troops to break into small squads, and search home by home, served to segment the militia.

In some cases, the militia joined in mob activities. For example, a black family, the Mitchell's, raised their own meat, smoked their own ham, and procured watermelons that they would sell to neighbors. The Mitchells had a large icebox that they used to store this food. Militiamen entered the Mitchell home and raised the icebox of all its food. Also, at least one militiaman was arrested for "disorderly conduct."

== Lynchings ==
The crowd moved on toward the Badlands, the heart of the Black residential area, burning down homes. The mob destroyed a four-block area and caused much damage to neighboring streets. When firefighters arrived, the mob impeded their progress by slashing their hoses. Many black people fled town, found refuge with sympathetic Whites, or hid in the State Arsenal, where the White militia protected them. The militia finally dispersed the crowd late that night after reinforcements arrived after 2:00 a.m.

=== Scott Burton ===
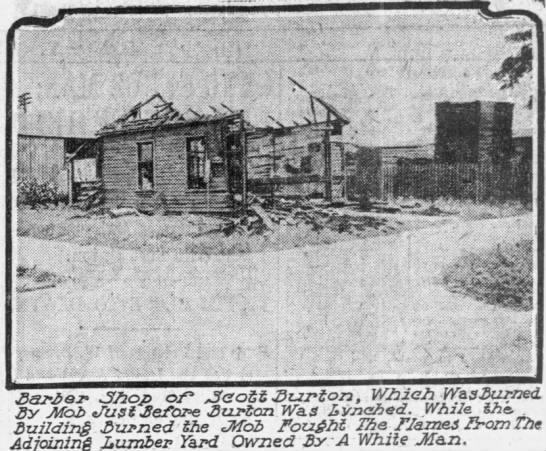
Burned remains of Burton's barber shop

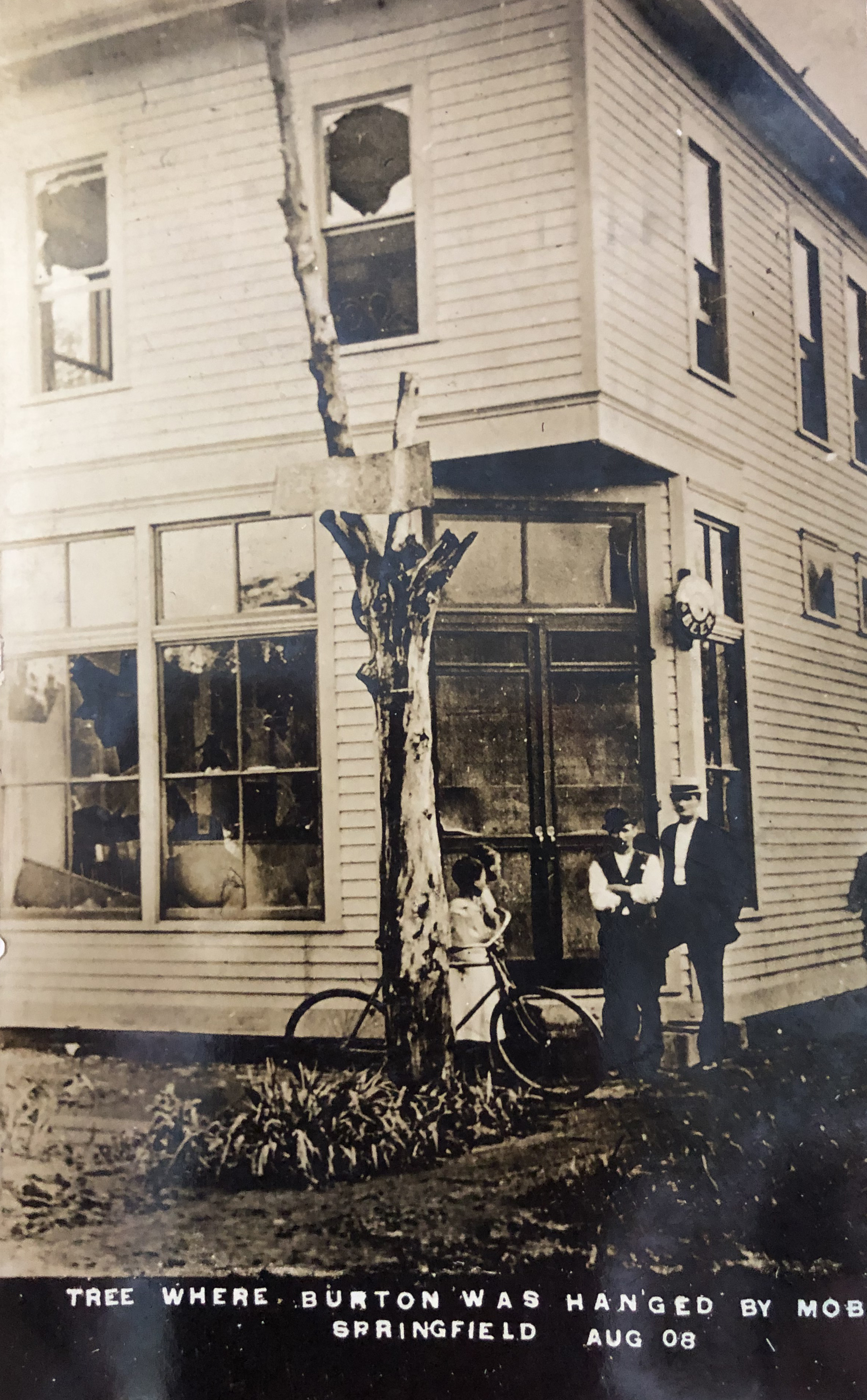
Postcard of tree where Scott Burton was hanged

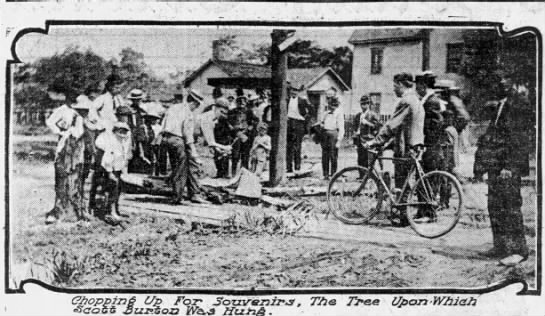
Chopping up the tree Burton was lynched on for souvenirs. Chicago Tribune. 17 Aug 1908.

Scott Burton, a 65-year-old black man, had a small barbershop, located at 12th and Madison, that catered exclusively to white clientele. Around 2:30 a.m., Burton had been at home with his family, and his wife, Kate (née Qualls), when the mob, offering bounties of "twenty-five dollars for a nigger!" approached his home and threatened them. Burton allegedly fired a warning shot out over the crowd, further enraging them. Moments later, the mob rushed into his home:

Father was sitting in the house with us when the mob came around the corner. Some of them came into the house...Several of them struck him with bottles, and one man had an axe, which he hit him with...The men then took him out of the house, and that is the last we saw.

— Burton's daughter

The mob beat Burton (who was falsely identified in some reports as "Charles Hunter") until his head was "a bloody lacerated mass of flesh. While he was unconscious, they then tied a rope around his neck and dragged him one block south, to Madison and Twelfth streets, to a tree near his barbershop, as men and women spat on him. The mob, including Mabel Hallam's husband, William, sought to lynch Burton, with one of the mob participants calling out, "Get the rope." However, the mob did not have any rope on hand. Someone grabbed a nearby clothesline, wrapped it around Burton's neck. They then stripped off his clothes and pulled the clothesline up, over the tree, and hanged him. After he was dead, the mob mutilated his body, riddling it with 30 bullets, slashing it with knives, and attempting to set it on fire. Children played with Burton's body, swinging it back and forth on the tree, while the mob shouted: "We've got one, hurrah! Look at that nigger swing!" They then danced around it.

The mob then burned down Burton's barbershop. As it burned, mob members raced to ensure the fire did not spread to the adjoining white businesses. Burton would later be blamed for his own death, by Governor Deneen, who suggested that Burton incensed the mob when he fired a warning shot, trying to protect his family and property.

=== William Donnegan ===
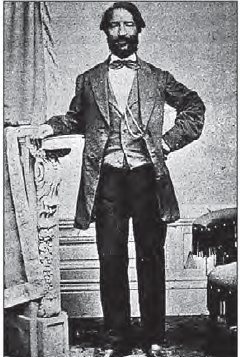
William Donnegan

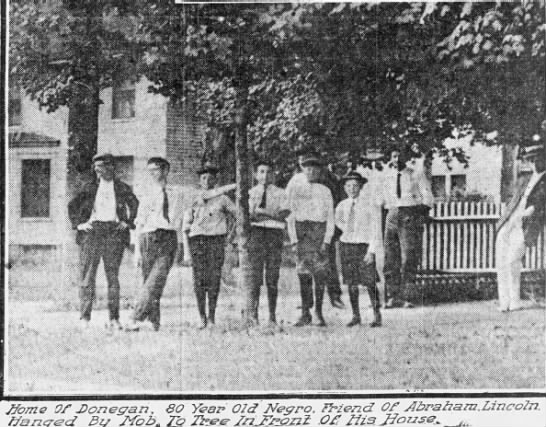
Two days after lynching

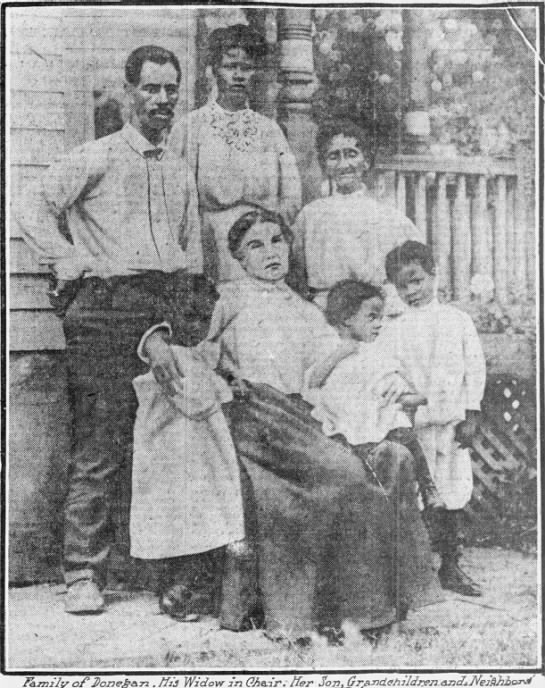
Donnegan family after William's death

The next evening, August 15, around 7:00pm, more militiamen arrived to maintain order. Curiosity seekers and tourists, who heard of the attacks, also arrived in the city. A new mob, of about 1,000 whites, formed and approached the State Arsenal seeking to harm about 300 black residents who had taken refuge there. When confronted by a militiaman, the crowd splintered off and changed direction, with about 200 of them heading to southwest Springfield, an area where few black people lived. One of the black people who did live there was William K. H. Donnegan.

Kentucky-born Donnegan was an 80-year-old black man, and former friend of Abraham Lincoln and General John M. Palmer. He had resided in Springfield about 60 years, was a cobbler, prominent in real estate, and well-respected. It is rumored he became wealthy by importing slave labor to Springfield, before The Civil War. After the War, he served as a middle man to whites in Springfield who sought to contract with newly freed labor. Though he would be criticized for procuring a system for these new black people, which greatly resembled slavery, Donnegan was responsible for bringing many of Springfield's initial black residents to the city. Because of this, some whites "blamed" him for the black population existing in Springfield.

Known as "Uncle Bill," Donnegan was the most well-known black man in Springfield. He was reportedly worth about $15,000 (about $540,000 in 2025), and also owned his home, as well as other properties, that housed some of his family members. While Donnegan had broken no laws, he was an influential black man, who had also been married to Sarah Rudolph, a 52-year-old Irish-German woman, for over 30 years. He was said to have also angered his all-white neighborhood, as he refused to sell his property and move.

Around 9:00pm, the mob arrived at Donnegan's home, with many in the mob later admitting that they targeted him because he was "married to a white woman." Donnegan's family called the jail, and the militia headquarters, for help long before the mob arrived.

We had been warned that a mob was coming, and we telephoned to the jail and asked for soldiers. We telephoned several times, and though we were promised each time that the soldiers would come, they did not. We were afraid to stay, but didn't know where to go, so had to wait there. When the men came to the door, they asked, 'Are there any niggers there?' William said, 'No, only white people.' 'You're a liar,' a man hollered...

— Donnegan's sister

The mob started making threats to burn his home down, and then six of the mob members ran inside, firing their guns. Donnegan's family fled out the back of his home, but he suffered from severe rheumatism and was nearly blind, so he could not go with them. Instead, he fled under a bed, but the mob found him, hit him in the face and dragged him outside, where people threw bricks and stones at him.

Donnegan pleaded with them to "have mercy on him," noting that he "hadn't done anything to them" and, at one point saying, "Even I've worked on some of your shoes." The mob ignored his pleas and senselessly beat him. As he staggered around, after the beating, his throat was slashed with a razor. His throat was rumored to have been cut by a 10-year-old boy; however Abraham Raymer, a very short, non-naturalized immigrant, who was childlike in appearance, was later suspected of being the culprit.

After his throat was cut, someone yelled, "Drown him in the water trough!" while others screamed, "Lynch him!" Donnegan was dragged over to a low tree, across the street from his home, in front the Edwards school yard, two blocks away from the Governor's office. One of the mob members grabbed a nearby clothesline, which was then looped around his neck four times, and once around his face and mouth, before it was tied around the tree, from which he was then hanged. However, because the tree was short, his feet were only partially suspended off the ground.

Once Donnegan was hanged, some of the mob went back over to his house, and attempted to set his home on fire; however, militiamen arrived to the scene, and the perpetrators ran away. The militia found Donnegan still alive. His awkward position kept him alive, until the police came. They found him with his "neck severed...breathing through the holes in his windpipe." When they cut him down, they could not remove a piece of the clothesline from his mouth, as it had gotten locked in his jaw, which had become "firmly set."

Donnegan, who never regained consciousness, had the 8-inch gash across his neck sewn up by Captain H. H. Tuttle. The mob had also broken skin in several places, which the militia physician attended. He was eventually taken to St. John's hospital, where he died the next morning.

Two days after he was lynched, Donnegan's niece, who fled to Chicago after he was lynched, would say of his murder:

They say my uncle was killed because he is married to a white woman, but they have been married twenty years, have children, and own considerable property. And the property was the cause of his murder. He was even told by some of the ringleaders of the mob that he had too much property for a 'nigger.'

— Carrie Hamilton, August 17, 1908

== Aftermath ==
=== Casualties ===
Over 100 whites were documented as being injured while participating in the attacks. It is unknown how many black people were injured as many fled, and also due to white city officials and most newspapers, opted not to record the injuries of black people who stayed or returned. Seven people were on record as being dead: two Black men and five Whites. However, there were several more unreported deaths, such as Louis Hanen, a white man who was struck in his chest, groin and chin, along with John Colwell, by a volley laid down by the militia near Twelfth and Madison. Hanen did not succumb to his injuries until November. In addition to Scott Burton and William Donnegan, there were also six unidentified black people killed.

All five of the white men who were killed, died at the hands of other white mob members, or by the hands of the white state militia. A sixth white person, Earl Nelson, was bayonetted to death in Kankakee. In addition, at least one black infant died from exposure, after her family was made refugees and no neighboring community would allow them in. Some black deaths were unaccounted for because their loved ones buried them at night out of fear that whites might attack them, while the loved ones of other black people transported the bodies of their dead off to the countryside for burial. It was also said that several black people were burned alive in their homes and that, at one-point, black people had to send out of town for more caskets as they had run out.

=== Black flight ===
Many black people fled Springfield during the attacks. They had to escape on foot and hid in corn fields, sometimes getting onto trains, or pleading for refuge with nearby rural families. Mattie Hale recalled her family took people in. Those who returned to Springfield faced increased hostility. Many black people returning had no personal effects except what they managed to carry with them. Many refugees who fled were denied any assistance in neighboring towns, and were turned away with no provisions even after long treks. Refugees who took trains to Jacksonville, Peoria and Sterling, were met by armed police who prevented them from getting off the train. Such rejection brought about more deaths. For example, Lawrence Paine fled Springfield with his wife and three-week-old daughter. After the family was "denied refuge from the elements in the white towns along the route of their march, [the baby] died of exposure."

It is uncertain how many black people permanently left the city due to the attacks. Many newspapers claimed that more 2,000 fled; which might have been likely during the attack and its immediate aftermath. It appears that most black people did return to Springfield, or were replaced by new migrants. Prior to the attacks, Springfield had about 2,700 black people. Two years later, per the 1910 US census, the black population had risen to just under 3,000. Those who did return, and found that they were rendered homeless, sought refuge at the state Arsenal building. At least 400 black people would live in the Arsenal building in the aftermath of the attacks, and some officials feared that "their very presence" would incite a riot. To prevent such incitement, the militiamen kept the doors to the armory closed, brought the residents food prepared by militia cooks, and discouraged them from leaving the building.

=== Property damage ===
The militia quelled the riot on August 15, with nearly 50 homes and 35 businesses left in ruins. There was over $120,000 in property damage "by fire," and over $35,000 filed in personal damages. Adjusted for inflation, in 2024, the total amount equates to about $5 million. However, not included in those estimates was property damage due to vandalism. With costs to transport and feed the state militia, during the violence, the total cost to the state was $265,000.

The family of Scott Barton sued the city for $5,000 (roughly $125,000 in 2018), as did the family of William Donnegan. As lawsuits began mounting up against the city, it refused to pay anything. The city shifted the blame for the attacks and failure to protect its citizens to the state. Springfield filed a lawsuit against the state claiming that the militia failed to stop the attacks. The city ended up denying payment to all claimants seeking damages, with exception to the families of Burton and Donnegan, citing Section 5 of the Illinois Criminal Code, "Suppression of Mob Violence."

=== Racial atmosphere ===
Newspapers were filled with reports of hostility and violence against black people. For example, the same day the Springfield riot began, "Large crowds" were reported waiting outside the jailhouse with "excitement" to lynch a black man accused of assaulting a white woman in Pensacola, Florida. That same night, in Media, Pennsylvania, a black man died by suicide rather than let himself be captured by a mob hunting him. By December 1908, some 88 lynchings had been recorded that year across the country; black people were 95 percent of the victims. Immediately after Ballard's death, newspapers added his death "to the long list of bloody murders which have stained the history of Springfield."

Such violence continued in the aftermath of the riot, further heightening tensions. On August 23, one week after the riot, Thomas Brady, a 70-year-old white man, was murdered in his sleep at his store on East Washington Street, where the riot had been intense. Although Grady's 26-year-old white employee, Frank Bryant, was guilty of the crime, prior to his capture, rumors circulated that Grady had been murdered by a black man. The black population feared becoming targets again of whites on no evidence.

=== Economic effects ===
Following the attacks, Mayor Reece nullified, without explanation, the saloon licenses of six of Springfield's black-owned saloons, forcing their owners and employees to find new sources of income. This also meant that black people were abruptly deprived of casual neighborhood gathering places. Black municipal workers – recognized as "faithful, honest men of long service" – lost their jobs. Mayor Reese laid off all black firemen "for the good of the service," and all black policemen, who he said would no longer be "useful" in their jobs. Reese thought that getting rid of black workers would avoid "trouble" with whites and reduce post-riot tensions.

Black laborers were also threatened with job loss. For example, three coal mines, including Woodside and Tuxhorn, employed approximately 500 men, of which 30 percent were black. Following the attacks, the 350 white miners went to the president of the Springfield United Mine Workers union, refusing to work with black miners, stating that they felt "unsafe" working with black people underground. Because merchants refused to deliver provisions to black people at Camp Lincoln, hesitated to serve black people in town, or overcharged them when they did, the state purchased $10,000 (over $250,000 in 2018) worth of groceries to re-sell to black people so they could have food.

=== Social and political effects ===
Directed to arrest "all suspicious characters," police quickly began arresting black people known to have lost their jobs, or homes in the riot, for "vagrancy"; in some cases police conducted raids of their homes to do so. If unable to pay a $100 ($2,500 in 2018) fine, the black people were given "hours" to leave town.

Six months later, the city held a Centennial Celebration in honor of Lincoln's birthday. It was a "black tie" event held at the State Arsenal Building, featuring prominent American and foreign dignitaries. More than 700 whites attended the $25 ($650 in 2018) per plate event. No African American was invited, although many black people wanted to celebrate Lincoln and his emancipation of slaves.

=== Indictments ===
By August 17, over 200 people had been arrested in connection with the attacks. The State Attorney General, Frank L. Hatch, said that he had evidence to charge "at least 15 people" with murder. Hatch filed a motion for a special jury. At 2:00 p.m., Werner returned to the courthouse with the same 23 men who constituted the special grand jury that indicted Joe James four weeks prior.

By early September, the grand jury, "seeking to place blame for the deaths and the destruction of property", brought 117 indictments against dozens of individuals. In late October, the grand jury brought an additional 32 indictments against mob participants for "malicious mischief," bringing the total of indictments to 149. Approximately 10 percent of the indictments were against black men.

==== Abraham Raymer ====
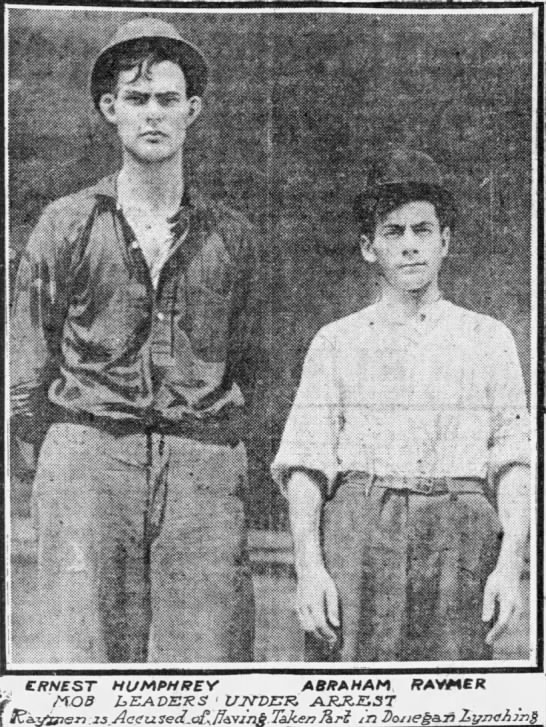
Ernest "Slim" Humphrey (l) and Abraham "Abe" Raymer (r). Chicago Tribune.

Abraham Raymer was indicted on 10 charges. He had arrived in Springfield in February. It was rumored, and reported, that Raymer carried the American flag in the middle of the mob and urged them to attack Donnegan, that he personally slit Donnegan's throat, and that he tried to incite the mob to help him beat the detective, Evan T. Jones, who eventually arrested him. He was arrested at the corner of Fourth and Washington streets, about an hour after Donnegan had been lynched. He was with a mob en route to the gashouse, "looking for negroes living there" in order to lynch them. The mob was thwarted by the state militia.

Several witnesses, including at least five militiamen, testified that they saw Raymer throwing bricks into Loper's restaurant. Raymer was reported as "defiant and boastful" about taking part in the mob; he confessed going to the gashouse, and also confessed to taking part in Donnegan's lynching, admitting that Donnegan was targeted because his wife was white. Raymer provided the names of four other rioters, including Ernest "Slim" Humphrey, who had a long rap sheet for fighting.

Raymer's indictment was the first to be brought before a jury. Raymer's trial for Donnegan's murder had been paused by the judge, who determined that it was "impossible" for any of the attackers to receive a fair trial. The initial jury was purged, and a new jury was assembled of prominent businessmen in the community. Several people admitted to seeing Raymer bend down over Donnegan in the street, and stand back up with blood on his hand, stating their belief that Raymer had slit Donnegan's throat. Others, did not name Raymer but described someone who looked like him: "a short fellow with sleeves rolled up, who talked in broken English, and a 'Jewish' accent."

When Raymer confessed, he insisted that he was not "first leader" of the mob nor had cut Donnegan's throat, attributing that to a man named "Red" Davenport. However, Davenport was never found, and neither known by anyone in Springfield, nor mentioned beyond Raymer's confession. The court instructed the jury to convict Raymer of murder if the evidence demonstrated that he was even a part of the lynch mob. But the all-male jury found Raymer "not guilty" on the first ballot. He was acquitted because the jury believed the defense claim of police brutality, saying that his confession was "sweated out" of him by police. After the verdict was read, Raymer shook the hand of each juror and made a speech thanking them.

Raymer was then tried on lesser counts. Eventually, Raymer was convicted of petty larceny. He was sentenced to 30 days in jail and a $25 fine (about $650 in 2018). Raymer's acquittal of murder, despite the evidence and instruction by the court, was taken to mean that convictions would not be obtained in the remaining trials. Raymer was able to get his murder charge for the lynching of Burton, along with three malicious mischief indictments, stricken from the circuit docket by posting a $3,000 bond (about $75,000 in 2018). On February 11, 1909, a local junk dealer, Abraham Barker, put the money up on Raymer's behalf.

== Fate of Richardson and James ==
=== George Richardson ===
==== Released ====
When Richardson was in jail, expert doctors examined him and concluded that he had "no connection with her [Mabel Hallam] in any way." This was concluded as Mabel Hallam was afflicted with a sexually transmitted infection, born from her alleged rape, of which Richardson "was not affected." After Hallam was made aware of Richardson's medical examination, two weeks after Richardson had been indicted, she recanted her accusation about him and, on September 1, then accused "Ralph Burton," who she alleged to be the 19-year-old son of the lynched, Scott Burton. Hallam stated she was certain young Burton, who was rumored to be in Wichita was her attacker. However, Scott Burton's son, Charles, and wife, Kate, told authorities that Burton had no such son.

With Hallam no longer pressing charges, George Richardson was released from jail without incident. He received no restitution or apology for his time away from work or harm to his name. He went on to work as a janitor, and lived until he was 76, when he died at St. John's Hospital. His obituary did not mention the events of 1908.

==== Mabel Hallam ====
Hallam would again recant her accusation – this time of Burton's alleged son – later admitting that she lied in order to cover up an assault suffered at the hands of her husband after he found out about an affair she was having with another white man, when she began exhibiting symptoms of her STI. To provide an explanation for her battered face, she concocted the story that she was raped by a black man. No charges were filed against her for perjury or for making a false report. Hallam and her husband moved to Chicago shortly after the events. She died in 1921, purportedly of suicide, at the age of 34.

=== Joe James ===
==== Trial ====
Shortly after Richardson was released, Joe James, who, within two days of Ballard's death, had been labeled as "the negro who killed Clergy Ballard," was brought to trial. Many black people in the city feared being attacked again if James was acquitted, packing their personal belongings so they could leave town the moment the jury read its verdict. During his incarceration, he "repeatedly" refused to enter a guilty plea of murder. He initially entered a plea of "not guilty," but his lawyers changed the plea right before the trial began, and entered one of "self defense."

As the trial began, several "Black Hand" letters were sent to Sheriff Werner, and left in the yard of the courthouse, threatening more violence if James was not hanged. The letters included demands such as: "If Joe James don't hang we are going to kill him and run every nigger out of town." An effigy of James was also hanged from a telephone pole at Third and Washington streets, with the message: "Nigger don't let the sun go down on you." The police excused the effigy as "a bit of humor."

Despite such questions and pleas, in a courtroom "crowded to suffocation," the jury convicted James of the premeditated murder of Clergy Ballard. The jury reached its decision with greater "rapidity" than other such murder trials. The entire trial took three days. And despite being too young to receive the death penalty in Illinois, he was sentenced to hang. In the month leading up to his death, James maintained his silence. He read his Bible and refused to speak to reporters, only referring them to his prior statements.

==== Hanging ====
James, described as a "negro boy scarcely of legal age," and who had no money to appeal his sentence, was hanged in the Sangamon County Jail on October 23, 1908, at 10:30 a.m. He was hanged on the city's old gallows, unused since 1898, but refurbished specifically for his death. Nearly 150 spectators witnessed the hanging, including eight sheriffs from nearby counties who were invited as guests of Sheriff Werner. Only two black people were present for James's hanging – James's lawyer and his spiritual adviser.

Before he was hanged, Sheriff Werner asked him if he had anything to say. He responded, "No sir." Two minutes later, Sheriff's Deputy, Fred Long, sprung the trap. It took 11 minutes for James to die. When his body was taken down, the noose was so tight around his neck that it could not be loosened by hand, and had to be cut. Thousands waited in line to view the gallows, with many asking for a piece of the hemp, from the rope that hanged James, as a souvenir. Later, seven thousand people waited in line, outside the undertakers' shop, McCabe & Gaa, to see his body on display. The next day, his mother claimed his body, and took it on a train back to Birmingham.

The day after he was hanged, the Illinois State Journal commented on the importance of James to Springfield:

Springfield will not soon forget Joe James...the youthful Alabama negro has played too important a role on the stage of life in the city to have his name quickly erased from the tablets of memory.

== Cause ==
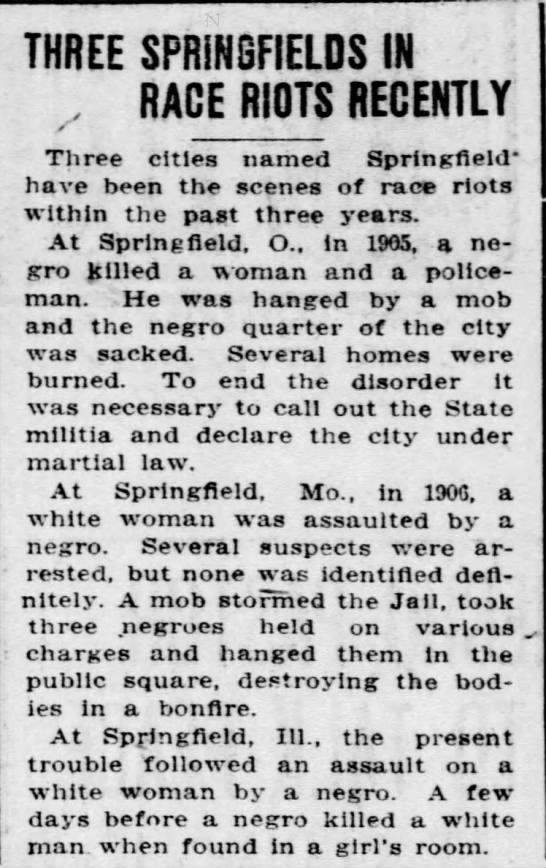
St. Louis Post-Dispatch Aug 15, 1908

Springfield was in many ways an average and typical American city and in a state considered to be a "microcosm of the U.S." (and even its name is the most frequently occurring community name in the U.S., with at least one Springfield found in 25 of the 50 states), so the attacks were an expression of average white American attitudes toward black Americans. The attacks in Springfield were in fact the fourth such attacks to occur in an American Springfield over a four-year period:

- In 1904, in Springfield, Ohio, after a police officer ended up dead following a domestic disturbance, a black man was dragged from his jail cell by a mob and hanged from an electric pole. The mob of 1,500 men then procured combustible waste materials at the railroads and took them to the black Levee neighborhood along the Mad River, where they drove out occupants and set seven building on fire, leaving 150 black people homeless. The police allowed the attack to happen though they had known about it for a full day. Firemen watched the buildings burn, only to save one saloon owned by a white man. The state militia was called in to restore order. The city shut down the remaining black saloons, and all six men indicted for the lynching were acquitted.
- In 1906, again in Springfield, Ohio, after a bar fight left two white men cut and another white man was killed in the railway yards, a white mob began attacking black saloons in the Levee and, "as if by common agreement", black homes. Firefighters' hoses were cut if they tried to save black homes. The state militia, which sympathized with the mob, was slow to report for duty. Attacks continued for three days until the militia finally quelled them. Thirteen buildings of black residents were destroyed.
- In 1906, in Springfield, Missouri, a white woman and her male companion claimed that two masked black men knocked him down, dragged her into a field, and raped her. The next morning, two young black residents with upstanding reputations were arrested. Despite their white employer corroborating their alibi that they had been at work, the woman's male companion reported that the two had stolen his pocket watch. The two black men were arrested. That night, a mob of 1,000 white men stormed the black jail and bludgeoned the black men with sledgehammers. They then dragged their bodies through the streets to city square, hanged them from Gottfried Tower, and built a bonfire out of their bodies in front of a crowd of over 5,000 people. They also killed another black man accused of killing a former Confederate soldier. Local police did not interfere. The next day, Easter Sunday, churchgoers sifted through the ashes for souvenirs of the men. The governor activated the state militia. In the days that followed, drugstores and soda shops sold postcard pictures of the men's corpses, along with medals commemorating the triple lynching. A grand jury later determined the black men were innocent when it was revealed that the white woman and her companion had made up the entire story. Eighteen men, including a policeman, were indicted for lynching. One trial ended in a mistrial, the others were all dismissed.

In the immediate aftermath of the attacks in Springfield (Illinois), many people surmised that the violence was brought on by job competition, alcohol, vice, political corruption, etc. However, over time, and with perspective, historians now agree that such things were palatable excuses and easier to reconcile than the true underlying reasons.

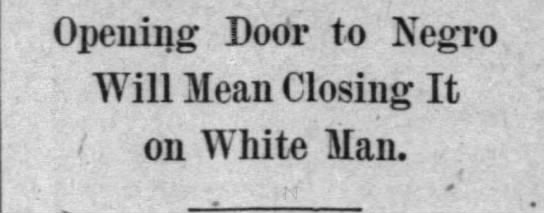
Chicago Tribune. Feb 1903

Today, most historians agree that the attacks were brought about by the "strain" poor whites felt due to not being able to control their political and economic reality. This lack of perceived power was at odds with the idea of white manhood, which in the U.S. has long been synonymous with and bred an expectation of entitlement to dominance of political voting rights, dominance in the economic arena, and dominance as sexual partners and protectors of white women. When wages drop, job stability is threatened, cultural norms are pressed (e.g. increase of immigrant culture, an increased presence of black people or of black people who are financially better off than many whites, etc.), and white women give voice to a sexual threat from an "other", white men perceive a threat to the dominance of their manhood. The perception of any such threat increases the likelihood of violence, while the convergence of such deemed threats is likely to increase the expression of that violence:

The enslavement of one race by another produces necessarily certain moral effects upon both races, moral deterioration of the masters, moral degradation of the slaves. The deeper the degradation of the one, the greater will be the deterioration of the other, and vice versa. Indeed, slavery is a breeding-bed, a sort of compost heap, where the best qualities of both races decay and become food for the worst. The brute appetites and passions of the two act and react on the moral natures of each race with demoralizing effects. The subjection of the will of one race, under such circumstances, to the will of another begets in the race that rules cruelty and tyranny, and in the one that is ruled, fear, cunning and deceit...And there is no help for this so long as the one race rules and the other race is ruled, so long as there exists between them in the state inequality of rights, of conditions, based solely on the racehood of each. – Archibald Grimké, "The Heart of the Race Problem," 1906

Whites who had political and economic power could escape the "torment" of living around those different from themselves, maintaining a social perception of white supremacy. However, those who lacked such economic and political power, were "tormented" by the reality that they were not superior to the black people and immigrants they lived among at all. This created a perception that they were "under siege," and felt compelled to take action to assert and maintain their dominance in the social arena, and punish those who they deemed to have transgressed against them:

[The Levee] has been allowed to exist because of political conditions. No candidates for office have dared to overlook this negro vote...It was the knowledge of this political power and their long immunity which has made the negro unbearable in Springfield. It was this that drove the mob to destroy the entire district. The reign of the negro has ended.

— Chicago Tribune, Editorial, August 18, 1908

Poor immigrants, on the other hand, looking for acceptance as Americans, aligned themselves with the dominant social class through skin color which, in America, superseded nationality, culture and religion.

Black people were easy targets because they were few in number, had no means to fight back and, as an unprotected class of citizens, could be harmed with minimal, if any, repercussions.

Ultimately, Springfield's whites attacked the city's black people simply because they could.

== Legacy ==
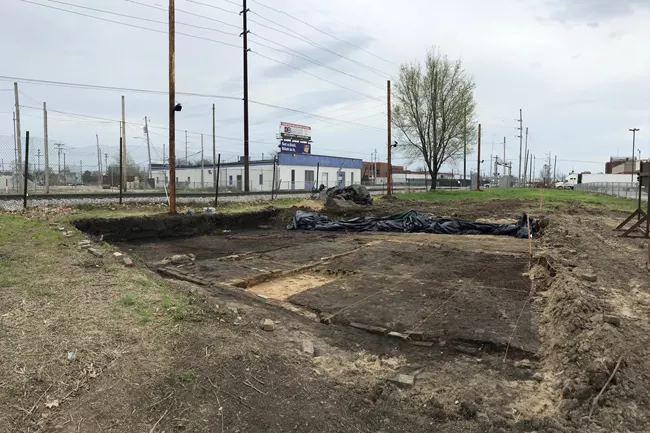
Archaeological site of homes destroyed in the riot, now designated as the Springfield 1908 Race Riot National Monument

=== NAACP creation ===
As a direct result of the attacks, concerned black and white citizens met in New York City to discuss and address racism and white supremacy in the U.S. They formed the National Association for the Advancement of Colored People (NAACP), a civil rights organization, the following February.

=== Commemorations ===
- In May 2008, the Illinois General Assembly formally acknowledged that the event occurred, and gave a copy of that recognition to the local NAACP:

...we recognize this sad chapter in history and realize that from the aftermath comes insight and education, helping us to better deal with racial issues...

- In August 2008, for a centennial commemoration of the attacks, the Citizens Club held a re-enactment of the first murder trial of Abraham Raymer, with the audience acting as jurors, and stimulating discussion about what happened.
- In August 2009, the city of Springfield unveiled two large bronze sculptures at Springfield Union Station depicting the aftermath of the attacks, which were commissioned by the Mayor's 1908 Race Riots Commemoration Commission, created by artist Preston Jackson and dedicated to the victims and the city. The sculptures, titled "Acts of Intolerance," intentionally omitted the portrayal of the lynchings as not to "stir emotions."

=== Sonya Massey ===
Sonya Massey was shot and killed by a sheriff's deputy in Springfield on July 6, 2024, after calling 911 for assistance. The police officer was terminated and charged with first-degree murder. According to Massey's family, one of her ancestors was William Donnegan, who was lynched in the 1908 riots and pronounced dead in the same hospital as Massey. Massey's relative stated: "The more things change, the more they stay the same."

=== National monument ===
In 2024, 116 years after the riot, President Joe Biden signed a proclamation establishing the Springfield 1908 Race Riot National Monument at the site of the attack. The national monument consists of 1.57 acres (0.64 ha) at the site of several homes near Madison Street and the 10th Street Rail Corridor that were destroyed during the riots.

The National Park Service (NPS) had completed a special resource study in 2023 of the archaeological site and 13 associated sites in Springfield and found that the archaeological site met all four criteria for new units of the National Park System. Senators Tammy Duckworth and Dick Durbin and Representative Nikki Budzinski introduced bills to designate the site a national monument.

== See also ==
- False accusation of rape § Justification for lynchings
- Otis B. Duncan
- Wilmington massacre
- List of incidents of civil unrest in the United States
- Tulsa race massacre
- List of national monuments of the United States
