= New Berlin High School =

Location
- 300 E. Ellis St. New Berlin, Illinois 62670; United States; 39.72839°N 89.91233°W

Information
- School type: public secondary
- School district: New Berlin CUSD #16
- Superintendent: Jill Larson
- Principal: Hattle Llewellyn
- Teaching staff: 19.76 (FTE)
- Grades: 9–12
- Gender: coed
- Enrollment: 246 (2023-2024)
- Student to teacher ratio: 12.45
- Campus: Rural
- Colours: Orange, Blue, White
- Athletics conference: Sangamo
- Nickname: Pretzels
- Website: http://www.pretzelpride.com

New Berlin High School is a coeducational public high school serving the community of New Berlin, Illinois and surrounding areas within Sangamon County, including but not limited to: Loami, Berlin, Curran, Island Grove, and the west side of Springfield. It is in the Community Unit School District 16. For the 2021–2022 school year, the school had 278 students enrolled in grades 9–12.

The school's current principal, Hattie Llewellyn; Superintendent, Jill Larson.

== Athletics ==
New Berlin High School's athletic teams are known as the "Pretzels" and compete in thirteen sports and activities sanctioned by the Illinois High School Association. The school has athletic and activities co-op agreements with multiple schools in surrounding communities, including Waverly, Franklin, and Pleasant Plains.

== Academics ==
New Berlin's Quiz Bowl team has achieved state and national recognition among small schools. New Berlin won the small school division at the 2026 NAQT Illinois State Championship and won the Very Small Schools title at the 2026 Small School National Championship Tournament hosted by NAQT.

== Sexual abuse lawsuit ==
In September 2018, a former student filed a civil lawsuit against the school district, alleging sexual abuse over a period of four years in the late 1980s by a former teacher at the school.
