= New Berlin, Illinois =

New Berlin
- Village
- Location of New Berlin in Sangamon County, Illinois.
- Coordinates: 39°43′33″N 89°54′52″W
- Country: United States
- State: Illinois
- County: Sangamon

Area
  - Total: 1.13 sq mi (2.93 km^{2})
  - Land: 1.13 sq mi (2.93 km^{2})
  - Water: 0 sq mi (0.00 km^{2})
- Elevation: 653 ft (199 m)

Population (2020)
  - Total: 1,381
  - Density: 1,222.7/sq mi (472.07/km^{2})
- Time zone: UTC-6 (CST)
  - Summer (DST): UTC-5 (CDT)
- ZIP code: 62670
- Area code: 217
- FIPS code: 17-52168
- GNIS feature ID: 2399456
- Website: www.newberlin.il.us

New Berlin (German: Neues Berlin) is a village in Sangamon County, Illinois, United States. As of the 2020 census, New Berlin had a population of 1,381. It is part of the Springfield Metropolitan Statistical Area. New Berlin is home to CUSD #16, New Berlin High School.

== History ==
The Potawatomi Trail of Death passed through here in 1838.

The village was founded in 1865 by a community of mostly German immigrants. Only a very few buildings from the original village still remain on the town's main thoroughfare, old Illinois State Route 54.

== Geography ==
According to the 2010 census, New Berlin has a total area of 1.14 square miles (2.95 km^{2}), all land.

== Demographics ==
Historical population
Census	Pop.	Note	%±
1880	403		—
1890	494		22.6%
1900	533		7.9%
1910	690		29.5%
1920	687		−0.4%
1930	661		−3.8%
1940	631		−4.5%
1950	622		−1.4%
1960	627		0.8%
1970	754		20.3%
1980	834		10.6%
1990	797		−4.4%
2000	1,030		29.2%
2010	1,346		30.7%
2020	1,381		2.6%
U.S. Decennial Census

=== 2020 census ===
As of the 2020 census, New Berlin had a population of 1,381. The median age was 35.9 years. 28.2% of residents were under the age of 18 and 14.2% of residents were 65 years of age or older. For every 100 females there were 99.0 males, and for every 100 females age 18 and over there were 90.4 males age 18 and over.

0.0% of residents lived in urban areas, while 100.0% lived in rural areas.

There were 540 households in New Berlin, of which 40.2% had children under the age of 18 living in them. Of all households, 51.7% were married-couple households, 15.6% were households with a male householder and no spouse or partner present, and 25.9% were households with a female householder and no spouse or partner present. About 26.5% of all households were made up of individuals and 12.4% had someone living alone who was 65 years of age or older.

There were 573 housing units, of which 5.8% were vacant. The homeowner vacancy rate was 2.3% and the rental vacancy rate was 8.1%.

Racial composition as of the 2020 census
Race	Number	Percent
White	1,295	93.8%
Black or African American	9	0.7%
American Indian and Alaska Native	1	0.1%
Asian	5	0.4%
Native Hawaiian and Other Pacific Islander	1	0.1%
Some other race	6	0.4%
Two or more races	64	4.6%
Hispanic or Latino (of any race)	12	0.9%

=== 2000 census ===
As of the 2000 census, there were 1,030 people, 428 households, and 296 families residing in the village. The population density was 929.3 inhabitants per square mile (358.8/km^{2}). There were 459 housing units at an average density of 414.1 per square mile (159.9/km^{2}). The racial makeup of the village was 98.35% White, 0.39% African American, 0.19% Native American, 0.68% from other races, and 0.39% from two or more races. Hispanic or Latino of any race were 0.68% of the population.

There were 428 households, out of which 32.7% had children under the age of 18 living with them, 58.4% were married couples living together, 8.2% had a female householder with no husband present, and 30.8% were non-families. 28.5% of all households were made up of individuals, and 11.9% had someone living alone who was 65 years of age or older. The average household size was 2.41 and the average family size was 2.94.

In the village, the population was spread out, with 25.3% under the age of 18, 7.1% from 18 to 24, 31.6% from 25 to 44, 21.5% from 45 to 64, and 14.6% who were 65 years of age or older. The median age was 36 years. For every 100 females, there were 90.7 males. For every 100 females age 18 and over, there were 90.3 males.

The median income for a household in the village was $41,635, and the median income for a family was $50,139. Males had a median income of $35,417 versus $22,614 for females. The per capita income for the village was $19,313. About 4.0% of families and 5.8% of the population were below the poverty line, including 8.5% of those under age 18 and 7.6% of those age 65 or over.

== Culture ==
The village is the site of the annual Sangamon County Fair, which is typically held starting on the Wednesday before Father's Day weekend in June.

=== Sites of interest ===
- New Berlin Area Veterans Memorial - Dedicated July 6, 2013.
- Sangamon County Fairgrounds

On July 17th, 2015, New Berlin couple Ashley King and Joel Burger got married in the first Burger King fast food chain sponsored wedding.
