= List of precincts in Illinois =

Illinois precincts
- Map of the 255 precincts in the 17 counties in Illinois that do not have townships.
- Category: Lower-level administrative division
- Location: Illinois

Of the 102 counties in the state of Illinois, 17 are divided into minor civil divisions known as precincts. The 255 such precincts in Illinois are listed below. The remaining 85 counties are divided into 1,426 townships.

Unlike electoral precincts, these precincts are not necessarily restricted to a single electoral district. Instead, they serve as administrative divisions of county government.

== Illinois precincts by name ==
Counties lacking township government

=== A ===
- Adkins Precinct, Massac County
- Albion No. 1 Precinct, Edwards County
- Albion No. 2 Precinct, Edwards County
- Albion No. 3 Precinct, Edwards County
- Alexander Precinct, Morgan County
- Alsey Precinct, Scott County
- Alto Pass Precinct, Union County
- America Precinct, Pulaski County
- Anna District 1 Precinct, Union County
- Anna District 2 Precinct, Union County
- Anna District 3 Precinct, Union County
- Anna District 4 Precinct, Union County
- Anna District 5 Precinct, Union County
- Anna District 6 Precinct, Union County
- Anna District 7 Precinct, Union County
- Arcadia Precinct, Morgan County
- Athens North No. 2 Precinct, Menard County
- Athens South No. 1 Precinct, Menard County
- Atterberry No. 10 Precinct, Menard County

=== B ===
- Balcom Precinct, Union County
- Baldwin Precinct, Randolph County
- Beaucoup Precinct, Perry County
- Belknap Precinct, Johnson County
- Belleview Precinct, Calhoun County
- Bellmont Precinct, Wabash County
- Benton Precinct, Massac County
- Blair Precinct, Randolph County
- Blairsville Precinct, Williamson County
- Bloomfield Precinct, Johnson County
- Bloomfield Precinct, Scott County
- Bone Gap Precinct, Edwards County
- Bremen Precinct, Randolph County
- Brewerville Precinct, Randolph County
- Browns Precinct, Edwards County
- Burnside Precinct, Johnson County

=== C ===
- Cache Precinct, Alexander County
- Cache Precinct, Johnson County
- Cairo Precinct, Alexander County
- Carlin Precinct, Calhoun County
- Carterville Precinct, Williamson County
- Cave-In-Rock Precinct, Hardin County
- Central Precinct, Randolph County
- Chapin Precinct, Morgan County
- Chester Precinct, Randolph County
- Cobden District 1 Precinct, Union County
- Cobden District 2 Precinct, Union County
- Coffee Precinct, Wabash County
- Compton Precinct, Wabash County
- Concord Precinct, Morgan County
- Corinth Precinct, Williamson County
- Coulterville Precinct, Randolph County
- Crab Orchard Precinct, Williamson County
- Crater Precinct, Calhoun County
- Creal Springs Precinct, Williamson County
- Cutler Precinct, Perry County

=== D ===
- Dixon Precinct, Edwards County
- Dongola District 1 Precinct, Union County
- Dongola District 2 Precinct, Union County
- Du Quoin No. 1 Precinct, Perry County
- Du Quoin No. 2 Precinct, Perry County
- Du Quoin No. 3 Precinct, Perry County
- Du Quoin No. 4 Precinct, Perry County
- Du Quoin No. 5 Precinct, Perry County
- Du Quoin No. 6 Precinct, Perry County
- Du Quoin No. 7 Precinct, Perry County
- Du Quoin No. 8 Precinct, Perry County
- Du Quoin No. 9 Precinct, Perry County
- Du Quoin No. 10 Precinct, Perry County
- Du Quoin No. 11 Precinct, Perry County
- Du Quoin No. 12 Precinct, Perry County

=== E ===
- East Brooklyn Precinct, Massac County
- East Marion Precinct, Williamson County
- East Rosiclare Precinct, Hardin County
- Eddyville No. 6 Precinct, Pope County
- Ellery Precinct, Edwards County
- Ellis Grove Precinct, Randolph County
- Elvira Precinct, Johnson County
- Evansville Precinct, Randolph County
- Exeter-Bluffs Precinct, Scott County

=== F ===
- Fancy Prairie No. 3 Precinct, Menard County
- Franklin Precinct, Massac County
- Franklin Precinct, Morgan County
- French Creek Precinct, Edwards County
- Friendsville Precinct, Wabash County

=== G ===
- Georges Creek Precinct, Massac County
- Gilead Precinct, Calhoun County
- Glasgow Precinct, Scott County
- Golconda No. 1 Precinct, Pope County
- Golconda No. 2 Precinct, Pope County
- Golconda No. 3 Precinct, Pope County
- Goreville No. 1 Precinct, Johnson County
- Goreville No. 2 Precinct, Johnson County
- Grand Chain Precinct, Pulaski County
- Grant Precinct, Massac County
- Grantsburg No. 1 Precinct, Johnson County
- Grantsburg No. 2 Precinct, Johnson County
- Grassy Precinct, Williamson County
- Greenview No. 6 Precinct, Menard County

=== H ===
- Hamburg Precinct, Calhoun County
- Hardin Precinct, Calhoun County
- Herrin Precinct, Williamson County
- Hillerman Precinct, Massac County

=== I ===
- Indian Creek No. 7 Precinct, Menard County
- Irish Grove No. 4 Precinct, Menard County

=== J ===
- Jackson Precinct, Massac County
- Jacksonville No. 1 Precinct, Morgan County
- Jacksonville No. 2 Precinct, Morgan County
- Jacksonville No. 3 Precinct, Morgan County
- Jacksonville No. 4 Precinct, Morgan County
- Jacksonville No. 5 Precinct, Morgan County
- Jacksonville No. 6 Precinct, Morgan County
- Jacksonville No. 7 Precinct, Morgan County
- Jacksonville No. 8 Precinct, Morgan County
- Jacksonville No. 9 Precinct, Morgan County
- Jacksonville No. 10 Precinct, Morgan County
- Jacksonville No. 11 Precinct, Morgan County
- Jacksonville No. 12 Precinct, Morgan County
- Jacksonville No. 13 Precinct, Morgan County
- Jacksonville No. 14 Precinct, Morgan County
- Jacksonville No. 15 Precinct, Morgan County
- Jacksonville No. 16 Precinct, Morgan County
- Jacksonville No. 17 Precinct, Morgan County
- Jacksonville No. 18 Precinct, Morgan County
- Jefferson No. 4 Precinct, Pope County
- Jefferson Precinct, Massac County
- Jonesboro District 1 Precinct, Union County
- Jonesboro District 2 Precinct, Union County
- Jonesboro District 3 Precinct, Union County

=== K ===
- Karnak Precinct, Pulaski County
- Kaskaskia Precinct, Randolph County

=== L ===
- Lake Creek Precinct, Williamson County
- Lake No. 1 Precinct, Johnson County
- Lake No. 2 Precinct, Johnson County
- Lancaster Precinct, Wabash County
- Lick Creek Precinct, Union County
- Lick Prairie Precinct, Wabash County
- Lincoln Precinct, Massac County
- Literberry Precinct, Morgan County
- Logan Precinct, Massac County
- Lynnville Precinct, Morgan County

=== M ===
- Manchester Precinct, Scott County
- Markham Precinct, Morgan County
- McClure Precinct, Alexander County
- McFarlan Precinct, Hardin County
- Meredosia No. 1 Precinct, Morgan County
- Meredosia No. 2 Precinct, Morgan County
- Merritt Precinct, Scott County
- Metropolis No. 1 Precinct, Massac County
- Metropolis No. 2 Precinct, Massac County
- Metropolis No. 3 Precinct, Massac County
- Metropolis No. 4 Precinct, Massac County
- Mill Creek Precinct, Union County
- Monroe Precinct, Hardin County
- Mound City Precinct, Pulaski County
- Mounds Precinct, Pulaski County
- Mount Carmel Precinct, Wabash County
- Murrayville Precinct, Morgan County

=== N ===
- Naples-Bluffs Precinct, Scott County
- Nortonville Precinct, Morgan County

=== O ===
- Oakford No. 9 Precinct, Menard County
- Olive Branch Precinct, Alexander County
- Olmsted Precinct, Pulaski County
- Ozark Precinct, Johnson County

=== P ===
- Palestine Precinct, Randolph County
- Percy Precinct, Randolph County
- Perks Precinct, Pulaski County
- Petersburg East No. 13 Precinct, Menard County
- Petersburg North No. 14 Precinct, Menard County
- Petersburg South No. 15 Precinct, Menard County
- Petersburg West No. 16 Precinct, Menard County
- Pinckneyville No. 1 Precinct, Perry County
- Pinckneyville No. 2 Precinct, Perry County
- Pinckneyville No. 3 Precinct, Perry County
- Pinckneyville No. 4 Precinct, Perry County
- Pinckneyville No. 5 Precinct, Perry County
- Pinckneyville No. 6 Precinct, Perry County
- Pinckneyville No. 7 Precinct, Perry County
- Pinckneyville No. 8 Precinct, Perry County
- Pisgah Precinct, Morgan County
- Point Precinct, Calhoun County
- Prairie du Rocher Precinct, Randolph County
- Precinct 1, Monroe County
- Precinct 2, Monroe County
- Precinct 3, Monroe County
- Precinct 4, Monroe County
- Precinct 5, Monroe County
- Precinct 6, Monroe County
- Precinct 7, Monroe County
- Precinct 8, Monroe County
- Precinct 9, Monroe County
- Precinct 10, Monroe County
- Precinct 11, Monroe County
- Precinct 12, Monroe County
- Precinct 13, Monroe County
- Precinct 15, Monroe County
- Precinct 16, Monroe County
- Precinct 17, Monroe County
- Precinct 18, Monroe County
- Precinct 19, Monroe County
- Precinct 20, Monroe County
- Precinct 21, Monroe County
- Precinct 22, Monroe County
- Precinct 23, Monroe County
- Precinct 24, Monroe County
- Precinct 25, Monroe County
- Precinct 26, Monroe County
- Precinct 27, Monroe County
- Precinct 28, Monroe County
- Precinct 29, Monroe County
- Precinct 30, Monroe County
- Precinct 31, Monroe County
- Precinct 32, Monroe County
- Precinct 33, Monroe County
- Precinct 34, Monroe County
- Precinct 35, Monroe County
- Precinct 36, Monroe County
- Precinct 37, Monroe County
- Prentice-Sinclair Precinct, Morgan County
- Pulaski Precinct, Pulaski County

=== R ===
- Red Bud Precinct, Randolph County
- Richwood Precinct, Calhoun County
- Rock Creek No. 12 Precinct, Menard County
- Rock Precinct, Hardin County
- Rockwood Precinct, Randolph County
- Ruma Precinct, Randolph County

=== S ===
- Salem No. 1 Precinct, Edwards County
- Salem No. 2 Precinct, Edwards County
- Sandridge No. 8 Precinct, Menard County
- Sandusky Precinct, Alexander County
- Saratoga Precinct, Union County
- Shelby No. 1 Precinct, Edwards County
- Shelby No. 2 Precinct, Edwards County
- Simpson Precinct, Johnson County
- South Jacksonville No. 1 Precinct, Morgan County
- South Jacksonville No. 2 Precinct, Morgan County
- South Jacksonville No. 3 Precinct, Morgan County
- South Jacksonville No. 4 Precinct, Morgan County
- Southern Precinct, Williamson County
- Sparta Precinct, Randolph County
- Steeleville Precinct, Randolph County
- Stokes Precinct, Union County
- Stone Church Precinct, Hardin County
- Stonefort Precinct, Williamson County
- Sugar Grove No. 5 Precinct, Menard County
- Sunfield Precinct, Perry County
- Swanwick Precinct, Perry County

=== T ===
- Tallula No. 11 Precinct, Menard County
- Tamaroa No. 1 Precinct, Perry County
- Tamaroa No. 2 Precinct, Perry County
- Tamms Precinct, Alexander County
- Thebes Precinct, Alexander County
- Tilden Precinct, Randolph County
- Tunnel Hill Precinct, Johnson County

=== U ===
- Ullin Precinct, Pulaski County
- Union Precinct, Union County

=== V ===
- Vienna No. 1 Precinct, Johnson County
- Vienna No. 2 Precinct, Johnson County
- Vienna No. 3 Precinct, Johnson County
- Villa Ridge Precinct, Pulaski County

=== W ===
- Wabash Precinct, Wabash County
- Walsh Precinct, Randolph County
- Washington Precinct, Massac County
- Waverly No. 1 Precinct, Morgan County
- Waverly No. 2 Precinct, Morgan County
- Waverly No. 3 Precinct, Morgan County
- Webster No. 5 Precinct, Pope County
- West Brooklyn Precinct, Massac County
- West Marion Precinct, Williamson County
- West Rosiclare Precinct, Hardin County
- Wetaug Precinct, Pulaski County
- Willisville Precinct, Perry County
- Winchester No. 1 Precinct, Scott County
- Winchester No. 2 Precinct, Scott County
- Winchester No. 3 Precinct, Scott County
- Wine Hill Precinct, Randolph County
- Woodson Precinct, Morgan County

== Illinois precincts by county ==
=== Alexander County ===
- Cache Precinct
- Cairo Precinct
- McClure Precinct
- Olive Branch Precinct
- Sandusky Precinct
- Tamms Precinct
- Thebes Precinct

=== Calhoun County ===
- Belleview Precinct
- Carlin Precinct
- Crater Precinct
- Gilead Precinct
- Hamburg Precinct
- Hardin Precinct
- Point Precinct
- Richwood Precinct

=== Edwards County ===
- Albion No. 1 Precinct
- Albion No. 2 Precinct
- Albion No. 3 Precinct
- Bone Gap Precinct
- Browns Precinct
- Dixon Precinct
- Ellery Precinct
- French Creek Precinct
- Salem No. 1 Precinct
- Salem No. 2 Precinct
- Shelby No. 1 Precinct
- Shelby No. 2 Precinct

=== Hardin County ===
- Cave-In-Rock Precinct
- East Rosiclare Precinct
- McFarlan Precinct
- Monroe Precinct
- Rock Precinct
- Stone Church Precinct
- West Rosiclare Precinct

=== Johnson County ===
- Belknap Precinct
- Bloomfield Precinct
- Burnside Precinct
- Cache Precinct
- Elvira Precinct
- Goreville No. 1 Precinct
- Goreville No. 2 Precinct
- Grantsburg No. 1 Precinct
- Grantsburg No. 2 Precinct
- Lake No. 1 Precinct
- Lake No. 2 Precinct
- Ozark Precinct
- Simpson Precinct
- Tunnel Hill Precinct
- Vienna No. 1 Precinct
- Vienna No. 2 Precinct
- Vienna No. 3 Precinct

=== Massac County ===
- Adkins Precinct
- Benton Precinct
- East Brooklyn Precinct
- Franklin Precinct
- Georges Creek Precinct
- Grant Precinct
- Hillerman Precinct
- Jackson Precinct
- Jefferson Precinct
- Lincoln Precinct
- Logan Precinct
- Metropolis No. 1 Precinct
- Metropolis No. 2 Precinct
- Metropolis No. 3 Precinct
- Metropolis No. 4 Precinct
- Washington Precinct
- West Brooklyn Precinct

=== Menard County ===
- Athens North No. 2 Precinct
- Athens South No. 1 Precinct
- Atterberry No. 10 Precinct
- Fancy Prairie No. 3 Precinct
- Greenview No. 6 Precinct
- Indian Creek No. 7 Precinct
- Irish Grove No. 4 Precinct
- Oakford No. 9 Precinct
- Petersburg East No. 13 Precinct
- Petersburg North No. 14 Precinct
- Petersburg South No. 15 Precinct
- Petersburg West No. 16 Precinct
- Rock Creek No. 12 Precinct
- Sandridge No. 8 Precinct
- Sugar Grove No. 5 Precinct
- Tallula No. 11 Precinct

=== Monroe County ===
- Precinct 1
- Precinct 2
- Precinct 3
- Precinct 4
- Precinct 5
- Precinct 6
- Precinct 7
- Precinct 8
- Precinct 9
- Precinct 10
- Precinct 11
- Precinct 12
- Precinct 13
- Precinct 15
- Precinct 16
- Precinct 17
- Precinct 18
- Precinct 19
- Precinct 20
- Precinct 21
- Precinct 22
- Precinct 23
- Precinct 24
- Precinct 25
- Precinct 26
- Precinct 27
- Precinct 28
- Precinct 29
- Precinct 30
- Precinct 31
- Precinct 32
- Precinct 33
- Precinct 34
- Precinct 35
- Precinct 36
- Precinct 37

=== Morgan County ===
- Alexander Precinct
- Arcadia Precinct
- Chapin Precinct
- Concord Precinct
- Franklin Precinct
- Jacksonville No. 1 Precinct
- Jacksonville No. 2 Precinct
- Jacksonville No. 3 Precinct
- Jacksonville No. 4 Precinct
- Jacksonville No. 5 Precinct
- Jacksonville No. 6 Precinct
- Jacksonville No. 7 Precinct
- Jacksonville No. 8 Precinct
- Jacksonville No. 9 Precinct
- Jacksonville No. 10 Precinct
- Jacksonville No. 11 Precinct
- Jacksonville No. 12 Precinct
- Jacksonville No. 13 Precinct
- Jacksonville No. 14 Precinct
- Jacksonville No. 15 Precinct
- Jacksonville No. 16 Precinct
- Jacksonville No. 17 Precinct
- Jacksonville No. 18 Precinct
- Literberry Precinct
- Lynnville Precinct
- Markham Precinct
- Meredosia No. 1 Precinct
- Meredosia No. 2 Precinct
- Murrayville Precinct
- Nortonville Precinct
- Pisgah Precinct
- Prentice-Sinclair Precinct
- South Jacksonville No. 1 Precinct
- South Jacksonville No. 2 Precinct
- South Jacksonville No. 3 Precinct
- South Jacksonville No. 4 Precinct
- Waverly No. 1 Precinct
- Waverly No. 2 Precinct
- Waverly No. 3 Precinct
- Woodson Precinct

=== Perry County ===
- Beaucoup Precinct
- Cutler Precinct
- Du Quoin No. 1 Precinct
- Du Quoin No. 2 Precinct
- Du Quoin No. 3 Precinct
- Du Quoin No. 4 Precinct
- Du Quoin No. 5 Precinct
- Du Quoin No. 6 Precinct
- Du Quoin No. 7 Precinct
- Du Quoin No. 8 Precinct
- Du Quoin No. 9 Precinct
- Du Quoin No. 10 Precinct
- Du Quoin No. 11 Precinct
- Du Quoin No. 12 Precinct
- Pinckneyville No. 1 Precinct
- Pinckneyville No. 2 Precinct
- Pinckneyville No. 3 Precinct
- Pinckneyville No. 4 Precinct
- Pinckneyville No. 5 Precinct
- Pinckneyville No. 6 Precinct
- Pinckneyville No. 7 Precinct
- Pinckneyville No. 8 Precinct
- Sunfield Precinct
- Swanwick Precinct
- Tamaroa No. 1 Precinct
- Tamaroa No. 2 Precinct
- Willisville Precinct

=== Pope County ===
- Eddyville No. 6 Precinct
- Golconda No. 1 Precinct
- Golconda No. 2 Precinct
- Golconda No. 3 Precinct
- Jefferson No. 4 Precinct
- Webster No. 5 Precinct

=== Pulaski County ===
- America Precinct
- Grand Chain Precinct
- Karnak Precinct
- Mound City Precinct
- Mounds Precinct
- Olmsted Precinct
- Perks Precinct
- Pulaski Precinct
- Ullin Precinct
- Villa Ridge Precinct
- Wetaug Precinct

=== Randolph County ===
- Baldwin Precinct
- Blair Precinct
- Bremen Precinct
- Brewerville Precinct
- Central Precinct
- Chester Precinct
- Coulterville Precinct
- Ellis Grove Precinct
- Evansville Precinct
- Kaskaskia Precinct
- Palestine Precinct
- Percy Precinct
- Prairie du Rocher Precinct
- Red Bud Precinct
- Rockwood Precinct
- Ruma Precinct
- Sparta Precinct
- Steeleville Precinct
- Tilden Precinct
- Walsh Precinct
- Wine Hill Precinct

=== Scott County ===
- Alsey Precinct
- Bloomfield Precinct
- Exeter-Bluffs Precinct
- Glasgow Precinct
- Manchester Precinct
- Merritt Precinct
- Naples-Bluffs Precinct
- Winchester No. 1 Precinct
- Winchester No. 2 Precinct
- Winchester No. 3 Precinct

=== Union County ===
- Alto Pass Precinct
- Anna District 1 Precinct
- Anna District 2 Precinct
- Anna District 3 Precinct
- Anna District 4 Precinct
- Anna District 5 Precinct
- Anna District 6 Precinct
- Anna District 7 Precinct
- Balcom Precinct
- Cobden District 1 Precinct
- Cobden District 2 Precinct
- Dongola District 1 Precinct
- Dongola District 2 Precinct
- Jonesboro District 1 Precinct
- Jonesboro District 2 Precinct
- Jonesboro District 3 Precinct
- Lick Creek Precinct
- Mill Creek Precinct
- Saratoga Precinct
- Stokes Precinct
- Union Precinct

=== Wabash County ===
- Bellmont Precinct
- Coffee Precinct
- Compton Precinct
- Friendsville Precinct
- Lancaster Precinct
- Lick Prairie Precinct
- Mount Carmel Precinct
- Wabash Precinct

=== Williamson County ===
- Blairsville Precinct
- Carterville Precinct
- Corinth Precinct
- Crab Orchard Precinct
- Creal Springs Precinct
- East Marion Precinct
- Grassy Precinct
- Herrin Precinct
- Lake Creek Precinct
- Southern Precinct
- Stonefort Precinct
- West Marion Precinct

== See also ==
- List of counties in Illinois
- List of townships in Illinois
