= Albion Precinct, Edwards County, Illinois =

Coordinates: 38°22′47″N 88°04′26″W

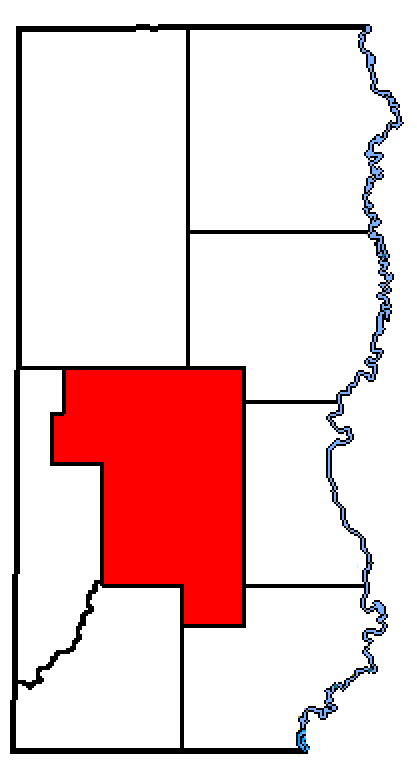
Albion Precinct

The Albion Precinct was a precinct in Edwards County, Illinois. It was home to Albion, Illinois, the county's seat. Albion Precinct was split up into Albion No. 1 Precinct, Albion No. 2 Precinct, and Albion No. 3 Precinct.
