= Greenview, Illinois =

- Village
- Location in Menard County, Illinois
- Coordinates: 40°05′00″N 89°44′46″W
- Country: United States
- State: Illinois
- County: Menard
- Township: Greenview No. 6 Precinct

Area
  - Total: 0.86 sq mi (2.23 km^{2})
  - Land: 0.86 sq mi (2.23 km^{2})
  - Water: 0 sq mi (0.00 km^{2})
- Elevation: 538 ft (164 m)

Population (2020)
  - Total: 745
  - Density: 867.2/sq mi (334.82/km^{2})
- Time zone: UTC-6 (CST)
  - Summer (DST): UTC-5 (CDT)
- ZIP code: 62642
- Area code: 217
- FIPS code: 17-31576
- GNIS feature ID: 2398205
- Website: thevillageofgreenview.com

Greenview is a village in Menard County, Illinois, United States. The population was 745 at the 2020 census. It is part of the Springfield, Illinois Metropolitan Statistical Area.

== History ==
Greenview was laid out in October 1857 by Menard County pioneer Willian Engle, on land originally owned by Charles Montgomery in section 23 of township 19 north, range 6 west of the Third Principal Meridian. It was named after William G. Greene of nearby Tallula Precinct, because he convinced the railroad to come through the town: located on the Chicago, Alton & St. Louis Railroad, Greenview was incorporated by a special act of the Illinois General Assembly on May 6, 1869, then re-incorporated under the new general municipal laws of the state on March 7, 1877.

== Geography ==
Greenview is located in northeastern Menard County. Illinois Route 29 passes through the east side of the village, leading north 9 miles (14 km) to Mason City and south the same distance to Athens. Springfield, the state capital, is 23 miles (37 km) to the south via IL 29, and Petersburg, the Menard county seat, is 10 miles (16 km) to the southwest via local roads.

According to the U.S. Census Bureau, Greenview has a total area of 0.86 square miles (2.23 km^{2}), all land. Grove Creek passes through the east side of the village, flowing north toward Salt Creek and the Sangamon River, part of the Illinois River watershed.

== Demographics ==
Historical population
Census	Pop.	Note	%±
1870	373		—
1880	450		20.6%
1890	1,106		145.8%
1900	1,019		−7.9%
1910	921		−9.6%
1920	755		−18.0%
1930	720		−4.6%
1940	749		4.0%
1950	795		6.1%
1960	796		0.1%
1970	740		−7.0%
1980	830		12.2%
1990	848		2.2%
2000	862		1.7%
2010	778		−9.7%
2020	745		−4.2%
U.S. Decennial Census

As of the census of 2000, there were 862 people, 366 households, and 252 families residing in the village. The population density was 1,014.2 inhabitants per square mile (391.6/km^{2}). There were 397 housing units at an average density of 467.1 per square mile (180.3/km^{2}). The racial makeup of the village was 99.65% White, 0.12% African American, 0.12% Native American and 0.12% Asian. Hispanic or Latino of any race were 0.12% of the population.

There were 366 households, out of which 31.4% had children under the age of 18 living with them, 52.7% were married couples living together, 12.0% had a female householder with no husband present, and 31.1% were non-families. 29.5% of all households were made up of individuals, and 16.1% had someone living alone who was 65 years of age or older. The average household size was 2.36 and the average family size was 2.89.

In the village, the population was spread out, with 24.4% under the age of 18, 9.4% from 18 to 24, 26.3% from 25 to 44, 22.0% from 45 to 64, and 17.9% who were 65 years of age or older. The median age was 37 years. For every 100 females, there were 95.0 males. For every 100 females age 18 and over, there were 89.5 males.

The median income for a household in the village was $39,196, and the median income for a family was $49,125. Males had a median income of $30,455 versus $24,583 for females. The per capita income for the village was $21,050. About 4.0% of families and 7.5% of the population were below the poverty line, including 13.7% of those under age 18 and 7.1% of those age 65 or over.
