= Belleview, Illinois =

- Unincorporated community
- Location within Illinois Location within the United States
- Coordinates: 39°21′03″N 90°46′52″W
- Country: United States
- State: Illinois
- County: Calhoun
- Precinct: Belleview
- Elevation: 469 ft (143 m)
- Time zone: UTC-6 (Central (CST))
  - Summer (DST): UTC-5 (CDT)
- ZIP code: 62355
- Area codes: 618/730
- GNIS feature ID: 422453

Belleview is an unincorporated community in Belleview Precinct, Calhoun County, Illinois, United States. Belleview is located on Illinois Route 96 south of Pleasant Hill.
