= Belleview Precinct, Calhoun County, Illinois =

Coordinates: 39°21′46″N 90°46′27″W

Belleview Precinct
- Precinct
- Location in Calhoun County
- Country: United States
- State: Illinois
- County: Calhoun

Area
  - Total: 60.32 sq mi (156.22 km^{2})
  - Land: 55.4 sq mi (143.5 km^{2})
  - Water: 4.90 sq mi (12.68 km^{2})

Population (2020)
  - Total: 227
  - Density: 4.10/sq mi (1.58/km^{2})
- Time zone: UTC-6 (CST)
  - Summer (DST): UTC-5 (CDT)
- ZIP codes: 62045, 62053, 62355
- Area codes: 618/730
- FIPS code: 17-011-90360
- GNIS feature ID: 1928445

Belleview Precinct is located in Calhoun County, Illinois. The population was 227 at the 2020 census, down from 283 at the 2010 census, and it contained 144 housing units.

Until 1834, the territory comprising the current precincts of Carlin, Crater, and Hamburg was part of Belleview Precinct. In 1834, Illinois Precinct was formed (which was subsequently divided in Carlin and Carter Precincts), and in 1848, Hamburg was formed, leaving Belleview Precinct to its current borders.

== Geography ==
According to the 2021 census gazetteer files, Belleview Precinct has a total area of 60.40 square miles (156.44 km^{2}), of which 55.50 square miles (143.74 km^{2}) (or 91.88%) is land and 4.91 square miles (12.72 km^{2}) (or 8.12%) is water.

=== Unincorporated community ===
- Belleview

== Demographics ==
Historical population
Census	Pop.	Note	%±
2000	286		—
2010	283		−1.0%
2020	227		−19.8%

As of the 2020 census there were 227 people, 81 households, and 58 families residing in the precinct. The population density was 3.76 inhabitants per square mile (1.45/km^{2}). There were 144 housing units at an average density of 2.38 per square mile (0.92/km^{2}). The racial makeup of the precinct was 96.04% White, 0.00% African American, 0.44% Native American, 0.00% Asian, 0.00% Pacific Islander, 0.00% from other races, and 3.52% from two or more races. Hispanic or Latino of any race were 0.88% of the population.

There were 81 households, out of which 14.80% had children under the age of 18 living with them, 64.20% were married couples living together, 4.94% had a female householder with no spouse present, and 28.40% were non-families. 28.40% of all households were made up of individuals, and 23.50% had someone living alone who was 65 years of age or older. The average household size was 3.10 and the average family size was 3.86.

The precinct's age distribution consisted of 6.8% under the age of 18, 4.0% from 18 to 24, 34.7% from 25 to 44, 21.9% from 45 to 64, and 32.7% who were 65 years of age or older. The median age was 55.2 years. For every 100 females, there were 143.7 males. For every 100 females age 18 and over, there were 154.3 males.

The median income for a household in the precinct was $74,688, and the median income for a family was $81,667. Males had a median income of $45,938 versus $41,563 for females. The per capita income for the precinct was $27,715. About 6.9% of families and 8.4% of the population were below the poverty line, including 35.3% of those under age 18 and 6.1% of those age 65 or over.
