= Blair Precinct, Randolph County, Illinois =

Blair Precinct
- Location in Randolph County
- Coordinates: 38°02′39″N 089°44′33″W
- Country: United States
- State: Illinois
- County: Randolph

Area
  - Total: 17.52 sq mi (45.38 km^{2})
  - Land: 17.44 sq mi (45.18 km^{2})
  - Water: 0.077 sq mi (0.20 km^{2}) 0.004%
- Elevation: 512 ft (156 m)

Population (2000)
  - Total: 290
  - Density: 16.6/sq mi (6.42/km^{2})
- GNIS feature ID: 1928447

Blair Precinct was a district of Randolph County, Illinois, USA. As of the 2000 census, its population was 290. As of the 2010 census, it had been split between Central Precinct and Palestine Precinct.

== Geography ==
Blair Precinct covered an area of 45.38 square kilometres (17.52 mi^{2}).
