= Bremen, Illinois =

Bremen, Illinois may refer to:

- Bremen, Jo Daviess County, Illinois, an unincorporated community
- Bremen, Randolph County, Illinois, an unincorporated community
- Bremen Township, Cook County, Illinois
- Bremen Precinct, Randolph County, Illinois
