= Oakford =

Oakford is the name of several locations:

Australia

- Oakford, Western Australia, a suburb of Perth
- Electoral district of Oakford, an electorate of the Western Australian Legislative Assembly

United Kingdom

- Oakford, Ceredigion, a village in Wales
- Oakford, Devon, a village in England

United States

- Oakford, Illinois
- Oakford, Indiana
- Oakford, Pennsylvania
- Oakford Park (Tampa), Florida, a neighborhood
- Oakford Park, a former amusement park in Jeannette, Pennsylvania
- Oakford Precinct, Menard County, Illinois
