= East Rosiclare Precinct, Hardin County, Illinois =

East Rosiclare Precinct
- Interactive map of East Rosiclare Precinct
- Coordinates: 37°26′14″N 088°20′05″W
- Country: United States
- State: Illinois
- County: Hardin

Area
  - Total: 1.47 sq mi (3.80 km^{2})
  - Land: 1.39 sq mi (3.60 km^{2})
  - Water: 0.077 sq mi (0.20 km^{2}) 5.25%
- Elevation: 361 ft (110 m)

Population (2000)
  - Total: 823
  - Density: 560/sq mi (216.4/km^{2})
- GNIS feature ID: 1928488

East Rosiclare Precinct is a former minor civil division which was located in Hardin County, Illinois, USA. As of the 2000 census, its population was 823. It was replaced by Rosiclare Precinct in 2007.

== Geography ==
East Rosiclare Precinct covers an area of 3.80 km^{2} (1.47 sq mi).
