= Carlin Precinct, Calhoun County, Illinois =

Carlin Precinct
- Precinct
- Location in Calhoun County
- Coordinates: 39°21′11″N 090°39′12″W
- Country: United States
- State: Illinois
- County: Calhoun
- Organized: 1834

Area
  - Total: 23.36 sq mi (60.51 km^{2})
  - Land: 22.73 sq mi (58.88 km^{2})
  - Water: 0.63 sq mi (1.64 km^{2}) 2.71%
- Elevation: 617 ft (188 m)

Population (2020)
  - Total: 92
  - Density: 4.0/sq mi (1.6/km^{2})
- Time zone: UTC-6 (CST)
  - Summer (DST): UTC-5 (CDT)
- ZIP code: 62053
- Area codes: 618/730
- FIPS code: 17-013-90630
- GNIS feature ID: 1928458

Carlin Precinct is located in Calhoun County, Illinois. The population was 92 at the 2020 census, a decline from 138 at the 2010 census.

The precinct was formed in 1834 from Belleview Precinct as part of Illinois Precinct (comprising modern-day Carlin and Crater Precincts) and was separated in 1839.

== Geography ==
According to the 2021 census gazetteer files, Carlin Precinct has a total area of 23.29 square miles (60.32 km^{2}), of which 22.66 square miles (58.69 km^{2}) (or 97.32%) is land and 0.62 square miles (1.61 km^{2}) (or 2.68%) is water. It contains no incorporated settlements.

== Demographics ==
Historical population
| Census | Pop. | Note | %± |
|---|---|---|---|
| 2000 | 197 | | — |
| 2010 | 138 | | −29.9% |
| 2020 | 92 | | −33.3% |

As of the 2020 census there were 92 people, 24 households, and 13 families residing in the precinct. The population density was 3.95 inhabitants per square mile (1.53/km^{2}). There were 83 housing units at an average density of 3.56 per square mile (1.37/km^{2}). The racial makeup of the precinct was 95.65% White, 0.00% African American, 0.00% Native American, 0.00% Asian, 0.00% Pacific Islander, 0.00% from other races, and 4.35% from two or more races. Hispanic or Latino of any race were 2.17% of the population.

There were 24 households, out of which 0.00% had children under the age of 18 living with them, 54.17% were married couples living together, none had a female householder with no spouse present, and 45.83% were non-families. 45.80% of all households were made up of individuals, and 45.80% had someone living alone who was 65 years of age or older. The average household size was 1.46 and the average family size was 1.85.

100% of the precinct's population was 65 years of age or older. The median age was 66.6 years. For every 100 females, there were 59.1 males. For every 100 females age 18 and over, there were 59.1 males.

The median income for a household in the precinct was $77,727, and the per capita income for the precinct was $43,037.
