= West Rosiclare Precinct, Hardin County, Illinois =

West Rosiclare Precinct
- Interactive map of West Rosiclare Precinct
- Coordinates: 37°25′26″N 088°21′59″W
- Country: United States
- State: Illinois
- County: Hardin

Area
  - Total: 5.42 sq mi (14.03 km^{2})
  - Land: 5.01 sq mi (12.98 km^{2})
  - Water: 0.40 sq mi (1.04 km^{2}) 7.45%
- Elevation: 420 ft (130 m)

Population (2000)
  - Total: 460
  - Density: 85/sq mi (32.8/km^{2})
- GNIS feature ID: 1928677

West Rosiclare Precinct is a former minor civil division which was located in Hardin County, Illinois, USA. As of the 2000 census, its population was 460. It was replaced by Rosiclare Precinct in 2007.

== Geography ==
West Rosiclare Precinct covers an area of 14.03 square kilometres (5.42 mi^{2}).
