= Coulterville Precinct, Randolph County, Illinois =

Coulterville Precinct
- Location in Randolph County
- Coordinates: 38°10′27″N 089°37′11″W
- Country: United States
- State: Illinois
- County: Randolph

Area
  - Total: 21.13 sq mi (54.73 km^{2})
  - Land: 20.79 sq mi (53.84 km^{2})
  - Water: 0.34 sq mi (0.88 km^{2}) 1.61%
- Elevation: 531 ft (162 m)

Population (2010)
  - Total: 1,418
  - Density: 68.21/sq mi (26.34/km^{2})
- GNIS feature ID: 1928468

Coulterville Precinct is located in Randolph County, Illinois, USA. As of the 2010 census, its population was 1,418.

== Geography ==
Coulterville Precinct covers an area of 54.73 square kilometres (21.13 mi^{2}).
