= Shelby No. 1 Precinct, Edwards County, Illinois =

Shelby No. 1
- Election Precinct
- Shelby No. 1 Precinct, Edwards County, Illinois (Illinois)
- Interactive map of Shelby No. 1
- Coordinates: 38°31′34″N 88°06′12″W
- Country: United States
- State: Illinois
- County: Edwards

Area
  - Total: 24.62 sq mi (63.8 km^{2})
  - Land: 24.61 sq mi (63.7 km^{2})
  - Water: 0.01 sq mi (0.026 km^{2})
- Elevation: 456 ft (139 m)

Population (2020)
  - Total: 303
  - Density: 12.3/sq mi (4.75/km^{2})
- FIPS code: 17-047-93153
- GNIS feature ID: 1928645

Shelby No. 1 Precinct is one of the 12 precincts of Edwards County, Illinois. As of the 2020 census, the population was 303.

== Geography ==
According to the 2021 census gazetteer files, Shelby No. 1 Precinct has a total area of 24.62 square miles (63.77 km^{2}), of which 24.61 square miles (63.74 km^{2}) (or 99.96%) is land and 0.01 square miles (0.03 km^{2}) (or 0.04%) is water.

== Demographics ==
As of the 2020 census there were 303 people, 79 households, and 46 families residing in the precinct. The population density was 12.31 inhabitants per square mile (4.75/km^{2}). There were 145 housing units at an average density of 5.89 per square mile (2.27/km^{2}). The racial makeup of the precinct was 99.01% White, 0.00% African American, 0.00% Native American, 0.33% Asian, 0.00% Pacific Islander, 0.00% from other races, and 0.66% from two or more races. Hispanic or Latino of any race were 0.33% of the population.

There were 79 households, out of which 32.90% had children under the age of 18 living with them, 58.23% were married couples living together, none had a female householder with no spouse present, and 41.77% were non-families. 25.30% of all households were made up of individuals, and 19.00% had someone living alone who was 65 years of age or older. The average household size was 2.22 and the average family size was 2.83.

The precinct's age distribution consisted of 17.1% under the age of 18, 14.3% from 18 to 24, 30.9% from 25 to 44, 29.1% from 45 to 64, and 8.6% who were 65 years of age or older. The median age was 39.2 years. For every 100 females, there were 124.4 males. For every 100 females age 18 and over, there were 126.6 males.

The median income for a household in the precinct was $77,292, and the median income for a family was $88,750. Males had a median income of $33,750 versus $48,214 for females. The per capita income for the precinct was $34,927. None of the population was below the poverty line.
