= Evansville Precinct, Randolph County, Illinois =

Evansville Precinct
- Location in Randolph County
- Coordinates: 38°05′20″N 089°55′58″W
- Country: United States
- State: Illinois
- County: Randolph

Area
  - Total: 23.0 sq mi (59.6 km^{2})
  - Land: 22.2 sq mi (57.5 km^{2})
  - Water: 0.81 sq mi (2.1 km^{2}) 3.52%
- Elevation: 443 ft (135 m)

Population (2010)
  - Total: 1,015
  - Density: 45.7/sq mi (17.7/km^{2})
- GNIS feature ID: 1928494

Evansville Precinct is located in Randolph County, Illinois, USA. As of the 2010 census, its population was 1,015.

== Geography ==
Evansville Precinct covers an area of 23.0 square miles (59.6 km^{2}).
