= Petersburg South No. 15 Precinct, Menard County, Illinois =

Coordinates: 39°59′40″N 89°53′51″W

Petersburg South No. 15 Precinct
- Precinct
- Petersburg South Precinct, Menard County, Illinois
- Country: United States
- State: Illinois
- County: Menard

Area
  - Total: 12.38 sq mi (32.07 km^{2})
  - Land: 12.03 sq mi (31.16 km^{2})
  - Water: 0.35 sq mi (0.91 km^{2}) 2.8%

Population (2000)
  - Total: 997
  - Density: 81/sq mi (31.1/km^{2})
- Time zone: UTC-6 (CST)
  - Summer (DST): UTC-5 (CDT)

Petersburg South No. 15 Precinct is located in Menard County, Illinois, United States. The population was 997 at the 2000 census.
