= McFarlan Precinct, Hardin County, Illinois =

McFarlan Precinct
- Location in Hardin County

- Hardin County's Location in Illinois
- Coordinates: 37°28′41″N 088°15′34″W
- Country: United States
- State: Illinois
- County: Hardin

Area
  - Total: 24.35 sq mi (63.1 km^{2})
  - Land: 24.04 sq mi (62.3 km^{2})
  - Water: 0.31 sq mi (0.80 km^{2}) 1.28%
- Elevation: 571 ft (174 m)

Population (2020)
  - Total: 527
  - Density: 21.9/sq mi (8.46/km^{2})
- GNIS feature ID: 1928564
- FIPS code: 17-069-91998

McFarlan Precinct is located in Hardin County, Illinois, USA. As of the 2020 census, its population was 527.

== Geography ==
According to the 2021 census gazetteer files, McFarlan Precinct has a total area of 24.35 square miles (63.07 km^{2}), of which 24.04 square miles (62.26 km^{2}) (or 98.72%) is land and 0.31 square miles (0.80 km^{2}) (or 1.28%) is water.

== Demographics ==
Historical population
Census	Pop.	Note	%±
1990	815		—
2000	721		−11.5%
2010	703		−2.5%
2020	527		−25.0%

As of the 2020 census there were 527 people, 322 households, and 136 families residing in the precinct. The population density was 21.64 inhabitants per square mile (8.36/km^{2}). There were 350 housing units at an average density of 14.37 per square mile (5.55/km^{2}). The racial makeup of the precinct was 92.98% White, 0.19% African American, 0.00% Native American, 0.19% Asian, 0.00% Pacific Islander, 1.52% from other races, and 5.12% from two or more races. Hispanic or Latino of any race were 1.90% of the population.

There were 322 households, out of which 20.80% had children under the age of 18 living with them, 36.65% were married couples living together, 3.11% had a female householder with no spouse present, and 57.76% were non-families. 56.50% of all households were made up of individuals, and 31.40% had someone living alone who was 65 years of age or older. The average household size was 1.94 and the average family size was 3.18.

The precinct's age distribution consisted of 21.2% under the age of 18, 9.7% from 18 to 24, 14.2% from 25 to 44, 23.4% from 45 to 64, and 31.5% who were 65 years of age or older. The median age was 50.7 years. For every 100 females, there were 121.8 males. For every 100 females age 18 and over, there were 113.7 males.

The median income for a household in the precinct was $38,125, and the median income for a family was $71,250. Males had a median income of $31,563 versus $30,000 for females. The per capita income for the precinct was $21,736. About 11.8% of families and 24.8% of the population were below the poverty line, including 22.7% of those under age 18 and 12.1% of those age 65 or over.
