= Atterberry No. 10 Precinct, Menard County, Illinois =

Atterberry No. 10 Precinct
- Location in Menard County
- Coordinates: 40°02′48″N 089°56′40″W
- Country: United States
- State: Illinois
- County: Menard

Area
  - Total: 21.92 sq mi (56.77 km^{2})
  - Land: 21.92 sq mi (56.77 km^{2})
  - Water: 0 sq mi (0 km^{2}) 0%
- Elevation: 600 ft (183 m)

Population (2000)
  - Total: 194
  - Density: 8.8/sq mi (3.4/km^{2})
- GNIS feature ID: 1928440

Atterberry No. 10 Precinct is located in Menard County, Illinois. The population was 194 at the 2000 census.
