= Golconda No. 2 Precinct, Pope County, Illinois =

Golconda No. 2 Precinct
- Interactive map of Golconda No. 2 Precinct
- Coordinates: 37°28′33″N 088°28′49″W
- Country: United States
- State: Illinois
- County: Pope

Area
  - Total: 88.29 sq mi (228.66 km^{2})
  - Land: 87.95 sq mi (227.79 km^{2})
  - Water: 0.34 sq mi (0.87 km^{2}) 0.38%
- Elevation: 548 ft (167 m)

Population (2000)
  - Total: 1,005
  - Density: 11/sq mi (4.4/km^{2})
- GNIS feature ID: 1928505

Golconda No. 2 Precinct is located in Pope County, Illinois, USA. As of the 2000 census, its population was 1,005.

== Geography ==
Golconda No. 2 Precinct covers an area of 228.66 square kilometres (88.29 mi^{2}).
