= Athens North No. 2 Precinct, Menard County, Illinois =

Athens North No. 2 Precinct
- Location in Menard County
- Coordinates: 39°58′59″N 089°43′16″W
- Country: United States
- State: Illinois
- County: Menard

Area
  - Total: 18.47 sq mi (47.85 km^{2})
  - Land: 18.40 sq mi (47.66 km^{2})
  - Water: 0.073 sq mi (0.19 km^{2}) 0.4%
- Elevation: 610 ft (186 m)

Population (2000)
  - Total: 1,954
  - Density: 110/sq mi (41/km^{2})
- GNIS feature ID: 1928438

Athens North No. 2 Precinct is located in Menard County, Illinois. The population was 1,954 at the 2000 census.
