= Ruma Precinct, Randolph County, Illinois =

Ruma Precinct
- Location in Randolph County
- Coordinates: 38°07′11″N 089°59′33″W
- Country: United States
- State: Illinois
- County: Randolph

Area
  - Total: 22.84 sq mi (59.16 km^{2})
  - Land: 22.82 sq mi (59.11 km^{2})
  - Water: 0.019 sq mi (0.05 km^{2}) 0.1%
- Elevation: 492 ft (150 m)

Population (2010)
  - Total: 817
  - Density: 35.8/sq mi (13.8/km^{2})
- GNIS feature ID: 1928637

Ruma Precinct is located in Randolph County, Illinois, USA. As of the 2010 census, its population was 817.

The median age range of people here were 36.2. In terms of race and ethnicity, majority of the people were Whites, which counted about 95%. There were also other races such as Hispanics which counted nearly as 3% and others as 1%. There were around 261 households, and in each house there were around 2.9 persons. In terms of marital status, it was seen that 67% were married. The education level of the people were good. 25.7% of the people had bachelor's degree or higher.

== Geography ==
Ruma Precinct covers an area of 59.16 square kilometres (22.84 mi^{2}).
