= Indian Creek No. 7 Precinct, Menard County, Illinois =

Coordinates: 40°04′52″N 89°47′12″W

Indian Creek No. 7 Precinct
- Precinct
- Indian Creek Precinct, Menard County, Illinois
- Country: United States
- State: Illinois
- County: Menard

Area
  - Total: 25.63 sq mi (66.39 km^{2})
  - Land: 25.53 sq mi (66.11 km^{2})
  - Water: 0.11 sq mi (0.29 km^{2}) 0.4%

Population (2000)
  - Total: 278
- Time zone: UTC-6 (CST)
  - Summer (DST): UTC-5 (CDT)

Indian Creek No. 7 Precinct is located in Menard County, Illinois. The population was 278 at the 2000 census.
