= Salem No. 1 Precinct, Edwards County, Illinois =

Salem No. 1
- Election Precinct
- Salem No. 1 Precinct, Edwards County, Illinois (Illinois)
- Interactive map of Salem No. 1
- Coordinates: 38°31′31″N 87°58′42″W
- Country: United States
- State: Illinois
- County: Edwards

Area
  - Total: 18.11 sq mi (46.9 km^{2})
  - Land: 18.11 sq mi (46.9 km^{2})
  - Water: 0.00 sq mi (0 km^{2})
- Elevation: 413 ft (126 m)

Population (2020)
  - Total: 546
  - Density: 30.1/sq mi (11.6/km^{2})
- FIPS code: 17-047-93081
- GNIS feature ID: 1928639

Salem No. 1 Precinct is one of the 12 precincts of Edwards County, Illinois. As of the 2020 census, the population was 546.

== Geography ==
According to the 2021 census gazetteer files, Salem No. 1 Precinct has a total area of 18.11 square miles (46.90 km^{2}), all land.

== Demographics ==
As of the 2020 census there were 546 people, 251 households, and 191 families residing in the precinct. The population density was 30.15 inhabitants per square mile (11.64/km^{2}). There were 251 housing units at an average density of 13.86 per square mile (5.35/km^{2}). The racial makeup of the precinct was 97.25% White, 0.00% African American, 0.92% Native American, 0.00% Asian, 0.00% Pacific Islander, 0.37% from other races, and 1.47% from two or more races. Hispanic or Latino of any race were 1.10% of the population.

There were 251 households, out of which 32.70% had children under the age of 18 living with them, 70.52% were married couples living together, 2.79% had a female householder with no spouse present, and 23.90% were non-families. 16.70% of all households were made up of individuals, and 7.60% had someone living alone who was 65 years of age or older. The average household size was 2.60 and the average family size was 2.88.

The precinct's age distribution consisted of 22.2% under the age of 18, 7.4% from 18 to 24, 15.9% from 25 to 44, 37.1% from 45 to 64, and 17.5% who were 65 years of age or older. The median age was 47.1 years. For every 100 females, there were 107.3 males. For every 100 females age 18 and over, there were 109.9 males.

The median income for a household in the precinct was $55,625, and the median income for a family was $73,250. Males had a median income of $52,159 versus $18,661 for females. The per capita income for the precinct was $27,193. About 1.6% of families and 5.8% of the population were below the poverty line, including 6.1% of those under age 18 and none of those age 65 or over.
