= Baldwin Precinct, Randolph County, Illinois =

Baldwin Precinct
- Location in Randolph County
- Coordinates: 38°10′48″N 089°49′56″W
- Country: United States
- State: Illinois
- County: Randolph

Area
  - Total: 42.91 sq mi (111.14 km^{2})
  - Land: 39.89 sq mi (103.31 km^{2})
  - Water: 3.02 sq mi (7.83 km^{2}) 7.05%
- Elevation: 449 ft (137 m)

Population (2010)
  - Total: 879
  - Density: 22.0/sq mi (8.51/km^{2})
- GNIS feature ID: 1928442

Baldwin Precinct is located in Randolph County, Illinois, USA. As of the 2010 census, its population was 879.

== Geography ==
Baldwin Precinct covers an area of 42.91 square miles (111.1 km^{2}) and contains no incorporated settlements.
