= Petersburg East No. 13 Precinct, Menard County, Illinois =

Coordinates: 40°00′01″N 89°48′04″W

Petersburg East No. 13 Precinct
- Precinct
- Petersburg East Precinct, Menard County, Illinois
- Country: United States
- State: Illinois
- County: Menard

Area
  - Total: 22.96 sq mi (59.46 km^{2})
  - Land: 22.87 sq mi (59.23 km^{2})
  - Water: 0.089 sq mi (0.23 km^{2}) 0.4%

Population (2000)
  - Total: 1,311
- Time zone: UTC-6 (CST)
  - Summer (DST): UTC-5 (CDT)

Petersburg East No. 13 Precinct is located in Menard County, Illinois. The population was 1,311 at the 2000 census.
