= Rock Creek No. 12 Precinct, Menard County, Illinois =

Coordinates: 39°56′02″N 89°49′24″W

Rock Creek No. 12 Precinct
- Precinct
- Rock Creek Precinct, Menard County, Illinois
- Country: United States
- State: Illinois
- County: Menard

Area
  - Total: 23.60 sq mi (61.12 km^{2})
  - Land: 23.58 sq mi (61.08 km^{2})
  - Water: 0.015 sq mi (0.04 km^{2}) 0.07%

Population (2000)
  - Total: 796
- Time zone: UTC-6 (CST)
  - Summer (DST): UTC-5 (CDT)

Rock Creek No. 12 Precinct is located in Menard County, Illinois. The population was 796 at the 2000 census.
