= Rockwood Precinct, Randolph County, Illinois =

Rockwood Precinct
- Location in Randolph County
- Coordinates: 37°52′02″N 089°41′55″W
- Country: United States
- State: Illinois
- County: Randolph

Area
  - Total: 28.43 sq mi (73.63 km^{2})
  - Land: 26.58 sq mi (68.84 km^{2})
  - Water: 1.85 sq mi (4.79 km^{2}) 6.5%
- Elevation: 535 ft (163 m)

Population (2010)
  - Total: 270
  - Density: 10/sq mi (3.9/km^{2})
- GNIS feature ID: 1928636

Rockwood Precinct is located in Randolph County, Illinois, USA. As of the 2010 census, its population was 270.

== Geography ==
Rockwood Precinct covers an area of 73.63 square kilometres (28.43 mi^{2}).
