= Hardin Precinct, Calhoun County, Illinois =

Hardin Precinct
- Township
- Location in Calhoun County
- Coordinates: 39°09′01″N 90°37′36″W
- Country: United States
- State: Illinois
- County: Calhoun

Area
  - Total: 24.71 sq mi (64.0 km^{2})
  - Land: 23.03 sq mi (59.6 km^{2})
  - Water: 1.68 sq mi (4.4 km^{2})
- Elevation: 499 ft (152 m)

Population (2020)
  - Total: 1,170
  - Density: 50.8/sq mi (19.6/km^{2})
- FIPS code: 17-013-91602
- GNIS feature ID: 1928515

Hardin Precinct is located in Calhoun County, Illinois. The population was 1,170 at the 2020 census, a decrease from 1,330 at the 2010 census.

== Geography ==
According to the 2021 census gazetteer files, Hardin Precinct has a total area of 24.71 square miles (64.00 km^{2}), of which 23.03 square miles (59.65 km^{2}) (or 93.21%) is land and 1.68 square miles (4.35 km^{2}) (or 6.79%) is water.

== Demographics ==
Historical population
Census	Pop.	Note	%±
2000	1,308		—
2010	1,330		1.7%
2020	1,170		−12.0%

As of the 2020 census there were 1,170 people, 394 households, and 283 families residing in the precinct. The population density was 47.35 inhabitants per square mile (18.28/km^{2}). There were 519 housing units at an average density of 21.00 per square mile (8.11/km^{2}). The racial makeup of the precinct was 95.81% White, 0.09% African American, 0.09% Native American, 0.43% Asian, 0.00% Pacific Islander, 1.03% from other races, and 2.56% from two or more races. Hispanic or Latino of any race were 1.28% of the population.

There were 394 households, out of which 28.90% had children under the age of 18 living with them, 65.74% were married couples living together, 3.55% had a female householder with no spouse present, and 28.17% were non-families. 21.10% of all households were made up of individuals, and 8.90% had someone living alone who was 65 years of age or older. The average household size was 3.18 and the average family size was 3.70.

The precinct's age distribution consisted of 25.3% under the age of 18, 6.8% from 18 to 24, 18.4% from 25 to 44, 29.8% from 45 to 64, and 19.7% who were 65 years of age or older. The median age was 44.2 years. For every 100 females, there were 91.0 males. For every 100 females age 18 and over, there were 88.5 males.

The median income for a household in the precinct was $72,679, and the median income for a family was $79,671. Males had a median income of $50,694 versus $35,132 for females. The per capita income for the precinct was $25,022. About 10.2% of families and 14.1% of the population were below the poverty line, including 12.4% of those under age 18 and 5.5% of those age 65 or over.
