= Percy Precinct, Randolph County, Illinois =

Percy Precinct
- Location in Randolph County
- Coordinates: 38°01′03″N 089°37′00″W
- Country: United States
- State: Illinois
- County: Randolph

Area
  - Total: 19.14 sq mi (49.58 km^{2})
  - Land: 18.70 sq mi (48.44 km^{2})
  - Water: 0.44 sq mi (1.15 km^{2}) 2.3%
- Elevation: 486 ft (148 m)

Population (2010)
  - Total: 1,223
  - Density: 65.39/sq mi (25.25/km^{2})
- GNIS feature ID: 1928587

Percy Precinct is located in Randolph County, Illinois, United States. At the 2010 census, its population was 1,223.

== Geography ==
Percy Precinct covers an area of 49.58 square kilometres (19.14 mi^{2}).
