= Brewerville Precinct, Randolph County, Illinois =

Brewerville Precinct
- Location in Randolph County
- Coordinates: 38°01′13″N 090°00′23″W
- Country: United States
- State: Illinois
- County: Randolph

Area
  - Total: 41.74 sq mi (108.10 km^{2})
  - Land: 38.66 sq mi (100.14 km^{2})
  - Water: 3.07 sq mi (7.96 km^{2}) 7.36%
- Elevation: 377 ft (115 m)

Population (2010)
  - Total: 285
  - Density: 7.37/sq mi (2.85/km^{2})
- GNIS feature ID: 1928452

Brewerville Precinct is located in Randolph County, Illinois, USA. According to the 2010 census, its population was 285.

== Geography ==
Brewerville Precinct covers an area of 108.10 square kilometres (41.74 mi^{2}).
