= French Creek Precinct, Edwards County, Illinois =

French Creek
- Election Precinct
- Interactive map of French Creek
- Coordinates: 38°18′22″N 88°00′43″W
- Country: United States
- State: Illinois
- County: Edwards

Area
  - Total: 26.18 sq mi (67.8 km^{2})
  - Land: 26.15 sq mi (67.7 km^{2})
  - Water: 0.03 sq mi (0.078 km^{2})
- Elevation: 423 ft (129 m)

Population (2020)
  - Total: 922
  - Density: 35.3/sq mi (13.6/km^{2})
- FIPS code: 17-047-91296
- GNIS feature ID: 1928499

French Creek Precinct is one of the 12 precincts of Edwards County, Illinois. The precinct seat is Grayville. As of the 2020 census, the population was 922.

== Geography ==
According to the 2021 census gazetteer files, French Creek Precinct has a total area of 26.18 square miles (67.81 km^{2}), of which 26.15 square miles (67.73 km^{2}) (or 99.90%) is land and 0.03 square miles (0.08 km^{2}) (or 0.10%) is water.

== Demographics ==
As of the 2020 census there were 922 people, 401 households, and 230 families residing in the precinct. The population density was 35.22 inhabitants per square mile (13.60/km^{2}). There were 480 housing units at an average density of 18.34 per square mile (7.08/km^{2}). The racial makeup of the precinct was 96.20% White, 0.43% African American, 0.00% Native American, 0.00% Asian, 0.22% Pacific Islander, 0.43% from other races, and 2.71% from two or more races. Hispanic or Latino of any race were 1.52% of the population.

There were 401 households, out of which 27.20% had children under the age of 18 living with them, 50.37% were married couples living together, 6.23% had a female householder with no spouse present, and 42.64% were non-families. 31.70% of all households were made up of individuals, and 16.70% had someone living alone who was 65 years of age or older. The average household size was 2.22 and the average family size was 2.90.

The precinct's age distribution consisted of 22.2% under the age of 18, 2.9% from 18 to 24, 23.2% from 25 to 44, 27.6% from 45 to 64, and 24.1% who were 65 years of age or older. The median age was 45.3 years. For every 100 females, there were 106.3 males. For every 100 females age 18 and over, there were 99.7 males.

The median income for a household in the precinct was $44,958, and the median income for a family was $78,125. Males had a median income of $33,542 versus $26,563 for females. The per capita income for the precinct was $25,943. About 1.3% of families and 15.4% of the population were below the poverty line, including 9.5% of those under age 18 and 19.5% of those age 65 or over.
