= Browns Precinct, Edwards County, Illinois =

Browns
- Election Precinct
- Browns Precinct, Edwards County, Illinois (Illinois)
- Interactive map of Browns
- Coordinates: 38°22′12″N 87°59′49″W
- Country: United States
- State: Illinois
- County: Edwards

Area
  - Total: 15.77 sq mi (40.8 km^{2})
  - Land: 15.77 sq mi (40.8 km^{2})
  - Water: 0.00 sq mi (0 km^{2})
- Elevation: 397 ft (121 m)

Population (2020)
  - Total: 324
  - Density: 20.5/sq mi (7.93/km^{2})
- FIPS code: 17-047-90540
- GNIS feature ID: 1928453

Browns is an election precinct, or township equivalent, in Edwards County, Illinois. As of the 2020 Census the population was 324.

== Geography ==
According to the 2021 census gazetteer files, Browns Precinct has a total area of 15.77 square miles (40.84 km^{2}), all land.

== Demographics ==
As of the 2020 census there were 324 people, 165 households, and 93 families residing in the precinct. The population density was 20.55 inhabitants per square mile (7.93/km^{2}). There were 149 housing units at an average density of 9.45 per square mile (3.65/km^{2}). The racial makeup of the precinct was 98.46% White, 0.31% African American, 0.00% Native American, 0.00% Asian, 0.00% Pacific Islander, 0.31% from other races, and 0.93% from two or more races. Hispanic or Latino of any race were 1.23% of the population.

There were 165 households, out of which 18.80% had children under the age of 18 living with them, 43.03% were married couples living together, 3.03% had a female householder with no spouse present, and 43.64% were non-families. 35.20% of all households were made up of individuals, and 25.50% had someone living alone who was 65 years of age or older. The average household size was 2.19 and the average family size was 2.89.

The precinct's age distribution consisted of 19.3% under the age of 18, 6.9% from 18 to 24, 14.4% from 25 to 44, 39.5% from 45 to 64, and 19.9% who were 65 years of age or older. The median age was 51.0 years. For every 100 females, there were 104.5 males. For every 100 females age 18 and over, there were 104.2 males.

The median income for a household in the precinct was $60,625, and the median income for a family was $71,563. Males had a median income of $45,563 versus $24,375 for females. The per capita income for the precinct was $29,091. About 3.2% of families and 11.9% of the population were below the poverty line, including 7.1% of those under age 18 and 11.1% of those age 65 or over.
