= Jefferson No. 4 Precinct, Pope County, Illinois =

Jefferson No. 4 Precinct
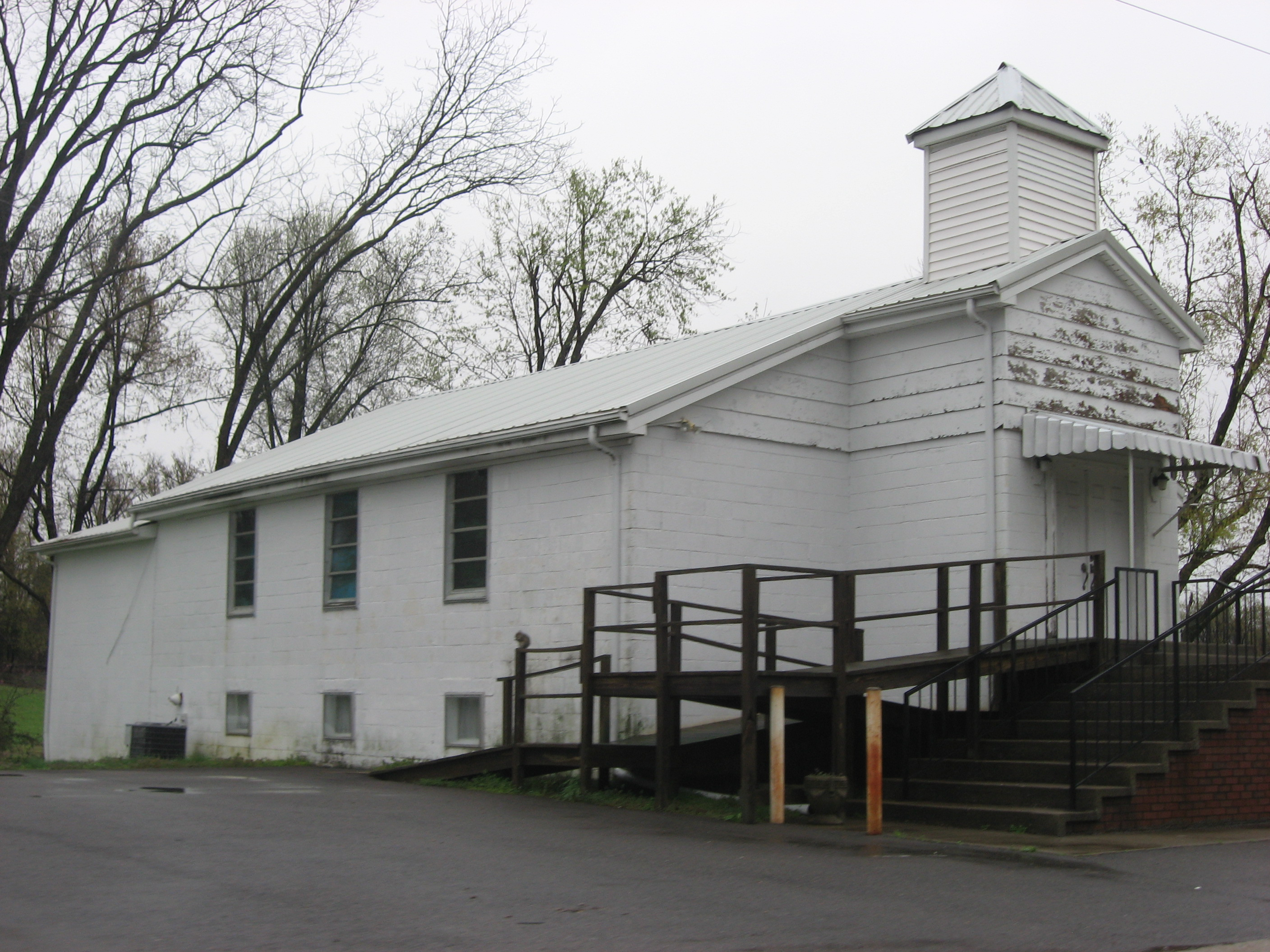
- Calvary Missionary Baptist Church at New Liberty
- Interactive map of Jefferson No. 4 Precinct
- Coordinates: 37°12′36″N 088°30′39″W
- Country: United States
- State: Illinois
- County: Pope

Area
  - Total: 70.46 sq mi (182.48 km^{2})
  - Land: 68.74 sq mi (178.03 km^{2})
  - Water: 1.72 sq mi (4.45 km^{2}) 2.44%
- Elevation: 531 ft (162 m)

Population (2000)
  - Total: 448
  - Density: 6.4/sq mi (2.46/km^{2})
- GNIS feature ID: 1928546

Jefferson No. 4 Precinct is located in Pope County, Illinois, USA. As of the 2000 census, its population was 448.

== Geography ==
Jefferson No. 4 Precinct covers an area of 182.48 square kilometres (70.46 mi^{2}).
