= Sparta Precinct, Randolph County, Illinois =

Sparta Precinct
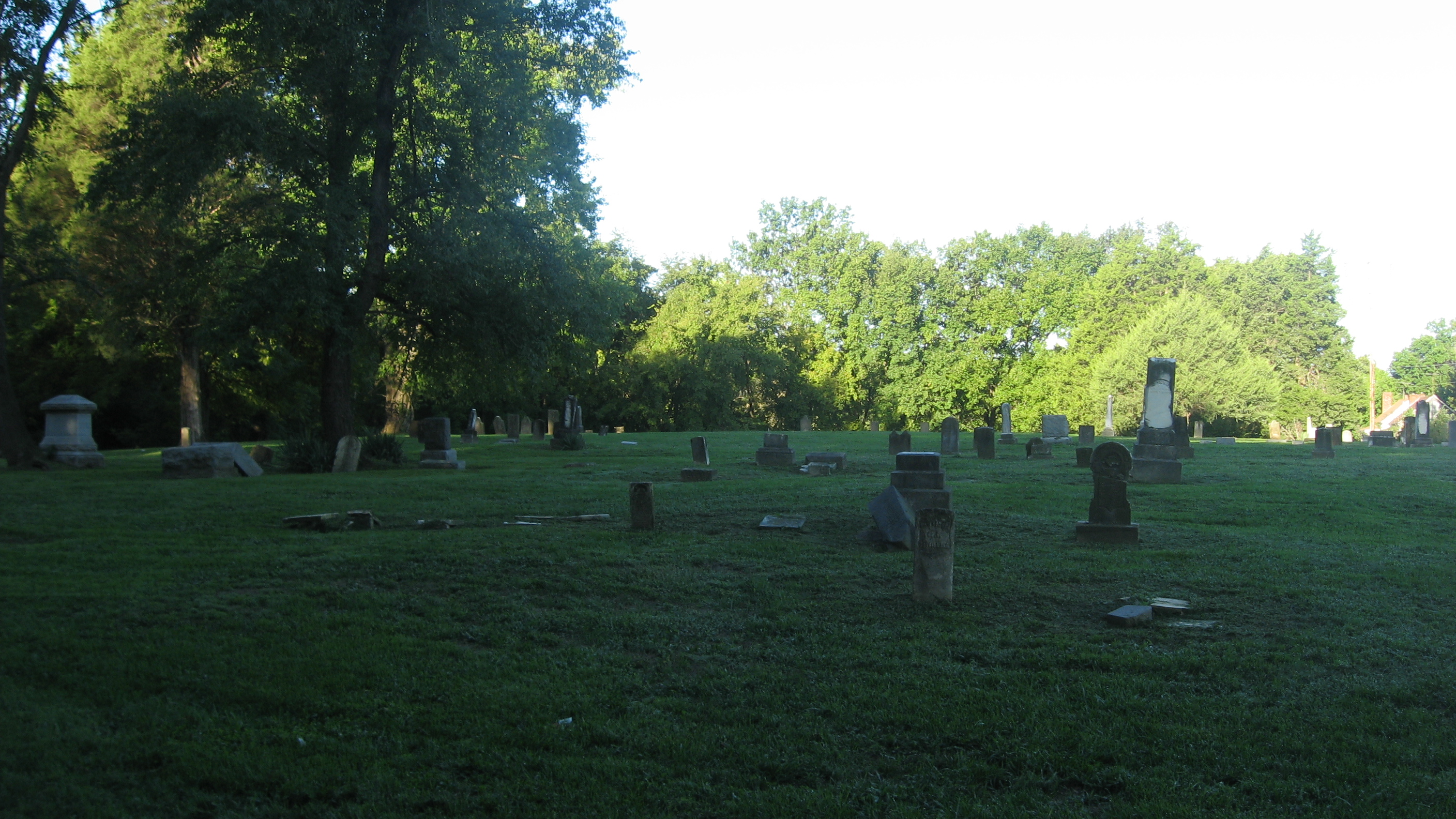
- A nineteenth-century cemetery in the precinct

- Location in Randolph County
- Coordinates: 38°06′40″N 089°40′30″W
- Country: United States
- State: Illinois
- County: Randolph

Area
  - Total: 48.9 sq mi (126.7 km^{2})
  - Land: 48.5 sq mi (125.6 km^{2})
  - Water: 0.42 sq mi (1.1 km^{2}) 0.8%
- Elevation: 489 ft (149 m)

Population (2010)
  - Total: 5,387
  - Density: 111.1/sq mi (42.89/km^{2})
- GNIS feature ID: 1928648

Sparta Precinct is located in Randolph County, Illinois, USA. As of the 2010 census, its population was 5,387.

== Geography ==
Sparta Precinct covers an area of 48.9 square miles (126.7 km^{2}).
