= Petersburg West No. 16 Precinct, Menard County, Illinois =

Petersburg West No. 16 Precinct
- Location in Menard County
- Coordinates: 40°00′44″N 089°51′05″W
- Country: United States
- State: Illinois
- County: Menard

Area
  - Total: 1.35 sq mi (3.49 km^{2})
  - Land: 1.35 sq mi (3.49 km^{2})
  - Water: 0 sq mi (0 km^{2}) 0%
- Elevation: 538 ft (164 m)

Population (2000)
  - Total: 2,299
  - Density: 1,706/sq mi (658.7/km^{2})
- GNIS feature ID: 1928592

Petersburg West No. 16 Precinct is located in Menard County, Illinois, United States. The population was 2,299 at the 2000 census.
