= Chester Precinct, Randolph County, Illinois =

Chester Precinct
- Location in Randolph County
- Coordinates: 37°55′09″N 089°48′27″W
- Country: United States
- State: Illinois
- County: Randolph

Area
  - Total: 38.59 sq mi (99.96 km^{2})
  - Land: 36.27 sq mi (93.93 km^{2})
  - Water: 2.33 sq mi (6.03 km^{2}) 6.03%
- Elevation: 584 ft (178 m)

Population (2010)
  - Total: 9,314
  - Density: 256.8/sq mi (99.16/km^{2})
- GNIS feature ID: 1928462

Chester Precinct is located in Randolph County, Illinois, USA. As of the 2010 census, its population was 9,314.

== Geography ==
Chester Precinct covers an area of 99.96 square kilometres (38.59 mi^{2}).
