= Sandridge No. 8 Precinct, Menard County, Illinois =

Coordinates: 40°05′27″N 89°51′37″W

Sandridge No. 8 Precinct
- Precinct
- Sandridge Precinct, Menard County, Illinois
- Country: United States
- State: Illinois
- County: Menard

Area
  - Total: 22.32 sq mi (57.80 km^{2})
  - Land: 22.17 sq mi (57.42 km^{2})
  - Water: 0.15 sq mi (0.38 km^{2}) 0.7%

Population (2000)
  - Total: 167
- Time zone: UTC-6 (CST)
  - Summer (DST): UTC-5 (CDT)

Sandridge No. 8 Precinct is located in Menard County, Illinois. The population was 167 at the 2000 census.
