= Prairie du Rocher Precinct, Randolph County, Illinois =

Prairie du Rocher Precinct
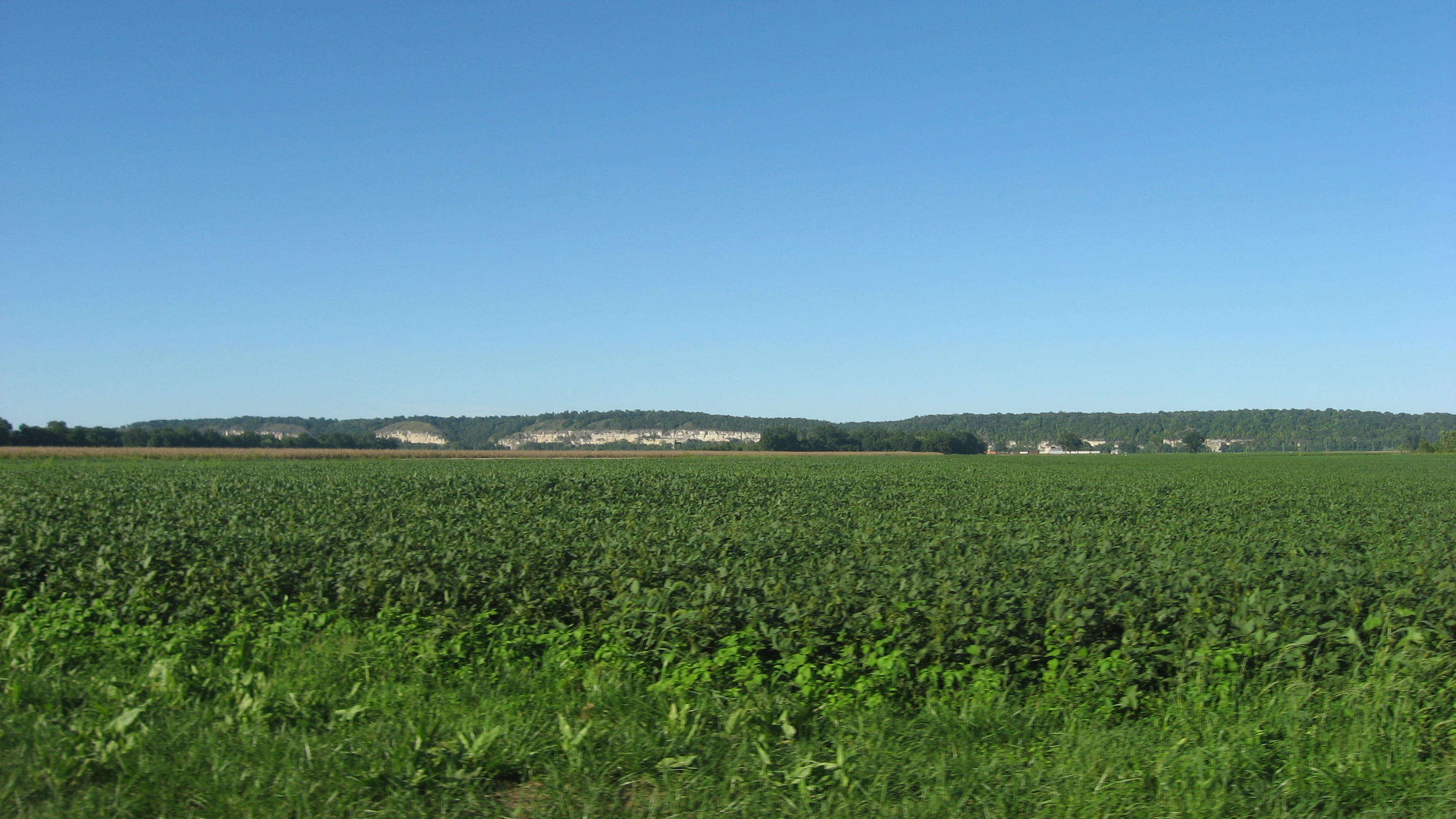
- Fields in the precinct

- Location in Randolph County
- Coordinates: 38°04′53″N 090°05′57″W
- Country: United States
- State: Illinois
- County: Randolph

Area
  - Total: 34.81 sq mi (90.17 km^{2})
  - Land: 32.79 sq mi (84.92 km^{2})
  - Water: 2.03 sq mi (5.26 km^{2}) 5.8%
- Elevation: 384 ft (117 m)

Population (2010)
  - Total: 974
  - Density: 29.7/sq mi (11.5/km^{2})
- GNIS feature ID: 1928603

Prairie du Rocher Precinct is located in Randolph County, Illinois, USA. As of the 2010 census, its population was 974.

== Geography ==
Prairie du Rocher Precinct covers an area of 90.17 square kilometres (34.81 mi^{2}).
