= Eddyville No. 6 Precinct, Pope County, Illinois =

Eddyville No. 6 Precinct
- Interactive map of Eddyville No. 6 Precinct
- Coordinates: 37°31′44″N 088°36′27″W
- Country: United States
- State: Illinois
- County: Pope

Area
  - Total: 96.04 sq mi (248.74 km^{2})
  - Land: 96.02 sq mi (248.69 km^{2})
  - Water: 0.019 sq mi (0.05 km^{2}) 0.0002%
- Elevation: 794 ft (242 m)

Population (2000)
  - Total: 721
  - Density: 7.5/sq mi (2.9/km^{2})
- GNIS feature ID: 1928489

Eddyville No. 6 Precinct is located in Pope County, Illinois, USA. As of the 2000 census, its population was 721.

== Geography ==
Eddyville No. 6 Precinct covers an area of 248.69 square kilometres (96.02 mi^{2}).
