= Ellery Precinct, Edwards County, Illinois =

Ellery
- Election Precinct
- Ellery Precinct, Edwards County, Illinois (Illinois)
- Interactive map of Ellery
- Coordinates: 38°22′08″N 88°07′35″W
- Country: United States
- State: Illinois
- County: Edwards

Area
  - Total: 12.98 sq mi (33.6 km^{2})
  - Land: 12.95 sq mi (33.5 km^{2})
  - Water: 0.03 sq mi (0.078 km^{2})
- Elevation: 486 ft (148 m)

Population (2020)
  - Total: 138
  - Density: 10.7/sq mi (4.11/km^{2})
- FIPS code: 17-047-91152
- GNIS feature ID: 1928491

Ellery is an election precinct, or township equivalent, in Edwards County, Illinois. As of the 2020 Census the population was 138.

== Geography ==
According to the 2021 census gazetteer files, Ellery Precinct has a total area of 12.98 square miles (33.62 km^{2}), of which 12.95 square miles (33.54 km^{2}) (or 99.79%) is land and 0.03 square miles (0.08 km^{2}) (or 0.21%) is water.

== Demographics ==
As of the 2020 census there were 138 people, 57 households, and 46 families residing in the precinct. The population density was 10.63 inhabitants per square mile (4.10/km^{2}). There were 64 housing units at an average density of 4.93 per square mile (1.90/km^{2}). The racial makeup of the precinct was 97.83% White, 0.00% African American, 0.00% Native American, 0.00% Asian, 0.00% Pacific Islander, 0.72% from other races, and 1.45% from two or more races. Hispanic or Latino of any race were 0.72% of the population.

There were 57 households, out of which 26.30% had children under the age of 18 living with them, 64.91% were married couples living together, none had a female householder with no spouse present, and 19.30% were non-families. 19.30% of all households were made up of individuals, and none had someone living alone who was 65 years of age or older. The average household size was 2.11 and the average family size was 2.37.

The precinct's age distribution consisted of 14.2% under the age of 18, 9.2% from 18 to 24, 15% from 25 to 44, 30% from 45 to 64, and 31.7% who were 65 years of age or older. The median age was 52.8 years. For every 100 females, there were 126.4 males. For every 100 females age 18 and over, there were 94.3 males.

The median income for a household in the precinct was $65,625, and the median income for a family was $65,833. Males had a median income of $51,406 versus $37,614 for females. The per capita income for the precinct was $37,238. None of the population were below the poverty line.
