= Dixon Precinct, Edwards County, Illinois =

Dixon
- Election Precinct
- Dixon Precinct, Edwards County, Illinois (Illinois)
- Interactive map of Dixon
- Coordinates: 38°17′32″N 88°05′24″W
- Country: United States
- State: Illinois
- County: Edwards

Area
  - Total: 24.06 sq mi (62.3 km^{2})
  - Land: 24.05 sq mi (62.3 km^{2})
  - Water: 0.01 sq mi (0.026 km^{2})
- Elevation: 413 ft (126 m)

Population (2020)
  - Total: 221
  - Density: 9.19/sq mi (3.55/km^{2})
- FIPS code: 17-047-90954
- GNIS feature ID: 1928471

Dixon is an election precinct, or township equivalent, in Edwards County, Illinois. As of the 2020 Census the population was 221.

== Geography ==
According to the 2021 census gazetteer files, Dixon Precinct has a total area of 24.06 square miles (62.32 km^{2}), of which 24.05 square miles (62.29 km^{2}) (or 99.95%) is land and 0.01 square miles (0.03 km^{2}) (or 0.05%) is water.

== Demographics ==
As of the 2020 census there were 221 people, 145 households, and 110 families residing in the precinct. The population density was 9.18 inhabitants per square mile (3.54/km^{2}). There were 110 housing units at an average density of 4.57 per square mile (1.76/km^{2}). The racial makeup of the precinct was 97.29% White, 0.45% African American, 0.00% Native American, 0.00% Asian, 0.00% Pacific Islander, 0.00% from other races, and 2.26% from two or more races. Hispanic or Latino of any race were 0.45% of the population.

There were 145 households, out of which 35.90% had children under the age of 18 living with them, 75.86% were married couples living together, none had a female householder with no spouse present, and 24.14% were non-families. 24.10% of all households were made up of individuals, and 4.10% had someone living alone who was 65 years of age or older. The average household size was 2.39 and the average family size was 2.83.

The precinct's age distribution consisted of 24.9% under the age of 18, 2.0% from 18 to 24, 28.3% from 25 to 44, 39.9% from 45 to 64, and 4.9% who were 65 years of age or older. The median age was 41.3 years. For every 100 females, there were 80.2 males. For every 100 females age 18 and over, there were 89.8 males.

The median income for a household in the precinct was $73,594, and the median income for a family was $63,750. Males had a median income of $41,875 versus $53,929 for females. The per capita income for the precinct was $38,877. No families and none of the population were below the poverty line.
