= Golconda No. 3 Precinct, Pope County, Illinois =

Golconda No. 3 Precinct
- Interactive map of Golconda No. 3 Precinct
- Coordinates: 37°21′46″N 088°29′12″W
- Country: United States
- State: Illinois
- County: Pope

Area
  - Total: 0.59 sq mi (1.52 km^{2})
  - Land: 0.56 sq mi (1.46 km^{2})
  - Water: 0.026 sq mi (0.068 km^{2}) 4.45%
- Elevation: 430 ft (130 m)

Population (2000)
  - Total: 726
  - Density: 1,230/sq mi (474.8/km^{2})
- GNIS feature ID: 1928506

Golconda No. 3 Precinct is located in Pope County, Illinois, USA. Its borders are coextensive with the city of Golconda. As of the 2000 census, its population was 726.

== Geography ==
Golconda No. 3 Precinct covers an area of 1.52 square kilometres (0.59 mi^{2}).
