= Webster No. 5 Precinct, Pope County, Illinois =

Webster No. 5 Precinct
- Interactive map of Webster No. 5 Precinct
- Coordinates: 37°24′33″N 088°39′44″W
- Country: United States
- State: Illinois
- County: Pope

Area
  - Total: 70.12 sq mi (181.60 km^{2})
  - Land: 69.30 sq mi (179.49 km^{2})
  - Water: 0.81 sq mi (2.11 km^{2}) 1.16%
- Elevation: 449 ft (137 m)

Population (2000)
  - Total: 805
  - Density: 11.5/sq mi (4.43/km^{2})
- GNIS feature ID: 1928675

Webster No. 5 Precinct is located in Pope County, Illinois, USA. As of the 2000 census, its population was 805.

== Geography ==
Webster No. 5 Precinct covers an area of 181.60 square kilometres (70.12 mi^{2}).
