= Gilead Precinct, Calhoun County, Illinois =

Gilead Precinct
- Township
- Location in Calhoun County
- Coordinates: 39°07′55″N 090°40′26″W
- Country: United States
- State: Illinois
- County: Calhoun

Area
  - Total: 24.39 sq mi (63.2 km^{2})
  - Land: 20.79 sq mi (53.8 km^{2})
  - Water: 3.60 sq mi (9.3 km^{2})
- Elevation: 502 ft (153 m)

Population (2020)
  - Total: 314
  - Density: 15.1/sq mi (5.83/km^{2})
- FIPS code: 17-013-91350
- GNIS feature ID: 1928502

Gilead Precinct is located in Calhoun County, Illinois. The population was 314 at the 2020 census, a decrease from 342 at the 2010 census.

== Geography ==
According to the 2021 census gazetteer files, Gilead Precinct has a total area of 24.39 square miles (63.17 km^{2}), of which 20.79 square miles (53.85 km^{2}) (or 85.24%) is land and 3.60 square miles (9.32 km^{2}) (or 14.76%) is water.

== Demographics ==
Historical population
Census	Pop.	Note	%±
2000	318		—
2010	342		7.5%
2020	314		−8.2%

As of the 2020 census there were 314 people, 78 households, and 72 families residing in the precinct. The population density was 12.87 inhabitants per square mile (4.97/km^{2}). There were 138 housing units at an average density of 5.66 per square mile (2.19/km^{2}). The racial makeup of the precinct was 98.41% White, 0.00% African American, 0.00% Native American, 0.00% Asian, 0.00% Pacific Islander, 0.00% from other races, and 1.59% from two or more races. Hispanic or Latino of any race were 0.32% of the population.

There were 78 households, out of which 50.00% had children under the age of 18 living with them, 66.67% were married couples living together, 0.00% had a female householder with no spouse present, and 7.69% were non-families. 7.70% of all households were made up of individuals, and 7.70% had someone living alone who was 65 years of age or older. The average household size was 2.90 and the average family size was 3.06.

The precinct's age distribution consisted of 22.6% under the age of 18, 6.6% from 18 to 24, 37.6% from 25 to 44, 11.1% from 45 to 64, and 22.1% who were 65 years of age or older. The median age was 35.6 years. For every 100 females, there were 82.3 males. For every 100 females age 18 and over, there were 92.3 males.

The median income for a household in the precinct was $64,625, and the median income for a family was $71,250. Males had a median income of $42,100 versus $61,477 for females. The per capita income for the precinct was $37,985. None of the population was below the poverty line.
