= Ellis Grove Precinct, Randolph County, Illinois =

Ellis Grove Precinct
- Location in Randolph County
- Coordinates: 38°00′21″N 089°54′09″W
- Country: United States
- State: Illinois
- County: Randolph

Area
  - Total: 28.76 sq mi (74.49 km^{2})
  - Land: 28.20 sq mi (73.04 km^{2})
  - Water: 0.56 sq mi (1.45 km^{2}) 1.95%
- Elevation: 548 ft (167 m)

Population (2010)
  - Total: 953
- GNIS feature ID: 1928492

Ellis Grove Precinct is located in Randolph County, Illinois, USA. As of the 2010 census, its population was 953.

== Geography ==
Ellis Grove Precinct covers an area of 74.49 square kilometres (28.76 mi^{2}).
