= Wine Hill Precinct, Randolph County, Illinois =

Wine Hill Precinct
- Location in Randolph County
- Coordinates: 37°55′25″N 089°39′11″W
- Country: United States
- State: Illinois
- County: Randolph

Area
  - Total: 27.65 sq mi (71.61 km^{2})
  - Land: 27.62 sq mi (71.54 km^{2})
  - Water: 0.027 sq mi (0.07 km^{2}) 0.1%
- Elevation: 489 ft (149 m)

Population (2010)
  - Total: 435
  - Density: 15.7/sq mi (6.08/km^{2})
- GNIS feature ID: 1928683

Wine Hill Precinct is located in Randolph County, Illinois, USA. As of the 2010 census, its population was 435.

== Geography ==
Wine Hill Precinct covers an area of 71.54 square kilometres (27.62 mi^{2}).
