= Cairo Precinct, Illinois =

Cairo Precinct
- Location of Cairo Precinct in Alexander County
- Coordinates: 36°59′51″N 089°10′39″W
- Country: United States
- State: Illinois
- County: Alexander

Area
  - Total: 9.11 sq mi (23.6 km^{2})
  - Land: 6.99 sq mi (18.1 km^{2})
  - Water: 2.12 sq mi (5.5 km^{2}) 23.28%
- Elevation: 315 ft (96 m)

Population (2020)
  - Total: 1,733
  - Density: 248/sq mi (95.7/km^{2})
- GNIS feature ID: 1928457
- FIPS code: 17-003-90612

Cairo Precinct is located in Alexander County, Illinois, United States. As of the 2020 census, its population was 1,733. The precinct is coterminous with the city of Cairo.

== Geography ==
According to the 2021 census gazetteer files, Cairo Precinct has a total area of 9.11 square miles (23.59 km^{2}), of which 6.99 square miles (18.10 km^{2}) (or 76.72%) is land and 2.12 square miles (5.49 km^{2}) (or 23.28%) is water. It contains the southernmost point in Illinois.

== Demographics ==
As of the 2020 census there were 1,733 people, 828 households, and 377 families residing in the precinct. The population density was 190.29 inhabitants per square mile (73.47/km^{2}). There were 1,036 housing units at an average density of 113.76 per square mile (43.92/km^{2}). The racial makeup of the precinct was 25.33% White, 68.96% African American, 0.40% Native American, 0.00% Asian, 0.00% Pacific Islander, 0.63% from other races, and 4.67% from two or more races. Hispanic or Latino of any race were 1.15% of the population.

There were 828 households, out of which 18.00% had children under the age of 18 living with them, 23.07% were married couples living together, 20.29% had a female householder with no spouse present, and 54.47% were non-families. 52.30% of all households were made up of individuals, and 23.60% had someone living alone who was 65 years of age or older. The average household size was 2.16 and the average family size was 3.42.

The precinct's age distribution consisted of 21.7% under the age of 18, 9.3% from 18 to 24, 16.9% from 25 to 44, 28.8% from 45 to 64, and 23.3% who were 65 years of age or older. The median age was 47.4 years. For every 100 females, there were 87.1 males. For every 100 females age 18 and over, there were 94.5 males.

The median income for a household in the precinct was $27,661, and the median income for a family was $31,280. Males had a median income of $14,464 versus $21,188 for females. The per capita income for the precinct was $19,661. About 32.9% of families and 36.2% of the population were below the poverty line, including 72.1% of those under age 18 and 14.2% of those age 65 or over.
