= Shelby No. 2 Precinct, Edwards County, Illinois =

Shelby No. 2
- Election Precinct
- Shelby No. 2 Precinct, Edwards County, Illinois (Illinois)
- Interactive map of Shelby No. 2
- Coordinates: 38°28′09″N 88°05′54″W
- Country: United States
- State: Illinois
- County: Edwards

Area
  - Total: 21.85 sq mi (56.6 km^{2})
  - Land: 21.79 sq mi (56.4 km^{2})
  - Water: 0.07 sq mi (0.18 km^{2})
- Elevation: 433 ft (132 m)

Population (2020)
  - Total: 219
  - Density: 10.1/sq mi (3.88/km^{2})
- FIPS code: 17-047-93156
- GNIS feature ID: 1928646

Shelby No. 1 Precinct is one of the 12 precincts of Edwards County, Illinois, United States. As of the 2020 census, the population was 219.

== Geography ==
According to the 2021 census gazetteer files, Shelby No. 2 Precinct has a total area of 21.85 square miles (56.59 km^{2}), of which 21.79 square miles (56.44 km^{2}) (or 99.70%) is land and 0.07 square miles (0.18 km^{2}) (or 0.30%) is water.

== Demographics ==
As of the 2020 census there were 219 people, 135 households, and 109 families residing in the precinct. The population density was 10.02 inhabitants per square mile (3.87/km^{2}). There were 110 housing units at an average density of 5.03 per square mile (1.94/km^{2}). The racial makeup of the precinct was 98.17% White, 0.00% African American, 0.00% Native American, 0.00% Asian, 0.00% Pacific Islander, 0.00% from other races, and 1.83% from two or more races. Hispanic or Latino of any race were 0.91% of the population.

There were 135 households, out of which 12.60% had children under the age of 18 living with them, 57.78% were married couples living together, 22.96% had a female householder with no spouse present, and 19.26% were non-families. 15.60% of all households were made up of individuals, and 3.70% had someone living alone who was 65 years of age or older. The average household size was 2.10 and the average family size was 2.30.

The precinct's age distribution consisted of 9.5% under the age of 18, 3.9% from 18 to 24, 16.6% from 25 to 44, 11.7% from 45 to 64, and 58.5% who were 65 years of age or older. The median age was 66.7 years. For every 100 females, there were 88.1 males. For every 100 females age 18 and over, there were 94.7 males.

The median income for a household in the precinct was $44,213, and the median income for a family was $54,750. Males had a median income of $25,104 versus $51,181 for females. The per capita income for the precinct was $28,798. No families and 6.0% of the population were below the poverty line, including none of those under age 18 and 3.0% of those age 65 or over.
