= Tilden Precinct, Randolph County, Illinois =

Tilden Precinct
- Location in Randolph County
- Coordinates: 38°11′25″N 089°42′29″W
- Country: United States
- State: Illinois
- County: Randolph

Area
  - Total: 22.56 sq mi (58.42 km^{2})
  - Land: 22.44 sq mi (58.12 km^{2})
  - Water: 0.12 sq mi (0.31 km^{2}) 0.5%
- Elevation: 449 ft (137 m)

Population (2010)
  - Total: 1,156
  - Density: 51.51/sq mi (19.89/km^{2})
- GNIS feature ID: 1928660

Tilden Precinct is located in Randolph County, Illinois, USA. As of the 2010 census, its population was 1,156.

== Geography ==
Tilden Precinct covers an area of 58.42 square kilometres (22.56 mi^{2}).
