= Irish Grove No. 4 Precinct, Menard County, Illinois =

Coordinates: 40°06′01″N 89°38′19″W

Irish Grove No. 4 Precinct
- Precinct
- Irish Grove Precinct, Menard County, Illinois
- Country: United States
- State: Illinois
- County: Menard

Area
  - Total: 26.25 sq mi (68.00 km^{2})
  - Land: 26.17 sq mi (67.79 km^{2})
  - Water: 0.081 sq mi (0.21 km^{2}) 0.3%

Population (2000)
  - Total: 229
- Time zone: UTC-6 (CST)
  - Summer (DST): UTC-5 (CDT)

Irish Grove No. 4 Precinct is located in Menard County, Illinois. The population was 229 at the 2000 census.
