= Golconda No. 1 Precinct, Pope County, Illinois =

Golconda No. 1 Precinct
- Interactive map of Golconda No. 1 Precinct
- Coordinates: 37°21′32″N 088°33′59″W
- Country: United States
- State: Illinois
- County: Pope

Area
  - Total: 49.15 sq mi (127.30 km^{2})
  - Land: 48.29 sq mi (125.07 km^{2})
  - Water: 0.86 sq mi (2.23 km^{2}) 1.75%
- Elevation: 571 ft (174 m)

Population (2000)
  - Total: 708
  - Density: 14.4/sq mi (5.56/km^{2})
- GNIS feature ID: 1928504

Golconda No. 1 Precinct is located in Pope County, Illinois, USA. As of the 2000 census, its population was 708.

== Geography ==
Golconda No. 1 Precinct covers an area of 127.30 square kilometres (49.15 mi^{2}).
