= Sugar Grove No. 5 Precinct, Menard County, Illinois =

Coordinates: 40°02′33″N 89°41′39″W

Sugar Grove No. 5 Precinct
- Precinct
- Sugar Grove Precinct, Menard County, Illinois
- Country: United States
- State: Illinois
- County: Menard

Area
  - Total: 23.179 sq mi (60.034 km^{2})
  - Land: 0 sq mi (0 km^{2})
  - Water: 23.179 sq mi (60.034 km^{2}) 0%

Population (2000)
  - Total: 331
- Time zone: UTC-6 (CST)
  - Summer (DST): UTC-5 (CDT)

Sugar Grove No. 5 Precinct is located in Menard County, Illinois. The population was 331 at the 2000 census.
