= Monroe Precinct, Hardin County, Illinois =

Monroe Precinct
- Location in Hardin County

- Hardin County's Location in Illinois
- Coordinates: 37°32′55″N 088°20′14″W
- Country: United States
- State: Illinois
- County: Hardin

Area
  - Total: 49.88 sq mi (129.2 km^{2})
  - Land: 19.82 sq mi (51.3 km^{2})
  - Water: 0.07 sq mi (0.18 km^{2}) 0.14%
- Elevation: 466 ft (142 m)

Population (2020)
  - Total: 580
  - Density: 29/sq mi (11/km^{2})
- GNIS feature ID: 1928574
- FIPS code: 17-069-92170

Monroe Precinct is located in Hardin County, Illinois, USA. As of the 2020 census, its population was 580.

== Geography ==
According to the 2021 census gazetteer files, Monroe Precinct has a total area of 49.88 square miles (129.19 km^{2}), of which 49.82 square miles (129.03 km^{2}) (or 99.86%) is land and 0.07 square miles (0.18 km^{2}) (or 0.14%) is water.

== Demographics ==
Historical population
| Census | Pop. | Note | %± |
|---|---|---|---|
| 1990 | 665 | | — |
| 2000 | 696 | | 4.7% |
| 2010 | 638 | | −8.3% |
| 2020 | 580 | | −9.1% |

As of the 2020 census there were 580 people, 187 households, and 120 families residing in the precinct. The population density was 11.63 inhabitants per square mile (4.49/km^{2}). There were 318 housing units at an average density of 6.37 per square mile (2.46/km^{2}). The racial makeup of the precinct was 94.48% White, 0.00% African American, 0.00% Native American, 0.34% Asian, 0.34% Pacific Islander, 0.00% from other races, and 4.83% from two or more races. Hispanic or Latino of any race were 0.86% of the population.

There were 187 households, out of which 18.70% had children under the age of 18 living with them, 57.22% were married couples living together, 2.14% had a female householder with no spouse present, and 35.83% were non-families. 30.50% of all households were made up of individuals, and 16.00% had someone living alone who was 65 years of age or older. The average household size was 2.45 and the average family size was 3.18.

The precinct's age distribution consisted of 12.7% under the age of 18, 2.2% from 18 to 24, 27.8% from 25 to 44, 23.3% from 45 to 64, and 34.1% who were 65 years of age or older. The median age was 46.9 years. For every 100 females, there were 142.3 males. For every 100 females age 18 and over, there were 131.2 males.

The median income for a household in the precinct was $67,708, and the median income for a family was $76,071. Males had a median income of $76,181 versus $40,673 for females. The per capita income for the precinct was $33,933. About 6.7% of families and 11.6% of the population were below the poverty line, including 34.5% of those under age 18 and none of those age 65 or over.
