= Salem No. 2 Precinct, Edwards County, Illinois =

Salem No. 2
- Election Precinct
- Salem No. 2 Precinct, Edwards County, Illinois (Illinois)
- Interactive map of Salem No. 2
- Coordinates: 38°32′06″N 88°02′17″W
- Country: United States
- State: Illinois
- County: Edwards

Area
  - Total: 16.77 sq mi (43.4 km^{2})
  - Land: 16.69 sq mi (43.2 km^{2})
  - Water: 0.08 sq mi (0.21 km^{2})
- Elevation: 502 ft (153 m)

Population (2020)
  - Total: 571
  - Density: 34.2/sq mi (13.2/km^{2})
- FIPS code: 17-047-93084
- GNIS feature ID: 1928640

Salem No. 2 Precinct is one of the 12 precincts of Edwards County, Illinois. As of the 2020 census, the population was 571.

== Geography ==
According to the 2021 census gazetteer files, Salem No. 2 Precinct has a total area of 16.77 square miles (43.43 km^{2}), of which 16.69 square miles (43.23 km^{2}) (or 99.53%) is land and 0.08 square miles (0.21 km^{2}) (or 0.47%) is water.

== Demographics ==
As of the 2020 census there were 571 people, 266 households, and 162 families residing in the precinct. The population density was 34.05 inhabitants per square mile (13.15/km^{2}). There were 309 housing units at an average density of 18.43 per square mile (7.12/km^{2}). The racial makeup of the precinct was 97.37% White, 0.35% African American, 0.35% Native American, 0.00% Asian, 0.00% Pacific Islander, 0.18% from other races, and 1.75% from two or more races. Hispanic or Latino of any race were 0.18% of the population.

There were 266 households, out of which 21.80% had children under the age of 18 living with them, 40.98% were married couples living together, 9.40% had a female householder with no spouse present, and 39.10% were non-families. 38.30% of all households were made up of individuals, and 21.10% had someone living alone who was 65 years of age or older. The average household size was 2.29 and the average family size was 3.01.

The precinct's age distribution consisted of 23.6% under the age of 18, 5.4% from 18 to 24, 22.5% from 25 to 44, 26.7% from 45 to 64, and 21.9% who were 65 years of age or older. The median age was 44.3 years. For every 100 females, there were 97.2 males. For every 100 females age 18 and over, there were 97.5 males.

The median income for a household in the precinct was $48,333, and the median income for a family was $62,857. Males had a median income of $45,179 versus $35,893 for females. The per capita income for the precinct was $24,406. About 14.8% of families and 19.3% of the population were below the poverty line, including 11.4% of those under age 18 and 21.7% of those age 65 or over.
