= Petersburg North No. 14 Precinct, Menard County, Illinois =

Coordinates: 40°01′35″N 89°52′02″W

Petersburg North No. 14 Precinct
- Precinct
- Petersburg North Precinct, Menard County, Illinois
- Country: United States
- State: Illinois
- County: Menard

Area
  - Total: 8.32 sq mi (21.54 km^{2})
  - Land: 8.07 sq mi (20.89 km^{2})
  - Water: 0.25 sq mi (0.65 km^{2}) 3%

Population (2000)
  - Total: 137
- Time zone: UTC-6 (CST)
  - Summer (DST): UTC-5 (CDT)

Petersburg North No. 14 Precinct is located in Menard County, Illinois. The population was 137 at the 2000 census.
