= Red Bud Precinct, Randolph County, Illinois =

Red Bud Precinct
- Location in Randolph County
- Coordinates: 38°11′31″N 089°57′41″W
- Country: United States
- State: Illinois
- County: Randolph

Area
  - Total: 36.04 sq mi (93.34 km^{2})
  - Land: 35.70 sq mi (92.47 km^{2})
  - Water: 0.34 sq mi (0.88 km^{2}) 0.9%
- Elevation: 417 ft (127 m)

Population (2010)
  - Total: 4,692
  - Density: 131.4/sq mi (50.74/km^{2})
- GNIS feature ID: 1928632

Red Bud Precinct is located in Randolph County, Illinois, USA. As of the 2010 census, its population was 4,692.

== Geography ==
Red Bud Precinct covers an area of 93.34 square kilometres (36.04 mi^{2}).
