= Athens South No. 1 Precinct, Menard County, Illinois =

Athens South No. 1 Precinct
- Precinct
- Location in Menard County
- Coordinates: 39°56′23″N 089°44′39″W
- Country: United States
- State: Illinois
- County: Menard

Area
  - Total: 12.0 sq mi (31.1 km^{2})
  - Land: 12.0 sq mi (31.1 km^{2})
  - Water: 0 sq mi (0 km^{2}) 0%
- Elevation: 594 ft (181 m)

Population (2000)
  - Total: 1,259
  - Density: 105/sq mi (40.5/km^{2})
- GNIS feature ID: 1928439

Athens South No. 1 Precinct is located in Menard County, Illinois. The population was 1,259 at the 2000 census.
