= Walsh Precinct, Randolph County, Illinois =

Walsh Precinct
- Location in Randolph County
- Coordinates: 38°05′18″N 089°51′31″W
- Country: United States
- State: Illinois
- County: Randolph

Area
  - Total: 27.3 sq mi (70.7 km^{2})
  - Land: 26.7 sq mi (69.2 km^{2})
  - Water: 0.58 sq mi (1.5 km^{2}) 2.1%
- Elevation: 463 ft (141 m)

Population (2010)
  - Total: 454
  - Density: 17.0/sq mi (6.56/km^{2})
- GNIS feature ID: 1928670

Walsh Precinct is located in Randolph County, Illinois, USA. As of the 2010 census, its population was 454.

== Geography ==
Walsh Precinct covers an area of 27.3 square miles (70.7 km^{2}).
