= Fancy Prairie No. 3 Precinct, Menard County, Illinois =

Fancy Prairie No. 3 Precinct
- Location in Menard County
- Coordinates: 40°00′13″N 089°37′01″W
- Country: United States
- State: Illinois
- County: Menard

Area
  - Total: 17.13 sq mi (44.36 km^{2})
  - Land: 17.13 sq mi (44.36 km^{2})
  - Water: 0 sq mi (0 km^{2}) 0%
- Elevation: 620 ft (190 m)

Population (2000)
  - Total: 192
  - Density: 11/sq mi (4.3/km^{2})
- GNIS feature ID: 1928496

Fancy Prairie No. 3 Precinct is located in Menard County, Illinois. The population was 192 at the 2000 census.
