= Cave-In-Rock Precinct, Hardin County, Illinois =

Cave-In-Rock Precinct
- Precinct
- Location in Hardin County

- Hardin County's Location in Illinois
- Coordinates: 37°29′12″N 088°11′11″W
- Country: United States
- State: Illinois
- County: Hardin

Area
  - Total: 14.41 sq mi (37.3 km^{2})
  - Land: 14.04 sq mi (36.4 km^{2})
  - Water: 0.37 sq mi (0.96 km^{2}) 2.60%
- Elevation: 404 ft (123 m)

Population (2020)
  - Total: 525
  - Density: 37.4/sq mi (14.4/km^{2})
- GNIS feature ID: 1928459
- FIPS code: 17-069-90666

Cave-In-Rock Precinct is located in Hardin County, Illinois, USA. As of the 2020 census, its population was 525.

== Geography ==
According to the 2021 census gazetteer files, Cave-In-Rock Precinct has a total area of 14.41 square miles (37.32 km^{2}), of which 14.04 square miles (36.36 km^{2}) (or 97.40%) is land and 0.37 square miles (0.96 km^{2}) (or 2.60%) is water.

== Demographics ==
As of the 2020 census there were 525 people, 201 households, and 138 families residing in the precinct. The population density was 36.43 inhabitants per square mile (14.07/km^{2}). There were 338 housing units at an average density of 23.46 per square mile (9.06/km^{2}). The racial makeup of the precinct was 93.90% White, 0.00% African American, 0.00% Native American, 0.38% Asian, 0.00% Pacific Islander, 0.19% from other races, and 5.52% from two or more races. Hispanic or Latino of any race were 0.76% of the population.

There were 201 households, out of which 21.40% had children under the age of 18 living with them, 55.72% were married couples living together, 2.49% had a female householder with no spouse present, and 31.34% were non-families. 30.30% of all households were made up of individuals, and 10.90% had someone living alone who was 65 years of age or older. The average household size was 2.50 and the average family size was 2.90.

The precinct's age distribution consisted of 10.9% under the age of 18, 6.2% from 18 to 24, 26.5% from 25 to 44, 16% from 45 to 64, and 40.6% who were 65 years of age or older. The median age was 50.5 years. For every 100 females, there were 105.3 males. For every 100 females age 18 and over, there were 101.8 males.

The median income for a household in the precinct was $49,469, and the median income for a family was $49,688. Males had a median income of $25,813 versus $41,250 for females. The per capita income for the precinct was $33,433. About 10.9% of families and 11.5% of the population were below the poverty line, including 12.7% of those under age 18 and 2.5% of those age 65 or over.

Historical population
Census	Pop.	Note	%±
1990	871		—
2000	794		−8.8%
2010	692		−12.8%
2020	525		−24.1%
