= Crater Precinct, Calhoun County, Illinois =

Crater Precinct
- Township
- Location in Calhoun County
- Coordinates: 39°16′00″N 090°38′33″W
- Country: United States
- State: Illinois
- County: Calhoun

Area
  - Total: 21.69 sq mi (56.17 km^{2})
  - Land: 20.91 sq mi (54.16 km^{2})
  - Water: 0.77 sq mi (2 km^{2}) 3.56%
- Elevation: 633 ft (193 m)

Population (2020)
  - Total: 502
  - Density: 24.0/sq mi (9.27/km^{2})
- GNIS feature ID: 1928469
- FIPS code: 17-013-90900

Crater Precinct is located in Calhoun County, Illinois, USA. As of the 2020 census the population was 502, a decline from 525 at the 2010 census.

The precinct was formed in 1834 from Belleview Precinct as part of Illinois Precinct (comprising modern-day Carlin and Crater Precincts) and was separated in 1839.

== Geography ==
According to the 2021 census gazetteer files, Crater Precinct has a total area of 21.68 square miles (56.15 km^{2}), of which 20.93 square miles (54.21 km^{2}) (or 96.51%) is land and 0.76 square miles (1.97 km^{2}) (or 3.49%) is water.

== Demographics ==
Historical population
Census	Pop.	Note	%±
2000	560		—
2010	525		−6.2%
2020	502		−4.4%

As of the 2020 census there were 502 people, 198 households, and 148 families residing in the precinct. The population density was 23.15 inhabitants per square mile (8.94/km^{2}). There were 289 housing units at an average density of 13.33 per square mile (5.15/km^{2}). The racial makeup of the precinct was 91.24% White, 0.00% African American, 1.39% Native American, 0.00% Asian, 0.00% Pacific Islander, 0.00% from other races, and 7.37% from two or more races. Hispanic or Latino of any race were 2.19% of the population.

There were 198 households, out of which 36.40% had children under the age of 18 living with them, 63.13% were married couples living together, 10.10% had a female householder with no spouse present, and 25.25% were non-families. 25.30% of all households were made up of individuals, and 7.60% had someone living alone who was 65 years of age or older. The average household size was 2.53 and the average family size was 3.03.

The precinct's age distribution consisted of 28.0% under the age of 18, 13.1% from 18 to 24, 22.8% from 25 to 44, 22.1% from 45 to 64, and 13.9% who were 65 years of age or older. The median age was 30.5 years. For every 100 females, there were 94.7 males. For every 100 females age 18 and over, there were 84.7 males.

The median income for a household in the precinct was $57,778, and the median income for a family was $100,000. Males had a median income of $51,000 versus $20,938 for females. The per capita income for the precinct was $26,344. About 16.9% of families and 19.0% of the population were below the poverty line, including 36.6% of those under age 18 and 16.7% of those age 65 or over.
