= Stone Church Precinct, Hardin County, Illinois =

Stone Church Precinct
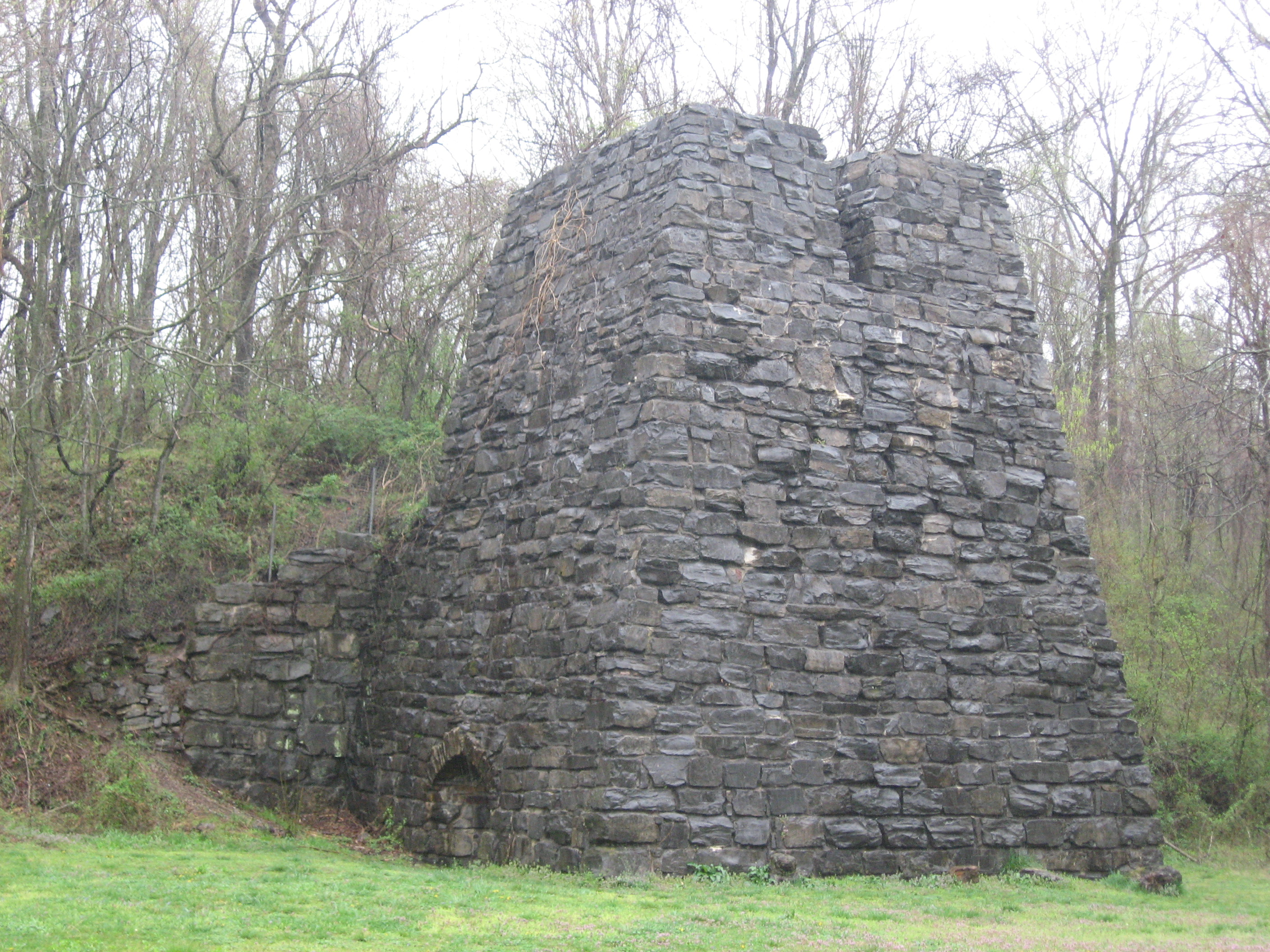
- Illinois Iron Furnace, a historic site in the township

- Location in Hardin County

- Hardin County's Location in Illinois
- Coordinates: 37°28′18″N 088°22′05″W
- Country: United States
- State: Illinois
- County: Hardin

Area
  - Total: 27.16 sq mi (70.35 km^{2})
  - Land: 27.06 sq mi (70.08 km^{2})
  - Water: 0.10 sq mi (0.27 km^{2}) 0.38%
- Elevation: 466 ft (142 m)

Population (2020)
  - Total: 524
  - Density: 24/sq mi (9.1/km^{2})
- GNIS feature ID: 1928651
- FIPS code: 17-069-93276

Stone Church Precinct is located in Hardin County, Illinois, USA. As of the 2020 census, its population was 524.

== Geography ==
According to the 2021 census gazetteer files, Stone Church Precinct has a total area of 26.74 square miles (69.26 km^{2}), of which 26.52 square miles (68.69 km^{2}) (or 99.15%) is land and 0.23 square miles (0.60 km^{2}) (or 0.85%) is water.

== Demographics ==
Historical population
Census	Pop.	Note	%±
1990	686		—
2000	640		−6.7%
2010	587		−8.3%
2020	524		−10.7%

As of the 2020 census there were 524 people, 296 households, and 184 families residing in the precinct. The population density was 19.59 inhabitants per square mile (7.56/km^{2}). There were 296 housing units at an average density of 11.07 per square mile (4.27/km^{2}). The racial makeup of the precinct was 93.32% White, 0.38% African American, 0.00% Native American, 0.57% Asian, 0.00% Pacific Islander, 0.57% from other races, and 5.15% from two or more races. Hispanic or Latino of any race were 1.91% of the population.

There were 296 households, out of which 16.20% had children under the age of 18 living with them, 39.86% were married couples living together, none had a female householder with no spouse present, and 37.84% were non-families. 37.80% of all households were made up of individuals, and 7.40% had someone living alone who was 65 years of age or older. The average household size was 2.39 and the average family size was 3.24.

The precinct's age distribution consisted of 7.9% under the age of 18, 10.9% from 18 to 24, 22% from 25 to 44, 29.6% from 45 to 64, and 29.7% who were 65 years of age or older. The median age was 49.5 years. For every 100 females, there were 73.1 males. For every 100 females age 18 and over, there were 71.6 males.

The median income for a household in the precinct was $58,628, and the median income for a family was $62,794. Males had a median income of $23,750 versus $57,951 for females. The per capita income for the precinct was $31,734. About 7.1% of families and 5.8% of the population were below the poverty line, including 21.4% of those under age 18 and none of those age 65 or over.
