= Rock Precinct, Hardin County, Illinois =

Rock Precinct
- Location in Hardin County

- Hardin County's Location in Illinois
- Coordinates: 37°32′03″N 088°10′01″W
- Country: United States
- State: Illinois
- County: Hardin

Area
  - Total: 59.24 sq mi (153.4 km^{2})
  - Land: 56.70 sq mi (146.9 km^{2})
  - Water: 2.54 sq mi (6.6 km^{2}) 4.29%
- Elevation: 499 ft (152 m)

Population (2020)
  - Total: 411
  - Density: 7.25/sq mi (2.80/km^{2})
- GNIS feature ID: 1928635
- FIPS code: 17-069-92995

Rock Precinct is located in Hardin County, Illinois, USA. As of the 2020 census, there were 155 households and a population of 411.

== Geography ==
According to the 2021 census gazetteer files, Rock Precinct has a total area of 59.24 square miles (153.43 km^{2}), of which 56.70 square miles (146.85 km^{2}) (or 95.71%) is land and 2.54 square miles (6.58 km^{2}) (or 4.29%) is water.

== Demographics ==
Historical population
Census	Pop.	Note	%±
1990	730		—
2000	658		−9.9%
2010	514		−21.9%
2020	411		−20.0%

As of the 2020 census there were 411 people, 155 households, and 130 families residing in the precinct. The population density was 6.94 inhabitants per square mile (2.68/km^{2}). There were 317 housing units at an average density of 5.35 per square mile (2.07/km^{2}). The racial makeup of the precinct was 92.46% White, 0.00% African American, 0.00% Native American, 0.97% Asian, 0.00% Pacific Islander, 0.73% from other races, and 5.84% from two or more races. Hispanic or Latino of any race were 2.92% of the population.

There were 155 households, out of which 34.20% had children under the age of 18 living with them, 76.13% were married couples living together, 3.87% had a female householder with no spouse present, and 16.13% were non-families. 7.10% of all households were made up of individuals, and 4.50% had someone living alone who was 65 years of age or older. The average household size was 3.17 and the average family size was 3.14.

The precinct's age distribution consisted of 12.1% under the age of 18, 15.5% from 18 to 24, 24.2% from 25 to 44, 29.6% from 45 to 64, and 18.5% who were 65 years of age or older. The median age was 41.0 years. For every 100 females, there were 106.2 males. For every 100 females age 18 and over, there were 110.1 males.

The median income for a household in the precinct was $69,911, and the median income for a family was $69,750. Males had a median income of $47,414 versus $24,110 for females. The per capita income for the precinct was $35,244. About 0.0% of families and 4.7% of the population were below the poverty line, including 0.0% of those under age 18 and 21.9% of those age 65 or over.
