= Bone Gap Precinct, Edwards County, Illinois =

Bone Gap
- Election Precinct
- Interactive map of Bone Gap
- Coordinates: 38°26′57″N 88°00′01″W
- Country: United States
- State: Illinois
- County: Edwards

Area
  - Total: 26.77 sq mi (69.3 km^{2})
  - Land: 26.75 sq mi (69.3 km^{2})
  - Water: 0.01 sq mi (0.026 km^{2})
- Elevation: 476 ft (145 m)

Population (2020)
  - Total: 438
  - Density: 16.4/sq mi (6.32/km^{2})
- FIPS code: 17-047-90486
- GNIS feature ID: 1928450

Bone Gap is an election precinct, or township equivalent, in Edwards County, Illinois. As of the 2020 Census the population was 438.

== Geography ==
According to the 2021 census gazetteer files, Bone Gap Precinct has a total area of 26.77 square miles (69.33 km^{2}), of which 26.75 square miles (69.28 km^{2}) (or 99.96%) is land and 0.01 square miles (0.03 km^{2}) (or 0.04%) is water.

== Demographics ==
As of the 2020 census there were 438 people, 105 households, and 66 families residing in the precinct. The population density was 16.36 inhabitants per square mile (6.32/km^{2}). There were 192 housing units at an average density of 7.17 per square mile (2.77/km^{2}). The racial makeup of the precinct was 97.95% White, 0.46% African American, 0.23% Native American, 0.00% Asian, 0.00% Pacific Islander, 0.00% from other races, and 1.37% from two or more races. Hispanic or Latino of any race were 0.23% of the population.

There were 105 households, out of which 16.20% had children under the age of 18 living with them, 51.43% were married couples living together, 11.43% had a female householder with no spouse present, and 37.14% were non-families. 31.40% of all households were made up of individuals, and 16.20% had someone living alone who was 65 years of age or older. The average household size was 2.17 and the average family size was 2.77.

The precinct's age distribution consisted of 14.9% under the age of 18, 14.0% from 18 to 24, 18.9% from 25 to 44, 34.6% from 45 to 64, and 17.5% who were 65 years of age or older. The median age was 47.5 years. For every 100 females, there were 85.4 males. For every 100 females age 18 and over, there were 92.1 males.

The median income for a household in the precinct was $54,531, and the median income for a family was $89,000. Males had a median income of $50,893 versus $30,694 for females. The per capita income for the precinct was $25,071. About 4.5% of families and 8.3% of the population were below the poverty line, including none of those under age 18 and 7.5% of those age 65 or over.
