= Steeleville Precinct, Randolph County, Illinois =

Steeleville Precinct
- Location in Randolph County
- Coordinates: 38°00′49″N 089°40′12″W
- Country: United States
- State: Illinois
- County: Randolph

Area
  - Total: 21.46 sq mi (55.59 km^{2})
  - Land: 21.41 sq mi (55.44 km^{2})
  - Water: 0.058 sq mi (0.15 km^{2}) 0.3%
- Elevation: 449 ft (137 m)

Population (2010)
  - Total: 2,668
  - Density: 124.6/sq mi (48.12/km^{2})
- GNIS feature ID: 1928649

Steeleville Precinct is located in Randolph County, Illinois, USA. As of the 2010 census, its population was 2,668.

== Geography ==
Steeleville Precinct covers an area of 55.59 square kilometres (21.46 mi^{2}).
