= Hamburg Precinct, Calhoun County, Illinois =

Hamburg Precinct
- Township
- Location in Calhoun County
- Coordinates: 39°15′04″N 90°42′08″W
- Country: United States
- State: Illinois
- County: Calhoun

Area
  - Total: 31.88 sq mi (82.6 km^{2})
  - Land: 28.95 sq mi (75.0 km^{2})
  - Water: 2.92 sq mi (7.6 km^{2})
- Elevation: 742 ft (226 m)

Population (2020)
  - Total: 454
  - Density: 15.7/sq mi (6.05/km^{2})
- FIPS code: 17-013-91584
- GNIS feature ID: 1928514

Hamburg Precinct is located in Calhoun County, Illinois. The population at the 2020 census was 454, a decline from 561 at the 2010 census.

== Geography ==
According to the 2021 census gazetteer files, Hamburg Precinct has a total area of 31.88 square miles (82.57 km^{2}), of which 28.95 square miles (74.98 km^{2}) (or 90.83%) is land and 2.92 square miles (7.56 km^{2}) (or 9.17%) is water.

== Demographics ==
Historical population
Census	Pop.	Note	%±
2000	578		—
2010	561		−2.9%
2020	454		−19.1%

As of the 2020 census there were 454 people, 146 households, and 122 families residing in the precinct. The population density was 14.24 inhabitants per square mile (5.50/km^{2}). There were 301 housing units at an average density of 9.44 per square mile (3.64/km^{2}). The racial makeup of the precinct was 92.51% White, 0.44% African American, 0.22% Native American, 0.22% Asian, 0.00% Pacific Islander, 0.44% from other races, and 6.17% from two or more races. Hispanic or Latino of any race were 1.76% of the population.

There were 146 households, out of which 18.50% had children under the age of 18 living with them, 74.66% were married couples living together, 3.42% had a female householder with no spouse present, and 16.44% were non-families. 14.40% of all households were made up of individuals, and 14.40% had someone living alone who was 65 years of age or older. The average household size was 2.77 and the average family size was 3.09.

The precinct's age distribution consisted of 18.3% under the age of 18, 0.0% from 18 to 24, 11.6% from 25 to 44, 48.7% from 45 to 64, and 21.3% who were 65 years of age or older. The median age was 56.6 years. For every 100 females, there were 122.0 males. For every 100 females age 18 and over, there were 95.3 males.

The median income for a household in the precinct was $57,917, and the median income for a family was $70,556. Males had a median income of $52,500 versus $31,277 for females. The per capita income for the precinct was $31,811. About 2.5% of families and 5.7% of the population were below the poverty line, including 25.7% of those under age 18 and 0.0% of those age 65 or over.
