= Albion No. 2 Precinct, Edwards County, Illinois =

Albion Number 2
- Election Precinct
- Interactive map of Albion Number 2
- Coordinates: 38°24′44″N 88°06′11″W
- Country: United States
- State: Illinois
- County: Edwards

Area
  - Total: 14.82 sq mi (38.4 km^{2})
  - Land: 14.79 sq mi (38.3 km^{2})
  - Water: 0.03 sq mi (0.078 km^{2})
- Elevation: 456 ft (139 m)

Population (2020)
  - Total: 780
  - Density: 53/sq mi (20/km^{2})
- FIPS code: 17-047-90041
- GNIS feature ID: 1928425

Albion No. 2 is an election precinct, or township equivalent, in Edwards County, Illinois. As of the 2020 Census the population was 780.

== Geography ==
According to the 2021 census gazetteer files, Albion No. 2 Precinct has a total area of 14.82 square miles (38.38 km^{2}), of which 14.79 square miles (38.31 km^{2}) (or 99.82%) is land and 0.03 square miles (0.08 km^{2}) (or 0.18%) is water.

== Demographics ==
As of the 2020 census there were 780 people, 296 households, and 202 families residing in the precinct. The population density was 52.63 inhabitants per square mile (20.32/km^{2}). There were 352 housing units at an average density of 23.75 per square mile (9.17/km^{2}). The racial makeup of the precinct was 95.13% White, 0.51% African American, 0.00% Native American, 0.26% Asian, 0.51% Pacific Islander, 0.13% from other races, and 3.46% from two or more races. Hispanic or Latino of any race were 0.77% of the population.

There were 296 households, out of which 25.00% had children under the age of 18 living with them, 48.65% were married couples living together, 18.24% had a female householder with no spouse present, and 31.76% were non-families. 28.70% of all households were made up of individuals, and 16.90% had someone living alone who was 65 years of age or older. The average household size was 2.32 and the average family size was 2.85.

The precinct's age distribution consisted of 23.9% under the age of 18, 8.0% from 18 to 24, 24.1% from 25 to 44, 19.4% from 45 to 64, and 24.6% who were 65 years of age or older. The median age was 39.7 years. For every 100 females, there were 68.4 males. For every 100 females age 18 and over, there were 73.2 males.

The median income for a household in the precinct was $67,692, and the median income for a family was $74,531. Males had a median income of $50,625 versus $33,603 for females. The per capita income for the precinct was $29,313. No families and 2.4% of the population were below the poverty line, including none of those under age 18 and 7.1% of those age 65 or over.
