= Palestine Precinct, Randolph County, Illinois =

Palestine Precinct
- Location in Randolph County
- Coordinates: 37°59′51″N 089°49′02″W
- Country: United States
- State: Illinois
- County: Randolph

Area
  - Total: 32.3 sq mi (83.7 km^{2})
  - Land: 32.1 sq mi (83.1 km^{2})
  - Water: 0.23 sq mi (0.6 km^{2}) 0.7%
- Elevation: 568 ft (173 m)

Population (2010)
  - Total: 601
  - Density: 18.7/sq mi (7.23/km^{2})
- GNIS feature ID: 1928586

Palestine Precinct is located in Randolph County, Illinois, United States. As of the 2010 census, its population was 601.

== Geography ==
Palestine Precinct covers an area of 32.3 square miles (83.7 km^{2}).
