= Oakford No. 9 Precinct, Menard County, Illinois =

Coordinates: 40°06′30″N 89°57′00″W

Oakford No. 9 Precinct
- Precinct
- Oakford Precinct, Menard County, Illinois
- Country: United States
- State: Illinois
- County: Menard
- Precinct: Unknown

Area
  - Total: 0.21 sq mi (0.54 km^{2})
  - Land: 18.66 sq mi (48.32 km^{2})
  - Water: 18.87 sq mi (48.87 km^{2}) 1.1%

Population (2000)
  - Total: 488
- Time zone: UTC-6 (CST)
  - Summer (DST): UTC-5 (CDT)

Oakford No. 9 Precinct is located in Menard County, Illinois. The population was 488 at the 2000 census.
