= Tallula No. 11 Precinct, Menard County, Illinois =

Coordinates: 39.94°N 89.93°W

Tallula No. 11 Precinct
- Precinct
- Tallula Precinct, Menard County, Illinois
- Country: United States
- State: Illinois
- County: Menard

Area
  - Total: 38.56 sq mi (99.86 km^{2})
  - Land: 38.56 sq mi (99.86 km^{2})
  - Water: 0 sq mi (0 km^{2}) 0%

Population (2000)
  - Total: 816
- Time zone: UTC-6 (CST)
  - Summer (DST): UTC-5 (CDT)

Tallula No. 11 Precinct is located in Menard County, Illinois. The population was 816 at the 2000 census.
