= Central Precinct, Randolph County, Illinois =

Central Precinct
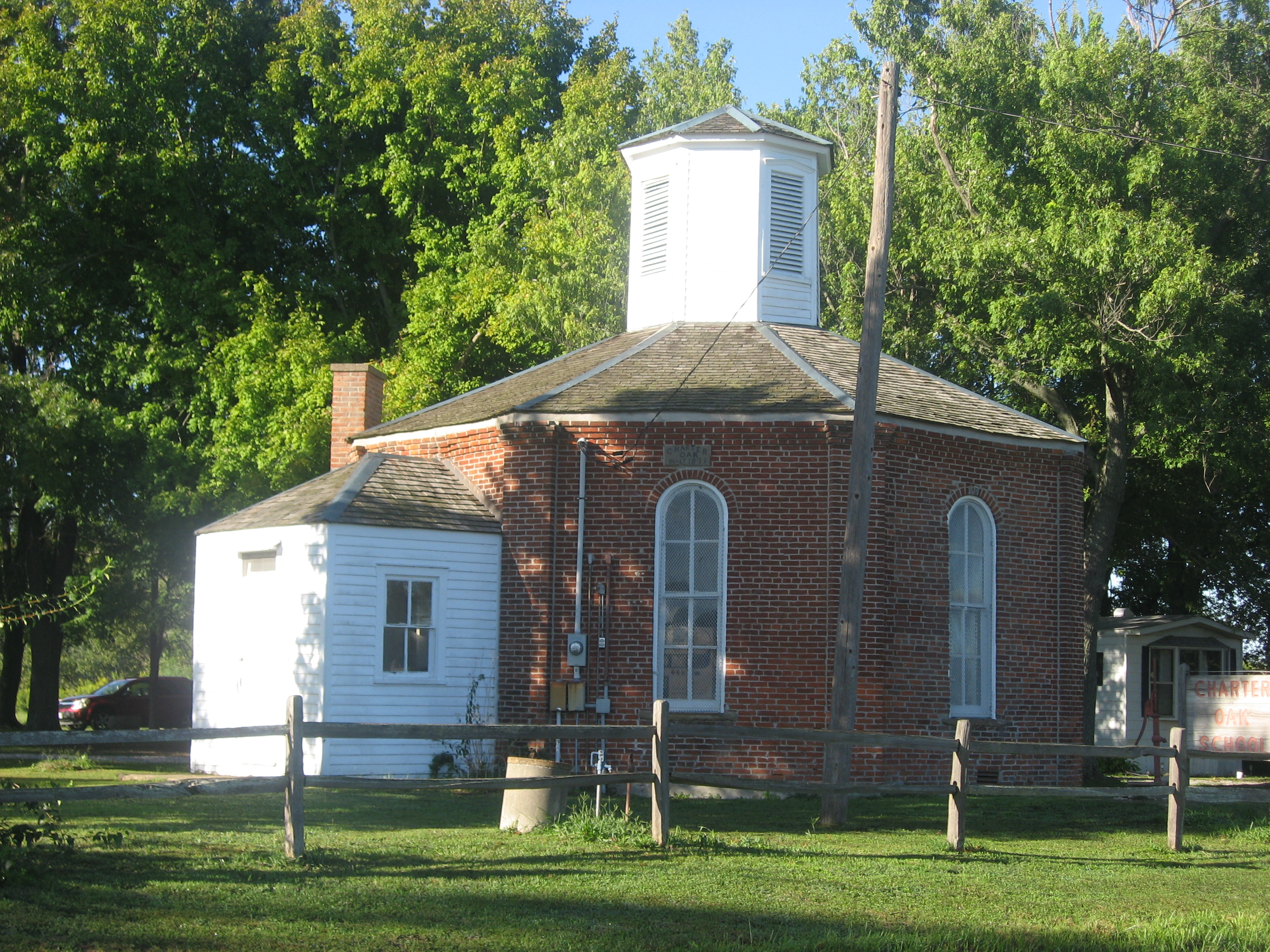
- Charter Oak Schoolhouse, a historic site west of Schuline

- Location in Randolph County
- Coordinates: 38°06′11″N 089°46′30″W
- Country: United States
- State: Illinois
- County: Randolph

Area
  - Total: 31.5 sq mi (81.7 km^{2})
  - Land: 31.1 sq mi (80.5 km^{2})
  - Water: 0.50 sq mi (1.3 km^{2}) 1.58%
- Elevation: 528 ft (161 m)

Population (2010)
  - Total: 445
  - Density: 14.3/sq mi (5.53/km^{2})
- GNIS feature ID: 1928460

Central Precinct is located in Randolph County, Illinois, USA. As of the 2010 census, its population was 445.

== Geography ==
Central Precinct covers an area of 31.5 square miles (81.7 km^{2}).
