= Greenview No. 6 Precinct, Menard County, Illinois =

Greenview No. 6 Precinct
- Location in Menard County
- Coordinates: 40°06′18″N 089°42′10″W
- Country: United States
- State: Illinois
- County: Menard

Area
  - Total: 22.73 sq mi (58.88 km^{2})
  - Land: 22.63 sq mi (58.61 km^{2})
  - Water: 0.11 sq mi (0.28 km^{2}) 0.48%
- Elevation: 515 ft (157 m)

Population (2000)
  - Total: 1,038
  - Density: 46/sq mi (17.7/km^{2})
- GNIS feature ID: 1928513

Greenview No. 6 Precinct is located in Menard County in the U.S. state of Illinois. The population was 1,038 at the 2000 census.
