= Albion No. 1 Precinct, Edwards County, Illinois =

Albion Number 1
- Election Precinct
- Interactive map of Albion Number 1
- Coordinates: 38°22′43″N 88°02′36″W
- Country: United States
- State: Illinois
- County: Edwards

Area
  - Total: 11.97 sq mi (31.0 km^{2})
  - Land: 11.946 sq mi (30.94 km^{2})
  - Water: 0.024 sq mi (0.062 km^{2})
- Elevation: 463 ft (141 m)

Population (2020)
  - Total: 1,060
  - Density: 88.7/sq mi (34.3/km^{2})
- FIPS code: 17-047-90039
- GNIS feature ID: 1928424

Albion No. 1 is an election precinct, or township equivalent, in Edwards County, Illinois. As of the 2020 Census the population was 1,060.

== Geography ==
According to the 2021 census gazetteer files, Albion has a total area of 11.97 square miles (31.00 km^{2}), of which 11.946 square miles (30.94 km^{2}) (or 99.80%) is land and 0.024 square miles (0.06 km^{2}) (or 0.20%) is water.

== Demographics ==
As of the 2020 census there were 1,060 people, 551 households, and 386 families residing in the precinct. The population density was 88.55 inhabitants per square mile (34.19/km^{2}). There were 530 housing units at an average density of 44.28 per square mile (17.10/km^{2}). The racial makeup of the precinct was 96.60% White, 0.19% African American, 0.00% Native American, 0.66% Asian, 0.09% Pacific Islander, 0.75% from other races, and 1.70% from two or more races. Hispanic or Latino of any race were 1.23% of the population.

There were 551 households, out of which 39.60% had children under the age of 18 living with them, 51.72% were married couples living together, 15.97% had a female householder with no spouse present, and 29.95% were non-families. 28.10% of all households were made up of individuals, and 11.40% had someone living alone who was 65 years of age or older. The average household size was 2.42 and the average family size was 2.87.

The precinct's age distribution consisted of 24.8% under the age of 18, 10.2% from 18 to 24, 21% from 25 to 44, 30.1% from 45 to 64, and 14.0% who were 65 years of age or older. The median age was 40.7 years. For every 100 females, there were 95.9 males. For every 100 females age 18 and over, there were 99.6 males.

The median income for a household in the precinct was $59,219, and the median income for a family was $66,765. Males had a median income of $38,333 versus $34,015 for females. The per capita income for the precinct was $28,596. About 16.8% of families and 20.3% of the population were below the poverty line, including 26.1% of those under age 18 and 7.5% of those age 65 or over.
