= Bremen Precinct, Randolph County, Illinois =

Bremen Precinct
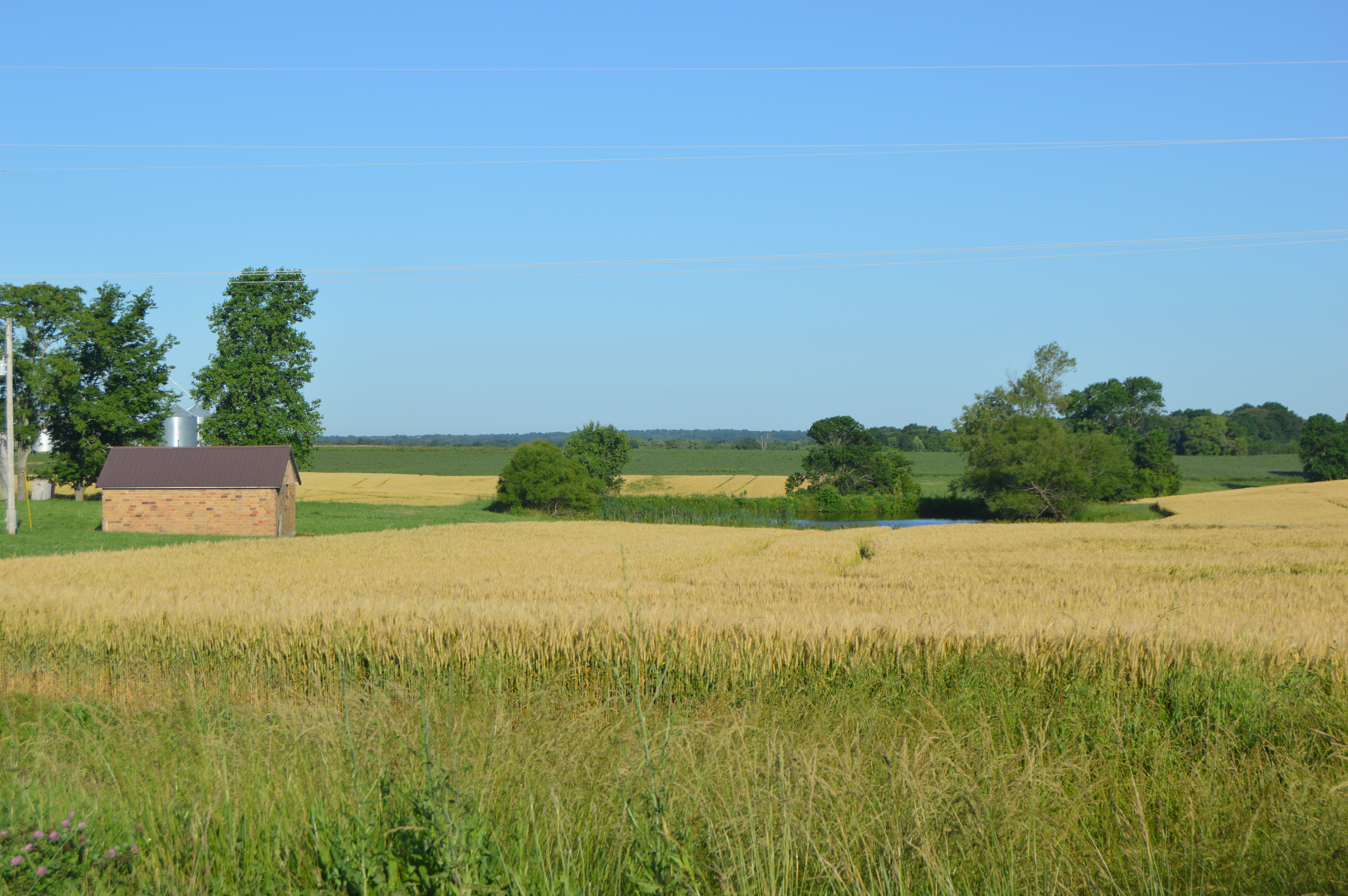
- Northeast of Bremen on Illinois Route 150

- Location in Randolph County
- Coordinates: 37°58′21″N 089°44′25″W
- Country: United States
- State: Illinois
- County: Randolph

Area
  - Total: 21.18 sq mi (54.86 km^{2})
  - Land: 21.18 sq mi (54.86 km^{2})
  - Water: 0 sq mi (0.00 km^{2}) 0%
- Elevation: 535 ft (163 m)

Population (2010)
  - Total: 443
- GNIS feature ID: 1928451

Bremen Precinct is located in Randolph County, Illinois, USA. As of the 2010 census, its population was 443.

== Geography ==
Bremen Precinct covers an area of 54.86 square kilometres (21.18 mi^{2}).
