= Rosiclare Precinct, Hardin County, Illinois =

Rosiclare Precinct
- Location in Hardin County

- Hardin County's Location in Illinois
- Coordinates: 37°25′00″N 088°22′00″W
- Country: United States
- State: Illinois
- County: Hardin

Area
  - Total: 6.81 sq mi (17.6 km^{2})
  - Land: 6.28 sq mi (16.3 km^{2})
  - Water: 0.53 sq mi (1.4 km^{2}) 7.80%
- Elevation: 374 ft (114 m)

Population (2020)
  - Total: 1,082
  - Density: 172/sq mi (66.5/km^{2})
- GNIS feature ID: 422243
- FIPS code: 17-069-93050

Rosiclare Precinct is located in Hardin County, Illinois, USA. As of the 2020 census, its population was 1,082. At some point prior to 2010, Rosiclare Precinct was formed from a merger of East Rosiclare and West Rosiclare Precincts.

== Geography ==
According to the 2021 census gazetteer files, Rosiclare Precinct has a total area of 6.81 square miles (17.64 km^{2}), of which 6.28 square miles (16.27 km^{2}) (or 92.20%) is land and 0.53 square miles (1.37 km^{2}) (or 7.80%) is water.

== Demographics ==
Historical population
Census	Pop.	Note	%±
2010	1,186		—
2020	1,082		−8.8%

As of the 2020 census there were 1,082 people, 354 households, and 241 families residing in the precinct. The population density was 158.88 inhabitants per square mile (61.34/km^{2}). There were 577 housing units at an average density of 84.73 per square mile (32.71/km^{2}). The racial makeup of the precinct was 93.72% White, 0.92% African American, 0.00% Native American, 0.55% Asian, 0.18% Pacific Islander, 0.18% from other races, and 4.44% from two or more races. Hispanic or Latino of any race were 2.22% of the population.

There were 354 households, out of which 28.80% had children under the age of 18 living with them, 54.80% were married couples living together, 11.02% had a female householder with no spouse present, and 31.92% were non-families. 28.50% of all households were made up of individuals, and 11.60% had someone living alone who was 65 years of age or older. The average household size was 2.82 and the average family size was 3.51.

The precinct's age distribution consisted of 17.5% under the age of 18, 5.7% from 18 to 24, 20% from 25 to 44, 47.5% from 45 to 64, and 9.2% who were 65 years of age or older. The median age was 49.1 years. For every 100 females, there were 120.8 males. For every 100 females age 18 and over, there were 145.2 males.

The median income for a household in the precinct was $38,750, and the median income for a family was $55,208. Males had a median income of $41,402 versus $16,548 for females. The per capita income for the precinct was $18,838. About 12.4% of families and 17.1% of the population were below the poverty line, including 28.7% of those under age 18 and 13.8% of those age 65 or over.
