= Illinois's 13th congressional district =

U.S. House district for Illinois

Coordinates: 39°30′56″N 89°31′11″W

- Interactive map of district boundaries since January 3, 2023. Points indicate major cities in the district.
- Representative: Nikki Budzinski; D–Springfield
- Area: 2,303.1 mi^{2} (5,965 km^{2})
- Distribution: 78.9% urban; 21.1% rural
- Population (2025): 727,989
- Median household income: $63,635
- Ethnicity: 64.5% White; 20.7% Black; 5.0% Two or more races; 4.9% Hispanic; 4.3% Asian; 0.6% other
- Cook PVI: D+5

The 13th congressional district of Illinois is currently represented by Democrat Nikki Budzinski.

== Recent election results from statewide races ==
Year	Office	Results
2008	President	Obama 60% - 38%
2012	President	Obama 57% - 43%
2016	President	Clinton 51% - 42%
2016	Senate	Duckworth 55% - 40%
2016	Comptroller (Spec.)	Mendoza 50% - 44%
2018	Governor	Pritzker 54% - 38%
2018	Attorney General	Raoul 52% - 46%
2018	Secretary of State	White 66% - 32%
2018	Comptroller	Mendoza 58% - 38%
2018	Treasurer	Frerichs 58% - 38%
2020	President	Biden 54% - 43%
2020	Senate	Durbin 54% - 42%
2022	Senate	Duckworth 56% - 42%
2022	Governor	Pritzker 54% - 43%
2022	Attorney General	Raoul 53% - 45%
2022	Secretary of State	Giannoulias 53% - 45%
2022	Comptroller	Mendoza 57% - 41%
2022	Treasurer	Frerichs 55% - 43%
2024	President	Harris 54% - 43%

== Composition ==
Following the 2020 census and the subsequent redistricting cycle, the 13th congressional district was significantly altered to include Champaign, Urbana, most of Decatur and Springfield, and most of the Metro East of St. Louis. All of Macoupin County, and sections of Champaign, Macon, Madison, Piatt, Sangamon, and St. Clair Counties, are included in the new 13th. The redistricting turned the 13th district from a fairly even district to a more heavily Democratic-leaning one, and consequently, it elected a Democratic representative for the first time since 1892.

For the 118th and successive Congresses (based on redistricting following the 2020 census), the district contains all or portions of the following counties, townships, and municipalities:

Champaign County (14)

Bondville, Champaign, Champaign Township, Colfax Township, Cunningham Township, Hensley Township (part, also 15th), Ivesdale, Sadorus Township, Savoy, Scott Township, Somer Township (part, also 15th), Tolono (part, also 15th), Tolono Township (part, also 15th), Urbana, Urbana Township

Macon County (13)

Decatur (part, also 15th), Decatur Township (part, also 15th), Forsyth, Harristown, Harristown Township, Hickory Point Township (part, also 15th), Illini Township, Niantic, Niantic Township, Oakley Township (part, also 15th), Oreana, Warrensburg, Whitmore Township

Macoupin County (47)

All 47 townships and municipalities

Madison County (28)

Alton (part, also 15th), Alton Township (part, shared with 15th), Bethalto, Chouteau Township, Collinsville (part, also 15th; shared with St. Clair County), Collinsville Township (part, also 15th), East Alton, Edwardsville (part, also 15th), Edwardsville Township, Fairmont City (part, shared with St. Clair County), Fort Russell Township (part, also 15th), Foster Township (part, also 15th), Glen Carbon (part, also 15th), Godfrey (part, also 15th), Granite City, Granite City Township, Hartford, Madison (part, shared with St. Clair County), Maryville (part, also 15th), Moro Township (part, also 15th; shared with Moro CDP), Nameoki Township, Pontoon Beach, Roxana, South Roxana, Venice, Venice Township, Wood River, Wood River Township

Piatt County (8)

Bement, Bement Township, Cerro Gordo, Cerro Gordo Township, Cisco, Monticello, Monticello Township, Willow Branch Township

Sangamon County (29)

Auburn, Auburn Township, Ball Township, Buffalo, Capital Township, Chatham, Chatham Township, Cooper Township, Cotton Hill Township, Dawson, Divernon, Divernon Township, Grandview, Illiopolis, Illiopolis Township, Jerome, Lanesville Township, Leland Grove, Mechanicsburg, Mechanicsburg Township, Pawnee, Pawnee Township, Rochester, Rochester Township, Southern View, Springfield (part, also 15th), Springfield Township (part, also 15th), Thayer, Woodside Township

St. Clair County (24)

Alorton, Belleville (part, also 12th), Cahokia, Caseyville, Caseyville Township (part, also 12th), Canteen Township, Centreville, Centreville Township, Dupo (part, also 12th), East Carondelet, East St. Louis, East St. Louis Township, Fairmont City (part, shared with Madison County), Fairview Heights (part, also 12th), O'Fallon (part, also 12th), O'Fallon Township (part, also 12th), Sauget, Shiloh (part, also 12th), St. Clair Township, Stites Township, Stookey Township (part, also 12th), Sugar Loaf Township (part, also 12th), Swansea, Washington Park

== List of members representing the district ==
Member	Party	Years	Cong ress	Electoral history	District location
District created March 4, 1863
William J. Allen (Marion)	Democratic	March 4, 1863 – March 3, 1865	38th	Redistricted from the 9th district and re-elected in 1862. Lost re-election.	
Andrew J. Kuykendall (Vienna)	Republican	March 4, 1865 – March 3, 1867	39th	Elected in 1864. Retired.	
Green B. Raum (Harrisburg)	Republican	March 4, 1867 – March 3, 1869	40th	Elected in 1866. Lost re-election.	
John M. Crebs (Carmi)	Democratic	March 4, 1869 – March 3, 1873	41st 42nd	Elected in 1868. Re-elected in 1870. Retired.	
John McNulta (Bloomington)	Republican	March 4, 1873 – March 3, 1875	43rd	Elected in 1872. Lost re-election.	
Adlai E. Stevenson (Bloomington)	Democratic	March 4, 1875 – March 3, 1877	44th	Elected in 1874. Lost re-election.	
Thomas F. Tipton (Bloomington)	Republican	March 4, 1877 – March 3, 1879	45th	Elected in 1876. Lost re-election.	
Adlai E. Stevenson (Bloomington)	Democratic	March 4, 1879 – March 3, 1881	46th	Elected in 1878. Lost re-election.	
Dietrich C. Smith (Pekin)	Republican	March 4, 1881 – March 3, 1883	47th	Elected in 1880. Lost re-election.	
William M. Springer (Springfield)	Democratic	March 4, 1883 – March 3, 1895	48th 49th 50th 51st 52nd 53rd	Redistricted from the 12th district and re-elected in 1882. Re-elected in 1884. Re-elected in 1886. Re-elected in 1888. Re-elected in 1890. Re-elected in 1892. Redistricted to the 17th district.	
Vespasian Warner (Clinton)	Republican	March 4, 1895 – March 3, 1903	54th 55th 56th 57th	Elected in 1894. Re-elected in 1896. Re-elected in 1898. Re-elected in 1900. Redistricted to the 19th district.	
Robert R. Hitt (Mount Morris)	Republican	March 4, 1903 – September 20, 1906	58th 59th	Redistricted from the 9th district and re-elected in 1902. Re-elected in 1904. Died.	
Vacant		September 20, 1906 – November 6, 1906	59th		
Frank O. Lowden (Oregon)	Republican	November 6, 1906 – March 3, 1911	59th 60th 61st	Elected to finish Hitt's term. Re-elected in 1906. Re-elected in 1908.	
John C. McKenzie (Elizabeth)	Republican	March 4, 1911 – March 3, 1925	62nd 63rd 64th 65th 66th 67th 68th	Elected in 1910. Re-elected in 1912. Re-elected in 1914. Re-elected in 1916. Re-elected in 1918. Re-elected in 1920. Re-elected in 1922. Retired.	
William R. Johnson (Freeport)	Republican	March 4, 1925 – March 3, 1933	69th 70th 71st 72nd	Elected in 1924. Re-elected in 1926. Re-elected in 1928. Re-elected in 1930. Lost renomination.	
Leo E. Allen (Galena)	Republican	March 4, 1933 – January 3, 1949	73rd 74th 75th 76th 77th 78th 79th 80th	Elected in 1932. Re-elected in 1934. Re-elected in 1936. Re-elected in 1938. Re-elected in 1940. Re-elected in 1942. Re-elected in 1944. Re-elected in 1946. Redistricted to the 16th district.	
Ralph E. Church (Evanston)	Republican	January 3, 1949 – March 21, 1950	81st	Redistricted from the 10th district and re-elected in 1948. Died.	
Vacant		March 21, 1950 – January 3, 1951	81st		
Marguerite S. Church (Evanston)	Republican	January 3, 1951 – January 3, 1963	82nd 83rd 84th 85th 86th 87th	Elected in 1950. Re-elected in 1952. Re-elected in 1954. Re-elected in 1956. Re-elected in 1958. Re-elected in 1960. Retired.	
Donald Rumsfeld (Wilmette)	Republican	January 3, 1963 – May 25, 1969	88th 89th 90th 91st	Elected in 1962. Re-elected in 1964. Re-elected in 1966. Re-elected in 1968. Resigned to become Director of the Office of Economic Opportunity.	
Vacant		May 25, 1969 – November 25, 1969	91st		
Phil Crane (Winnetka)	Republican	November 25, 1969 – January 3, 1973	91st 92nd	Elected to finish Rumsfeld's term. Re-elected in 1970. Redistricted to the 12th district.	
Robert McClory (Lake Bluff)	Republican	January 3, 1973 – January 3, 1983	93rd 94th 95th 96th 97th	Redistricted from the 12th district and re-elected in 1972. Re-elected in 1974. Re-elected in 1976. Re-elected in 1978. Re-elected in 1980. Retired.	
John N. Erlenborn (Glen Ellyn)	Republican	January 3, 1983 – January 3, 1985	98th	Redistricted from the 14th district and re-elected in 1982. Retired.	
Harris W. Fawell (Naperville)	Republican	January 3, 1985 – January 3, 1999	99th 100th 101st 102nd 103rd 104th 105th	Elected in 1984. Re-elected in 1986. Re-elected in 1988. Re-elected in 1990. Re-elected in 1992. Re-elected in 1994. Re-elected in 1996. Retired.	
Judy Biggert (Hinsdale)	Republican	January 3, 1999 – January 3, 2013	106th 107th 108th 109th 110th 111th 112th	Elected in 1998. Re-elected in 2000. Re-elected in 2002. Re-elected in 2004. Re-elected in 2006. Re-elected in 2008. Re-elected in 2010. Redistricted to the 11th district and lost re-election there.	
Judy Biggert (Hinsdale)	Republican	January 3, 1999 – January 3, 2013	106th 107th 108th 109th 110th 111th 112th	Elected in 1998. Re-elected in 2000. Re-elected in 2002. Re-elected in 2004. Re-elected in 2006. Re-elected in 2008. Re-elected in 2010. Redistricted to the 11th district and lost re-election there.	2003–2013
Rodney L. Davis (Taylorville)	Republican	January 3, 2013 – January 3, 2023	113th 114th 115th 116th 117th	Elected in 2012. Re-elected in 2014. Re-elected in 2016. Re-elected in 2018. Re-elected in 2020. Redistricted to the 15th district and lost renomination there.	2013–2023
Nikki Budzinski (Springfield)	Democratic	January 3, 2023 – present	118th 119th	Elected in 2022. Re-elected in 2024. Re-elected in 2026.	2023–present

== Recent election results ==
=== 2012 ===
Illinois's 13th congressional district, 2012
Party	Candidate	Votes	%
Republican	Rodney L. Davis	137,034	46.6
Democratic	David Gill	136,032	46.2
Independent	John Hartman	21,319	7.2
Total votes		294,385	100.0
Republican hold			

=== 2014 ===
The Republican and Democratic primaries took place on March 18, 2014. In the Republican primary, incumbent Rodney L. Davis defeated fellow Republicans Erika Harold and Michael Firsching. In the Democratic primary, Ann Callis defeated George Gollin and David Green. Bill Byrnes had previously withdrawn from the Democratic primary. Josh Dill ran in the district as an independent.

Illinois's 13th congressional district, 2014
Party	Candidate	Votes	%
Republican	Rodney Davis (incumbent)	123,337	58.7
Democratic	Ann Callis	86,935	41.3
Total votes		210,272	100.0
Republican hold			

=== 2016 ===
Illinois's 13th congressional district, 2016
Party	Candidate	Votes	%
Republican	Rodney Davis (incumbent)	187,583	59.7
Democratic	Mark Wicklund	126,811	40.3
Total votes		314,394	100.0
Republican hold			

=== 2018 ===
Illinois's 13th congressional district, 2018
Party	Candidate	Votes	%
Republican	Rodney Davis (incumbent)	136,516	50.4
Democratic	Betsy Dirksen Londrigan	134,458	49.6
Independent	Thomas J. Kuna (write-in)	7	0.0
Total votes		270,981	100.0
Republican hold			

=== 2020 ===
Illinois's 13th congressional district, 2020
Party	Candidate	Votes	%	±%
Republican	Rodney Davis (incumbent)	181,373	54.46	+4.08%
Democratic	Betsy Dirksen Londrigan	151,648	45.54	−4.08%
Total votes		333,021	100.0	
Republican hold				

=== 2022 ===
Illinois's 13th congressional district, 2022
Party	Candidate	Votes	%
Democratic	Nikki Budzinski	141,788	56.61
Republican	Regan Deering	108,646	43.38
Write-in		16	0.01
Total votes		250,450	100.0
Democratic gain from Republican			

=== 2024 ===
Illinois's 13th congressional district, 2024
Party	Candidate	Votes	%	±%
Democratic	Nikki Budzinski (incumbent)	191,339	58.07	+1.46%
Republican	Joshua Lloyd	137,917	41.86	−1.52%
Write-in		244	0.07	N/A
Total votes		329,500	100.0	
Democratic hold				

== See also ==
- Illinois's congressional districts
- List of United States congressional districts
