= Talkington Township, Sangamon County, Illinois =

Coordinates: 39°33′54″N 89°51′41″W

Talkington Township
- Township
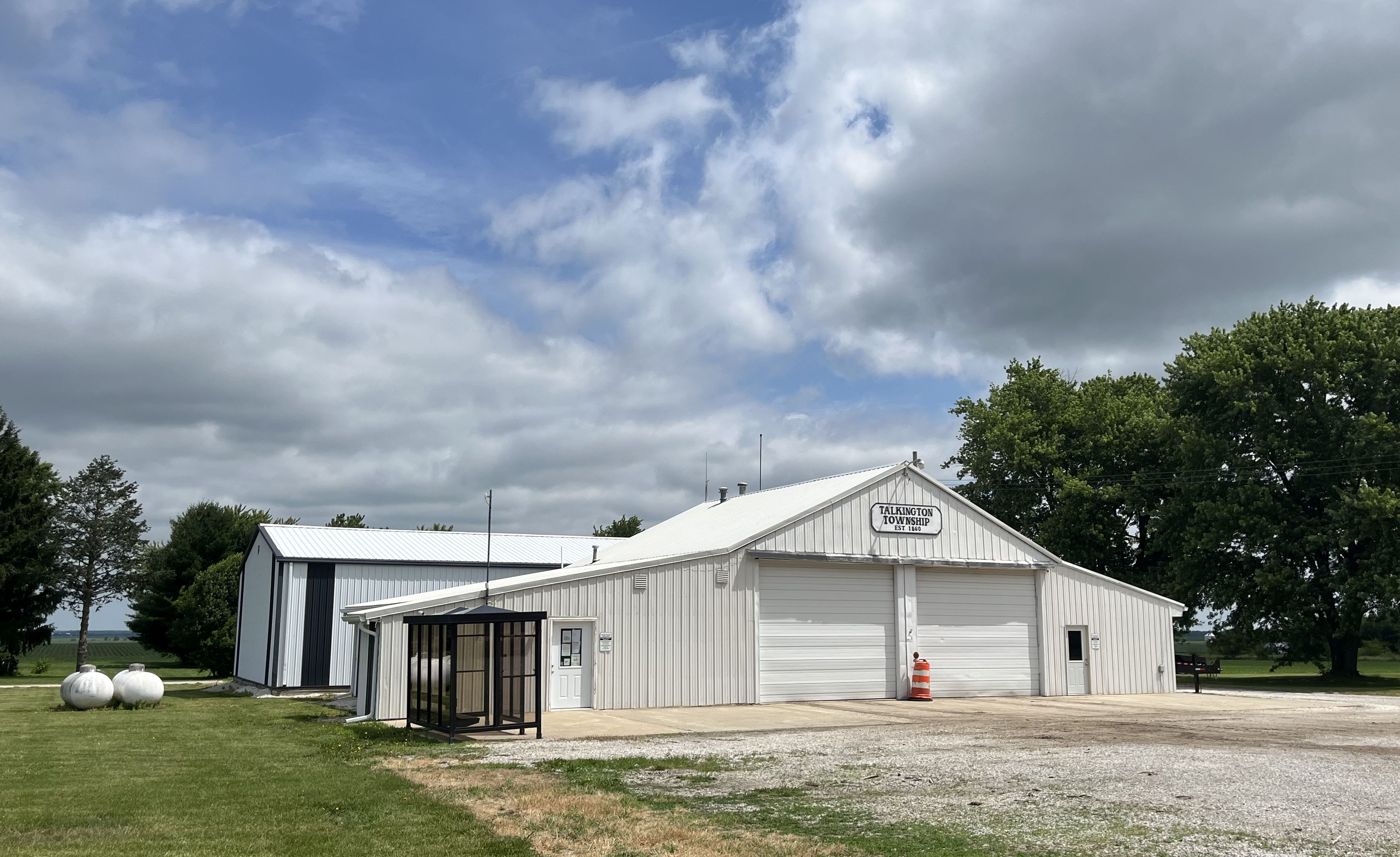
- Talkington Township building in Lowder

- Location in Sangamon County

- Sangamon County's location in Illinois
- Country: United States
- State: Illinois
- County: Sangamon
- Established: 1861

Area
  - Total: 37.51 sq mi (97.2 km^{2})
  - Land: 37.51 sq mi (97.2 km^{2})
  - Water: 0 sq mi (0 km^{2})

Population (2020)
  - Total: 161
  - Density: 4.3/sq mi (1.7/km^{2})
- Time zone: UTC-6 (CST)
  - Summer (DST): UTC-5 (CDT)
- FIPS code: 17-167-74340

Talkington Township is a township in Sangamon County, Illinois. As of the 2020 US census, its population was 161 and it contained 70 housing units. Located on high ground in the southwest corner of the county, on what was formerly open prairie, it was settled late and has remained largely agricultural. There are no incorporated communities in the township. The township is crossed by one state highway and a railroad that serves two active grain elevators.

== History ==
The original landscape of the township was entirely prairie, and was remote from any sources of timber. As a result, the township was settled later than much of Sangamon County.

Talkington Township was officially established in 1861, when Sangamon County adopted township boundaries, after the voters had approved township organization by a referendum the preceding year. It took its name from a settler named Job Talkington. It was designated to cover the entire survey township of Township 13 North Range 7 West, as well as portions of Township 13 North Range 8 West within Sangamon County. Livestock farming dominated early land use in the township.

In 1872, the Jacksonville, Northwestern and Southeastern Railway was built through the township, financed in part by $20,000 in bonds issued by the township government. A station was established at Lowder, roughly halfway between the stations at Virden and Waverly, Illinois. Lowder quickly attracted businesses and a post office. The completion of the railroad marked a point at which every farmer in the Sugar Creek watershed, which takes up most of southern Sangamon County, was within six miles of a train station.

In 2020, the electric utility Ameren completed the Illinois Rivers Project, which included upgraded transmission lines along the township's southern and a portion of its western border. In 2021, Sangamon County granted zoning approval for a 593-megawatt solar farm, named Double Black Diamond, over local opposition. The project covered 4100 acres in southwestern Talkington Township and adjacent areas of Morgan County. It began operation in 2025, supplying renewable power to consumers including the Chicago city government and Loyola University. According to operator Swift Current Energy, at the time it started operation, Double Black Diamond was the largest solar facility east of the Mississippi River.

In 2025, CyrusOne announced plans to build a large data center in Talkington Township, adjacent to the Double Black Diamond solar farm. In July of that year, the Sangamon County Board approved a process by which land zoned for agricultural use could be approved to host industrial uses through a conditional use permit. In 2026, over opposition, the Sangamon County Board approved a conditional use permit for the data center. The vote split the board 17-10, with the opposing votes including the council member whose district included the township.

== Geography ==
According to the 2020 census, the township has a total area of 37.51 square miles (97.2 km^{2}), all land. The township's sole community is Lowder, which is unincorporated.

The township lies on higher ground than the rest of Sangamon County. The county's highest point is located in the township, more than 710 feet (220 m) above sea level.

Much of the township is in the Lick Creek watershed, which drains to the Sangamon River via Lake Springfield and Sugar Creek. Sugar Creek itself rises in southwestern Talkington Township, then runs southeast into Macoupin County before returning to Sangamon County further east. Other streams that drain portions of the township include Apple Creek, which rises in the township and drains to the Illinois River, and Otter Creek, which drains to the Macoupin.

=== Adjacent townships ===
The following townships or road districts adjoin Talkington Township:

- Maxwell Township (north)
- Loami Township (north)
- Chatham Township (northeast)
- Auburn Township (east)
- Virden Township, Macoupin County (southeast)
- North Otter Township, Macoupin County (south)
- North Palmyra Township (southwest)
- Road District 13 (Waverly), Morgan County (west)

== Demographics ==
Historical population
Census	Pop.	Note	%±
1870	973		—
1880	1,064		9.4%
1890	923		−13.3%
1900	896		−2.9%
1910	821		−8.4%
1920	751		−8.5%
1930	699		−6.9%
1940	637		−8.9%
1950	548		−14.0%
1960	487		−11.1%
1970	316		−35.1%
1980	319		0.9%
1990	257		−19.4%
2000	263		2.3%
2010	189		−28.1%
2020	161		−14.8%
U.S. Decennial Census

As of the 2020 census, the township had a population of 161. The median age was 45.8 years. 21.1% of residents were under the age of 18 and 20.5% of residents were 65 years of age or older. The population was 51.6% male and 48.4% female.

The racial makeup of the township was 90.7% White, 0.6% Black or African American, 0.6% American Indian and Alaska Native, 0.0% Asian, 0.0% Native Hawaiian and Pacific Islander, 2.5% from some other race, and 5.6% from two or more races. Hispanic or Latino residents of any race comprised 3.7% of the population.

== Education ==
The township is divided between two school districts, Waverly Community Unit School District 6 and North Mac Community Unit School District 34. Both districts' schools are located in adjoining counties, Morgan and Macoupin respectively.

The township's first school was established in 1851. In the early 20th century, the township had six schools.

== Government ==
The elected officials of Talkington Township consist of a clerk, supervisor, highway commissioner, and four trustees. As of the 2025-2029 cycle, all of these positions except clerk are filled by members of the Republican Party. The elected officials formerly also included a township tax collector, but this position was abolished in Sangamon County by a 2017 state law.

The role of township assessor is not elected, but instead is filled contractually for a multi-township assessment unit that also includes nearby Maxwell and Loami townships. This multi-township arrangement was mandated by a law adopted by the 81st Illinois General Assembly in 1979 under which all townships with populations under 1,000 were required to consolidate assessments with another township.

== Transportation ==
The township is served by one state highway, Illinois Route 104, which runs east to west across the township. It is also served by Sangamon County highways 6, 10, 45, and 52. The other roads in the township are township roads maintained by the township road district, which total 44.81 miles. The township road district also maintains nine bridges.

The BNSF Railroad traverses the township along the former alignment of the Jacksonville, Northwestern and Southeastern Railroad, and serves two grain terminals in the township. The grain elevator at Lowder was established in 1905 by the Farmers Elevator Company and was purchased in 2010 by CHS Inc. A grain elevator to the northwest of Lowder is owned by Scoular.
