= Bois D'Arc Township, Montgomery County, Illinois =

Bois D'Arc Township
- Township

- Location of Illinois in the United States
- Coordinates: 39°28′N 89°38′W
- Country: United States
- State: Illinois
- County: Montgomery
- Established: November 5, 1872

Area
  - Total: 54.62 sq mi (141.5 km^{2})
  - Land: 54.56 sq mi (141.3 km^{2})
  - Water: 0.06 sq mi (0.16 km^{2})
- Elevation: 646 ft (197 m)

Population (2010)
  - Estimate (2016): 917
  - Density: 17.5/sq mi (6.8/km^{2})
- Time zone: UTC-6 (CST)
  - Summer (DST): UTC-5 (CDT)
- FIPS code: 17-135-07107

Bois D'Arc Township (T12N W½R4+R5W) is located in Montgomery County, Illinois, United States. As of the 2010 census, its population was 956 and it contained 451 housing units.

== History ==
The township takes its name from the bois d'arc or hedgeapple, due to local farmer Lewis Thomas having created an early example of a hedgeapple hedge at his farm in the township in 1851. Prior to the adoption of township government, the land in the township was part of the Zanesville Precinct. Montgomery County voters approved township government at the general election on November 5, 1872, and the county's townships were formally organized in 1873.

== Geography ==
According to the 2010 census, the township has a total area of 54.62 square miles (141.5 km^{2}), of which 54.56 square miles (141.3 km^{2}) (or 99.89%) is land and 0.06 square miles (0.16 km^{2}) (or 0.11%) is water.

== Demographics ==
Historical population
Census	Pop.	Note	%±
2016 (est.)	917
U.S. Decennial Census

== Adjacent townships ==
- Divernon Township, Sangamon County (north)
- Pawnee Township, Sangamon County (north)
- South Fork Township, Christian County (northeast)
- King Township, Christian County (east)
- Harvel Township (southeast)
- Pitman Township (south)
- Nilwood Township, Macoupin County (southwest)
- Girard Township (west)
- Virden Township (west)
- Auburn Township, Sangamon County (northwest)
