= Harvel (disambiguation) =

Harvel is a village in Kent, England.

Harvel may also refer to:

- Harvel, Illinois, a village in Illinois, United States
- Harvel Township, Montgomery County, Illinois

== People with the surname ==
- Edmund Harvel, 16th-century English diplomat
- Luther Harvel (1905–1986), American baseball player, scout and manager
