= Sugar Creek (Sangamon River tributary) =

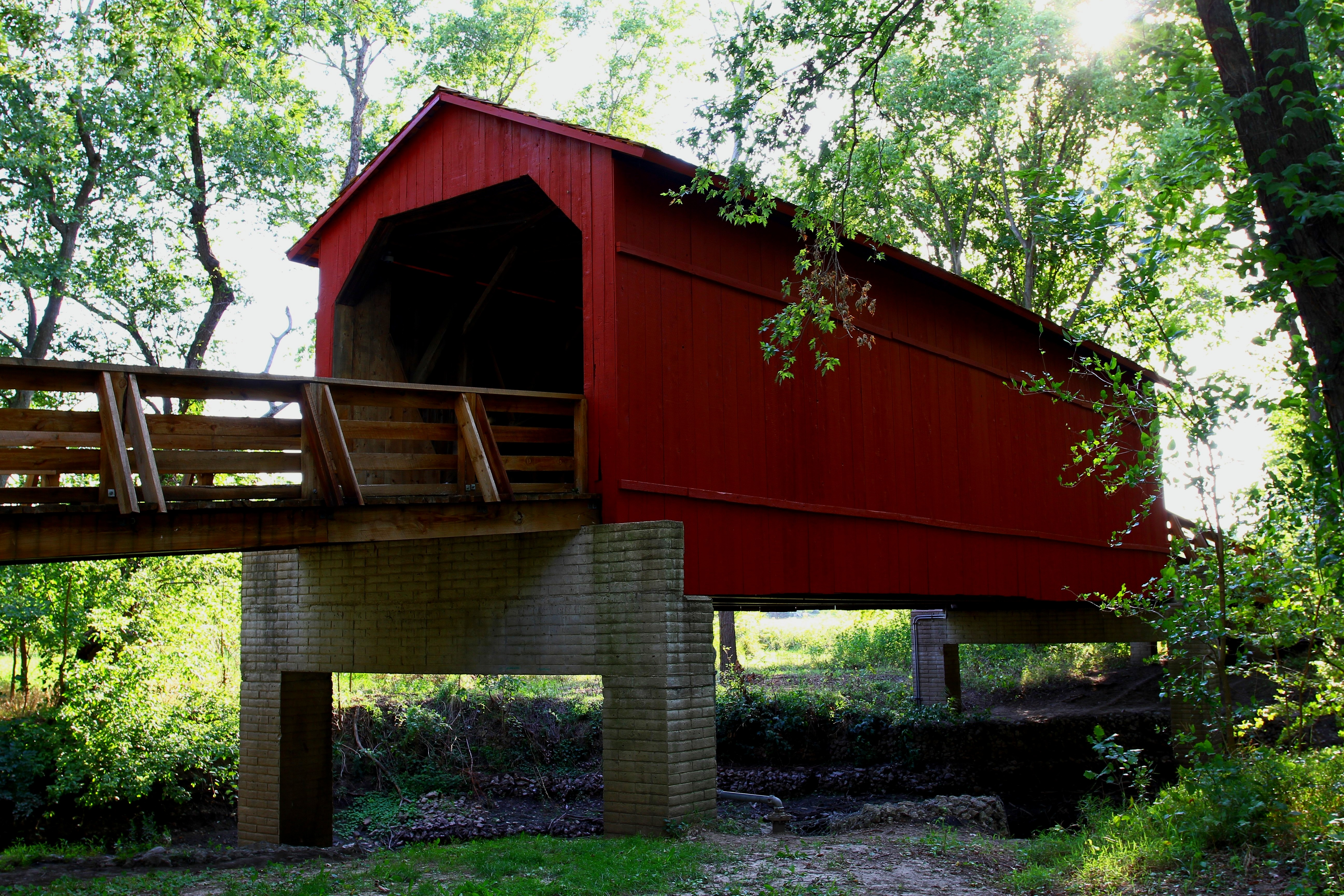

Physical characteristics
- Source
  - location: Sangamon County southeast of Waverly, Illinois
  - coordinates: 39°32′37″N 89°55′11″W
- Mouth
  - location: Confluence with the Sangamon east of Springfield, Illinois
  - coordinates: 39°48′40″N 89°32′33″W
  - elevation: 518 ft (158 m)
- Length: 53 mi (85 km)

Basin features
- Progression: Sugar Creek → Sangamon → Illinois → Mississippi → Gulf of Mexico
- GNIS ID: 419267

Sugar Creek, a tributary of the Sangamon River, is a large creek in central Illinois, United States. It rises in Talkington Township in southwestern Sangamon County, flows briefly through northeastern Macoupin County, and then runs northeastward through south-central Sangamon County before discharging into Lake Springfield. The creek drains Auburn and Virden, Illinois and has a total length of 52.8 miles (85.0 km).

== History ==
In the early 1800s, Sugar Creek offered a habitat for one of the southernmost groves of sugar maples in Illinois Territory. This fact, and the fertility of the surrounding prairie land, made the Sugar Creek drainage a focus of interest for early American pioneers immediately after the end of the War of 1812. A six-member kinship group led by Robert Pulliam built homestead cabins on the creek in 1817 near what is now the unincorporated suburban village of Glenarm. Many pioneers followed Pulliam's group to Sugar Creek in the 1820s and following years, helping to settle central Illinois and building a community of primarily southern heritage.

In 1880, township authorities built a Burr arch covered bridge, the Sugar Creek Covered Bridge, going east–west over Sugar Creek near the site of the original sugar maple grove and Robert Pulliam's long-vanished cabin. The covered bridge has a span of 60 feet (18 m). As of 2008, the covered bridge is one of only four covered bridges remaining in Illinois that are classified as original. The bridge has been rebuilt several times, reusing the original timbers. The bridge was added to the National Register of Historic Places in 1978.
