= Lowder, Illinois =

- Unincorporated community
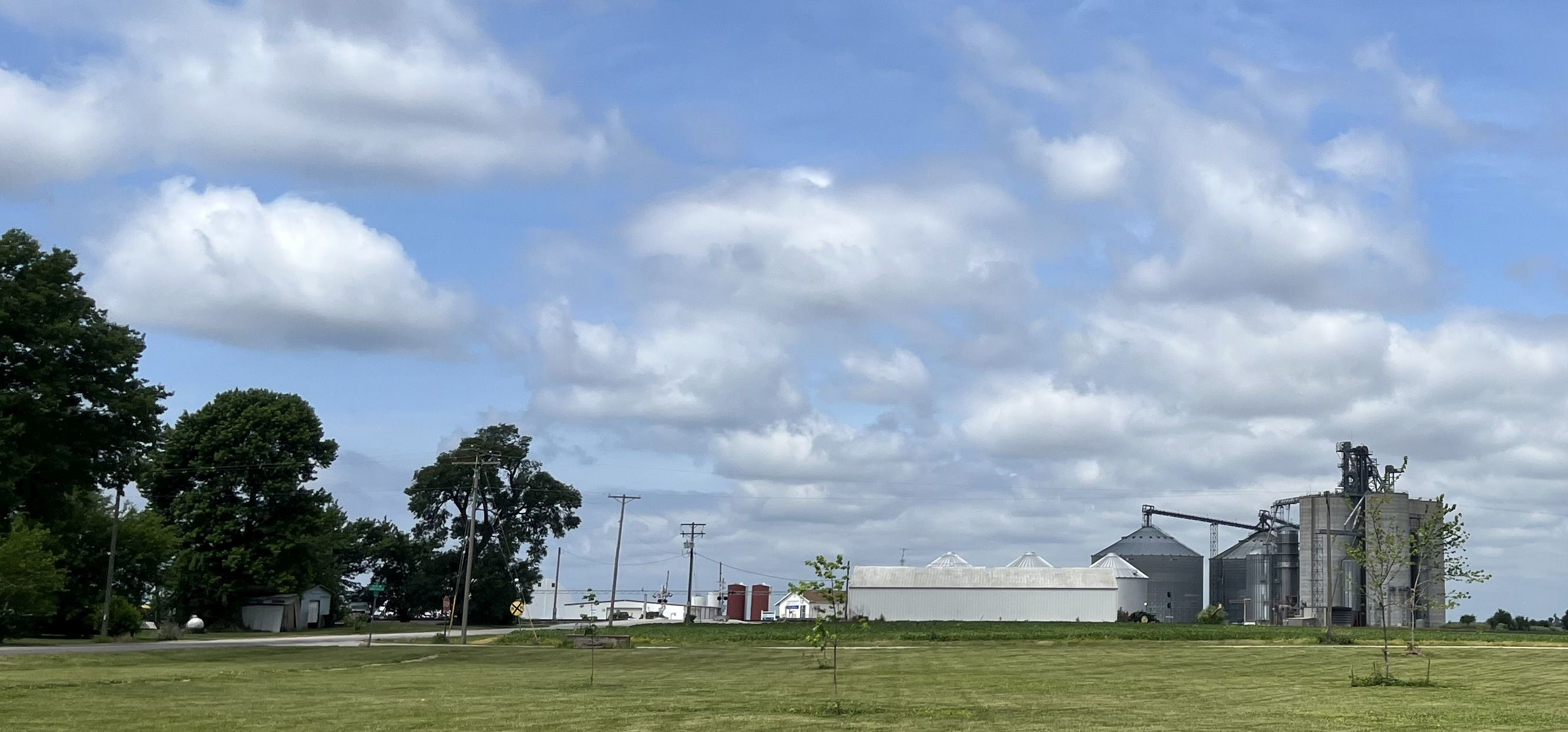
- Northwest edge of Lowder with CHS grain elevator.

- Location within Illinois Location within the United States
- Coordinates: 39°33′03″N 89°50′45″W
- Country: United States
- State: Illinois
- County: Sangamon
- Township: Talkington
- Elevation: 692 ft (211 m)
- Time zone: UTC-6 (Central (CST))
  - Summer (DST): UTC-5 (CDT)
- ZIP code: 62662
- Area code: 217
- GNIS feature ID: 412703

Lowder is an unincorporated community in Talkington Township, Sangamon County, Illinois, United States. Lowder is located along a railroad line 5.5 miles (8.9 km) northwest of Virden. Lowder had a post office, which closed on October 24, 2010.
