= Charles Linnaeus Ives =

American physician

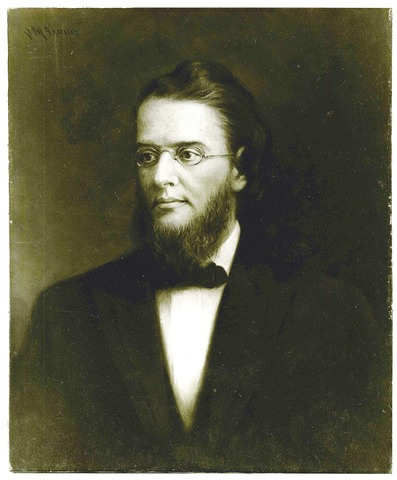
Charles Linnaeus Ives

Charles Linnaeus Ives (June 22, 1831 – March 21, 1879) was an American medical doctor. He was a professor of the theory and practice of medicine at Yale School of Medicine from 1868 to 1873.

== Early life and education ==
Ives, the only child of Dr. N. Beers Ives and Sarah (Badger) Ives, was born in New Haven, Conn., June 22, 1831.

He graduated from Yale College in 1852. He attended two courses of lectures at the Jefferson Medical College in Philadelphia, where he received the degree of M.D. in 1854. He then attended a supplementary course at the College of Physicians and Surgeons, N. Y. City.

== Career ==
Ives remained as a resident surgeon at the Bellevue Hospital until April, 1856, when he entered on the practice of his profession in New Haven. From 1864 to 1868 he was partially engaged in teaching medicine in connection with the Yale Medical School, and in the latter year was appointed to the chair of the Theory and Practice of Medicine in this institution.

In 1873, hoping to better his health by a change of locality, he resigned this professorship to accept the chair of Diseases of the Mind and Nervous System, in the University of the City of New York. To prepare for this he made a second visit to Europe (having already made an extended tour in 1870), but failing health compelled him to resign this professorship also, and to give up entirely his profession.

Dr. Ives published in 1873 a pamphlet on the Bible Doctrine of the Soul, which in 1877 he re-published in a duodecimo of 334 pages.

== Personal life and legacy ==
The rest of his life was spent in travel and the search for health. In March, 1879, he underwent a surgical operation, in consequence of which he died in Burlington, N. J., on the 21st of that month.

He was married, June 20, 1860, to Miss Bessie W. Salter, daughter of Cleveland J Salter, of Waverly, Illinois, who survived him. They had no children.

By his last will he left to the president and fellows of Yale College the sum of $10,000, of which the income is to devoted to the support of indigent and worthy students. He was also during his life a generous benefactor of the Yale Medical School.
