= Virden Township, Macoupin County, Illinois =

Virden Township
- Township

- Location of Illinois in the United States
- Coordinates: 39°30′N 89°46′W
- Country: United States
- State: Illinois
- County: Macoupin
- Settled: November 1, 1870

Area
  - Total: 18.01 sq mi (46.6 km^{2})
  - Land: 17.98 sq mi (46.6 km^{2})
  - Water: 0.04 sq mi (0.10 km^{2}) 0.20%
- Elevation: 669 ft (204 m)

Population (2020)
  - Total: 3,339
  - Density: 185.7/sq mi (71.70/km^{2})
- Time zone: UTC-6 (CST)
  - Summer (DST): UTC-5 (CDT)
- FIPS code: 17-117-78162

Virden Township (N½ T12N R6W) is located in Macoupin County, Illinois, United States. As of the 2020 census, its population was 3,339 and it contained 1,660 housing units.

== Geography ==
According to the 2021 census gazetteer files, Virden Township has a total area of 18.01 square miles (46.65 km^{2}), of which 17.98 square miles (46.57 km^{2}) (or 99.80%) is land and 0.04 square miles (0.10 km^{2}) (or 0.20%) is water.

== Demographics ==
As of the 2020 census there were 3,339 people, 1,522 households, and 901 families residing in the township. The population density was 185.38 inhabitants per square mile (71.58/km^{2}). There were 1,660 housing units at an average density of 92.16 per square mile (35.58/km^{2}). The racial makeup of the township was 95.30% White, 0.66% African American, 0.03% Native American, 0.57% Asian, 0.00% Pacific Islander, 0.54% from other races, and 2.91% from two or more races. Hispanic or Latino of any race were 1.29% of the population.

There were 1,522 households, out of which 28.40% had children under the age of 18 living with them, 39.03% were married couples living together, 16.10% had a female householder with no spouse present, and 40.80% were non-families. 31.20% of all households were made up of individuals, and 14.50% had someone living alone who was 65 years of age or older. The average household size was 2.25 and the average family size was 2.86.

According to the 2020 American Community Survey, township's age distribution consisted of 21.2% under the age of 18, 5.2% from 18 to 24, 27.7% from 25 to 44, 27% from 45 to 64, and 18.8% who were 65 years of age or older. The median age was 42.0 years. For every 100 females, there were 93 males. For every 100 females age 18 and over, there were 92 males.

The median income for a household in the township was $58,690, and the median income for a family was $69,375. Males had a median income of $47,031 versus $26,633 for females. The per capita income for the township was $29,133. About 7.5% of families and 10.6% of the population were below the poverty line, including 11.3% of those under age 18 and 6.2% of those age 65 or over.

Historical population
| Census | Pop. | Note | %± |
|---|---|---|---|
| 2000 | 3,689 | | — |
| 2010 | 3,671 | | −0.5% |
| 2020 | 3,339 | | −9.0% |
U.S. Decennial Census

== Adjacent townships ==
- Auburn Township, Sangamon County (north)
- Divernon Township, Sangamon County (northeast)
- Bois D'Arc Township, Montgomery County (east)
- Girard Township (south)
- North Otter Township (west)
- Talkington Township, Sangamon County (northwest)
