= Lanesville Township, Sangamon County, Illinois =

Coordinates: 39°50′25″N 89°20′09″W

Lanesville Township
- Township
- Location in Sangamon County

- Sangamon County's location in Illinois
- Country: United States
- State: Illinois
- County: Sangamon
- Established: 1875

Government
  - Supervisor: Charles K. Kilhoffer

Area
  - Total: 36.21 sq mi (93.8 km^{2})
  - Land: 36.21 sq mi (93.8 km^{2})
  - Water: 0 sq mi (0 km^{2}) 0%

Population (2010)
  - Estimate (2016): 205
  - Density: 5.7/sq mi (2.2/km^{2})
- Time zone: UTC-6 (CST)
  - Summer (DST): UTC-5 (CDT)
- FIPS code: 17-167-41976

Lanesville Township is located in Sangamon County, Illinois. As of the 2010 census, its population was 208 and it contained 84 housing units. Lanesville Township formed from Illiopolis Township in 1875 under the name of Wheatfield, which was subsequently changed to Lanesville.

It comprises parts of government townships 15, 16 and 17 north, range 2 west, and is bounded on the east by Illiopolis Township, south by the Sangamon River, west by Mechanicsburg Township and Buffalo Hart Township Buffalo Hart and north by Logan County.

== Schools ==
Lanesville Township is served by three school districts:

- Tri-City Community Unit School District 1 - - district website
- Sangamon Valley Community Unit School District 9 - - district website
- Mt. Pulaski Community Unit District 23 - - district website

== Geography ==
According to the 2010 census, the township has a total area of 36.21 square miles (93.8 km^{2}), all land.

== Demographics ==
Historical population
| Census | Pop. | Note | %± |
|---|---|---|---|
| 2016 (est.) | 205 |
U.S. Decennial Census
