= Barr, Illinois =

Barr, Illinois may refer to:

- Barr, Macoupin County, Illinois, an unincorporated community in Macoupin County
- Barr, Sangamon County, Illinois, an unincorporated community in Sangamon County
