= North Otter Township, Macoupin County, Illinois =

North Otter Township
- Township

- Location of Illinois in the United States
- Coordinates: 39°29′N 89°52′W
- Country: United States
- State: Illinois
- County: Macoupin
- Settled: November 1, 1870

Area
  - Total: 36.39 sq mi (94.2 km^{2})
  - Land: 35.71 sq mi (92.5 km^{2})
  - Water: 0.68 sq mi (1.8 km^{2}) 1.86%
- Elevation: 659 ft (201 m)

Population (2020)
  - Total: 781
  - Density: 21.9/sq mi (8.44/km^{2})
- Time zone: UTC-6 (CST)
  - Summer (DST): UTC-5 (CDT)
- FIPS code: 17-117-54040

North Otter Township (T12N R7W) is located in Macoupin County, Illinois, United States. As of the 2020 census, its population was 781 and it contained 433 housing units.

== Geography ==
According to the 2021 census gazetteer files, North Otter Township has a total area of 36.39 square miles (94.25 km^{2}), of which 35.71 square miles (92.49 km^{2}) (or 98.14%) is land and 0.68 square miles (1.76 km^{2}) (or 1.86%) is water.

== Demographics ==
As of the 2020 census there were 781 people, 259 households, and 230 families residing in the township. The population density was 21.46 inhabitants per square mile (8.29/km^{2}). There were 433 housing units at an average density of 11.90 per square mile (4.59/km^{2}). The racial makeup of the township was 97.57% White, 0.77% African American, 0.00% Native American, 0.00% Asian, 0.00% Pacific Islander, 0.00% from other races, and 1.66% from two or more races. Hispanic or Latino of any race were 0.38% of the population.

There were 259 households, out of which 23.60% had children under the age of 18 living with them, 78.76% were married couples living together, 10.04% had a female householder with no spouse present, and 11.20% were non-families. 11.20% of all households were made up of individuals, and 8.50% had someone living alone who was 65 years of age or older. The average household size was 2.41 and the average family size was 2.54.

According to the 2020 American Community Survey, township's age distribution consisted of 15.0% under the age of 18, 6.2% from 18 to 24, 19.1% from 25 to 44, 40.5% from 45 to 64, and 19.0% who were 65 years of age or older. The median age was 47.7 years. For every 100 females, there were 110.5 males. For every 100 females age 18 and over, there were 103 males.

The median income for a household in the township was $108,750, and the median income for a family was $122,738. Males had a median income of $54,531 versus $55,167 for females. The per capita income for the township was $39,502. About 0.0% of families and 1.8% of the population were below the poverty line, including 0.0% of those under age 18 and 0.0% of those age 65 or over.

Historical population
Census	Pop.	Note	%±
2000	840		—
2010	816		−2.9%
2020	781		−4.3%
U.S. Decennial Census

== Adjacent townships ==
- Talkington Township, Sangamon County (north)
- Auburn Township, Sangamon County (northeast)
- Virden Township (east)
- Girard Township (east)
- Nilwood Township (southeast)
- South Otter Township (south)
- South Palmyra Township (southwest)
- North Palmyra Township (west)

To the northwest, Morgan County, Illinois is divided into administrative precincts, or road districts, rather than townships. North Otter Township is bordered in Morgan County by Road District 13, which is also known as Waverly.
