= Buckhart =

Buckhart may refer to:

- Buckhart, Illinois, an unincorporated community in Sangamon County
- Buckhart, Missouri, an unincorporated community in Douglas County
