= Clear Lake, Illinois =

Clear Lake
- Former village
- Clearlake
- Location of Clear Lake in Sangamon County, Illinois.

- Location of Illinois in the United States
- Coordinates: 39°48′51″N 89°34′1″W
- Country: United States
- State: Illinois
- County: Sangamon
- Township: Clear Lake
- Incorporated: 1955
- Dissolved: 2022

Area
  - Total: 0.093 sq mi (0.24 km^{2})
  - Land: 0.093 sq mi (0.24 km^{2})
  - Water: 0 sq mi (0.00 km^{2})

Population (2020)
  - Total: 203
  - Density: 2,207.3/sq mi (852.26/km^{2})
- Time zone: UTC-6 (CST)
  - Summer (DST): UTC-5 (CDT)
- Area code: 217
- FIPS code: 17-14845

Clear Lake is an unincorporated community and former incorporated village in Sangamon County, Illinois, United States. As of the 2020 census, Clear Lake had a population of 203. It is part of the Springfield, Illinois Metropolitan Statistical Area.

== History ==
Camp Butler National Cemetery is located just to the north of Clear Lake. There is also a body of water located in the village called Clear Lake. Civil War-era Camp Butler’s training and mustering grounds were on the banks of and close to Clear Lake. As an isolated, sand-bottom lake, it provided relatively clean water for the troops and horses. After the Civil War this was a popular recreation area for many in the Springfield area. Clear Lake declined in importance after the larger Lake Springfield was built in the 1930s. The lake was bought by the City of Springfield in the 2000s as a backup water source.

George Donner, of the infamous Donner Party, lived in the Clear Lake area with his family and is buried at Oak Hill cemetery in Clear Lake.

The village of Clear Lake was incorporated by referendum in 1955. The first slate of officers were all members of a new political party known as the Clear Lake Independents, and ran unopposed.

The village was dissolved by referendum in 2022 (by which time it was officially known as "Clearlake"). Government services were taken over by Clear Lake Township and Sangamon County. The dissolution referendum passed by an overwhelming margin, with only 2 out of 38 votes opposed. It followed an earlier referendum in 2015 that failed by two votes, 19 to 17.

== Geography ==
Clear Lake is located at 39°48′51″N 89°34′1″W (39.814177, -89.566965).

Clear Lake is located northeast of Springfield, southwest of Riverton, and immediately west of the Sangamon River.

== Education ==
Residents of Clear Lake are in the Riverton Community Unit School District.

== Transportation ==
Clear Lake is located just to the northeast of the Interstate 55/Interstate 72 interchange near Springfield. Old US Route 36 runs directly through the village. Illinois Route 54 is located a few miles north of the village.

== Notable Places ==
The Oaks Golf Course (formerly Oak Crest Country Club)

Gravel Pits (backup water supply for Springfield)

Devil's hole fishing area

Old Sangamon River Bridge

Roselawn and Oak Hill Cemetery

Sugar Creek

Sangamon River

Clear Lake

== Demographics ==
Historical population
Census	Pop.	Note	%±
1960	219		—
1970	228		4.1%
1980	236		3.5%
1990	193		−18.2%
2000	267		38.3%
2010	229		−14.2%
2020	203		−11.4%
U.S. Decennial Census

As of the census of 2000, there were 267 people, 104 households, and 79 families residing in the village. The population density was 2,871.8 inhabitants per square mile (1,108.8/km^{2}). There were 111 housing units at an average density of 1,193.9 per square mile (461.0/km^{2}). The racial makeup of the village was 96.25% White, 1.12% African American, 1.12% Asian, 0.75% from other races, and 0.75% from two or more races. Hispanic or Latino of any race were 1.87% of the population.

There were 104 households, out of which 35.6% had children under the age of 18 living with them, 53.8% were married couples living together, 13.5% had a female householder with no husband present, and 23.1% were non-families. 22.1% of all households were made up of individuals, and 9.6% had someone living alone who was 65 years of age or older. The average household size was 2.57 and the average family size was 2.90.

In the village, the population was spread out, with 27.0% under the age of 18, 4.5% from 18 to 24, 32.2% from 25 to 44, 25.1% from 45 to 64, and 11.2% who were 65 years of age or older. The median age was 39 years. For every 100 females, there were 89.4 males. For every 100 females age 18 and over, there were 89.3 males.

The median income for a household in the village was $37,708, and the median income for a family was $40,536. Males had a median income of $35,625 versus $30,278 for females. The per capita income for the village was $15,284. About 18.4% of families and 14.1% of the population were below the poverty line, including 24.6% of those under the age of eighteen and 22.9% of those 65 or over.
