= Girard Township, Macoupin County, Illinois =

Girard Township
- Township

- Location of Illinois in the United States
- Coordinates: 39°27′N 89°45′W
- Country: United States
- State: Illinois
- County: Macoupin
- Settled: Unknown

Area
  - Total: 18.07 sq mi (46.8 km^{2})
  - Land: 18.07 sq mi (46.8 km^{2})
  - Water: 0 sq mi (0 km^{2}) 0%
- Elevation: 673 ft (205 m)

Population (2020)
  - Total: 2,141
  - Density: 118.5/sq mi (45.75/km^{2})
- Time zone: UTC-6 (CST)
  - Summer (DST): UTC-5 (CDT)
- FIPS code: 17-117-29405

Girard Township (S½ T12N R6W) is located in Macoupin County, Illinois, United States. As of the 2020 census, its population was 2,141 and it contained 1,048 housing units.

== History ==
Girard Township is named for Stephen Girard. The city of Girard is within the geographic borders of the township but politically separate.

== Geography ==
According to the 2021 census gazetteer files, Girard Township has a total area of 18.07 square miles (46.80 km^{2}), all land.

== Demographics ==
As of the 2020 census there were 2,141 people, 886 households, and 650 families residing in the township. The population density was 118.50 inhabitants per square mile (45.75/km^{2}). There were 1,048 housing units at an average density of 58.01 per square mile (22.40/km^{2}). The racial makeup of the township was 92.53% White, 0.61% African American, 0.37% Native American, 0.28% Asian, 0.00% Pacific Islander, 0.09% from other races, and 6.12% from two or more races. Hispanic or Latino of any race were 1.54% of the population.

There were 886 households, out of which 33.10% had children under the age of 18 living with them, 47.74% were married couples living together, 18.17% had a female householder with no spouse present, and 26.64% were non-families. 25.60% of all households were made up of individuals, and 14.80% had someone living alone who was 65 years of age or older. The average household size was 2.43 and the average family size was 2.75.

According to the 2020 American Community Survey, township's age distribution consisted of 23.3% under the age of 18, 7.8% from 18 to 24, 24.7% from 25 to 44, 21.8% from 45 to 64, and 22.4% who were 65 years of age or older. The median age was 35.9 years. For every 100 females, there were 92.9 males. For every 100 females age 18 and over, there were 90.4 males.

The median income for a household in the township was $46,596, and the median income for a family was $49,167. Males had a median income of $31,786 versus $25,323 for females. The per capita income for the township was $23,468. About 11.8% of families and 12.7% of the population were below the poverty line, including 12.7% of those under age 18 and 2.6% of those age 65 or over.

Historical population
Census	Pop.	Note	%±
2000	2,582		—
2010	2,466		−4.5%
2020	2,141		−13.2%
U.S. Decennial Census

== Adjacent townships ==
- Virden Township (north)
- Bois D'Arc Township, Montgomery County (east)
- Pitman Township, Montgomery County (southeast)
- Nilwood Township (south)
- South Otter Township (southwest)
- North Otter Township (west)
