= Virden, Illinois =

- City
- Location in Macoupin and Sangamon counties, Illinois
- Coordinates: 39°30′22″N 89°46′16″W
- Country: United States
- State: Illinois
- Counties: Macoupin, Sangamon
- Townships: Virden, Auburn

Area
  - Total: 1.89 sq mi (4.89 km^{2})
  - Land: 1.89 sq mi (4.89 km^{2})
  - Water: 0 sq mi (0.00 km^{2})
- Elevation: 676 ft (206 m)

Population (2020)
  - Total: 3,231
  - Density: 1,710.5/sq mi (660.43/km^{2})
- Time zone: UTC-6 (CST)
  - Summer (DST): UTC-5 (CDT)
- ZIP code: 62690
- Area code: 217
- FIPS code: 17-78149
- GNIS feature ID: 2397150
- Website: virden.municipalimpact.com

Virden is a city in Macoupin and Sangamon counties in the U.S. state of Illinois. The population was 3,231 at the 2020 census.

The Macoupin County portion of Virden is part of Greater St. Louis, while the Sangamon County portion is part of the Springfield, Illinois metropolitan area.

Virden was the scene of an 1898 coal miners' strike, during which Mary Harris "Mother" Jones played a major role.

== History ==
Virden sits atop a large seam of coal. After the 1850s, when the Chicago and Alton Railroad was completed, it became possible to mine Virden coal and ship it long distances for a profit. Throughout the second half of the 1800s, Virden prospered and grew as a coal-mining town.

A bitter coal strike broke out in 1898. The Chicago-Virden Coal Company, fearing loss of key business in Chicago, refused to allow its Virden mines to be unionized, nor would it pay the nonunionized miners union-scale wages. Instead, the coal company built a timber stockade around its mine head, adjoining the railroad tracks, and hired African Americans from Southern states as coal miners. The Chicago-Virden Company knew that African Americans, who were attempting to escape Jim Crow labor conditions, would not request union-scale wages. Instead, the company promised to pay their new workers by the ton. The new miners were promised only 30 cents per ton of coal mined.

The appearance of the African-American miners infuriated the strikers. They were motivated by racism, by labor solidarity, and by the desire to create decent lives for their own families. Some of the striking coal miners were themselves African-American, and black coal miners who were union members in good standing were apparently accepted by their unionized white comrades. However, this acceptance did not extend to strikebreakers.

=== Battle of Virden ===
On October 12, 1898, a northbound train, loaded with potential strikebreaking miners, pulled into Virden and stopped on the tracks just outside the minehead stockade. The mine manager and train operator, knowing there would be trouble, had reinforced the train with a troop of security guards, armed with Winchester rifles. It soon became clear that the security guards had been either ordered, or allowed, to shoot to kill. As the strikers attempted to surround the train, the guards opened fire.

As a gun battle broke out in and around the strikebreakers' train, there were dead and wounded on both sides. Of the thirteen dead, six were security guards. Furthermore, had the strikers won the battle, their intentions toward the Alabama strikebreakers were not friendly. After twenty minutes of firing on both sides, the train's engineer accepted defeat and the engine and part of the train pulled away from the minehead and continued northward to Springfield.

A monument in the Virden town square commemorates the coal strike of 1898 and the battle of October 12 that was its bitter end. The monument contains a large bronze bas-relief that includes the names of those killed, and a copy of a mendacious recruiting handbill distributed by the Chicago-Virden Company in Birmingham, Alabama, to recruit the African-American miners. The body of the bas-relief is made of symbolic representations of the Chicago & Alton tracks and the assault on the strikers. The guards are shown pointing their Winchesters at the strikers and their families. Atop the bas-relief is a bronze portrait of Mary Harris Jones ("Mother Jones"), who is buried in nearby Mount Olive.

== Geography ==
Most of the city lies in the northeast corner of Macoupin County, with a small portion extending north into Sangamon County. In the 2000 census, 3,378 of the city's 3,488 residents (96.8%) lived in Macoupin County and 110 (3.2%) lived in Sangamon County.

Illinois Route 4 passes through the city as Springfield Street, leading southwest 18 miles (29 km) to Carlinville, the Macoupin county seat, and northeast 22 miles (35 km) to Springfield, the state capital.

According to the U.S. Census Bureau, Virden has a total area of 1.89 square miles (4.90 km^{2}), all land. The city drains west to Sugar Creek and east to its tributary Brush Creek. Both creeks flow to the northeast, with Sugar Creek joining the Sangamon River, a tributary of the Illinois River, east of Springfield.

=== Climate ===
Climate data for Virden, Illinois (1991–2020)
Month	Jan	Feb	Mar	Apr	May	Jun	Jul	Aug	Sep	Oct	Nov	Dec	Year
Mean daily maximum °F (°C)	36.3 (2.4)	41.5 (5.3)	53.5 (11.9)	66.8 (19.3)	75.5 (24.2)	83.4 (28.6)	86.9 (30.5)	85.2 (29.6)	79.9 (26.6)	67.4 (19.7)	52.2 (11.2)	40.8 (4.9)	64.1 (17.8)
Daily mean °F (°C)	28.6 (−1.9)	33.1 (0.6)	43.9 (6.6)	56.1 (13.4)	65.3 (18.5)	74.0 (23.3)	77.2 (25.1)	75.5 (24.2)	69.1 (20.6)	57.3 (14.1)	43.8 (6.6)	33.6 (0.9)	54.8 (12.7)
Mean daily minimum °F (°C)	20.9 (−6.2)	24.8 (−4.0)	34.4 (1.3)	45.3 (7.4)	55.2 (12.9)	64.7 (18.2)	67.6 (19.8)	65.8 (18.8)	58.2 (14.6)	47.3 (8.5)	35.3 (1.8)	26.4 (−3.1)	45.5 (7.5)
Average precipitation inches (mm)	1.97 (50)	2.27 (58)	2.54 (65)	4.23 (107)	4.19 (106)	4.29 (109)	3.46 (88)	3.09 (78)	3.42 (87)	3.39 (86)	3.10 (79)	2.41 (61)	38.36 (974)
Average snowfall inches (cm)	6.7 (17)	3.1 (7.9)	2.3 (5.8)	0.0 (0.0)	0.0 (0.0)	0.0 (0.0)	0.0 (0.0)	0.0 (0.0)	0.0 (0.0)	0.0 (0.0)	0.7 (1.8)	3.3 (8.4)	16.1 (40.9)
Source: NOAA

== Demographics ==
Historical population
Census	Pop.	Note	%±
1880	1,608		—
1890	1,610		0.1%
1900	2,280		41.6%
1910	4,000		75.4%
1920	4,682		17.1%
1930	3,011		−35.7%
1940	3,041		1.0%
1950	3,206		5.4%
1960	3,309		3.2%
1970	3,504		5.9%
1980	3,899		11.3%
1990	3,635		−6.8%
2000	3,488		−4.0%
2010	3,425		−1.8%
2020	3,231		−5.7%
U.S. Decennial Census

=== 2020 census ===
As of the 2020 census, Virden had a population of 3,231. The median age was 42.5 years. 21.2% of residents were under the age of 18 and 21.5% of residents were 65 years of age or older. For every 100 females there were 92.0 males, and for every 100 females age 18 and over there were 90.9 males age 18 and over.

0.0% of residents lived in urban areas, while 100.0% lived in rural areas.

There were 1,399 households in Virden, of which 27.1% had children under the age of 18 living in them. Of all households, 40.5% were married-couple households, 20.2% were households with a male householder and no spouse or partner present, and 30.3% were households with a female householder and no spouse or partner present. About 34.2% of all households were made up of individuals and 16.2% had someone living alone who was 65 years of age or older.

There were 1,596 housing units, of which 12.3% were vacant. The homeowner vacancy rate was 3.7% and the rental vacancy rate was 12.7%.

Racial composition as of the 2020 census
Race	Number	Percent
White	3,076	95.2%
Black or African American	20	0.6%
American Indian and Alaska Native	1	0.0%
Asian	19	0.6%
Native Hawaiian and Other Pacific Islander	0	0.0%
Some other race	20	0.6%
Two or more races	95	2.9%
Hispanic or Latino (of any race)	39	1.2%

=== 2000 census ===
As of the census of 2000, there were 3,488 people, 1,455 households, and 934 families residing in the city. The population density was 2,032.6 inhabitants per square mile (784.8/km^{2}). There were 1,609 housing units at an average density of 937.6 per square mile (362.0/km^{2}). The racial makeup of the city was 98.80% White, 0.32% African American, 0.40% Native American, 0.09% Asian, 0.06% from other races, and 0.34% from two or more races. Hispanic or Latino of any race were 0.46% of the population.

There were 1,455 households, out of which 29.8% had children under the age of 18 living with them, 49.8% were married couples living together, 10.6% had a female householder with no husband present, and 35.8% were non-families. 31.0% of all households were made up of individuals, and 14.8% had someone living alone who was 65 years of age or older. The average household size was 2.32 and the average family size was 2.87.

In the city, the population was spread out, with 23.9% under the age of 18, 8.4% from 18 to 24, 26.5% from 25 to 44, 21.3% from 45 to 64, and 19.9% who were 65 years of age or older. The median age was 39 years. For every 100 females, there were 88.2 males. For every 100 females age 18 and over, there were 82.7 males.

The median income for a household in the city was $31,905, and the median income for a family was $41,511. Males had a median income of $30,824 versus $22,121 for females. The per capita income for the city was $16,541. About 7.4% of families and 10.7% of the population were below the poverty line, including 12.0% of those under age 18 and 9.3% of those age 65 or over.

== Notable people ==
- Warren Ambrose, professor of mathematics at the Massachusetts Institute of Technology
- Julian N. Frisbie, decorated brigadier general, USMC, during World War II
- Edward Alsworth Ross, sociologist, eugenicist, and major figure of early criminology
- Henry Calvert Simons, economist at the University of Chicago
- Luella Wilcox St. Clair Moss, suffragist, one of the first female college presidents in the U.S.
- Melvin Vaniman, aviator and photographer who specialized in panoramic images
