= Pitman Township, Montgomery County, Illinois =

Pitman Township
- Township

- Location of Illinois in the United States
- Coordinates: 39°23′N 89°39′W
- Country: United States
- State: Illinois
- County: Montgomery
- Settled: Unknown

Area
  - Total: 36.42 sq mi (94.3 km^{2})
  - Land: 36.41 sq mi (94.3 km^{2})
  - Water: 0.01 sq mi (0.026 km^{2})
- Elevation: 640 ft (200 m)

Population (2010)
  - Estimate (2016): 487
  - Density: 14/sq mi (5.4/km^{2})
- Time zone: UTC-6 (CST)
  - Summer (DST): UTC-5 (CDT)
- FIPS code: 17-135-60183

Pitman Township (T11N R5W) is located in Montgomery County, Illinois, United States. As of the 2010 census, its population was 508 and it contained 227 housing units.

== Geography ==
According to the 2010 census, the township has a total area of 36.42 square miles (94.3 km^{2}), of which 36.41 square miles (94.3 km^{2}) (or 99.97%) is land and 0.01 square miles (0.026 km^{2}) (or 0.03%) is water.

== Demographics ==
Historical population
Census	Pop.	Note	%±
2016 (est.)	487
U.S. Decennial Census

== Adjacent townships ==
- Bois D'Arc Township (north)
- Harvel Township (east)
- Raymond Township (southeast)
- Zanesville Township, Montgomery County (south)
- Nilwood Township, Macoupin County (west)
- Girard Township (northwest)
