= Maxwell Township, Sangamon County, Illinois =

Coordinates: 39°39′12″N 89°54′57″W

Maxwell Township
- Township
- Location in Sangamon County

- Sangamon County's location in Illinois
- Country: United States
- State: Illinois
- County: Sangamon
- Established: Before 1921

Area
  - Total: 20.98 sq mi (54.3 km^{2})
  - Land: 20.98 sq mi (54.3 km^{2})
  - Water: 0 sq mi (0 km^{2}) 0%

Population (2010)
  - Estimate (2016): 191
  - Density: 9.2/sq mi (3.6/km^{2})
- Time zone: UTC-6 (CST)
  - Summer (DST): UTC-5 (CDT)
- FIPS code: 17-167-47618

Maxwell Township is located in Sangamon County, Illinois. As of the 2010 census, its population was 193 and it contained 72 housing units. Maxwell Township was formed from a portion of Loami Township on March 14, 1899, by the Sangamon County Board.

== Geography ==
According to the 2010 census, the township has a total area of 20.98 square miles (54.3 km^{2}), all land.

== Demographics ==
Historical population
Census	Pop.	Note	%±
2016 (est.)	191
U.S. Decennial Census

[[The following section is based on the Census data ACS 2024]]

The town, as of the ACS 2024 census, has 238 people with a population density of 11.3 people per square mile. The median age of the population is 57.4 years with 89% of whom aged 18 to 64 years and the rest split between over 65's having 9% of the share and under 18's having 2% of the share. 63% of the population is female, with the rest 37% being male.

(The following data have a margin of error at least 10 percent of the total value)

=== Ethnicity ===
White - 96%

Two - 4%
