= Harvel, Illinois =

- Village
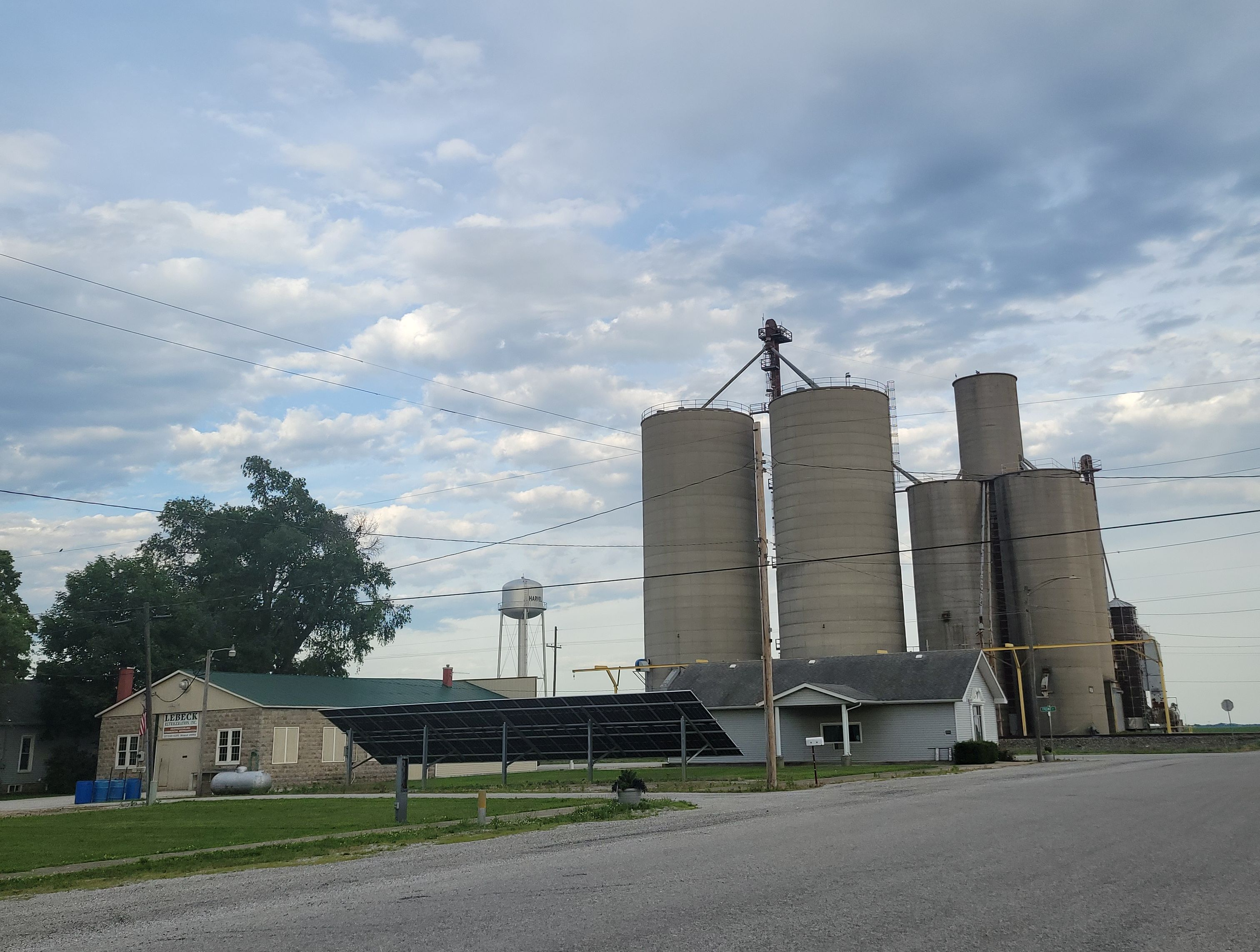
- Harvel skyline with grain elevator and water tower

- Location in Christian and Montgomery counties, Illinois
- Coordinates: 39°21′28″N 89°31′56″W
- Country: United States
- State: Illinois
- Counties: Christian, Montgomery
- Townships: King, Harvel

Government
  - Village president: Cathie Downey

Area
  - Total: 0.72 sq mi (1.86 km^{2})
  - Land: 0.72 sq mi (1.86 km^{2})
  - Water: 0 sq mi (0.00 km^{2})
- Elevation: 637 ft (194 m)

Population (2020)
  - Total: 178
  - Density: 247.3/sq mi (95.47/km^{2})
- Time zone: UTC-6 (CST)
  - Summer (DST): UTC-5 (CDT)
- ZIP code: 62538
- Area code: 217
- FIPS code: 17-33357
- GNIS feature ID: 2398261

Harvel is a village in Christian and Montgomery counties in the U.S. state of Illinois. The population was 178 at the 2020 census, down from 223 in 2010.

== History ==
Harvel was incorporated as a village on January 14, 1873. It was named for John Harvel, a distinguished Civil War veteran who resided in the area. The first settlers of the area were of German, French, and English extraction, and came to Harvel primarily from the eastern region of the United States.

== Geography ==
Harvel is in southwestern Christian County and northern Montgomery County, split approximately evenly between the two. Illinois Route 48 (Front Street) passes through the village, leading southwest 3.5 miles (5.6 km) to Raymond and northeast 19 miles (31 km) to Taylorville, the Christian County seat. Hillsboro, the Montgomery County seat, is 15 miles (24 km) to the south via county roads.

According to the U.S. Census Bureau, Harvel has a total area of 0.72 square miles (1.86 km^{2}), all land.

== Demographics ==
Historical population
Census	Pop.	Note	%±
1890	246		—
1900	357		45.1%
1910	396		10.9%
1920	351		−11.4%
1930	322		−8.3%
1940	319		−0.9%
1950	301		−5.6%
1960	285		−5.3%
1970	275		−3.5%
1980	278		1.1%
1990	213		−23.4%
2000	235		10.3%
2010	223		−5.1%
2020	178		−20.2%
U.S. Decennial Census

As of the 2020 census there were 178 people, 92 households, and 61 families residing in the village. The population density was 247.91 inhabitants per square mile (95.72/km^{2}). There were 100 housing units at an average density of 139.28 per square mile (53.78/km^{2}). The racial makeup of the village was 96.07% White, 0.56% Native American, and 3.37% from two or more races. Hispanic or Latino of any race were 2.25% of the population.

There were 92 households, out of which 38.0% had children under the age of 18 living with them, 54.35% were married couples living together, 6.52% had a female householder with no husband present, and 33.70% were non-families. 27.17% of all households were made up of individuals, and 8.70% had someone living alone who was 65 years of age or older. The average household size was 3.21 and the average family size was 2.67.

The village's age distribution consisted of 28.0% under the age of 18, 7.3% from 18 to 24, 29.7% from 25 to 44, 21.6% from 45 to 64, and 13.4% who were 65 years of age or older. The median age was 36.0 years. For every 100 females, there were 83.6 males. For every 100 females age 18 and over, there were 88.3 males.

The median income for a household in the village was $37,500, and the median income for a family was $56,875. Males had a median income of $48,125 versus $19,750 for females. The per capita income for the village was $18,360. About 8.2% of families and 14.8% of the population were below the poverty line, including 5.0% of those under age 18 and 3.0% of those age 65 or over.

== Notable people ==
- Mortimer A. Cullen (1891 – 1954), New York state politician
- Ray Schalk (1892 – 1970), catcher for the Chicago White Sox, inducted into the Baseball Hall of Fame (1955)
