= Sangamon County, Illinois =

County in Illinois, United States

- County
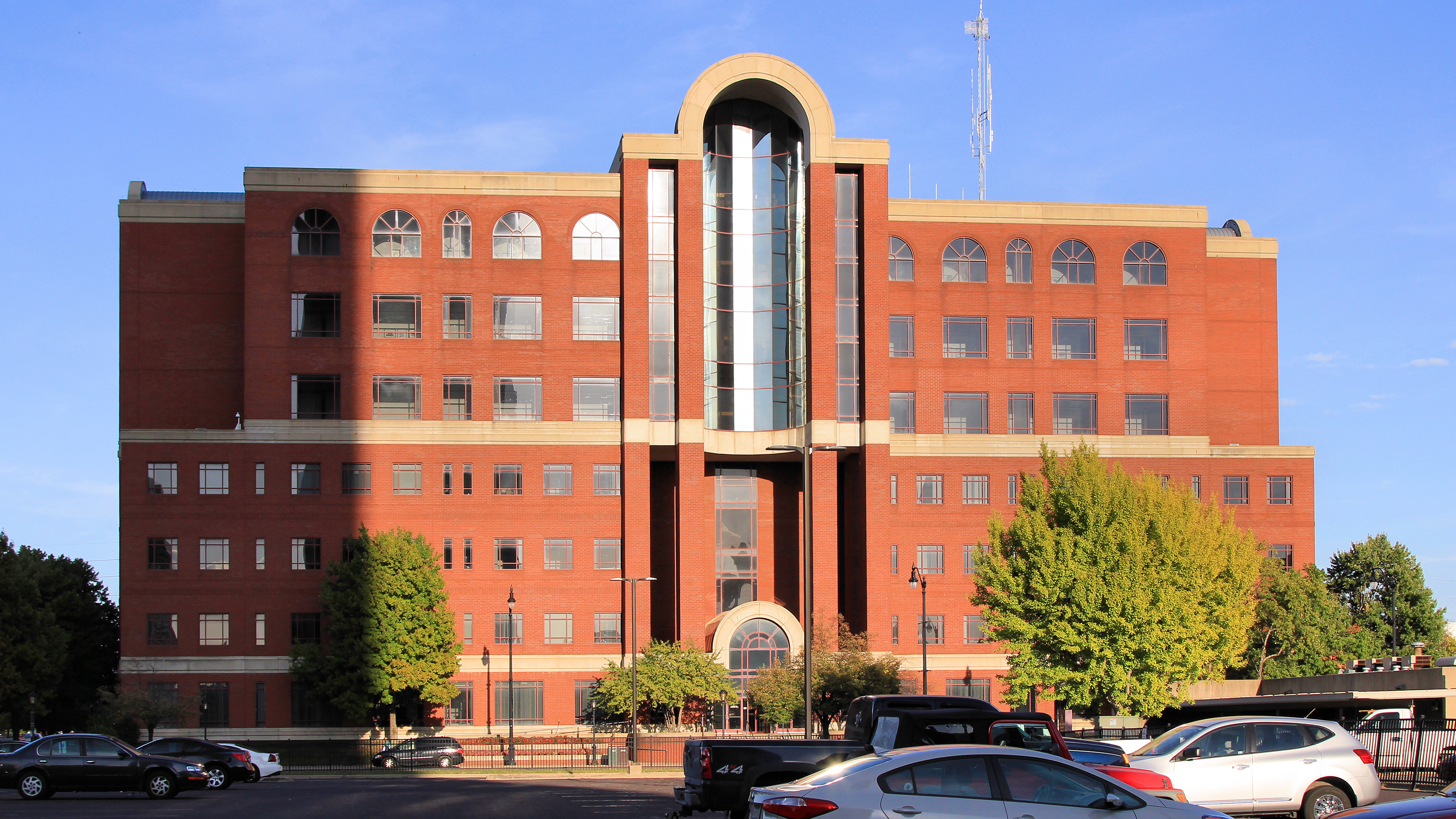
- Sangamon County Courthouse in 2017

- Flag Seal

- Location within the U.S. state of Illinois
- Coordinates: 39°46′N 89°40′W
- Country: United States
- State: Illinois
- Founded: 1821
- Named for: Sangamon River
- Seat: Springfield
- Largest city: Springfield

Area
  - Total: 877 sq mi (2,270 km^{2})
  - Land: 868 sq mi (2,250 km^{2})
  - Water: 8.7 sq mi (23 km^{2}) 1.0%

Population (2020)
  - Total: 196,343
  - Estimate (2025): 194,170 ▼
  - Density: 226/sq mi (87.3/km^{2})
- Congressional districts: 13th, 15th
- Website: sangamonil.gov

Sangamon County (Note: /ˈsæŋəmən/ SANG-ə-mən) is a central county in the U.S. state of Illinois. According to the 2020 census, it had a population of 196,343. The county seat and the largest city in the county is Springfield, the state capital.

Sangamon County is included in the Springfield, IL Metropolitan Statistical Area. The county is named for the Sangamon River.

== History ==
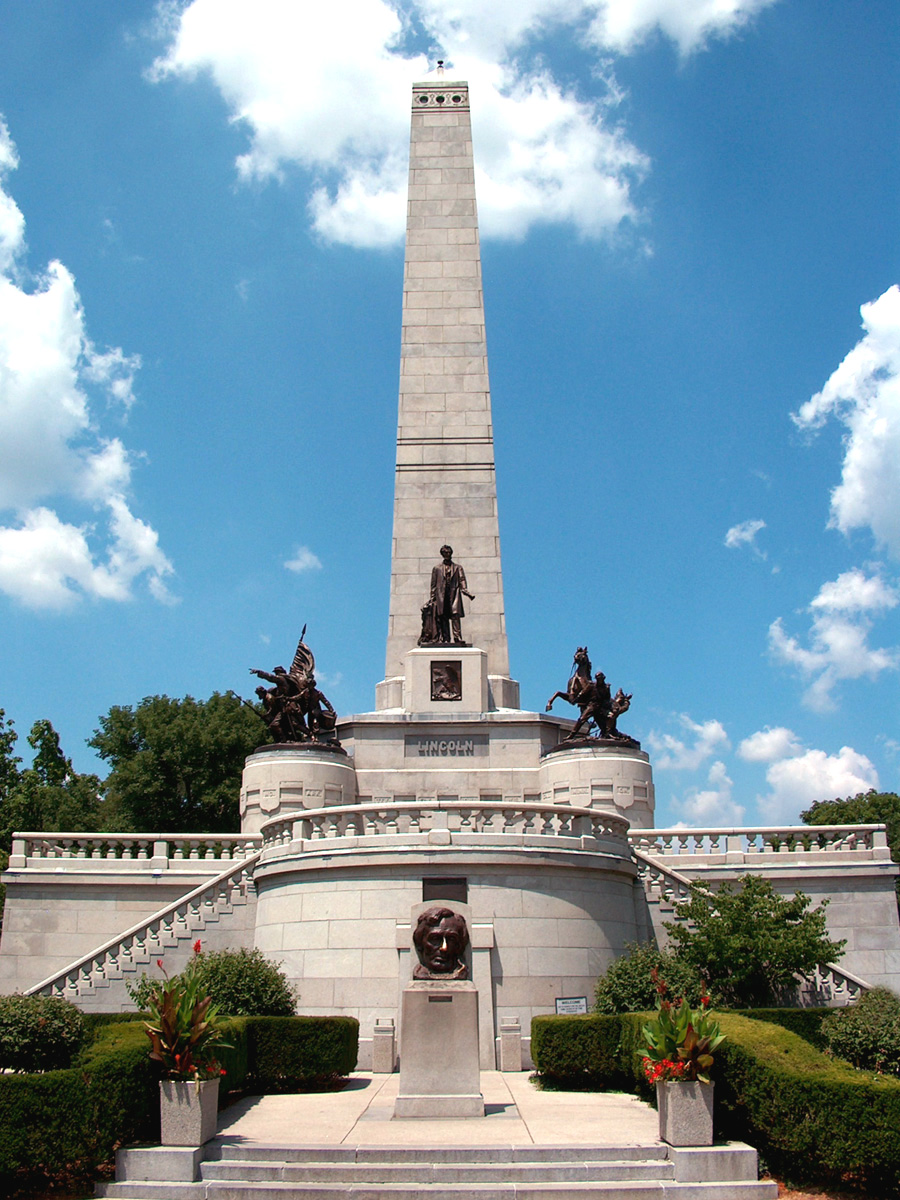
Lincoln Tomb

Sangamon County was formed in 1821 out of Madison and Bond counties. The county was named for the Sangamon River, which runs through it. The origin of the name of the river is unknown; among several explanations is the theory that it comes from the Potawatomi word Sain-guee-mon (pronounced "sang gä mun"), meaning "where there is plenty to eat." Published histories of neighboring Menard County (formed from Sangamon County) suggest that the name was first given to the river by the French explorers of the late 17th century as they passed through the region. The river was named to honor "St. Gamo", or Saint Gamo, an 8th-century French Benedictine monk. The French pronunciation "San-Gamo" is the legacy.

Prior to being elected President of the United States, Abraham Lincoln represented Sangamon County in the Illinois Legislature. Lincoln, along with several other legislators, was instrumental in securing Springfield, the Sangamon County seat, as the state's capital. Sangamon County was also within the congressional district represented by Lincoln when he served in the US House of Representatives. Another legislator who represented Sangamon County was Colonel Edmund Dick Taylor, also known as "Father of the Greenback". The prominent financiers and industrialists Jacob Bunn and John Whitfield Bunn were based in Springfield, Sangamon County, Illinois, as well as in Chicago, during the nineteenth century and the early twentieth century. The careers of these men and the people with whom they collaborated helped to shape much of the history and development of Sangamon County, Illinois.

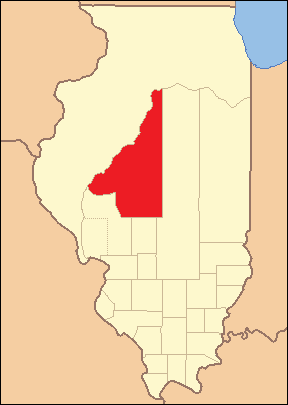
Sangamon County from the time of its creation to 1823

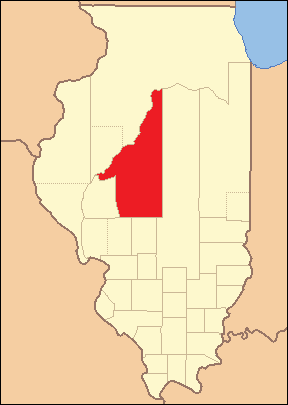
Sangamon County between 1823 and 1825

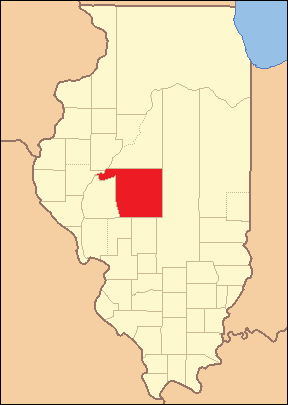
Sangamon County between 1825 and 1839

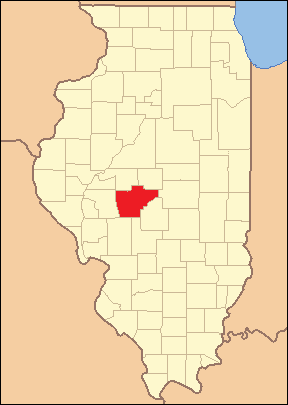
Sangamon in 1839, when the creation of Logan and Menard Counties reduced it to its present borders

== Geography ==
According to the U.S. Census Bureau, the county has a total area of 877 square miles (2,270 km^{2}), of which 868 square miles (2,250 km^{2}) is land and 8.7 square miles (23 km^{2}) (1.0%) is water.

=== Climate and weather ===
Springfield, Illinois

Climate chart (precipitation, max. and min. temperature)
J	F	M	A	M	J	J	A	S	O	N	D
1.6 33 17	1.8 39 22	3.2 51 32	3.4 63 42	4.1 74 53	3.8 83 62	3.5 87 66	3.4 85 64	2.8 79 55	2.6 67 44	2.9 51 34	2.5 38 23
- █ Average max. and min. temperatures in °F
- █ Precipitation totals in inches
- Source: The Weather Channel
Metric conversion
J	F	M	A	M	J	J	A	S	O	N	D
41 1 −8	46 4 −6	80 11 0	85 17 6	103 23 12	96 28 17	90 31 19	87 29 18	72 26 13	67 19 7	73 11 1	65 3 −5
- █ Average max. and min. temperatures in °C
- █ Precipitation totals in mm

In recent years, average temperatures in the county seat of Springfield have ranged from a low of 17 °F (−8 °C) in January to a high of 87 °F (31 °C) in July, although a record low of −24 °F (−31 °C) was recorded in February 1905 and a record high of 112 °F (44 °C) was recorded in July 1954. Average monthly precipitation ranged from 1.62 inches (41 mm) in January to 4.06 inches (103 mm) in May.

=== Major highways ===
- I-55
  - I-55 BL (Springfield)
- I-72
- US 36
- IL 4
- IL 29
- IL 54
- IL 97
- IL 104
- IL 123
- IL 124
- IL 125

=== Transit ===
- Sangamon Mass Transit District
- Springfield station
- List of intercity bus stops in Illinois

=== Adjacent counties ===
- Menard County – north
- Logan County – northeast
- Macon County – east
- Christian County – southeast
- Montgomery County – south
- Macoupin County – south
- Morgan County – west
- Cass County – northwest

=== National protected areas ===
- Lincoln Home National Historic Site
- Springfield 1908 Race Riot National Monument

=== State protected areas ===
- Sangchris Lake State Recreation Area

== Demographics ==
Historical population
Census	Pop.	Note	%±
1830	12,960		—
1840	14,716		13.5%
1850	19,228		30.7%
1860	32,274		67.8%
1870	46,352		43.6%
1880	52,894		14.1%
1890	61,195		15.7%
1900	71,593		17.0%
1910	91,024		27.1%
1920	100,262		10.1%
1930	111,733		11.4%
1940	117,912		5.5%
1950	131,484		11.5%
1960	146,539		11.5%
1970	161,335		10.1%
1980	176,089		9.1%
1990	178,386		1.3%
2000	188,951		5.9%
2010	197,465		4.5%
2020	196,343		−0.6%
2025 (est.)	194,170	▼	−1.1%
U.S. Decennial Census; 1790–1960 1900–1990; 1990–2000 2010

=== 2020 census ===
As of the 2020 census, the county had a population of 196,343. The median age was 41.1 years. 22.0% of residents were under the age of 18 and 18.7% of residents were 65 years of age or older. For every 100 females there were 92.6 males, and for every 100 females age 18 and over there were 89.3 males age 18 and over.

The racial makeup of the county was 77.4% White, 13.2% Black or African American, 0.3% American Indian and Alaska Native, 2.2% Asian, <0.1% Native Hawaiian and Pacific Islander, 1.0% from some other race, and 5.9% from two or more races. Hispanic or Latino residents of any race comprised 2.7% of the population.

81.1% of residents lived in urban areas, while 18.9% lived in rural areas.

There were 84,403 households in the county, of which 27.3% had children under the age of 18 living in them. Of all households, 42.1% were married-couple households, 19.3% were households with a male householder and no spouse or partner present, and 31.3% were households with a female householder and no spouse or partner present. About 33.7% of all households were made up of individuals and 13.7% had someone living alone who was 65 years of age or older.

There were 92,982 housing units, of which 9.2% were vacant. Among occupied housing units, 68.0% were owner-occupied and 32.0% were renter-occupied. The homeowner vacancy rate was 2.0% and the rental vacancy rate was 11.6%.

=== Racial and ethnic composition ===
Sangamon County, Illinois – Racial and ethnic composition Note: the US Census treats Hispanic/Latino as an ethnic category. This table excludes Latinos from the racial categories and assigns them to a separate category. Hispanics/Latinos may be of any race.
Race / Ethnicity (NH = Non-Hispanic)	Pop 1980	Pop 1990	Pop 2000	Pop 2010	Pop 2020	% 1980	% 1990	% 2000	% 2010	% 2020
White alone (NH)	162,262	161,060	163,967	162,987	150,467	92.15%	90.29%	86.78%	82.54%	76.63%
Black or African American alone (NH)	11,321	14,297	18,134	23,146	25,686	6.43%	8.01%	9.60%	11.72%	13.08%
Native American or Alaska Native alone (NH)	213	281	353	343	349	0.12%	0.16%	0.19%	0.17%	0.18%
Asian alone (NH)	972	1,356	2,067	3,198	4,300	0.55%	0.76%	1.09%	1.62%	2.19%
Native Hawaiian or Pacific Islander alone (NH)	x	x	41	44	55	x	x	0.02%	0.02%	0.03%
Other race alone (NH)	313	118	258	308	727	0.18%	0.07%	0.14%	0.16%	0.37%
Mixed race or Multiracial (NH)	x	x	2,131	3,959	9,450	x	x	1.13%	2.00%	4.81%
Hispanic or Latino (any race)	1,008	1,274	2,000	3,480	5,309	0.57%	0.71%	1.06%	1.76%	2.70%
Total	176,089	178,386	188,951	197,465	196,343	100.00%	100.00%	100.00%	100.00%	100.00%

=== 2010 census ===
As of the 2010 census, there were 197,465 people, 82,986 households, and 51,376 families residing in the county. The population density was 227.4 inhabitants per square mile (87.8/km^{2}). There were 89,901 housing units at an average density of 103.5 per square mile (40.0/km^{2}). The racial makeup of the county was 83.6% white, 11.8% black or African American, 1.6% Asian, 0.2% American Indian, 0.5% from other races, and 2.2% from two or more races. Those of Hispanic or Latino origin made up 1.8% of the population. In terms of ancestry, 29.4% were German, 14.8% were Irish, 12.1% were English, 9.5% were American, and 6.3% were Italian.

Of the 82,986 households, 30.4% had children under the age of 18 living with them, 44.4% were married couples living together, 13.2% had a female householder with no husband present, 38.1% were non-families, and 31.8% of all households were made up of individuals. The average household size was 2.33 and the average family size was 2.94. The median age was 39.2 years.

The median income for a household in the county was $52,232 and the median income for a family was $66,917. Males had a median income of $48,324 versus $36,691 for females. The per capita income for the county was $28,394. About 9.9% of families and 13.4% of the population were below the poverty line, including 19.7% of those under age 18 and 7.3% of those age 65 or over.

== Government ==
Sangamon County is governed by a 29-member board. Each member of the board is elected from a separate district.

Other elected officials include:

Office	Representative	Party	Residence	Took office
Auditor	Andy Goleman	Republican	Divernon	2015 (appointed)
Clerk of the Circuit Court	Paul Palazzolo	Republican	Springfield	2015 (appointed)
Coroner	James Allmon	Republican	Springfield	2020 (appointed)
County Clerk	Don Gray	Republican	Springfield	2015 (appointed)
Recorder	Josh Langfelder	Democratic	Springfield	2008 (elected)
Regional Superintendent of Schools	Shannon Fehrholz	Republican	Springfield	2010 (appointed)
Sheriff	Paula Crouch	Republican	Illiopolis	2024 (appointed)
State's Attorney	John Milhiser	Republican	Springfield	2023 (appointed)
Treasurer	Joe Aiello	Republican	Springfield	2018 (elected)

=== Politics ===
Sangamon County has been a Republican stronghold for decades, consistently supporting GOP candidates in local, state, and national elections. Despite its relatively large population and the presence of Springfield, the state's capital and a significant urban center, the county has remained reliably conservative. In recent years, however, the county has shown signs of shifting toward the Democratic Party, reflecting changing demographics and political attitudes, although Democrats have remained unable to carry the county in most races.

In the 2026 Illinois gubernatorial election, Sangamon County voted for Democratic incumbent JB Pritzker. The election marked the first time the county had voted for a Democratic governor since 1964. In the 2026 U.S. Senate election in Illinois, Democratic progressive candidate Juliana Stratton narrowly defeated Republican Don Tracy in Sangamon County.

=== Sheriff department ===
In 2024, sheriff deputy Sean Grayson was fired after murdering Sonya Massey, an unarmed woman, within her home located in Woodside Township near Springfield, Illinois following her call for assistance. Massey's father, community members, and elected officials raised strong concerns about the department after it was revealed prior to Grayson's hiring in 2023 that he had been kicked out of the U.S. Army in 2016 after being convicted of 2 DUI's, and worked at 5 different Illinois police departments between 2020 and 2023. Sheriff Jack Campbell, who hired Grayson, announced he would step down effective August 31, 2024 after receiving calls to resign, including from Governor J.B Pritzker

United States presidential election results for Sangamon County, Illinois
Year	Republican		Democratic		Third party(ies)	
Year	No.	%	No.	%	No.	%
1892	6,009	41.06%	7,665	52.38%	960	6.56%
1896	8,998	50.17%	8,582	47.85%	354	1.97%
1900	9,769	49.61%	9,499	48.24%	422	2.14%
1904	10,638	53.44%	7,571	38.03%	1,697	8.53%
1908	10,422	49.79%	9,351	44.67%	1,161	5.55%
1912	6,196	31.14%	8,406	42.25%	5,295	26.61%
1916	20,900	51.65%	17,958	44.38%	1,606	3.97%
1920	21,820	59.42%	11,000	29.95%	3,903	10.63%
1924	23,443	51.58%	12,640	27.81%	9,363	20.60%
1928	31,957	59.99%	21,026	39.47%	288	0.54%
1932	26,856	44.29%	32,745	54.00%	1,042	1.72%
1936	29,562	46.43%	32,281	50.70%	1,827	2.87%
1940	35,464	52.44%	31,943	47.23%	221	0.33%
1944	32,871	53.24%	28,713	46.50%	161	0.26%
1948	33,714	53.28%	29,196	46.14%	363	0.57%
1952	39,392	53.99%	33,526	45.95%	50	0.07%
1956	42,951	59.71%	28,949	40.24%	35	0.05%
1960	41,483	53.64%	35,793	46.28%	59	0.08%
1964	33,077	43.43%	43,073	56.55%	16	0.02%
1968	36,510	50.02%	29,542	40.47%	6,944	9.51%
1972	50,458	65.47%	25,720	33.37%	897	1.16%
1976	43,309	52.24%	38,017	45.85%	1,584	1.91%
1980	49,372	57.95%	29,354	34.45%	6,474	7.60%
1984	54,086	61.10%	34,059	38.47%	378	0.43%
1988	50,175	56.76%	37,729	42.68%	499	0.56%
1992	39,641	40.93%	40,052	41.35%	17,167	17.72%
1996	42,174	47.87%	38,902	44.15%	7,029	7.98%
2000	50,374	55.06%	38,414	41.99%	2,697	2.95%
2004	55,904	58.61%	38,630	40.50%	841	0.88%
2008	46,945	46.90%	51,300	51.25%	1,861	1.86%
2012	50,225	53.26%	42,107	44.65%	1,965	2.08%
2016	49,944	50.77%	40,907	41.58%	7,522	7.65%
2020	53,485	50.87%	48,917	46.52%	2,740	2.61%
2024	50,979	51.09%	46,074	46.18%	2,720	2.73%

== Communities ==
=== Cities ===
- Auburn
- Leland Grove
- Springfield (county seat and largest municipality)
- Virden

=== Villages ===
- Berlin
- Buffalo
- Cantrall
- Chatham
- Clear Lake
- Curran
- Dawson
- Divernon
- Grandview
- Illiopolis
- Jerome
- Loami
- Mechanicsburg
- New Berlin
- Pawnee
- Pleasant Plains
- Riverton
- Rochester
- Sherman
- Southern View
- Spaulding
- Thayer
- Williamsville

=== Unincorporated communities ===
- Andrew
- Archer
- Barclay
- Barr
- Bates
- Berry
- Bissell
- Bradfordton
- Breckenridge
- Buckhart
- Buffalo Hart
- Clayville
- Farmingdale
- Glenarm
- Island Grove
- Lowder
- New City
- Riddle Hill
- Salisbury
- Toronto
- Zenobia

=== Townships ===
Sangamon County is divided into these townships:

- Auburn
- Ball
- Buffalo Hart
- Capital (Coterminous with Springfield)
- Cartwright
- Chatham
- Clear Lake
- Cooper
- Cotton Hill
- Curran
- Divernon
- Fancy Creek
- Gardner
- Illiopolis
- Island Grove
- Lanesville
- Loami
- Maxwell
- Mechanicsburg
- New Berlin
- Pawnee
- Rochester
- Salisbury (former, now defunct)
- Springfield
- Talkington
- Williams
- Woodside

== Education ==
Here is a listing of school districts (all are full K–12) with any territory in this county, no matter how small, even if the administrative headquarters and/or schools are in other counties:

- A-C Central Community Unit School District 262
- Athens Community Unit School District 213
- Auburn Community Unit School District 10
- Ball-Chatham Community Unit School District 5
- Edinburg Community Unit School District 4
- Mount Pulaski Community Unit District 23
- New Berlin Community Unit School District 16
- North Mac Community Unit School District 34
- Pawnee Community Unit School District 11
- Porta Community Unit School District 202
- Pleasant Plains Community Unit School District 8
- Riverton Community Unit School District 14
- Rochester Community Unit School District 3A
- Sangamon Valley Community Unit School District 9
- Springfield School District 186
- Tri-City Community Unit School District 1
- Waverly Community Unit School District 6
- Williamsville Community Unit School District 15

=== Forts ===
- Camp Butler

== See also ==
- National Register of Historic Places listings in Sangamon County, Illinois
