= Springfield Township, Sangamon County, Illinois =

Coordinates: 39°50′35″N 89°39′40″W

Springfield Township
- Township
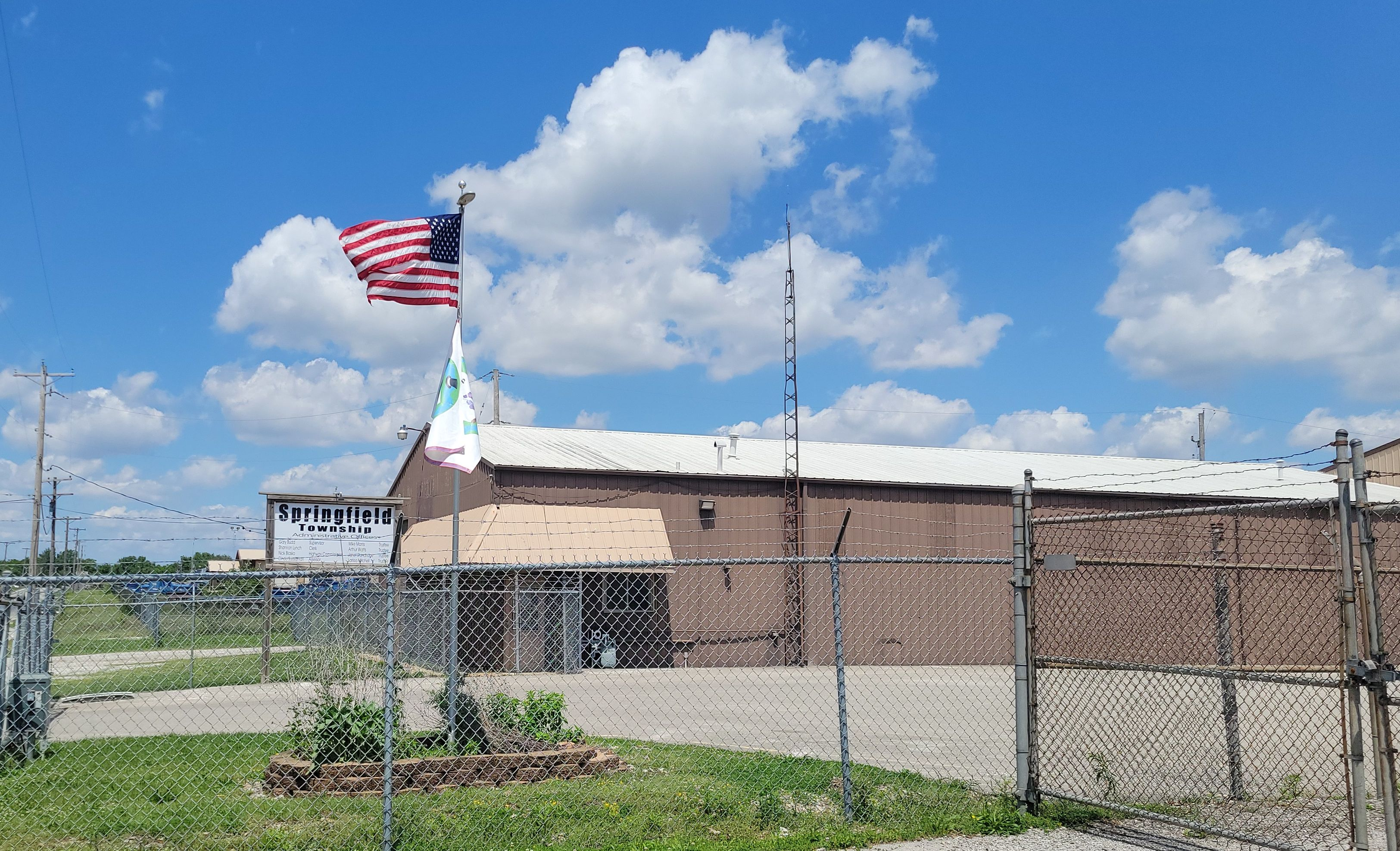
- Springfield Township government building

- Flag

- Location in Sangamon County

- Sangamon County's location in Illinois
- Country: United States
- State: Illinois
- County: Sangamon
- Established: November 6, 1860

Area
  - Total: 14.33 sq mi (37.1 km^{2})
  - Land: 14.06 sq mi (36.4 km^{2})
  - Water: 0.27 sq mi (0.70 km^{2}) 1.88%

Population (2010)
  - Estimate (2016): 5,703
  - Density: 444.1/sq mi (171.5/km^{2})
- Time zone: UTC-6 (CST)
  - Summer (DST): UTC-5 (CDT)
- FIPS code: 17-167-72013

Springfield Township is located in Sangamon County, Illinois. It is made up of unincorporated areas bordering on the city of Springfield, which should not be confused with the township. As of the 2010 census, its population was 6,245 and it contained 3,099 housing units.

== History ==
The township was created in 1861, at which time it included the city of Springfield. The township's original boundaries corresponded to the survey township 16 North, Range 5 West. The creation of Capital Township as a coterminous township with the city in 1878 caused Springfield Township's area to shrink as the city grew. However, a small part of Springfield Township has been annexed into the city without being removed from the township. As of the 2010 census, 481 people lived in this area where Springfield Township and the city overlap. A 2023 advisory referendum on merging this portion of Springfield Township into Capital Township was rejected by township residents.

== Geography ==
According to the 2010 census, the township has a total area of 14.33 square miles (37.1 km^{2}), of which 14.06 square miles (36.4 km^{2}) (or 98.12%) is land and 0.27 square miles (0.70 km^{2}) (or 1.88%) is water.

=== Cities, Towns, Villages ===
- Grandview
- Sherman (small portion)
- Springfield (small portions)

== Demographics ==
Historical population
Census	Pop.	Note	%±
2016 (est.)	5,703
U.S. Decennial Census

As of the 2020 census, there was a population of 5,813, 2,686 households, and 3,191 housing units in the township. Median Household Income was $39,507 with an employment rate of 50.7%.
