= Nilwood Township, Macoupin County, Illinois =

Nilwood Township
- Township

- Location of Illinois in the United States
- Coordinates: 39°24′N 89°45′W
- Country: United States
- State: Illinois
- County: Macoupin
- Settled: November 1, 1870

Area
  - Total: 36.46 sq mi (94.4 km^{2})
  - Land: 36.46 sq mi (94.4 km^{2})
  - Water: 0 sq mi (0 km^{2}) 0%
- Elevation: 640 ft (200 m)

Population (2020)
  - Total: 620
  - Density: 17/sq mi (6.6/km^{2})
- Time zone: UTC-6 (CST)
  - Summer (DST): UTC-5 (CDT)
- FIPS code: 17-117-53052

Nilwood Township (T11N R6W) is a township located in Macoupin County, Illinois, United States. Its township hall is located at McVey. In addition to McVey, its boundaries incorporate the towns of Nilwood and Standard City. As of the 2020 census, its population was 620 and it contained 255 housing units.

== Geography ==
According to the 2021 census gazetteer files, Nilwood Township has a total area of 36.46 square miles (94.43 km^{2}), all land.

== Notable people ==
James Bullough Lansing, founder of audio companies Altec Lansing and JBL, is from Nilwood Township.

== Demographics ==
As of the 2020 census there were 620 people, 204 households, and 154 families residing in the township. The population density was 17.00 inhabitants per square mile (6.56/km^{2}). There were 255 housing units at an average density of 6.99 per square mile (2.70/km^{2}). The racial makeup of the township was 95.81% White, 0.16% African American, 0.32% Native American, 0.32% Asian, 0.00% Pacific Islander, 0.16% from other races, and 3.23% from two or more races. Hispanic or Latino of any race were 0.16% of the population.

There were 204 households, out of which 26.50% had children under the age of 18 living with them, 67.16% were married couples living together, 3.92% had a female householder with no spouse present, and 24.51% were non-families. 17.60% of all households were made up of individuals, and 15.20% had someone living alone who was 65 years of age or older. The average household size was 2.68 and the average family size was 3.11.

According to the 2020 American Community Survey, township's age distribution consisted of 17.8% under the age of 18, 8.6% from 18 to 24, 16.8% from 25 to 44, 33.8% from 45 to 64, and 22.9% who were 65 years of age or older. The median age was 51.1 years. For every 100 females, there were 105.3 males. For every 100 females age 18 and over, there were 103.3 males.

The median income for a household in the township was $70,313, and the median income for a family was $72,500. Males had a median income of $44,464 versus $31,417 for females. The per capita income for the township was $26,687. About 1.9% of families and 5.1% of the population were below the poverty line, including 2.1% of those under age 18 and 4.0% of those age 65 or over.

Historical population
Census	Pop.	Note	%±
2000	699		—
2010	637		−8.9%
2020	620		−2.7%
U.S. Decennial Census

== Adjacent townships ==
- Girard Township (north)
- Bois D'Arc Township, Montgomery County (northeast)
- Pitman Township, Montgomery County (east)
- Zanesville Township, Montgomery County (southeast)
- Shaws Point Township (south)
- Carlinville Township (southwest)
- South Otter Township (west)
- North Otter Township (northwest)
