= Harvel Township, Montgomery County, Illinois =

Harvel Township
- Township

- Location of Illinois in the United States
- Coordinates: 39°24′N 89°34′W
- Country: United States
- State: Illinois
- County: Montgomery
- Settled: November 5, 1872

Area
  - Total: 18.02 sq mi (46.7 km^{2})
  - Land: 18.02 sq mi (46.7 km^{2})
  - Water: 0 sq mi (0 km^{2})
- Elevation: 650 ft (200 m)

Population (2010)
  - Estimate (2016): 233
  - Density: 13.5/sq mi (5.2/km^{2})
- Time zone: UTC-6 (CST)
  - Summer (DST): UTC-5 (CDT)
- FIPS code: 17-135-33370

Harvel Township (T11N W½R4) is located in Montgomery County, Illinois, United States. As of the 2010 census, its population was 243 and it contained 124 housing units.

== Geography ==
According to the 2010 census, the township has a total area of 18.02 square miles (46.7 km^{2}), all land.

== Demographics ==
Historical population
Census	Pop.	Note	%±
2016 (est.)	233
U.S. Decennial Census

== Adjacent townships ==
- Bois D'Arc Township (northwest & north)
- King Township, Christian County (northeast & east)
- Raymond Township (southeast & south)
- Zanesville Township, Montgomery County (southwest)
- Pitman Township (west)
