= Rochester Township, Sangamon County, Illinois =

Coordinates: 39°44′46″N 89°31′59″W

Rochester Township
- Township
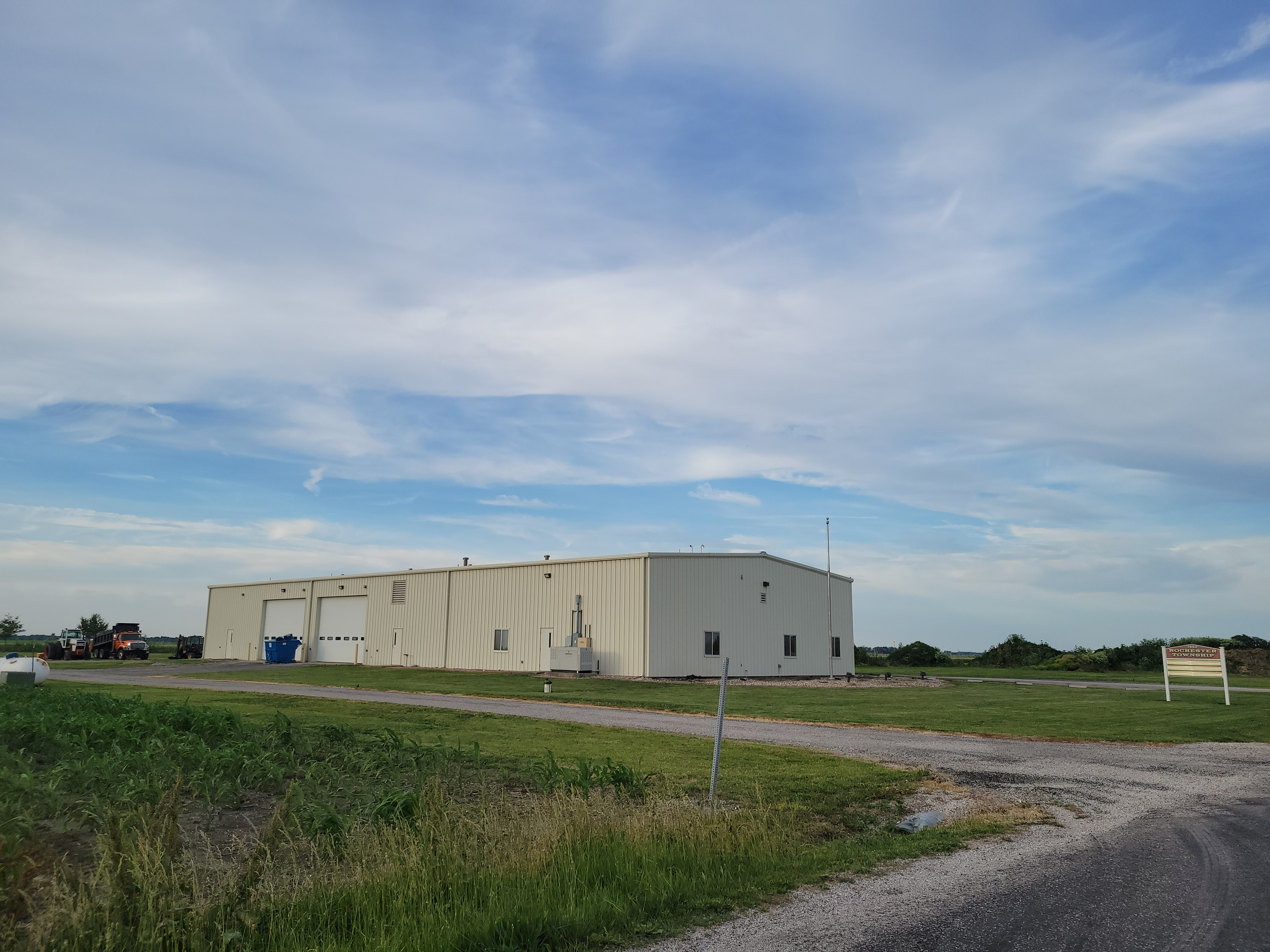
- Rochester Township government building

- Location in Sangamon County

- Sangamon County's location in Illinois
- Country: United States
- State: Illinois
- County: Sangamon
- Established: November 6, 1860

Area
  - Total: 33.63 sq mi (87.1 km^{2})
  - Land: 33.42 sq mi (86.6 km^{2})
  - Water: 0.22 sq mi (0.57 km^{2}) 0.65%

Population (2010)
  - Estimate (2016): 5,411
  - Density: 160.4/sq mi (61.9/km^{2})
- Time zone: UTC-6 (CST)
  - Summer (DST): UTC-5 (CDT)
- FIPS code: 17-167-64772

Rochester Township is located in Sangamon County, Illinois. As of the 2010 census, its population was 5,361 and it contained 2,081 housing units.

== Geography ==
According to the 2010 census, the township has a total area of 33.63 square miles (87.1 km^{2}), of which 33.42 square miles (86.6 km^{2}) (or 99.38%) is land and 0.22 square miles (0.57 km^{2}) (or 0.65%) is water.

== Demographics ==
Historical population
| Census | Pop. | Note | %± |
|---|---|---|---|
| 2016 (est.) | 5,411 |
U.S. Decennial Census
