= Jerome, Illinois =

- Village
- Village of Jerome
- Location of Jerome in Sangamon County, Illinois.
- Coordinates: 39°46′04″N 89°40′42″W
- Country: United States
- State: Illinois
- County: Sangamon

Area
  - Total: 0.46 sq mi (1.20 km^{2})
  - Land: 0.46 sq mi (1.20 km^{2})
  - Water: 0 sq mi (0.00 km^{2})
- Elevation: 604 ft (184 m)

Population (2020)
  - Total: 1,692
  - Density: 3,661.8/sq mi (1,413.81/km^{2})
- Time zone: UTC-6 (CST)
  - Summer (DST): UTC-5 (CDT)
- ZIP code: 62704
- Area code: 217
- FIPS code: 17-38375
- GNIS feature ID: 2398298
- Website: www.villageofjerome.com

Jerome is a village in Sangamon County, Illinois, United States. As of the 2020 census, Jerome had a population of 1,692. It is part of the Springfield, Illinois Metropolitan Statistical Area.

== Geography ==
According to the 2010 census, Jerome has a total area of 0.45 square miles (1.17 km^{2}), all land.

== Demographics ==
Historical population
| Census | Pop. | Note | %± |
|---|---|---|---|
| 1940 | 424 | | — |
| 1950 | 689 | | 62.5% |
| 1960 | 1,666 | | 141.8% |
| 1970 | 1,673 | | 0.4% |
| 1980 | 1,374 | | −17.9% |
| 1990 | 1,206 | | −12.2% |
| 2000 | 1,414 | | 17.2% |
| 2010 | 1,656 | | 17.1% |
| 2020 | 1,692 | | 2.2% |
U.S. Decennial Census

=== 2020 census ===
As of the 2020 census, Jerome had a population of 1,692. The median age was 41.2 years. 17.1% of residents were under the age of 18 and 20.4% of residents were 65 years of age or older. For every 100 females there were 93.2 males, and for every 100 females age 18 and over there were 85.0 males age 18 and over.

100.0% of residents lived in urban areas, while 0.0% lived in rural areas.

There were 846 households in Jerome, of which 23.8% had children under the age of 18 living in them. Of all households, 33.7% were married-couple households, 20.9% were households with a male householder and no spouse or partner present, and 36.9% were households with a female householder and no spouse or partner present. About 40.3% of all households were made up of individuals and 18.7% had someone living alone who was 65 years of age or older.

There were 899 housing units, of which 5.9% were vacant. The homeowner vacancy rate was 1.4% and the rental vacancy rate was 6.8%.

Racial composition as of the 2020 census
| Race | Number | Percent |
|---|---|---|
| White | 1,376 | 81.3% |
| Black or African American | 140 | 8.3% |
| American Indian and Alaska Native | 5 | 0.3% |
| Asian | 41 | 2.4% |
| Native Hawaiian and Other Pacific Islander | 0 | 0.0% |
| Some other race | 22 | 1.3% |
| Two or more races | 108 | 6.4% |
| Hispanic or Latino (of any race) | 59 | 3.5% |

=== 2000 census ===
As of the census of 2000, there were 1,414 people, 708 households, and 393 families residing in the village. The population density was 3,806.8 inhabitants per square mile (1,469.8/km^{2}). There were 727 housing units at an average density of 1,957.2 per square mile (755.7/km^{2}). The racial makeup of the village was 94.13% White, 1.70% African American, 0.35% Native American, 1.98% Asian, 0.07% Pacific Islander, 0.35% from other races, and 1.41% from two or more races. Hispanic or Latino of any race were 1.70% of the population.

There were 708 households, out of which 20.8% had children under the age of 18 living with them, 43.4% were married couples living together, 9.5% had a female householder with no husband present, and 44.4% were non-families. 39.1% of all households were made up of individuals, and 15.5% had someone living alone who was 65 years of age or older. The average household size was 2.00 and the average family size was 2.64.

In the village, the population was spread out, with 18.0% under the age of 18, 4.6% from 18 to 24, 28.0% from 25 to 44, 24.3% from 45 to 64, and 25.2% who were 65 years of age or older. The median age was 44 years. For every 100 females, there were 88.0 males. For every 100 females age 18 and over, there were 78.7 males.

The median income for a household in the village was $41,974, and the median income for a family was $48,362. Males had a median income of $31,400 versus $30,508 for females. The per capita income for the village was $23,350. About 1.5% of families and 3.5% of the population were below the poverty line, including 4.1% of those under age 18 and 1.7% of those age 65 or over.

== Transportation ==
The Sangamon Mass Transit District provides bus service on Routes 8, 13, 15, 16 and 903 connecting Jerome to downtown Springfield and other destinations.
