= Barr, Sangamon County, Illinois =

Barr, Illinois
- Unincorporated community
- Location within Illinois Location within the United States
- Coordinates: 39°57′43″N 89°41′49″W
- Country: United States
- State: Illinois
- County: Sangamon
- Elevation: 614 ft (187 m)
- Time zone: UTC-6 (Central (CST))
  - Summer (DST): UTC-5 (CDT)
- Area code: 217
- GNIS feature ID: 422437

Barr is an unincorporated community in Sangamon County, Illinois, United States. Barr is located along Illinois Route 29 and Illinois Route 123, 1.5 miles (2.4 km) east of Athens.
