= Mechanicsburg, Illinois =

Mechanicsburg
- Village
- Location of Mechanicsburg in Sangamon County, Illinois.
- Coordinates: 39°47′50″N 89°24′47″W
- Country: United States
- State: Illinois
- County: Sangamon

Area
  - Total: 1.05 sq mi (2.72 km^{2})
  - Land: 1.03 sq mi (2.68 km^{2})
  - Water: 0.015 sq mi (0.04 km^{2})
- Elevation: 591 ft (180 m)

Population (2020)
  - Total: 662
  - Density: 639.1/sq mi (246.75/km^{2})
- Time zone: UTC-6 (CST)
  - Summer (DST): UTC-5 (CDT)
- ZIP code: 62545
- Area code: 217
- FIPS code: 17-48021
- GNIS feature ID: 2399302
- Website: sites.google.com/view/mechanicsburgil

Mechanicsburg is a village in Sangamon County, Illinois, United States. As of the 2020 census, Mechanicsburg had a population of 662. It is part of the Springfield, Illinois Metropolitan Statistical Area.

== Geography ==
According to the 2010 census, Mechanicsburg has a total area of 1.07 square miles (2.77 km^{2}), all land.

== Demographics ==
Historical population
Census	Pop.	Note	%±
1850	201		—
1870	366		—
1880	396		8.2%
1890	426		7.6%
1900	476		11.7%
1910	417		−12.4%
1920	470		12.7%
1930	364		−22.6%
1940	423		16.2%
1950	464		9.7%
1960	428		−7.8%
1970	490		14.5%
1980	515		5.1%
1990	538		4.5%
2000	456		−15.2%
2010	590		29.4%
2020	662		12.2%
U.S. Decennial Census

As of the census of 2000, there were 456 people, 172 households, and 121 families residing in the village. The population density was 1,203.2 inhabitants per square mile (464.6/km^{2}). There were 198 housing units at an average density of 522.4 per square mile (201.7/km^{2}). The racial makeup of the village was 97.15% White, 0.88% African American, 0.66% Asian, 0.88% from other races, and 0.44% from two or more races. Hispanic or Latino of any race were 0.22% of the population.

There were 172 households, out of which 39.0% had children under the age of 18 living with them, 52.9% were married couples living together, 12.2% had a female householder with no husband present, and 29.1% were non-families. 24.4% of all households were made up of individuals, and 8.7% had someone living alone who was 65 years of age or older. The average household size was 2.65 and the average family size was 3.20.

In the village, the population was spread out, with 29.4% under the age of 18, 8.6% from 18 to 24, 31.6% from 25 to 44, 20.2% from 45 to 64, and 10.3% who were 65 years of age or older. The median age was 34 years. For every 100 females, there were 104.5 males. For every 100 females age 18 and over, there were 101.3 males.

The median income for a household in the village was $36,250, and the median income for a family was $42,212. Males had a median income of $34,583 versus $19,554 for females. The per capita income for the village was $16,906. About 3.2% of families and 3.2% of the population were below the poverty line, including 1.8% of those under age 18 and none of those age 65 or over.
