= Buckhart, Illinois =

- Unincorporated community
- Location within Illinois Location within the United States
- Coordinates: 39°44′59″N 89°26′41″W
- Country: United States
- State: Illinois
- County: Sangamon
- Elevation: 564 ft (172 m)
- Time zone: UTC-6 (Central (CST))
  - Summer (DST): UTC-5 (CDT)
- Area code: 217
- GNIS feature ID: 405120

Buckhart is an unincorporated community in Sangamon County, Illinois, United States. Buckhart is 4.5 miles (7.2 km) east of Rochester.
