= Edmund Harvel =

English diplomat

Edmund Harvel was a 16th-century English diplomat.

Harvel was the English ambassador to Venice in the 1540s, during the reign of Henry VIII.
