= Chatham Township, Sangamon County, Illinois =

Coordinates: 39°39′13″N 89°45′21″W

Chatham Township
- Township
- Location in Sangamon County

- Sangamon County's location in Illinois
- Country: United States
- State: Illinois
- County: Sangamon
- Established: November 6, 1860

Area
  - Total: 37.26 sq mi (96.5 km^{2})
  - Land: 37.23 sq mi (96.4 km^{2})
  - Water: 0.03 sq mi (0.078 km^{2}) 0.08%

Population (2010)
  - Estimate (2016): 7,450
  - Density: 187.4/sq mi (72.4/km^{2})
- Time zone: UTC-6 (CST)
  - Summer (DST): UTC-5 (CDT)
- FIPS code: 17-167-12697

Chatham Township is located in Sangamon County, Illinois. As of the 2010 census, its population was 6,978 and it contained 2,963 housing units. Chatham Township changed its name from Campbell Township on September 2, 1863.

== Geography ==
According to the 2010 census, the township has a total area of 37.26 square miles (96.5 km^{2}), of which 37.23 square miles (96.4 km^{2}) (or 99.92%) is land and 0.03 square miles (0.078 km^{2}) (or 0.08%) is water.

== Demographics ==
Historical population
Census	Pop.	Note	%±
2016 (est.)	7,450
U.S. Decennial Census
