= Divernon Township, Sangamon County, Illinois =

Coordinates: 39°34′05″N 89°39′34″W

Divernon Township
- Township
- Location in Sangamon County

- Sangamon County's location in Illinois
- Country: United States
- State: Illinois
- County: Sangamon
- Established: 1887

Area
  - Total: 27.28 sq mi (70.7 km^{2})
  - Land: 27.24 sq mi (70.6 km^{2})
  - Water: 0.03 sq mi (0.078 km^{2}) 0.11%

Population (2010)
  - Estimate (2016): 1,478
  - Density: 55.4/sq mi (21.4/km^{2})
- Time zone: UTC-6 (CST)
  - Summer (DST): UTC-5 (CDT)
- FIPS code: 17-167-20058

Divernon Township is located in Sangamon County, Illinois. As of the 2010 census, its population was 1,510 and it contained 677 housing units. Divernon Township formed from Pawnee Township in 1887.

== Geography ==
According to the 2010 census, the township has a total area of 27.28 square miles (70.7 km^{2}), of which 27.24 square miles (70.6 km^{2}) (or 99.85%) is land and 0.03 square miles (0.078 km^{2}) (or 0.11%) is water.

== Demographics ==
Historical population
Census	Pop.	Note	%±
2016 (est.)	1,478
U.S. Decennial Census
