= Mechanicsburg Township, Sangamon County, Illinois =

Coordinates: 39°49′47″N 89°25′49″W

Mechanicsburg Township
- Township
- Location in Sangamon County

- Sangamon County's location in Illinois
- Country: United States
- State: Illinois
- County: Sangamon
- Established: November 6, 1860

Government
  - Supervisor: Susan K Tapscott

Area
  - Total: 36.45 sq mi (94.4 km^{2})
  - Land: 36.44 sq mi (94.4 km^{2})
  - Water: 0.01 sq mi (0.026 km^{2}) 0.03%

Population (2010)
  - Estimate (2016): 2,294
  - Density: 62.9/sq mi (24.3/km^{2})
- Time zone: UTC-6 (CST)
  - Summer (DST): UTC-5 (CDT)
- FIPS code: 17-167-48034

Mechanicsburg Township is located in Sangamon County, Illinois. As of the 2010 census, its population was 2,293 and it contained 969 housing units.

== Geography ==
According to the 2010 census, the township has a total area of 36.45 square miles (94.4 km^{2}), of which 36.44 square miles (94.4 km^{2}) (or 99.97%) is land and 0.01 square miles (0.026 km^{2}) (or 0.03%) is water.

== Demographics ==
According to the 2020–2024 American Community Survey 5-year estimates, Mechanicsburg Township had an estimated population of 2,301 living in 947 households, with an average of 2.4 persons per household. The median age was 48.7 years. Approximately 90% of residents identified as White, 2% as Black, 6% as two or more races, and 1% as Hispanic or Latino. The median household income was $74,453, while the per capita income was $40,221. An estimated 11.7% of residents lived below the poverty line. Educational attainment was relatively high, with 95.1% of residents aged 25 and over holding a high school diploma or higher, while 19.6% held a bachelor's degree or higher.

== Recent News ==
In April 2026, the Sangamon County Board approved a $500 million data center in a 17 to 10 vote with one abstaining. The data center will be built by Dallas based CyrusOne and will be built in Talkington Township on 280 acres.
