= Loami Township, Sangamon County, Illinois =

Coordinates: 39°39′03″N 89°50′51″W

Loami Township
- Township
- Location in Sangamon County

- Sangamon County's location in Illinois
- Country: United States
- State: Illinois
- County: Sangamon
- Established: November 6, 1860

Area
  - Total: 21.16 sq mi (54.8 km^{2})
  - Land: 21.15 sq mi (54.8 km^{2})
  - Water: 0.01 sq mi (0.026 km^{2}) 0.05%

Population (2010)
  - Estimate (2016): 1,070
  - Density: 50.6/sq mi (19.5/km^{2})
- Time zone: UTC-6 (CST)
  - Summer (DST): UTC-5 (CDT)
- FIPS code: 17-167-44186

Loami Township is located in Sangamon County, Illinois. As of the 2010 census, its population was 1,070 and it contained 449 housing units.

== Geography ==
According to the 2010 census, the township has a total area of 21.16 square miles (54.8 km^{2}), of which 21.15 square miles (54.8 km^{2}) (or 99.95%) is land and 0.01 square miles (0.026 km^{2}) (or 0.05%) is water.

== Demographics ==
Historical population
Census	Pop.	Note	%±
2016 (est.)	1,070
U.S. Decennial Census

The population of Loami Township was 1,169 in the 2024, while the median age was 32.2. The median income was $42,228. The poverty rate was 10.4%.
