= King Township, Christian County, Illinois =

King Township
- Township
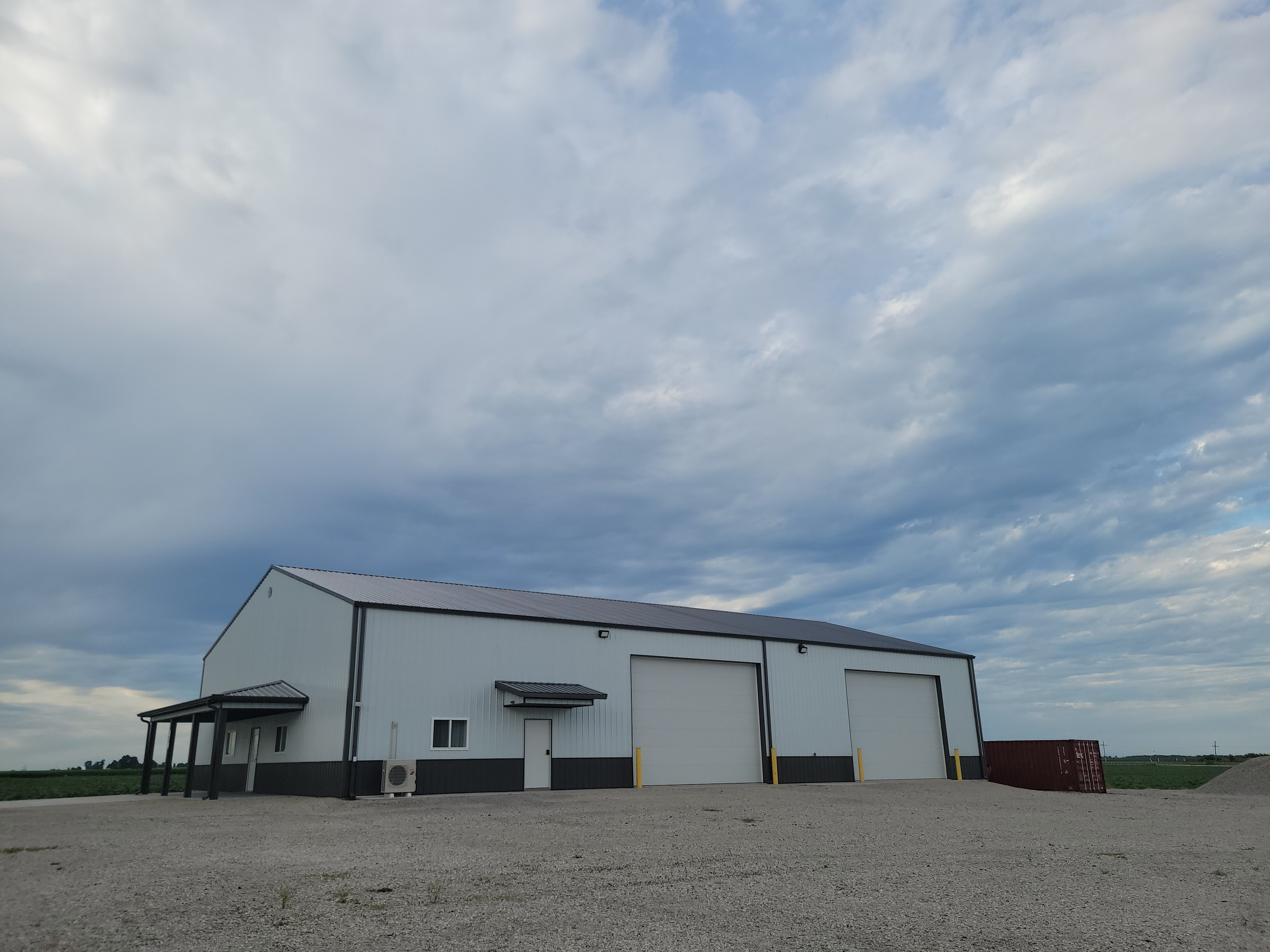
- Township building in Harvel

- Location in Christian County

- Christian County's location in Illinois
- Coordinates: 39°26′38″N 89°30′14″W
- Country: United States
- State: Illinois
- County: Christian
- Established: November 7, 1865

Area
  - Total: 36.66 sq mi (94.9 km^{2})
  - Land: 36.66 sq mi (94.9 km^{2})
  - Water: 0 sq mi (0 km^{2}) 0%
- Elevation: 633 ft (193 m)

Population (2020)
  - Total: 198
  - Density: 5.40/sq mi (2.09/km^{2})
- Time zone: UTC-6 (CST)
  - Summer (DST): UTC-5 (CDT)
- ZIP codes: 62538, 62546, 62558
- FIPS code: 17-021-39948

King Township is one of seventeen townships in Christian County, Illinois, USA. As of the 2020 census, its population was 198 and it contained 94 housing units.

== Geography ==
According to the 2010 census, the township has a total area of 36.66 square miles (94.9 km^{2}), all land.

=== Cities, towns, villages ===
- Harvel (partial)
- Morrisonville (west edge)

=== Cemeteries ===
The township contains these two cemeteries: Harvel and Morrisonville.

=== Major highways ===
- Illinois Route 48

=== Airports and landing strips ===
- Deal Landing Strip
- Seitz Landing Strip

== Demographics ==
Historical population
Census	Pop.	Note	%±
1870	413		—
1880	1,032		149.9%
1890	926		−10.3%
1900	882		−4.8%
1910	787		−10.8%
1920	700		−11.1%
1930	706		0.9%
1940	658		−6.8%
1950	517		−21.4%
1960	460		−11.0%
1970	360		−21.7%
1980	322		−10.6%
1990	271		−15.8%
2000	265		−2.2%
2010	244		−7.9%
2020	198		−18.9%
U.S. Decennial Census

As of the 2020 census there were 198 people, 86 households, and 67 families residing in the township. The population density was 5.40 inhabitants per square mile (2.08/km^{2}). There were 94 housing units at an average density of 2.56 per square mile (0.99/km^{2}). The racial makeup of the township was 92.93% White, 0.51% African American, 0.00% Native American, 0.00% Asian, 0.00% Pacific Islander, 1.52% from other races, and 5.05% from two or more races. Hispanic or Latino of any race were 0.51% of the population.

There were 86 households, out of which 25.60% had children under the age of 18 living with them, 65.12% were married couples living together, 12.79% had a female householder with no spouse present, and 22.09% were non-families. 18.60% of all households were made up of individuals, and none had someone living alone who was 65 years of age or older. The average household size was 2.41 and the average family size was 2.76.

The township's age distribution consisted of 11.1% under the age of 18, 12.6% from 18 to 24, 16.9% from 25 to 44, 43.4% from 45 to 64, and 15.9% who were 65 years of age or older. The median age was 52.7 years. For every 100 females, there were 102.9 males. For every 100 females age 18 and over, there were 114.0 males.

The median income for a household in the township was $90,167, and the median income for a family was $91,250. Males had a median income of $42,250 versus $14,375 for females. The per capita income for the township was $31,777. About 4.5% of families and 5.3% of the population were below the poverty line, including 4.3% of those under age 18 and none of those age 65 or over.

== School districts ==
- Morrisonville Community Unit School District 1
- Panhandle Community Unit School District 2
- Pawnee Community Unit School District 11

== Political districts ==
- State House District 98
- State Senate District 49
