= Grandview, Illinois =

Grandview
- Village
- Location of Grandview in Sangamon County, Illinois.
- Coordinates: 39°49′02″N 89°37′18″W
- Country: United States
- State: Illinois
- County: Sangamon

Area
  - Total: 0.34 sq mi (0.87 km^{2})
  - Land: 0.34 sq mi (0.87 km^{2})
  - Water: 0 sq mi (0.00 km^{2})
- Elevation: 597 ft (182 m)

Population (2020)
  - Total: 1,405
  - Density: 4,194/sq mi (1,619.2/km^{2})
- Time zone: UTC-6 (CST)
  - Summer (DST): UTC-5 (CDT)
- ZIP code: 62702
- Area code: 217
- FIPS code: 17-30835
- GNIS feature ID: 2398189
- Website: villageofgrandview.gov

Grandview is a village in Sangamon County, Illinois, United States. As of the 2020 census, Grandview had a population of 1,405. It is part of the Springfield, Illinois Metropolitan Statistical Area.

== Geography ==
According to the 2010 census, Grandview has a total area of 0.34 square miles (0.88 km^{2}), all land.

== Demographics ==
Historical population
Census	Pop.	Note	%±
1940	620		—
1950	1,349		117.6%
1960	2,214		64.1%
1970	2,242		1.3%
1980	1,794		−20.0%
1990	1,647		−8.2%
2000	1,537		−6.7%
2010	1,441		−6.2%
2020	1,405		−2.5%
U.S. Decennial Census

=== 2020 census ===
As of the 2020 census, Grandview had a population of 1,405. The median age was 39.7 years. 21.1% of residents were under the age of 18 and 16.8% of residents were 65 years of age or older. For every 100 females there were 96.8 males, and for every 100 females age 18 and over there were 95.9 males age 18 and over.

100.0% of residents lived in urban areas, while 0.0% lived in rural areas.

There were 628 households in Grandview, of which 28.7% had children under the age of 18 living in them. Of all households, 29.3% were married-couple households, 23.6% were households with a male householder and no spouse or partner present, and 34.6% were households with a female householder and no spouse or partner present. About 35.4% of all households were made up of individuals and 12.1% had someone living alone who was 65 years of age or older.

There were 691 housing units, of which 9.1% were vacant. The homeowner vacancy rate was 2.4% and the rental vacancy rate was 11.1%.

Racial composition as of the 2020 census
Race	Number	Percent
White	1,077	76.7%
Black or African American	203	14.4%
American Indian and Alaska Native	10	0.7%
Asian	8	0.6%
Native Hawaiian and Other Pacific Islander	0	0.0%
Some other race	6	0.4%
Two or more races	101	7.2%
Hispanic or Latino (of any race)	26	1.9%

=== 2000 census ===
As of the census of 2000, there were 1,537 people, 648 households, and 417 families residing in the village. The population density was 4,501.4 inhabitants per square mile (1,738.0/km^{2}). There were 685 housing units at an average density of 2,006.2 per square mile (774.6/km^{2}). The racial makeup of the village was 93.49% White, 4.75% African American, 0.20% Native American, 0.07% Asian, 0.20% from other races, and 1.30% from two or more races. Hispanic or Latino of any race were 0.52% of the population.

There were 648 households, out of which 27.3% had children under the age of 18 living with them, 45.4% were married couples living together, 13.9% had a female householder with no husband present, and 35.5% were non-families. 28.2% of all households were made up of individuals, and 11.4% had someone living alone who was 65 years of age or older. The average household size was 2.37 and the average family size was 2.89.

In the village, the population was spread out, with 23.6% under the age of 18, 7.5% from 18 to 24, 30.3% from 25 to 44, 21.5% from 45 to 64, and 17.1% who were 65 years of age or older. The median age was 38 years. For every 100 females, there were 94.1 males. For every 100 females age 18 and over, there were 86.6 males.

The median income for a household in the village was $36,349, and the median income for a family was $39,485. Males had a median income of $27,697 versus $22,279 for females. The per capita income for the village was $17,499. About 8.6% of families and 12.3% of the population were below the poverty line, including 22.3% of those under age 18 and 6.1% of those age 65 or over.

== Transportation ==
SMTD provides bus service on Routes 3 and 217 connecting Grandview to downtown Springfield and other destinations.

== Notable person ==
- Robert Carter (born 1945), justice of the Illinois Supreme Court from 2020 to 2022.
