= Waverly Community Unit School District 6 =

School district in Illinois, United States

Waverly Community Unit School District 6 201 North Miller

Location
- Waverly, Illinois, 62692; United States

District information
- NCES District ID: 1741280

Students and staff
- Students: 354 (in 2022–2023)
- Teachers: 22.82 (on an FTE basis)
- Student–teacher ratio: 12.54:1

Other information
- Website: www.wsd6.org

Waverly Community Unit School District 6 is a school district in Waverly, Illinois. It consists of two schools, Waverly Elementary School and Waverly High School. As of 2023 there were 354 students enrolled in the district, and employed 22.82 teachers (on an FTE basis).
