= Illiopolis Township, Sangamon County, Illinois =

Coordinates: 39°51′11″N 89°15′11″W

Illiopolis Township
- Township
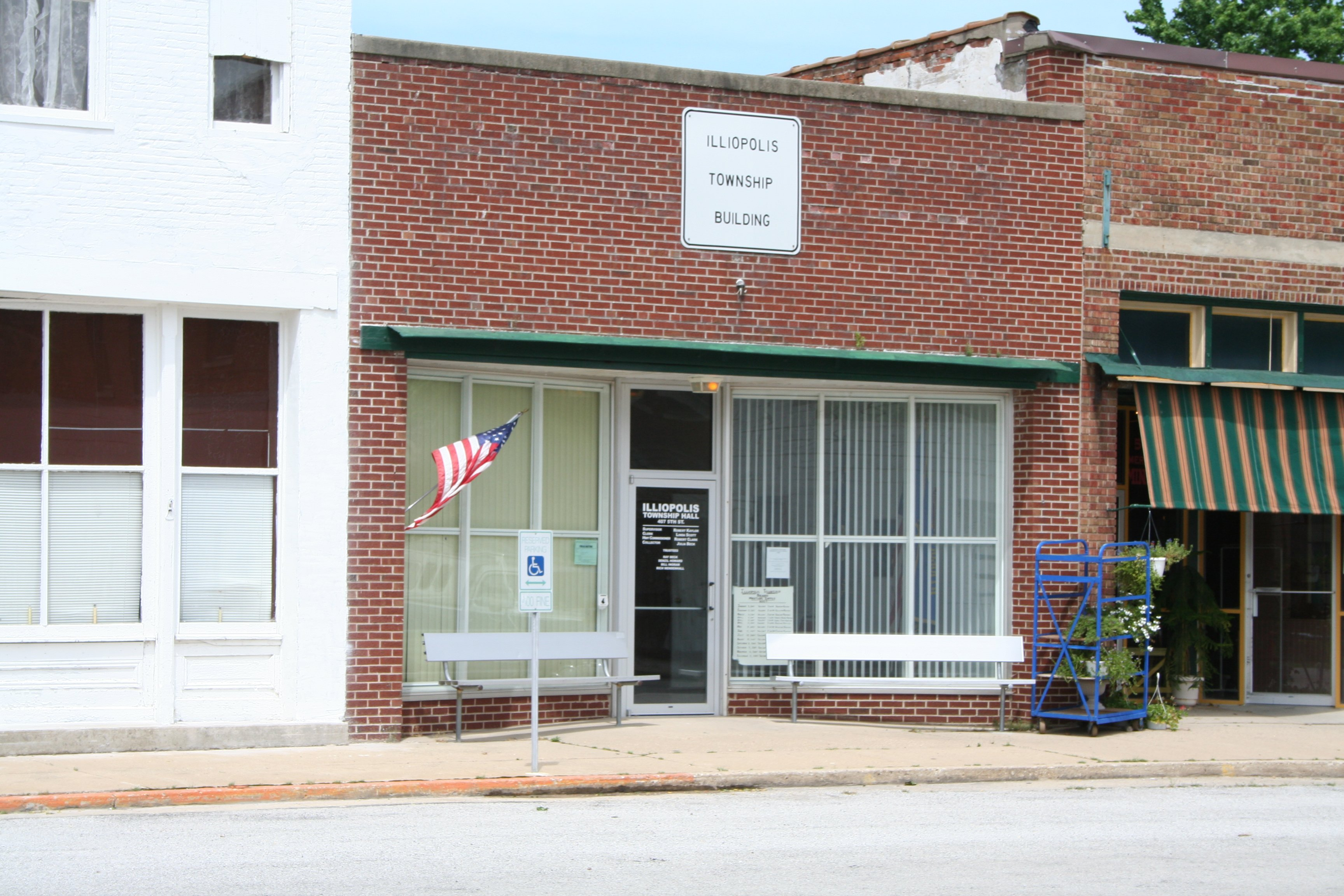
- Town hall

- Location in Sangamon County

- Sangamon County's location in Illinois
- Country: United States
- State: Illinois
- County: Sangamon
- Established: November 6, 1860

Area
  - Total: 34.01 sq mi (88.1 km^{2})
  - Land: 34.01 sq mi (88.1 km^{2})
  - Water: 0 sq mi (0 km^{2})

Population (2010)
  - Estimate (2016): 1,289
  - Density: 38.6/sq mi (14.9/km^{2})
- Time zone: UTC-6 (CST)
  - Summer (DST): UTC-5 (CDT)
- FIPS code: 17-167-37140

Illiopolis Township is located in Sangamon County, Illinois. As of the 2010 census, its population was 1,314 and it contained 555 housing units.

== Geography ==
According to the 2010 census, the township has a total area of 34.01 square miles (88.1 km^{2}), all land.

== History ==
Historical population
Census	Pop.	Note	%±
2016 (est.)	1,289
U.S. Decennial Census

In 1865, a new community in Illinois named Wilson was established. The name was soon changed to Illiopolis where it remains to this day. From 1941 to 1945, during World War II, a federal Ordnance plant that produced military supplies such as weapons, ammunition, and equipment, popped up. The plant covered 19,200 acres and employed 9,700. The residents in the surrounding areas were forced to leave, with many not returning even after the war ended.

From the founding of the township, Illiopolis was an agricultural community where most, if not all, of the businesses were directly or indirectly connected to farming in one way or the other. After a while, Illiopolis became a self sustaining community with many independently owned businesses and shops but after the Interstate Highway System came and the rise of automobiles grew, many of those shops and businesses faded into time.

== See also ==
- Sangamon Ordnance Plant, located in the township.
