= Pawnee Township, Sangamon County, Illinois =

Coordinates: 39°34′09″N 89°34′13″W

Pawnee Township
- Township
- Location in Sangamon County

- Sangamon County's location in Illinois
- Country: United States
- State: Illinois
- County: Sangamon
- Established: November 6, 1860

Area
  - Total: 27.11 sq mi (70.2 km^{2})
  - Land: 27.09 sq mi (70.2 km^{2})
  - Water: 0.02 sq mi (0.052 km^{2}) 0.07%

Population (2010)
  - Estimate (2016): 3,008
  - Density: 112.9/sq mi (43.6/km^{2})
- Time zone: UTC-6 (CST)
  - Summer (DST): UTC-5 (CDT)
- FIPS code: 17-167-58187

Pawnee Township is located in Sangamon County, Illinois, United States. As of the 2010 census, its population was 3,058 and it contained 1,275 housing units.

== Geography ==
According to the 2010 census, the township has a total area of 27.11 square miles (70.2 km^{2}), of which 27.09 square miles (70.2 km^{2}) (or 99.93%) is land and 0.02 square miles (0.052 km^{2}) (or 0.07%) is water.

== Demographics ==
Historical population
| Census | Pop. | Note | %± |
|---|---|---|---|
| 2016 (est.) | 3,008 |
U.S. Decennial Census
