= Waverly, Illinois =

- City
- Location in Morgan County, Illinois
- Coordinates: 39°35′33″N 89°57′10″W
- Country: United States
- State: Illinois
- County: Morgan

Government
  - Type: Mayor-Council

Area
  - Total: 1.03 sq mi (2.68 km^{2})
  - Land: 1.03 sq mi (2.68 km^{2})
  - Water: 0 sq mi (0.00 km^{2})
- Elevation: 686 ft (209 m)

Population (2020)
  - Total: 1,194
  - Density: 1,153/sq mi (445.1/km^{2})
- Time zone: UTC-6 (CST)
  - Summer (DST): UTC-5 (CDT)
- ZIP Code: 62692
- Area code: 217
- FIPS code: 17-79358
- GNIS feature ID: 2397225
- Website: www.waverlyil.com

Waverly, founded in 1836, is the second largest city in Morgan County, Illinois, United States. The population was 1,194 at the 2020 census. It is part of the Jacksonville Micropolitan Statistical Area. The town was named after the Waverley novels of Sir Walter Scott.

== Geography ==
Waverly is in southeastern Morgan County, 26 miles (42 km) southwest of Springfield, the state capital. Illinois Route 104 passes through the city as Elm Street, leading northwest 19 miles (31 km) to Jacksonville, the county seat, and east 11 miles (18 km) to Auburn. Illinois Route 111 has its northern terminus at IL 104 on the west side of Waverly; it leads south 11 miles (18 km) to Palmyra.

According to the U.S. Census Bureau, Waverly has a total area of 1.04 square miles (2.69 km^{2}), all land. Almost all of the city drains south to tributaries of Apple Creek, a west-flowing tributary of the Illinois River. The northeast corner of the city drains toward the South Fork of Lick Creek, a northeast-flowing stream that is part of the Sangamon River watershed.

Waverly is the geographical center of the Illinois Community College District #526, which is served by Lincoln Land Community College in Springfield.

== Demographics ==
Historical population
Census	Pop.	Note	%±
1880	1,124		—
1890	1,337		19.0%
1900	1,573		17.7%
1910	1,538		−2.2%
1920	1,510		−1.8%
1930	1,390		−7.9%
1940	1,385		−0.4%
1950	1,330		−4.0%
1960	1,375		3.4%
1970	1,442		4.9%
1980	1,537		6.6%
1990	1,402		−8.8%
2000	1,346		−4.0%
2010	1,307		−2.9%
2020	1,194		−8.6%
U.S. Decennial Census

=== 2020 census ===
As of the 2020 census, Waverly had a population of 1,194. The median age was 40.7 years. 23.0% of residents were under the age of 18 and 21.0% of residents were 65 years of age or older. For every 100 females there were 90.4 males, and for every 100 females age 18 and over there were 84.5 males age 18 and over.

0.0% of residents lived in urban areas, while 100.0% lived in rural areas.

There were 524 households in Waverly, of which 30.5% had children under the age of 18 living in them. Of all households, 43.3% were married-couple households, 18.3% were households with a male householder and no spouse or partner present, and 30.9% were households with a female householder and no spouse or partner present. About 32.1% of all households were made up of individuals and 16.2% had someone living alone who was 65 years of age or older.

There were 577 housing units, of which 9.2% were vacant. The homeowner vacancy rate was 2.7% and the rental vacancy rate was 5.2%.

Racial composition as of the 2020 census
Race	Number	Percent
White	1,104	92.5%
Black or African American	13	1.1%
American Indian and Alaska Native	6	0.5%
Asian	9	0.8%
Native Hawaiian and Other Pacific Islander	2	0.2%
Some other race	4	0.3%
Two or more races	56	4.7%
Hispanic or Latino (of any race)	18	1.5%

=== Demographic estimates ===
The estimated median household income in 2019: $51,630, $36,111 in 2000. The estimated per capita income in 2019: $25,548, $18,205 in 2000. The estimated median house or condo value in 2019: $83,532, $56,400 in 2000. The percentage of residents living in poverty in 2019: 7.6%. 40.1% of students that attend Waverly Community Unit School District 6, are listed as low income students: students eligible to receive free or reduced-price lunches, live in substitute care, or whose families receive public aid.

== Sports ==
Waverly is the home of the Waverly Holiday Tournament, the longest running Class 1A holiday basketball tournament in the state of Illinois, for high school boys' basketball in December every year since 1951.

== Notable people ==
- Herk Harvey, film director, Carnival of Souls
- Ralph C. Smedley, founder of Toastmasters International
