= Auburn Township, Sangamon County, Illinois =

Coordinates: 39°34′03″N 89°45′38″W

Auburn Township
- Township
- Location in Sangamon County

- Sangamon County's location in Illinois
- Country: United States
- State: Illinois
- County: Sangamon
- Established: November 6, 1860

Area
  - Total: 35.78 sq mi (92.7 km^{2})
  - Land: 35.78 sq mi (92.7 km^{2})
  - Water: 0 sq mi (0 km^{2}) 0%

Population (2010)
  - Estimate (2016): 6,243
  - Density: 177/sq mi (68/km^{2})
- Time zone: UTC-6 (CST)
  - Summer (DST): UTC-5 (CDT)
- FIPS code: 17-167-02928

Auburn Township is located in Sangamon County, Illinois. As of the 2010 census, its population was 6,333 and it contained 2,513 housing units. It contains the city of Auburn, for which it is named, and the village of Thayer.

== Geography ==
According to the 2010 census, the township has a total area of 35.78 square miles (92.7 km^{2}), all land.

== Demographics ==
Historical population
Census	Pop.	Note	%±
2016 (est.)	6,243
U.S. Decennial Census
