= New City, Illinois =

New City
- Unincorporated community
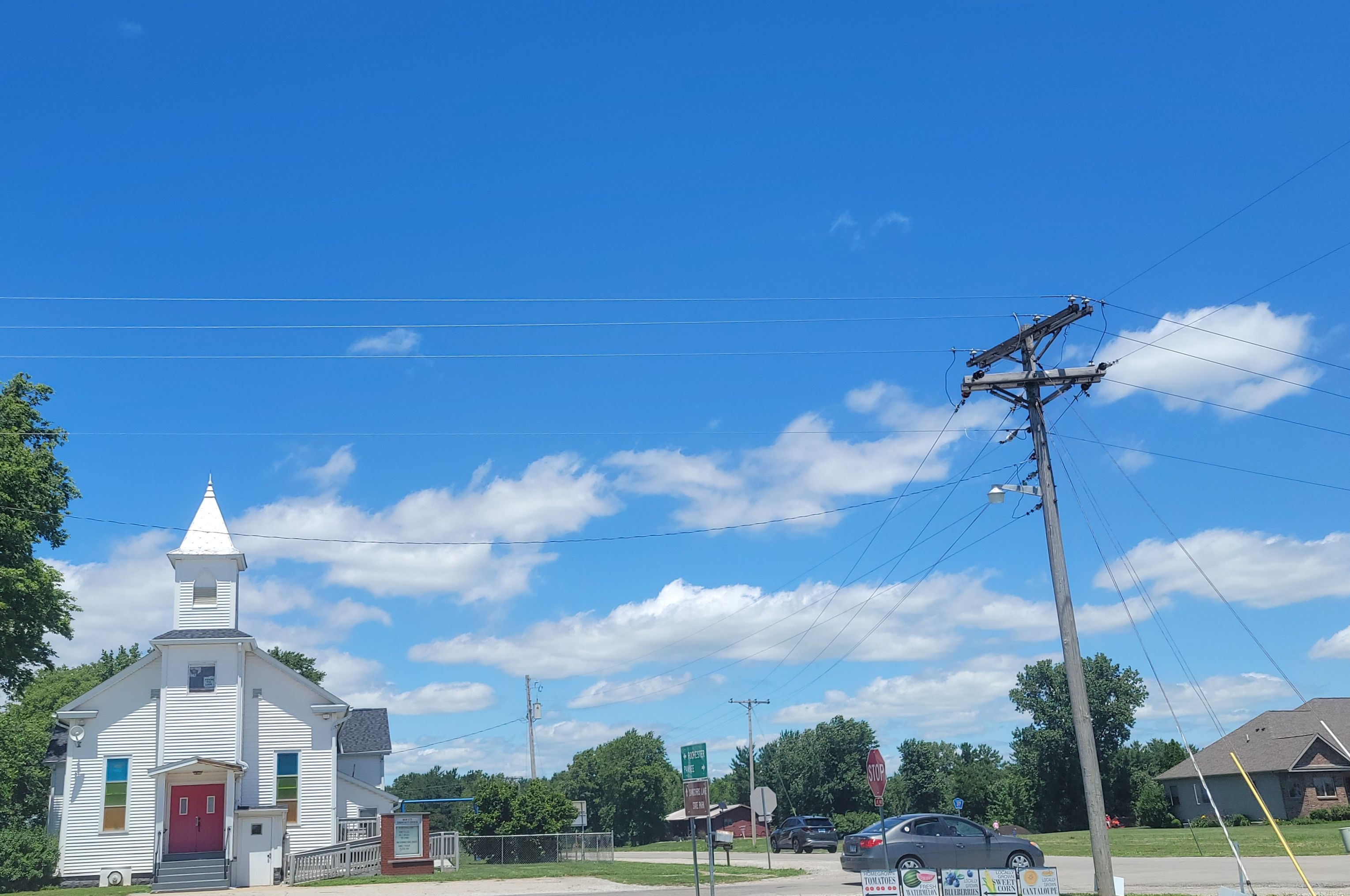
- New City crossroads and church

- Location of New City within Illinois New City (the United States)
- Coordinates: 39°40′09″N 89°32′21″W
- Country: United States
- State: Illinois
- County: Sangamon
- Township: Cotton Hill
- Time zone: UTC-6 (CST)
  - Summer (DST): UTC-5 (CDT)

New City is an unincorporated community in Cotton Hill Township, Sangamon County, Illinois, United States, in the rural center of the state. It is part of the Springfield, Illinois Metropolitan Statistical Area.

== Geography ==
New City is widely recognized by local residents as being the small area surrounding the intersection of County Highway 40 (recognized as Cardinal Hill Road/New City-Pawnee Road) and County Highway 37 (recognized as New City-Chatham/New City-Sangchris). It is located a short distance from Rochester, Illinois and the much larger Springfield, Illinois. Most residents who live in or near New City have Rochester, IL mailing addresses under the zip code "62563". Some residents living to the south of the town are under the Pawnee mailing system.

=== Hunter Lake ===
Much of Cotton Hill Township, and part of New City, could be condemned as a reservoir bed if the City of Springfield is granted planning permission to build Hunter Lake, a reservoir for use by City Water, Light & Power as a backup water storage facility for Lake Springfield. The City of Springfield has purchased much of the land that would be affected by the lake, but concerns remain. Final construction permission by the U.S. Army Corps of Engineers had not yet been given as of September 2016. The project has been discussed for over a decade, leading some to believe that the city will not go through with the project.

== Economy ==
New City is almost entirely agricultural, surrounded by many farms who mostly grow corn and soybeans.

Located in the center of town is the New City Community Church (a non-denominational Christian church). New City also has a greenhouse located not far (to the West) from the main intersection. At one time, there was a bait shop in New City, but it has since closed.

== Government ==
Not having a village government or officials, New City is governed locally by Cotton Hill Township and Sangamon County. While major roads and police protection are provided by the county, smaller roads and general assistance are provided by the township.

== Education ==
New City and most of the surrounding area is part of the Ball-Chatham School District. It borders Rochester School District to the north, Pawnee School District to the south, and the Kincaid School District farther east.
