= Lick Creek (Sangamon River tributary) =

Physical characteristics
- Source
  - location: Morgan County north of Waverly, Illinois
  - coordinates: 39°39′10″N 89°58′41″W
- Mouth
  - location: Confluence with Sugar Creek in Lake Springfield, Illinois
  - coordinates: 39°42′25″N 89°41′11″W
  - elevation: 574 ft (175 m)
- Length: 30 mi (48 km)

Basin features
- Progression: Lick Creek → Sugar Creek → Sangamon → Illinois → Mississippi → Gulf of Mexico
- GNIS ID: 412056

Lick Creek is a 30.6-mile-long (49.2 km) tributary of Lake Springfield and thus a tributary of the Sangamon River in central Illinois. It drains a large portion of southwestern Sangamon County and a marginal adjacent fragment of southeastern Morgan County. The drainage of Lick Creek includes all of Loami, Illinois and part of Chatham, Illinois.

Much of the Lick Creek drainage is intensely farmed arable land. The drainage also contains 460-acre (1.9 km^{2}) of Wildlife Preserve natural area. When land parcels were condemned for Lake Springfield in the 1920s and 1930s, a large section of the lower Lick Creek bottomland was set aside as woodland to protect the lake's water quality. This 340-acre (1.4 km^{2}) riparian zone was designated as the Lick Creek Wildlife Preserve by its owner, the Springfield, Illinois-based City Water, Light & Power, in 1991. According to Sangamon County, the watershed protection zone contains a notable grove of mixed sugar maples and chinkapin oaks. One chinkapin, located in Camp Widjiwagan, has been dated at more than 300 years of age. In addition, a 120-acre (0.49 km^{2}) creekside parcel, the Nipper Wildlife Sanctuary near Loami, has been redesignated for restoration as tallgrass prairie.

Lick Creek gave its name to a short-lived Fourierite phalanx, a Utopian socialist community that operated near Loami in 1845–1846.

The Interurban Trail, a local bike trail, bridges the Lick Creek arm of Lake Springfield. The bridge area forms a local fishing hole.

The U.S. Geographic Names Information System (GNIS) shows 12 streams bearing the name Lick Creek in Illinois.
