= Dallman Power Plant =

Coal-fired power plant in Illinois

V. Y. Dallman Generating Station
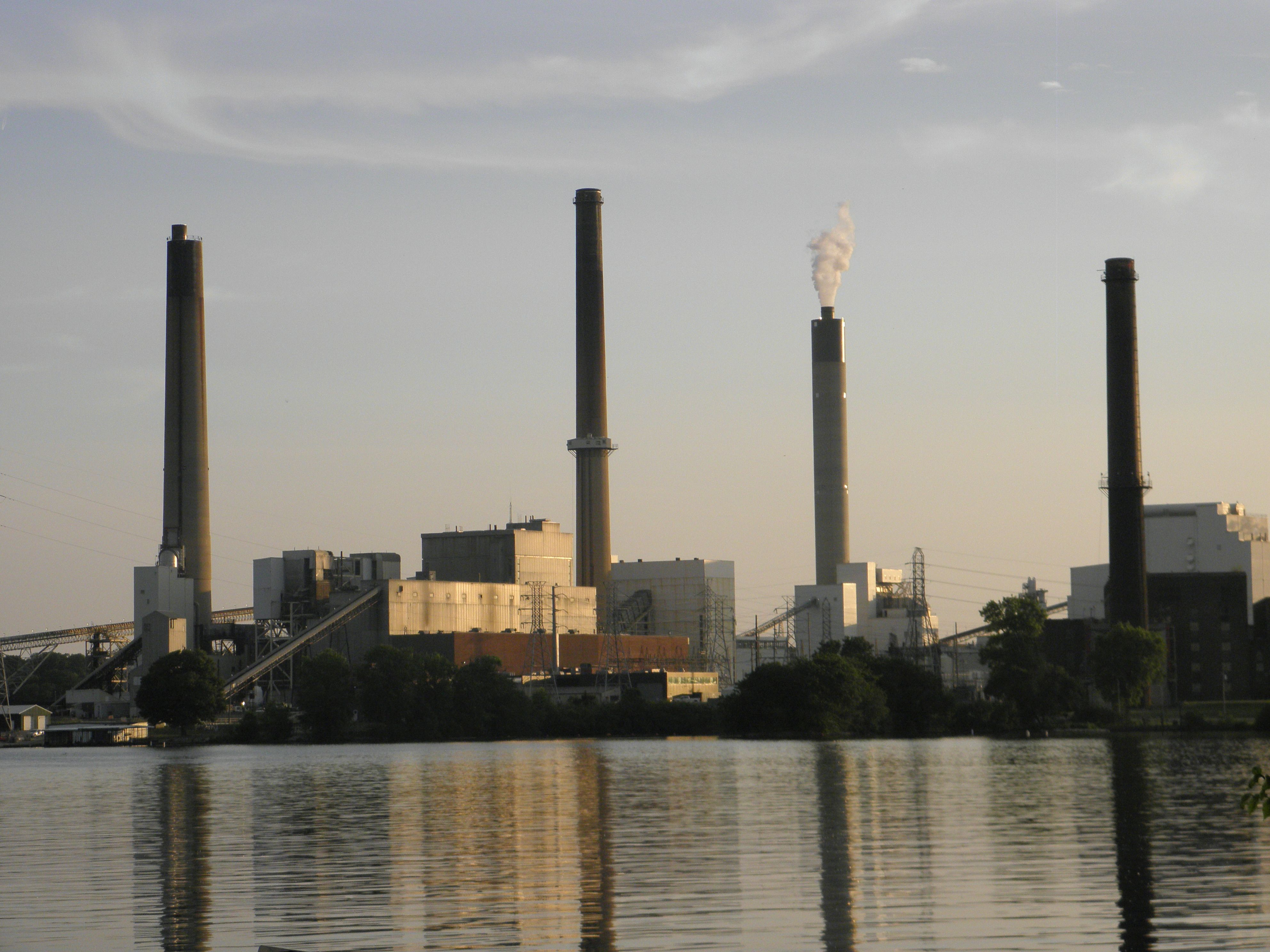
- Dallman Power Plant viewed from Tom Madonia Park East. The three decommissioned units are in the foreground while the newest unit 4 is in the background.
- Country: United States
- Location: Springfield, Illinois
- Coordinates: 39°45′17.6″N 89°36′06.5″W
- Owner: City Water, Light & Power

Power generation
- Nameplate capacity: 207 MW

The V.Y. Dallman Power Station is a coal-fired power plant located in Springfield, Illinois, at the north end of Lake Springfield. It is owned and operated by the city-owned utility City Water, Light & Power. The plant operates on pulverized coal supplied by truck from an Illinois coal mine, and takes its cooling water from Lake Springfield.

Dallman consists of four units, built in 1968, 1972, 1978, and 2009. Only the most recently built unit is still operating.

== History ==
Dallman is the second CWLP power plant built on the shores of Lake Springfield. The first, Lakeside Power Plant, was completed in 1936. Although largely supplanted by Dallman, Lakeside remained in partial operation to meet customer load until it was decommissioned in 2009 when Dallman Unit 4 was brought online. The Lakeside plant is now vacant.

The Dallman plant was named for Vincent Y. Dallman, former owner of the Illinois State Register, whose advocacy was credited with making Springfield the first US city to sell power to its citizens rather than only using it for streetlights.

Units 1 and 2 of the Dallman Plant were completed in 1968 and 1972 respectively. Later renamed Units 31 and 32, they each had nameplate capacities of 72 megawatts (MW). A scrubber was installed on these units in 2001. Both units were retired in 2020 under an Integrated Resource Plan.

Unit 3 (later renamed Unit 33) was completed in 1978, and had a nameplate capacity of 192 MW, more than doubling the amount of power the plant could generate. In 1980 a scrubber was placed on the Unit 3 smokestack to remove sulfur dioxide, a concern because of the plant's use of Illinois coal, which is high in sulfur. Unit 3 was permanently retired in 2021 after suffering storm damage (it had previously been scheduled for retirement in 2023).

Unit 4 was completed in 2009 at a cost of $515 million. The smokestack is 440 feet high. The unit's construction was made possible in part by a 2006 agreement between the City of Springfield and the Sierra Club that included closing the remaining Lakeside Power Plant units and investing in renewable energy. It was the first such agreement in the US to implement the provisions of the Kyoto Protocol.

== Inputs ==
Historically, the Dallman plant burned coal from the Viper Mine in nearby Elkhart. In 2024, the Viper Mine became inactive and other mines supplied coal to Dallman. The Dallman plant was formerly served by a railroad spur line, but today all coal is supplied by truck.

The plant receives "once-through" cooling water from Lake Springfield.

== Outputs ==
As of 2021, the plant has a generating capacity of 207 MW. Although CWLP also operates three peaker plants, Dallman was responsible for 99.9% of CWLP's power generation in 2022.

Coal ash from Dallman is placed in a coal ash pond near the plant in the Sugar Creek valley downstream of Lake Springfield. The Dallman pond, built in 1976 and expanded in the 1980s, is next to a pond that holds ash from the Lakeside plant. A 2022 report by Environmental Integrity Project and Earthjustice found that the Dallman ash pond was responsible for highly elevated levels of arsenic and boron in nearby groundwater.
