= Buffalo Hart, Illinois =

- Unincorporated community
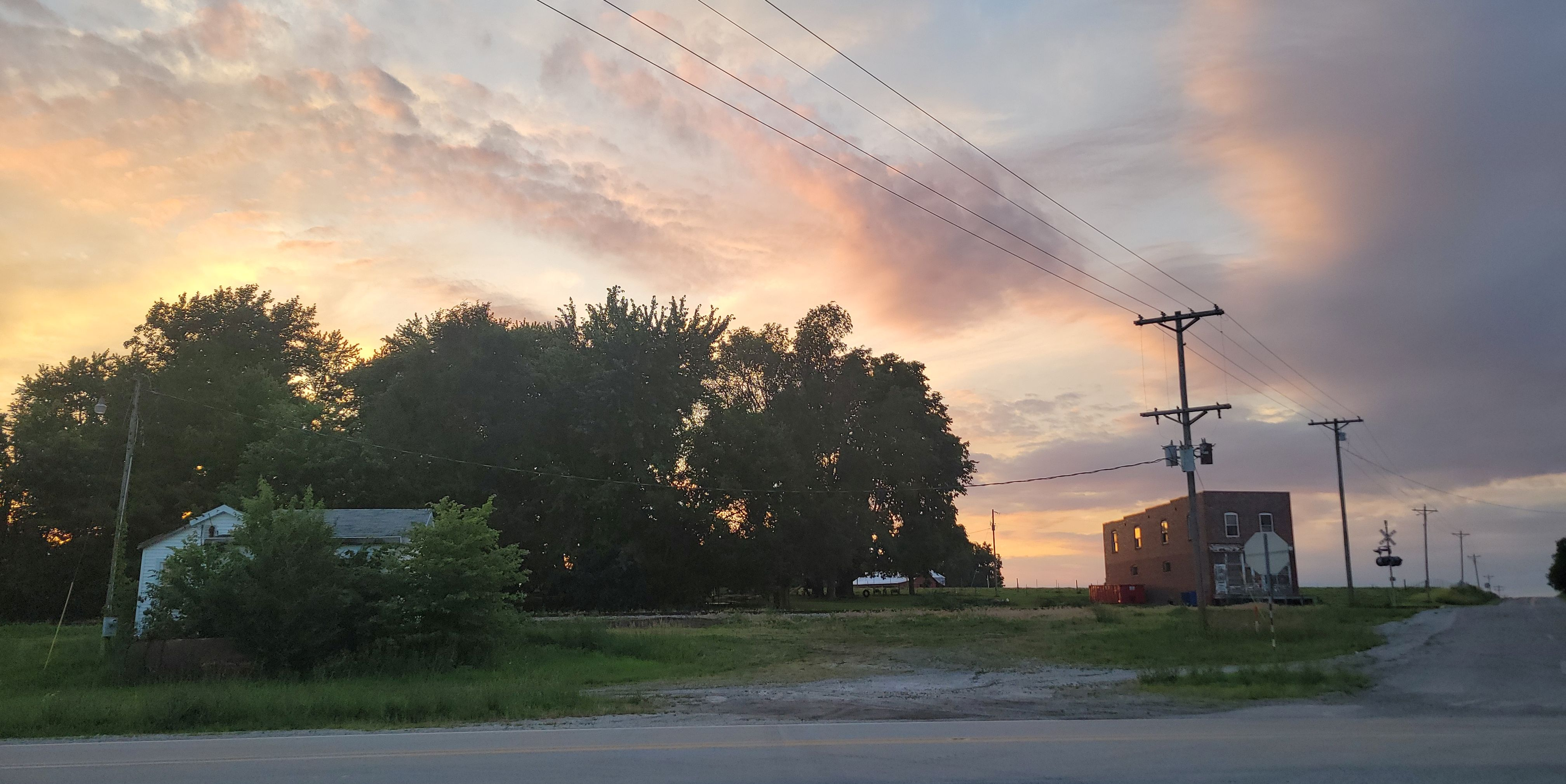
- Railroad crossing at Buffalo Hart, with former post office and general store in background.

- Location within Illinois Location within the United States
- Coordinates: 39°54′50″N 89°26′51″W
- Country: United States
- State: Illinois
- County: Sangamon
- Township: Buffalo Hart
- Elevation: 623 ft (190 m)
- Time zone: UTC-6 (Central (CST))
  - Summer (DST): UTC-5 (CDT)
- Area code: 217
- GNIS feature ID: 405160

Buffalo Hart is an unincorporated community in northern Sangamon County in the U.S. state of Illinois. It is the population center of Buffalo Hart Township.

Buffalo Hart was originally built in the 19th century, first as a frontier settlement based on a prairie grove, and then as a rural station stop on the Gilman, Clinton and Springfield Railroad twelve miles northeast of Springfield, Illinois, the state capital. Farmers would bring fresh vegetables and milk to the now-vanished railroad station for transportation into nearby cities. The railroad's successor-in-interest, the Canadian National, continues to operate a right-of-way that passes through Buffalo Hart.

A small grove of trees about 0.5 miles south of the village, which originally stood out amongst the tallgrass prairie grassland of central Illinois, has long been called "Buffalo Hart." A three-acre remnant of the white oak grove has been preserved for public use as the Robert Burns Memorial Park. Buffalo Hart Grove had a post office as early as 1837, but it closed in 1967. The crossroads general store closed about 1971 and the trackside grain elevator was no longer in active use as of 2012. The unincorporated community is part of the Springfield, Illinois metropolitan area, and is served by Illinois Route 54.

== See also ==
- Elkhart, Illinois, a nearby grove with a similar ecology and pioneer history.
