= Buffalo Hart Township =

Buffalo Hart Township may refer to:

- Buffalo Hart Township, Sangamon County, Illinois
- Buffalo Hart Township, McDonald County, Missouri, in McDonald County, Missouri
