= CWLP =

CWLP may refer to:

== Utilities ==
- City Water, Light & Power, a public utility owned by the City of Springfield, Illinois.

== Organizations ==
- The Center for Work-Life Policy, a New York City-based think tank.
- Commonwealth Labour Party, a former minor political party in Northern Ireland.
