= Jeremy Nunes =

American comedian, actor, author and politician

Jeremy Nunes is an American comedian, actor, author, and politician. He is a performer in the genres of corporate and Christian comedy.

== Political career ==
Nunes was first elected to office in April 2011. In a five-way race for Village Trustee of Dawson, Illinois, Nunes won with 32 percent of the vote. In April 2013, Nunes was elected Village President of Dawson, Illinois. He defeated incumbent Bob Day, carrying 77 percent of the vote. In December 2016, Nunes announced he would not run for re-election and his term expired in May 2017.

While Mayor, Nunes received significant press coverage. He was awarded "40 Under Forty" by the Springfield Business Journal. The State Journal-Register featured multiple stories about him. One featured his balance of comedy and local politics and another discusses his steps to manage a flood crisis while Mayor. The paper also featured Nunes's idea of a town beautification contest.

In 2016, Nunes was dubbed "Illinois' Funniest Mayor" by the Illinois Times.

== Author ==
Nunes wrote an Amazon best-selling humor book, retelling his time as mayor, titled You Can't Write City Hall. The book received promotion and accolades from The Epoch Times and Midwest Book Review.

Nunes appeared on Huckabee to both perform and promote the book. Nunes also appeared on the Adam Kokesh podcast Adam vs the Man to promote the book and discuss his political career.

== Entertainment career ==
Nunes is a graduate of The Second City and iO Theaters. He first began doing comedy in 2002, moving to Chicago after winning a local comedy competition.

He has had numerous small acting roles, including The Empty Man, Lincoln's Secret Killer, The Layover, and Final Witness.

Nunes has a comedy special on Dry Bar Comedy titled Neighborhood Sasq-Watch and an Amazon Prime special titled Who's With Me?!, which released in 2020.

Nunes has been featured on Focus on the Family, profiling his time as mayor and clips of his standup comedy.

Nunes was named "Best Comedian" by the Illinois Times in 2020 and 2025.

His comedy album releases include Cleaned Up (2015), Jeremy Nunes is In Your House (2018), and Who's with Me?! (2020).
