= Elkhart Township =

Elkhart Township may refer to:

== Illinois ==
- Elkhart Township, Logan County, Illinois

== Indiana ==
- Elkhart Township, Elkhart County, Indiana
- Elkhart Township, Noble County, Indiana

== Iowa ==
- Elkhart Township, Polk County, Iowa

== Missouri ==
- Elkhart Township, Bates County, Missouri
