= Cornland, Illinois =

- Census-designated place
- Interactive map of Cornland, Illinois
- Coordinates: 39°56′15″N 89°24′06″W
- Country: United States
- State: Illinois
- County: Logan
- Township: Elkhart

Area
  - Total: 0.097 sq mi (0.25 km^{2})
  - Land: 0.097 sq mi (0.25 km^{2})
  - Water: 0 sq mi (0.00 km^{2})
- Elevation: 604 ft (184 m)

Population (2020)
  - Total: 89
  - Density: 938.6/sq mi (362.41/km^{2})
- Time zone: UTC-6 (CST)
  - Summer (DST): UTC-5 (CDT)
- Postal code: 62519
- FIPS code: 17-16431
- GNIS feature ID: 2628547

Cornland is an unincorporated community and census-designated place in Logan County, Illinois. As of the 2020 census, Cornland had a population of 89.

== History ==
Cornland was laid out and platted in 1871 when the Gilman, Clinton & Springfield Railroad was extended to that point. A post office called Cornland has been in operation since 1872.

== Geography ==
According to the 2021 census gazetteer files, Cornland has a total area of 0.10 square miles (0.26 km^{2}), all land.

Cornland lies on the rolling flat land of the Sangamon River drainage area situated near the bottom grounds of Lake Fork Creek.

== Demographics ==
As of the 2020 census there were 89 people, 37 households, and 17 families residing in the CDP. The population density was 936.84 inhabitants per square mile (361.72/km^{2}). There were 40 housing units at an average density of 421.05 per square mile (162.57/km^{2}). The racial makeup of the CDP was 96.63% White, 1.12% African American, 1.12% Native American, 0.00% Asian, 0.00% Pacific Islander, 0.00% from other races, and 1.12% from two or more races. Hispanic or Latino of any race were 0.00% of the population.

There were 37 households, out of which 0.0% had children under the age of 18 living with them, 45.95% were married couples living together, 0.00% had a female householder with no husband present, and 54.05% were non-families. 0.00% of all households were made up of individuals, and 0.00% had someone living alone who was 65 years of age or older. The average household size was 1.82 and the average family size was 1.92.

The CDP's age distribution consisted of 0.0% under the age of 18, 0.0% from 18 to 24, 56.3% from 25 to 44, 23.9% from 45 to 64, and 19.7% who were 65 years of age or older. The median age was 32.8 years. For every 100 females, there were 108.8 males. For every 100 females age 18 and over, there were 108.8 males.

The per capita income for the CDP was $38,528.

Historical population
Census	Pop.	Note	%±
2020	89		—
U.S. Decennial Census

== Education ==
It is in the Mount Pulaski Community Unit School District 23.
