= Douglas Township, Iroquois County, Illinois =

Douglas Township
- Township
- Location in Iroquois County

- Iroquois County's location in Illinois
- Coordinates: 40°46′14″N 88°00′15″W
- Country: United States
- State: Illinois
- County: Iroquois
- Established: May 1858

Area
  - Total: 44.72 sq mi (115.8 km^{2})
  - Land: 44.66 sq mi (115.7 km^{2})
  - Water: 0.07 sq mi (0.18 km^{2}) 0.15%
- Elevation: 653 ft (199 m)

Population (2020)
  - Total: 2,049
  - Density: 45.88/sq mi (17.71/km^{2})
- Time zone: UTC-6 (CST)
  - Summer (DST): UTC-5 (CDT)
- ZIP codes: 60930, 60938, 60955, 60959, 60970
- FIPS code: 17-075-20487

Douglas Township is one of twenty-six townships in Iroquois County, Illinois, USA. As of the 2020 census, its population was 2,049 and it contained 897 housing units. Douglas Township was formed from a portion of Onarga Township in May 1858.

== Geography ==
According to the 2021 census gazetteer files, Douglas Township has a total area of 44.72 square miles (115.82 km^{2}), of which 44.66 square miles (115.67 km^{2}) (or 99.85%) is land and 0.07 square miles (0.18 km^{2}) (or 0.15%) is water.

=== Cities, towns, villages ===
- Gilman

=== Unincorporated towns ===
- La Hogue at 40.763368°N 88.088099°W
- Leonard at 40.768646°N 87.921982°W

(This list is based on USGS data and may include former settlements.)

=== Cemeteries ===
The township contains Wenger Cemetery and St. Mary's Cemetery.

=== Major highways ===
- Interstate 57
- U.S. Route 24
- U.S. Route 45

=== Airports and landing strips ===
- Kuiper Landing Strip

== Demographics ==
As of the 2020 census there were 2,049 people, 735 households, and 474 families residing in the township. The population density was 45.82 inhabitants per square mile (17.69/km^{2}). There were 897 housing units at an average density of 20.06 per square mile (7.75/km^{2}). The racial makeup of the township was 82.24% White, 0.49% African American, 0.68% Native American, 0.29% Asian, 0.00% Pacific Islander, 9.13% from other races, and 7.17% from two or more races. Hispanic or Latino of any race were 18.35% of the population.

There were 735 households, out of which 29.90% had children under the age of 18 living with them, 51.97% were married couples living together, 7.48% had a female householder with no spouse present, and 35.51% were non-families. 31.30% of all households were made up of individuals, and 15.80% had someone living alone who was 65 years of age or older. The average household size was 2.38 and the average family size was 2.99.

The township's age distribution consisted of 21.7% under the age of 18, 6.5% from 18 to 24, 26% from 25 to 44, 24.5% from 45 to 64, and 21.2% who were 65 years of age or older. The median age was 41.4 years. For every 100 females, there were 93.0 males. For every 100 females age 18 and over, there were 89.0 males.

The median income for a household in the township was $58,229, and the median income for a family was $70,156. Males had a median income of $53,083 versus $24,048 for females. The per capita income for the township was $26,977. About 6.3% of families and 10.4% of the population were below the poverty line, including 10.4% of those under age 18 and 7.4% of those age 65 or over.

Historical population
| Census | Pop. | Note | %± |
|---|---|---|---|
| 2000 | 2,116 | | — |
| 2010 | 2,104 | | −0.6% |
| 2020 | 2,049 | | −2.6% |
U.S. Decennial Census

== School districts ==
- Crescent Iroquois Community Unit School District 249
- Iroquois West Community Unit School District 10
- Tri Point Community Unit School District 6-J

== Political districts ==
- Illinois' 15th congressional district
- State House District 105
- State Senate District 53
