= Nipper Wildlife Sanctuary =

Wildlife sanctuary in Illinois, United States

Coordinates: 39.64934°N 89.82536°W

- Interactive map of Nipper Wildlife Sanctuary
- Nearest city: Loami
- Area: 120-acre (49 ha)
- Created: 1992
- Founder: Frank and Gladys Nipper

The Nipper Wildlife Sanctuary is a 120-acre (49 ha) private-sector nonprofit park and wildlife sanctuary located near Loami in the U.S. state of Illinois. Operated by a private land trust, the sanctuary commemorates its benefactors, farmers Frank and Gladys Nipper, who donated the land used to replant and endow the sanctuary. The Nipper Sanctuary specializes in the recreation of the former tallgrass prairie once common in central Illinois.

== History and description ==
Farmer Frank Nipper died in 1989, leaving land and money to endow the prairie land parcel. The estate established the sanctuary in 1992, starting the legal work that enabled the replanting to begin. Gladys Nipper, his widow, oversaw establishment of the sanctuary land trust before also dying in 1995.

Sangamon County, the central Illinois county in which the Nipper Sanctuary is located, at the time of settlement was approximately 70 percent tallgrass prairie. Virtually all of this habitat was plowed up for agricultural purposes. Plants typical of central Illinois prairies survived in remnants located in adjacent areas of Illinois that escaped the plow, and starting in 1999 approximately 150 species of flowers and plants were replanted in the former farmland of the Sanctuary. These forbs and grasses, in turn, entice prairie insect life and birdlife to the sanctuary.

The sanctuary is located at 9560 Withers Road, along Lick Creek approximately two miles southeast of Loami, Illinois. The nearest limited-access highway exit is Exit 82 on Interstate 72.
