= Adam Bogardus =

American sports shooter (1834–1913)

Adam Henry Bogardus
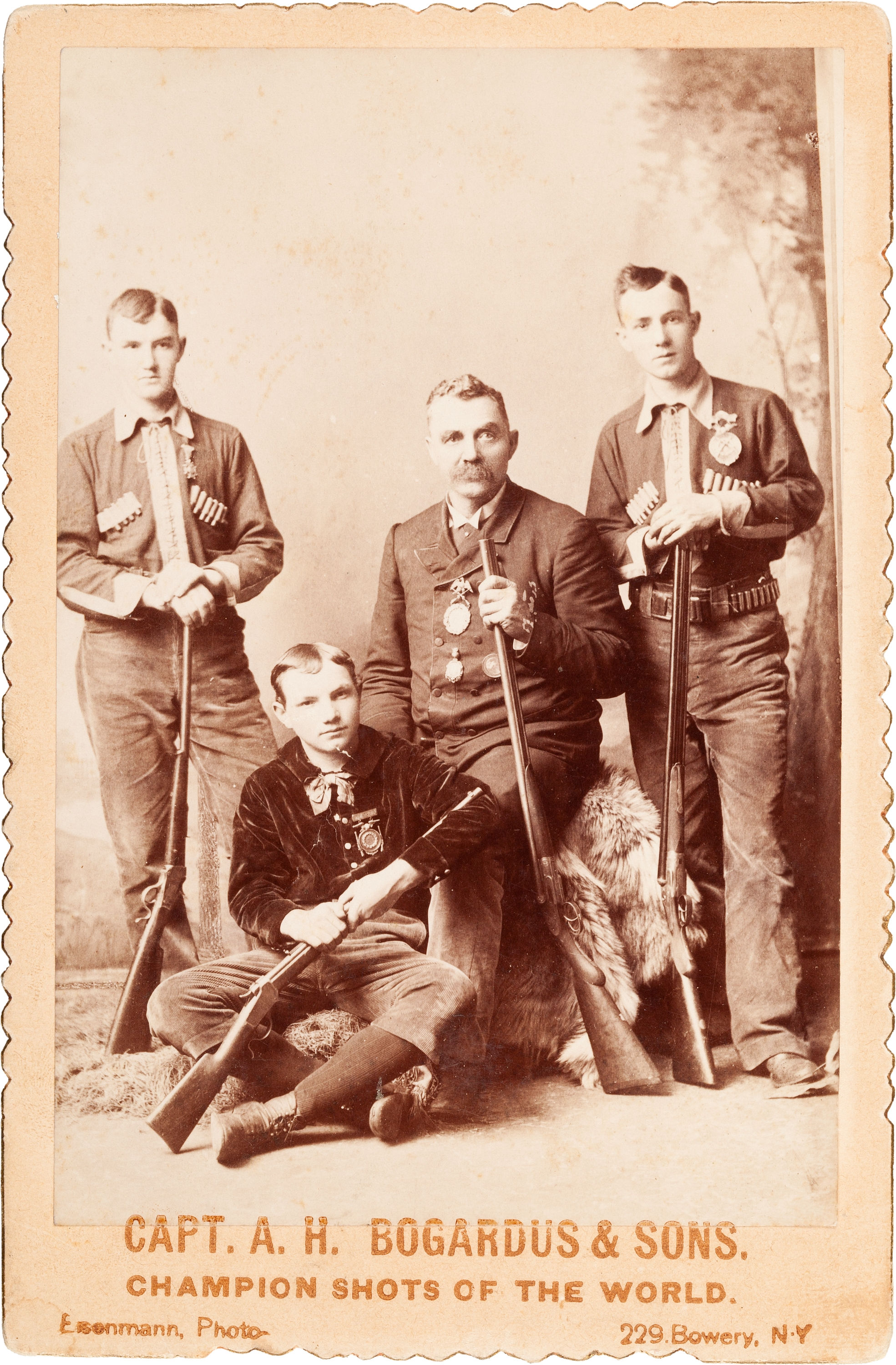
- Born: September 17, 1834; Berne, New York
- Died: March 28, 1913 (aged 78); Elkhart, Illinois
- Occupations: trap shooter, inventor
- Spouse: Cordelia Dearstyne (m. 1854)

Captain Adam Henry Bogardus (1834–1913) was an American world and national champion trap shooter, as well as the inventor of the first practical glass ball trap.

He was born in Berne, New York. There, in 1854, he married Cordelia Dearstyne. They moved to Elkhart, Illinois, where he became the wing shot champion of the world. He is credited with romanticizing trap shooting.

Trap shooting with live pigeons began in the U.S. around 1825, with the first recorded match balls containing feathers, then clay targets. Bogardus invented the first practical glass ball trap in 1877. Glass spheres, filled with feathers, were used as targets, much as clay pigeons are used today. They were called Bogardus balls. One feature of them was ridges which helped ensure that pellets would shatter the sphere, rather than glancing off.

In 1883 William Frank Carver defeated Bogardus 19 times in a series of 25 matches.

Bogardus and his sons went on to tour with Buffalo Bill's Wild West show. Captain Bogardus remained with the show for a year.

Bogardus is in the National Trapshooting Hall of Fame. He died on March 28, 1913, in Lincoln, Illinois, and is buried in Elkhart, Illinois.
