= Edwards Trace =

The Edwards Trace was an overland trail that served the frontier region that became Central Illinois. The trail is usually described as extending from Cahokia in the south, to Peoria in the north. During the 1810s and 1820s the trace played a decisive role in the settlement of Central Illinois by Euro-Americans.

== History ==
=== Active trail ===
The Native Americans had, by 1492, developed a complex skein of roads, trails, and traces over most of North America. While most of these trails are lost to written history, the trail from Cahokia to Peoria remained in active use during the late 1600s and early 1700s, the time of intensive activity by French-speaking missionaries. Bearers of the Catholic faith won some converts among the Natives of the Illinois Confederation, and Cahokia and Peoria were the sites of two large semi-urban agricultural settlements of the clans of this group. French records mention the trace from 1711 onward.

With the signing of the Treaty of Paris in 1783, the United States of America acquired nominal sovereignty over the land that would become Central Illinois. The young country was unable to exercise effective control over the frontier territory until the War of 1812, when many Native American tribes of the Illinois Territory, hoping to maintain their culture and way of life, allied themselves with the fur traders of British Upper Canada. The frontiersmen of the so-called American Bottom, grouped around Cahokia, saw this alliance as a threat and determined upon action. A local leader, territorial governor Ninian Edwards, recruited 350 frontiersmen into a troop of Illinois Rangers. Striking northward from the American Bottom on the Trace, the rangers penetrated into what was then territory occupied by the Kickapoo people, winning military control over the Sangamon River and the region around Peoria. Edwards became a hero to his fellow frontiersmen and, when Illinois achieved statehood in 1818, the ranger leader was promptly elected to the U.S. Senate. In 1826, Edwards was elected Governor of Illinois.

Following the War of 1812, Central Illinois was open to agricultural settlement and the Edwards Trace entered upon its busiest period of active use. The Trace and the prairie lands around it were carefully surveyed. In the 1820s and (to a somewhat lesser extent) in the 1830s, the trace was a primary pathway for Euro-Americans in and out of the Sangamon River Valley. Cartloads of furs, buffalo hides, and deerhides rolled southward, to be replaced by salt, gunpowder, lead ingots, iron tools, short and long guns, agricultural implements, textiles, and the other supplies required for frontier life. The freight traffic dug ruts in the Central Illinois prairie sod. As shallow-draft steamboats began to steam up and down the Illinois River, which runs parallel to the Trace, use of the Trace began to decline.

=== Legacy ===
The Edwards Trace remained in active use into the 1840s. The Alton & Sangamon railroad was chartered in 1847 to improve transportation in and out of the belt served by the Trace, and as the new trackage was built, the old trail fell into inactivity. Parts of it appear to have continued in use as rural dirt roads for many years, but eventually the Trace almost completely disappeared.

In the 1900s, few wanted to remember the old trail. In the War of 1812, the event from which the Trace had gotten its English name, the northward thrust of Edwards's troop of Illinois rangers had been conducted with a brutality that was taken for granted by the successful frontiersmen at the time. Edwards and his men had conducted a search-and-destroy operation, destroying and burning every Native property they could find – including homes and villages led by Kickapoo who had tried to live in peace with the United States. Furthermore, almost all of the Trace had physically disappeared. Its sodded ruts had been paved over with asphalt, plowed up as loamy farmland, or buried under later engineering projects.

The original surveyors' records of the Trace survived and, supplemented by the published reminiscences of old settlers, enabled local historians to locate one remaining short section of Trace ruts in what is now Lake Park, parallel to the shore of Lake Springfield. A historical marker to celebrate the rediscovery was erected in 2002.

The Edwards Trace knit together what are now the communities of Cahokia, Edwardsville, Springfield, Elkhart, and Peoria, all within Southern and Central Illinois. Sections of Interstate 55 and Interstate 155 parallel the Trace's line today.

== See also ==
- Buffalo Trace, a southern Indiana trace with a parallel history.
