= La Hogue, Illinois =

- Unincorporated community
- Iroquois County's location in Illinois

- La Hogue's location in Iroquois County
- Coordinates: 40°45′48″N 88°05′17″W
- Country: United States
- State: Illinois
- County: Iroquois County
- Township: Douglas Township
- Elevation: 663 ft (202 m)
- ZIP code: 60938
- GNIS feature ID: 0411656

La Hogue is an unincorporated community in Douglas Township, Iroquois County, Illinois, United States.

== Geography ==
La Hogue is located at 40°45′48″N 88°05′17″W at an elevation of 663 feet.
