= Henson Robinson Zoo =

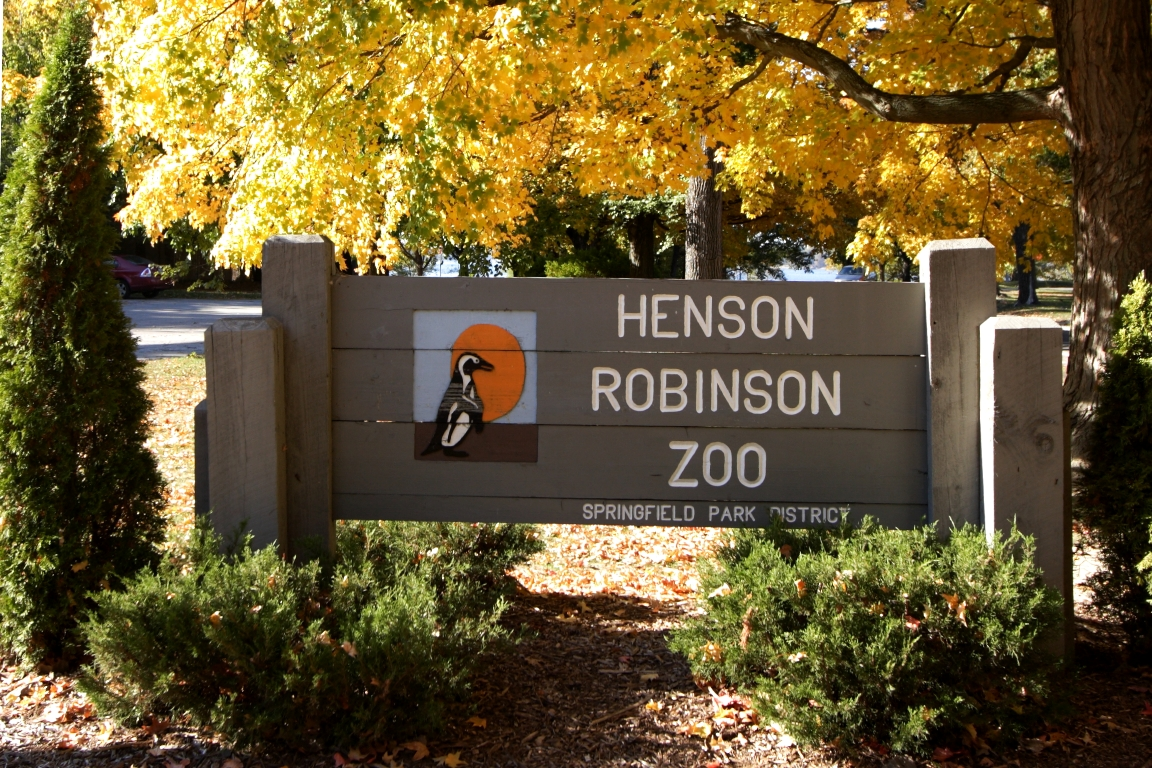
- Entrance
- Interactive map of Henson Robinson Zoo
- 39.7274°N 89.5835°W
- Location: Springfield, Illinois
- No. of animals: 300
- No. of species: 80
- Website: springfieldparks.org/facilities/hensonrobinsonzoo/

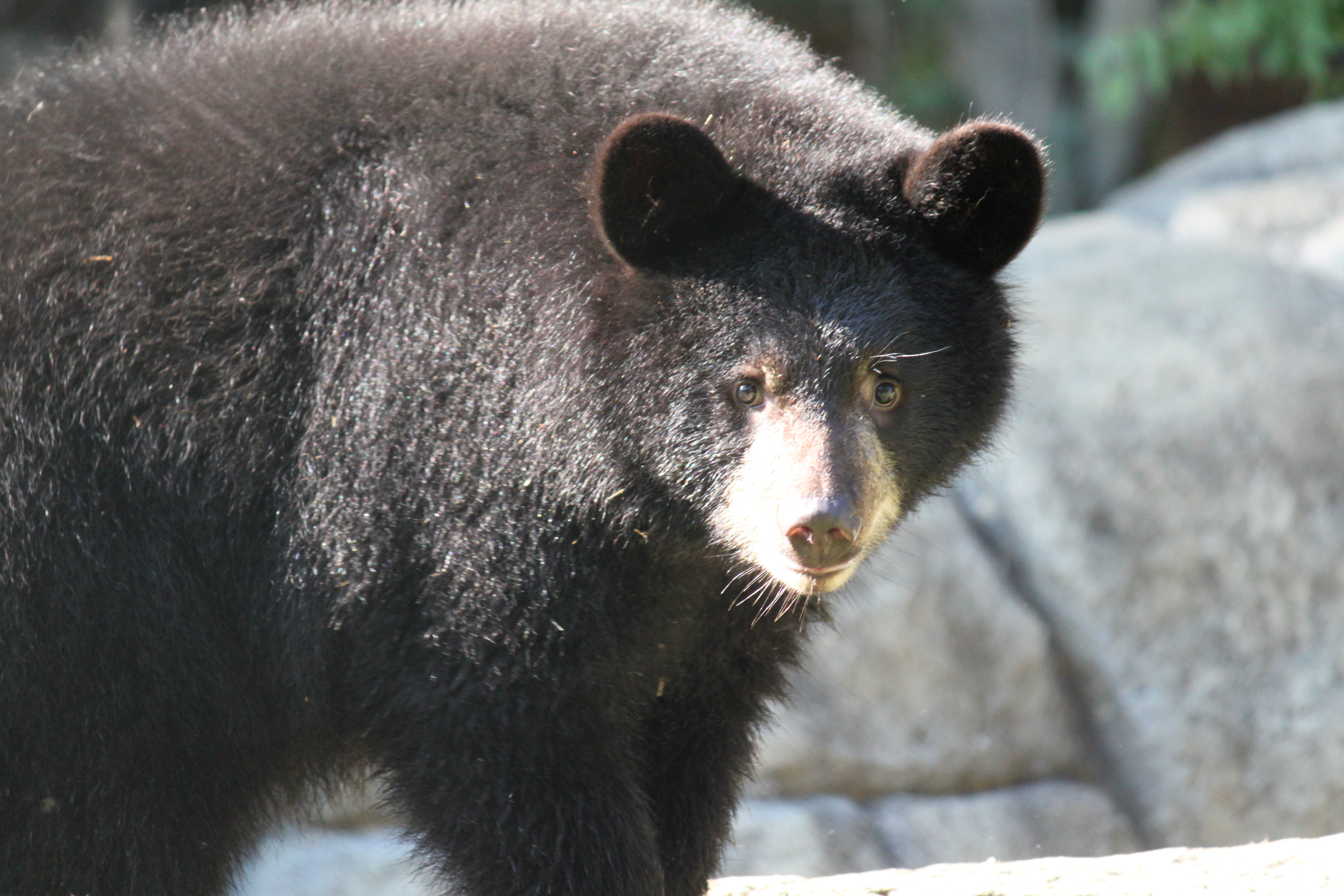
Black Bear at Henson Robinson Zoo

The Henson Robinson Zoo is a private nonprofit zoo owned and operated by the Springfield Park District. The zoo was built in 1968–1970 on the eastern shore of Lake Springfield to serve the population of Central Illinois, and opened in 1970. As of 2018, the zoo housed more than 300 animal specimens representing more than 80 species. The zoo charges an admission fee.

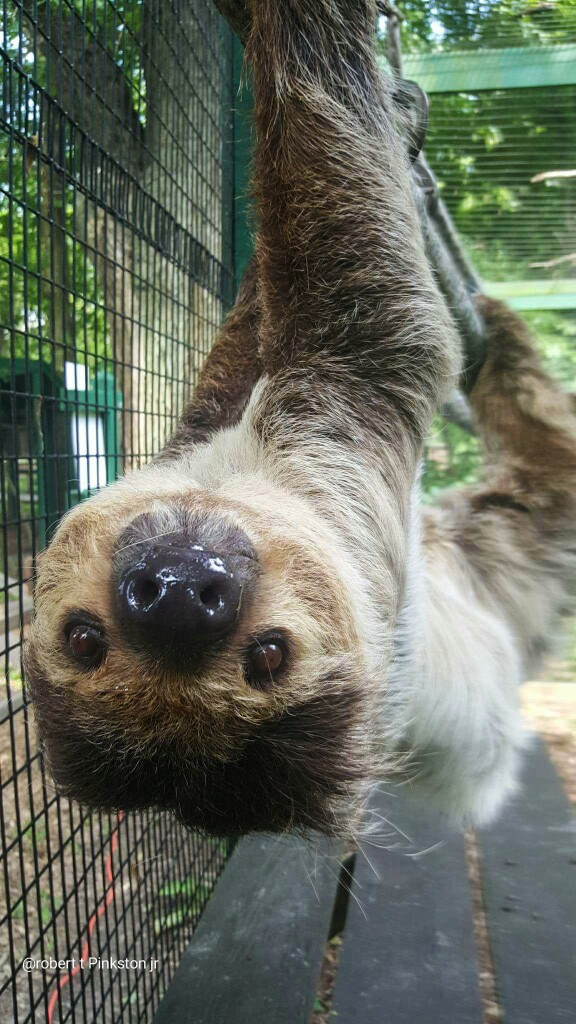
Two Toed Sloth at Henson Robinson Zoo

== History ==
The Springfield Park District's Henson Robinson Zoo began as an advocacy act by contractor Henson C. Robinson of Springfield. In 1967, the Springfield City Council set aside and donated a tract of land to the Springfield Park District. Construction of the zoo began in 1968 and on August 29, 1970, the Henson Robinson Zoo was officially opened on land owned by the Park District. Over the years, the zoo has grown and expanded with the addition of several new animals as well as exhibits. The zoo is now home to animal native to Australia, Africa, Asia and North and South America. Over 80 species of native and exotic animals are housed amongst their naturalistic exhibits.

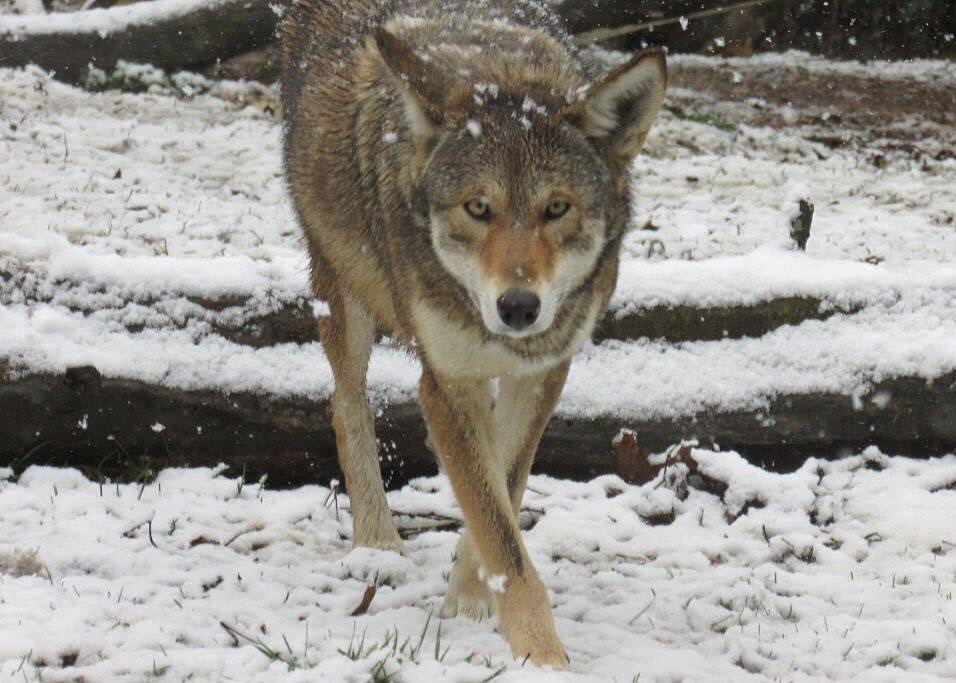
Red Wolf at Henson Robinson Zoo

== Current status ==
Since 2019, staff began rewriting the zoo's master plan. The new plan will maintain the zoo's membership in and compliance with the American Species Survival Plan, the endangered-species-oriented operating plan that governs most U.S. professional zoos. The Survival Plan urges zoos to concentrate on the creation and maintenance of socially healthy groups of geographically separated animals so that they can breed and perpetuate their genetic heritage without inbreeding.

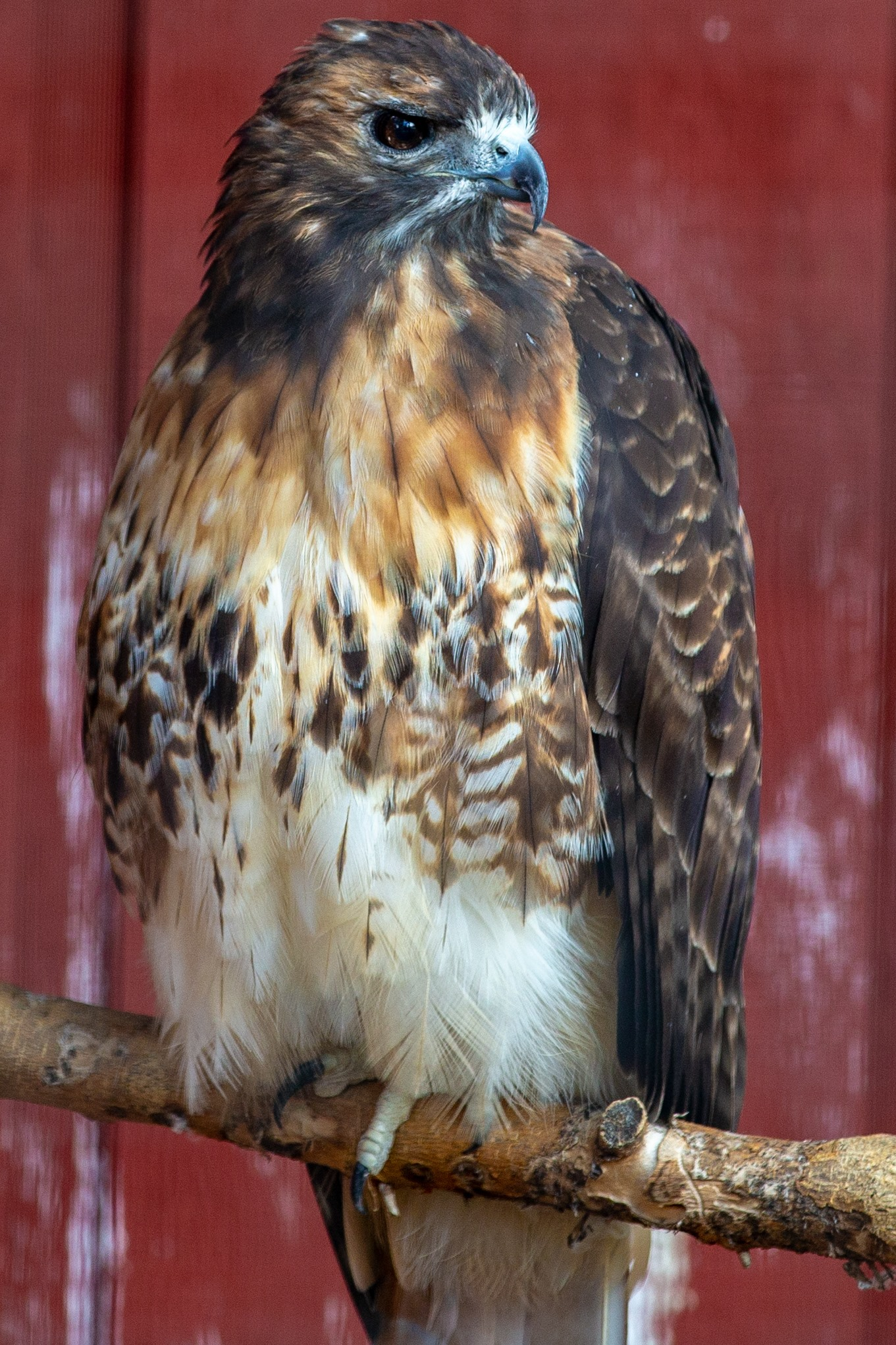
Red Tailed Hawk at Henson Robinson Zoo

== Education ==
The Zoo's 501-c-3 arm, the Springfield Zoological Society, concentrates on juvenile outreach, with a particular emphasis on social media and school-group activities and visits. The Zoo conducts frequent consultations with Springfield's School District #186 in the teaching of conservation and biology through hands-on animal experiences.

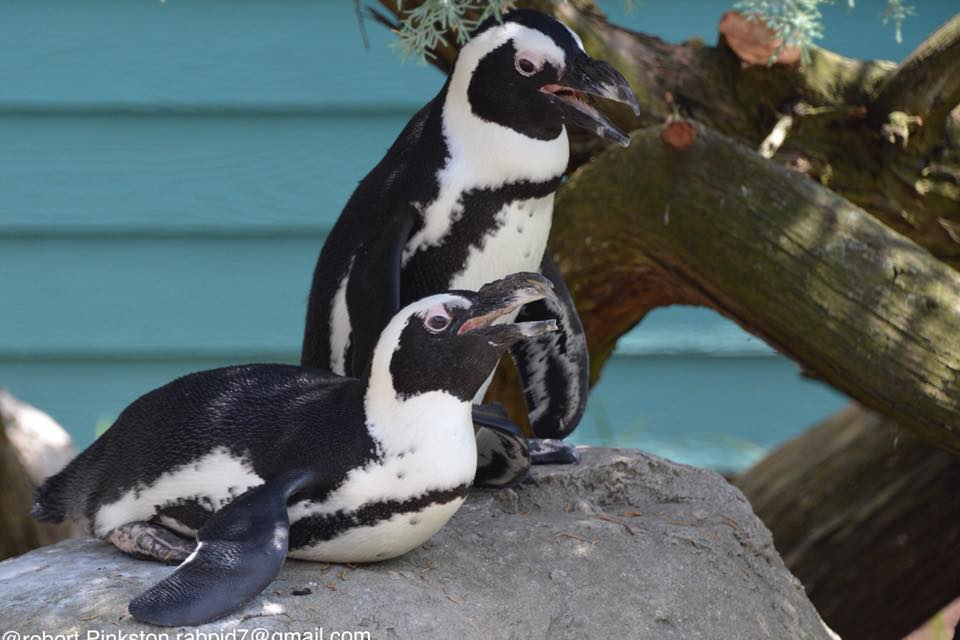
African penguin at Henson Robinson Zoo

== Events ==
- Dr. Dolittle Day

This annual spring event has an emphasis on the diverse specializations required in veterinary care. Temporary veterinary clinics provide education on everything from surgery to preventive care to radiology on site while keeper chats, farrier demonstrations, and animal encounters provide more interaction.

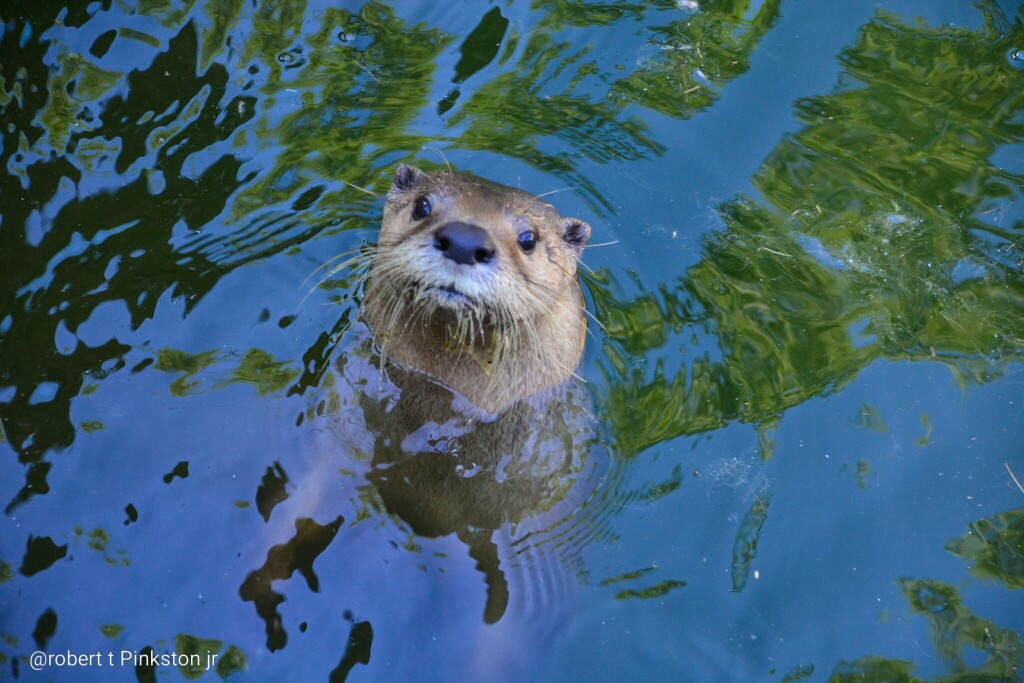
North American River Otter at Henson Robinson Zoo

- Fur Feather Fin Fall Fling

As the Zoo's ‘last blast of the season,’ the late-September Fling is focused on educating visitors on the changes animals make to prepare for cold weather.

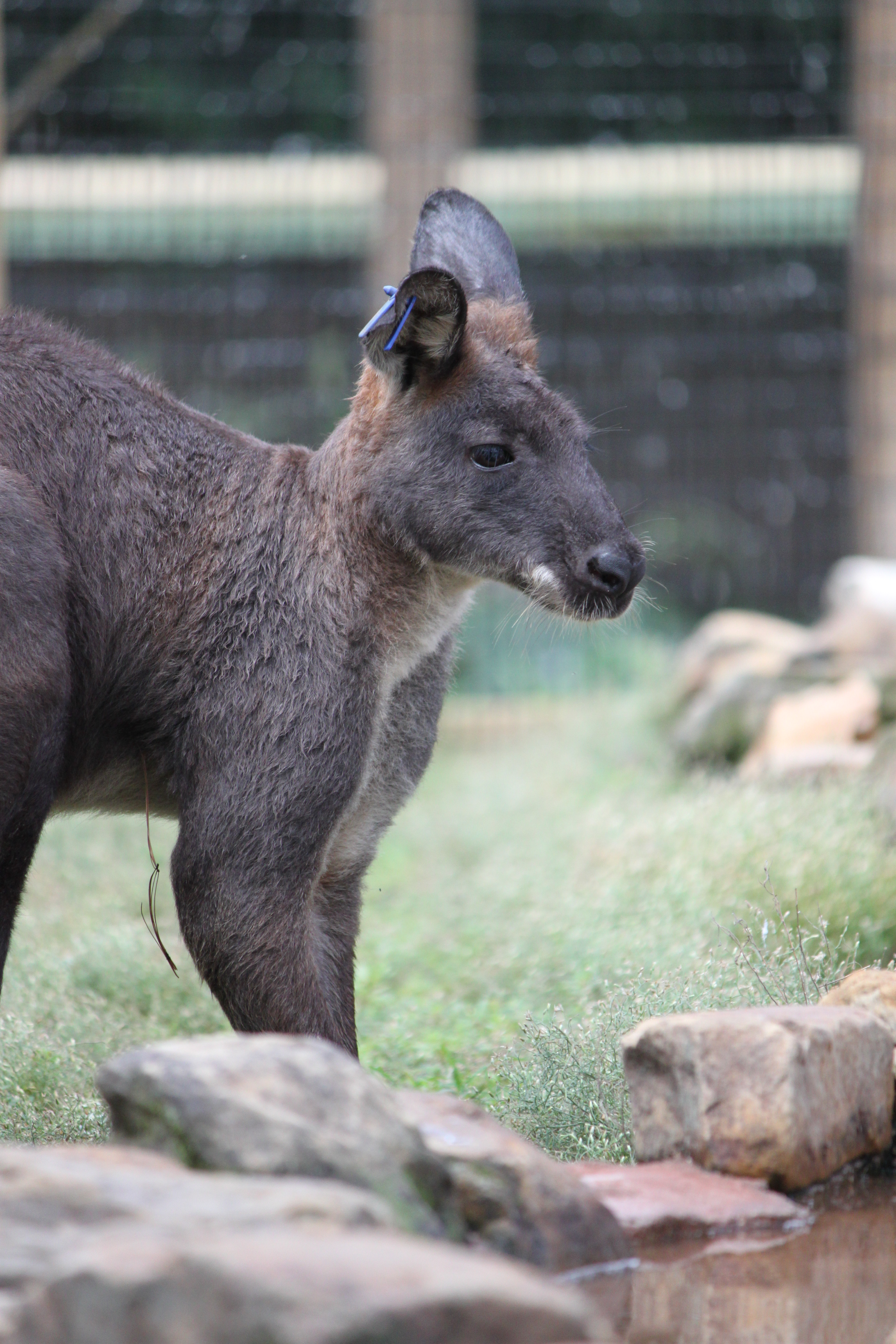
Wallaroo at Henson Robinson Zoo

- Winterland Holiday Zoo Lights

The Zoo is transformed for the holiday season with lights, food vendors, visits with Santa Claus, and photo booths.

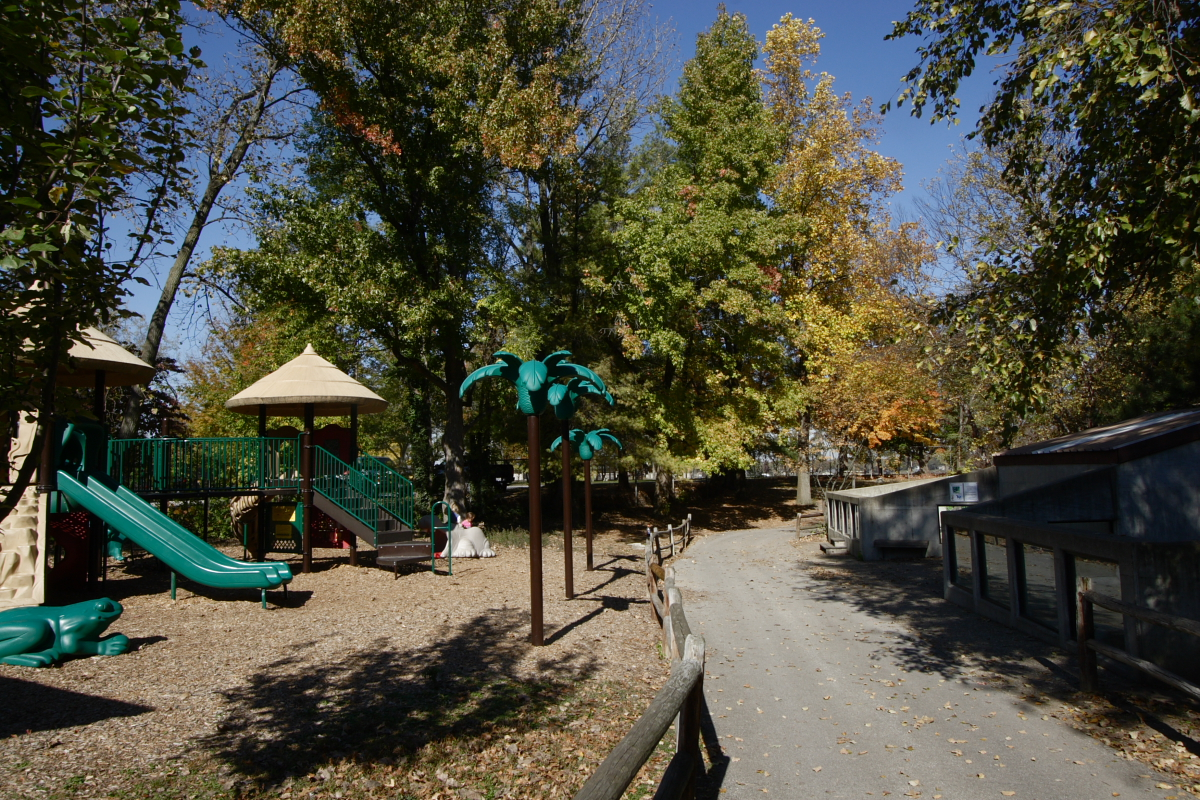
Zoo's playground
