= Elkhart, Illinois =

- Village
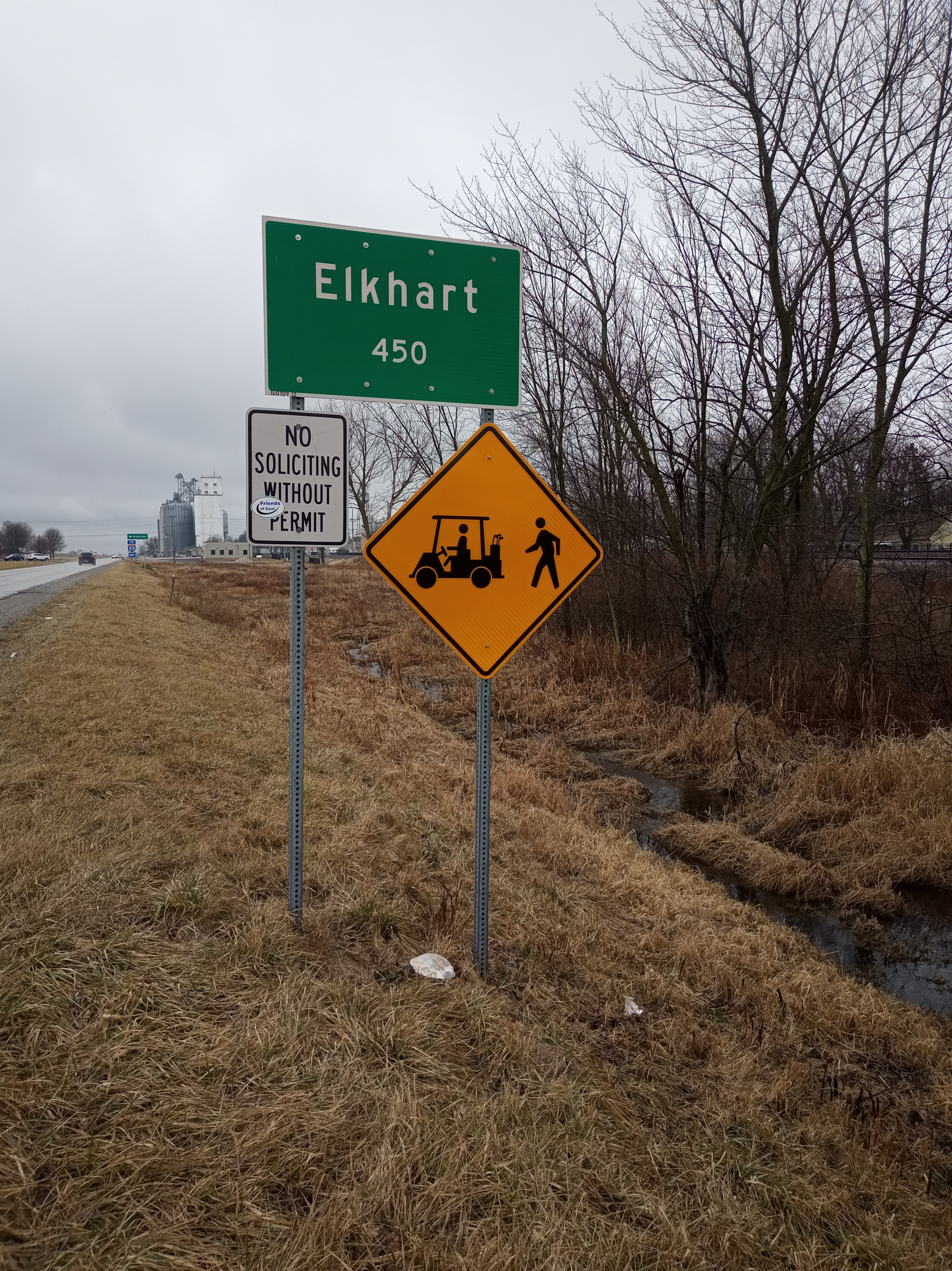
- Southern approach to Elkhart

- Location in Logan County, Illinois
- Coordinates: 40°00′49″N 89°28′22″W
- Country: United States
- State: Illinois
- County: Logan
- Townships: Elkhart, Hurlbut

Area
  - Total: 1.95 sq mi (5.05 km^{2})
  - Land: 1.94 sq mi (5.03 km^{2})
  - Water: 0.0077 sq mi (0.02 km^{2})
- Elevation: 640 ft (200 m)

Population (2020)
  - Total: 450
  - Density: 231.7/sq mi (89.46/km^{2})
- Time zone: UTC−6 (CST)
  - Summer (DST): UTC−5 (CDT)
- ZIP code: 62634
- Area code: 217
- FIPS code: 17-23269
- GNIS ID: 2398805
- Website: www.elkhartillinois.com

Elkhart is a village in Logan County, Illinois, United States. The population was 450 at the 2020 census.

== History ==
Elkhart takes its name from Elkhart (or "Elk Heart") Grove, which along with Buffalo Hart was an area of woodland along the Edwards Trace. The grove's name has been attributed to its shape, resembling the heart of an elk. Prior to the forced expulsion of indigenous peoples from Illinois, a Kickapoo village was located at the grove.

The history of non-indigenous settlement at Elkhart dates from the arrival of James Latham and his family at Elkhart Grove in the spring of 1819. James Latham's house, and later his son Richard Latham's place on the brow of the hill further south, were stops on the early stage routes from Springfield to Bloomington. Around 1822, James and Richard Latham built a horse mill at the foot of Elkhart Hill. Before this, the early settlers had been compelled to go to Edwardsville to mill. During the mill's existence, settlers came a great distance to get their grinding done and frequently camped overnight waiting their turn.

In later days, Abraham Lincoln, David Davis, John T. Stuart and others frequently spent the night at Elkhart Grove when traveling the 8th Judicial Circuit.

A town site at Elkhart Grove had been laid out by early settler Aquilla Davis in the 1820s. However, nothing definite was done in that direction until the Alton & Sangamon railroad (later the Alton Railroad) came through in 1853. Once the tracks were laid, an old horse mill, owned by Seneca Woods, was brought from Springfield by William Mozee and converted into a warehouse. This was the first building in the town of Elkhart. In 1855, John Shockey, of Franklin County, Pennsylvania, laid out the town, and County Surveyor Conaway Pence surveyed it on April 11 of that year. The town was given the name of Elkhart City to distinguish it from the nearby locations of Elkhart Hill and Elkhart Grove.

Also in 1855, John Shockey erected a large frame hotel. J. R. Saunders also built a brick store and offered the first general stock of goods for sale in the town. A few goods had been for sale in the old warehouse, but no regular stock had been kept. Quite a number of houses were built that same summer, and the town experienced quite a growth spurt during the later 1850s. The Elkhart City post office was established in 1856. J. R. Saunders served as the first postmaster and railroad agent, and William Rankin was his assistant. In 1858, John Gibbs erected a warehouse. Shockey's 16-acre (65,000 m^{2}) addition was added to the original town in January 1858. Rigney's addition was laid out in 1863, and Thompson's addition was added in 1865. A small district school house was moved into the town in 1856, which gave way to a larger structure in 1865.

For many years Elkhart was one of the largest shipping points on the Chicago & Alton Railroad. This was due in part to the large stock farms of John D. Gillett. The town was incorporated February 22, 1861, by special legislative charter. The first officers were James Rigney, president; W. M. Helm, clerk; T. H. Cantrall, treasurer; L. D. Dana, justice; Martin Buzzard, constable; and A. H. Bogardus, street commissioner. A Methodist church was built in the village in 1863, a Catholic church in 1864, and a Christian church in 1867.

The name of the post office was changed from Elkhart City to Elkhart in 1883. A new rail depot was built at Elkhart in 1888.

Like many frontier towns, Elkhart had its share of fires. The nearby residence of the rancher John D. Gillett was destroyed by fire on February 14, 1871, although he rebuilt on the same site. On May 24, 1889, lightning struck the Crang Building, which was occupied by the Hughes & Mendenhall General Store. The fire spread to adjacent buildings and destroyed most of Elkhart's commercial buildings, wiping out ten businesses and one home.On March 2, 1891, Governor Richard J. Oglesby's residence was consumed by fire. A new residence was erected by Gov. Oglesby but on a site further to the south and east, now known as Oglehurst. Gov. Oglesby died in this home on April 24, 1899.

In 1885, the town was incorporated as a village under the general laws of the state, relinquishing the special legislative charter. The first board under the new incorporation consisted of Henry Stahl, C. P. Bridges, A. H. Bogardus, C. B. Taylor, David Lippott and Luther Wood. A new library building was erected in 1904, the gift of the Gillett family.

Elkhart was a station on the Illinois Traction System, an interurban railroad providing passenger service between Peoria and St. Louis that was built through the village in 1904. It continued in service until the 1950s.

== Geography ==
Elkhart is located in southwestern Logan County is in Elkhart and Hurlbut townships, with the geographic center of the village slightly east of the township border, in Elkhart Township.

Interstate 55 passes through the northwest part of the village, with access from Exit 115. I-55 leads northeast 11 miles (18 km) to Lincoln, the county seat, and southwest 20 miles (32 km) to Springfield, the state capital.

According to the 2021 census gazetteer files, Elkhart has a total area of 1.95 square miles (5.05 km^{2}), of which 1.94 square miles (5.02 km^{2}) (or 99.54%) is land and 0.01 square miles (0.03 km^{2}) (or 0.46%) is water. Elkhart Hill, with a summit elevation of 771 feet (235 m), is in the southeast part of the village, rising 180 feet (55 m) above the village center and the surrounding flatlands.

== Demographics ==
Historical population
Census	Pop.	Note	%±
1860	118		—
1870	378		220.3%
1880	393		4.0%
1890	414		5.3%
1900	553		33.6%
1910	418		−24.4%
1920	457		9.3%
1930	448		−2.0%
1940	436		−2.7%
1950	420		−3.7%
1960	418		−0.5%
1970	435		4.1%
1980	493		13.3%
1990	475		−3.7%
2000	443		−6.7%
2010	405		−8.6%
2020	450		11.1%
U.S. Decennial Census

As of the 2020 census there were 450 people, 195 households, and 122 families residing in the village. The population density was 230.65 inhabitants per square mile (89.05/km^{2}). There were 203 housing units at an average density of 104.05 per square mile (40.17/km^{2}). The racial makeup of the village was 94.67% White, 0.89% African American, 0.00% Native American, 0.67% Asian, 0.00% Pacific Islander, 0.22% from other races, and 3.56% from two or more races. Hispanic or Latino of any race were 1.56% of the population.

There were 195 households, out of which 33.8% had children under the age of 18 living with them, 55.38% were married couples living together, 5.13% had a female householder with no husband present, and 37.44% were non-families. 34.36% of all households were made up of individuals, and 18.46% had someone living alone who was 65 years of age or older. The average household size was 3.05 and the average family size was 2.35.

The village's age distribution consisted of 27.0% under the age of 18, 4.6% from 18 to 24, 20.6% from 25 to 44, 27.7% from 45 to 64, and 20.0% who were 65 years of age or older. The median age was 42.9 years. For every 100 females, there were 84.3 males. For every 100 females age 18 and over, there were 77.2 males.

The median income for a household in the village was $69,219, and the median income for a family was $84,375. Males had a median income of $52,125 versus $40,417 for females. The per capita income for the village was $31,667. About 2.5% of families and 2.4% of the population were below the poverty line, including 0.0% of those under age 18 and 4.3% of those age 65 or over.

== Education ==
It is in the Mount Pulaski Community Unit School District 23.

== Notable people ==
- Adam Bogardus, 19th-century world champion trap shooter; lived in Elkhart
- Richard J. Oglesby, 19th-century governor of Illinois; lived and died in Elkhart
- Jake Stahl, first baseman and manager for three teams; born in Elkhart
- Tommy Thompson, outfielder for three teams; born in Elkhart

== Works cited ==
- Mazrim, Robert (2008). The Sangamo Frontier: History and Archaeology in the Shadow of Lincoln. University of Chicago Press. ISBN 9780226514239.
- Stringer, Lawrence Beaumont (1911). History of Logan County, Illinois: A Record of Its Settlement, Organization, Progress and Achievement, Volume 1. Pioneer Publishing Company. ISBN 9780608357959.
