= Gilman, Illinois =

- City
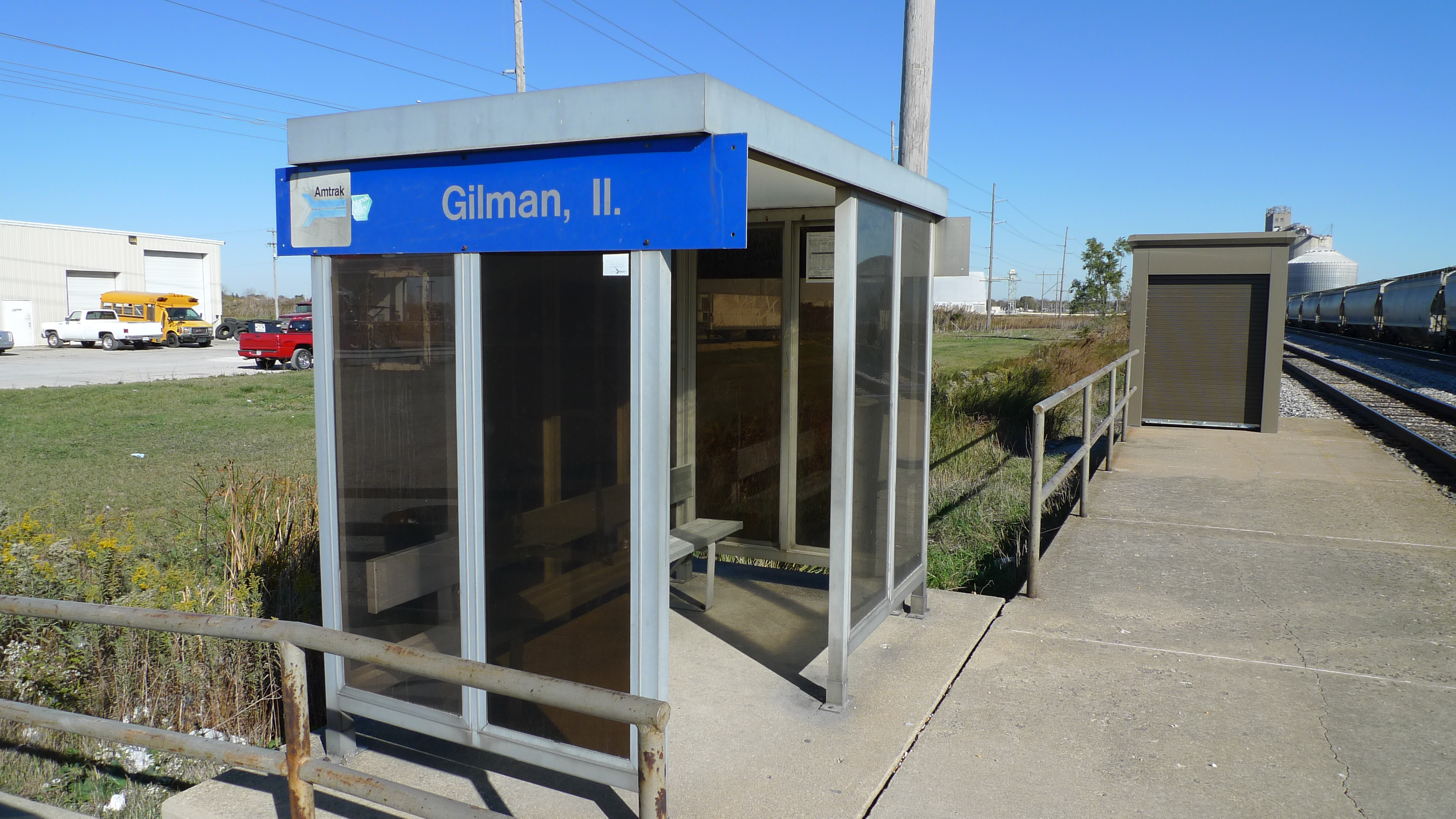
- Amtrak station in Gilman

- Location of Gilman in Iroquois County, Illinois
- Coordinates: 40°45′25″N 88°00′15″W
- Country: United States
- State: Illinois
- County: Iroquois
- Township: Douglas

Area
  - Total: 2.45 sq mi (6.35 km^{2})
  - Land: 2.43 sq mi (6.30 km^{2})
  - Water: 0.019 sq mi (0.05 km^{2})
- Elevation: 646 ft (197 m)

Population (2020)
  - Total: 1,738
  - Density: 714.2/sq mi (275.77/km^{2})
- Time zone: UTC-6 (CST)
  - Summer (DST): UTC-5 (CDT)
- ZIP code: 60938
- Area codes: 815, 779
- FIPS code: 17-29275
- GNIS feature ID: 2394898
- Website: cityofgilman.com

Gilman is a city in Douglas Township, Iroquois County, Illinois, United States. The population was 1,738 at the 2020 census.

== History ==
=== Founding of Gilman ===
Gilman was laid out in the fall of 1857 on land belonging to E.D. Hundley, Judge John Chamberlain (24 October 1803 – 16 December 1866), and three Methodist ministers: Walter C. Palmer, Joseph Hartwell, and John Dempster. Hundley, who was from Virginia, left Illinois for the South at the outbreak of the Civil War. The three ministers, who had been given their land by Mr. Cassady of Danville, played no further role in the development of the town.

Judge Chamberlain was the man most responsible for the early growth of Gilman. He was born in Charlestown, New Hampshire, the son of a lawyer. Chamberlain had served in the New York Legislature and had moved to Iroquois County in 1853. He was elected judge, was active in county politics, and lived in Watseka, Illinois. Chamberlain took as a partner Joseph Thomas ( ? -1858) from nearby Onarga.

The town of Gilman was founded at the point where the Peoria and Oquawka Railroad would soon cross the Illinois Central Railroad. The Peoria and Oquawka became the Toledo, Peoria and Western Railway. In return for establishing a station at Gilman, Octave Chanute, the chief engineer of the Peoria and Oquawka Railroad, asked for and was given one half of all the lots in the original town of Gilman. This was standard practice for the railroad and was done at El Paso, Fairbury and probably other new towns established along the route of the railroad. Town founders were aware that the lots were not personally for Chanute, but for the railroad company; Today Chanute is best known for his publications on aviation and for his assistance to the Wright brothers. Chanute was involved in the foundation of many towns along the railroad, usually in association with local individuals. Railroad companies in Illinois were forbidden to found towns themselves.

Iroquois Democrats had wanted to name the town "Douglas", after the Illinois senator, but Cruger Secor and Company had been given the right to name the town and they decided to honor Samuel Gilman, a director of that company.

=== Original design of Gilman ===
The design of Gilman in general followed the standard plan used by the Peoria and Oquawka Railroad. This was based on a Depot Ground, a wider area of railroad-owned land where the tracks pass through a town. In the original town of Gilman, east–west streets were given numbers, 6th to 2nd with Front Street where 1st Street would have been expected. The north–south streets, often given standard tree names in other Peoria and Oquawka towns, were here assigned distinctive local names including Chamberlain, Thomas and Douglas. Except for a slight bend in Central and Chamberlain streets, the plan is generally similar to that of Chatsworth, Fairbury, Gridley and Watseka (platted as "South Middleport"). The Gilman plat was exceptionally large with 73 blocks, most having sixteen lots. Unlike most towns of the era, Gilman never developed a single commercial focus. This was evident early in its history when Beckwith remarked, "The town is the most diffusely settled, probably, of any of like population in the state. It would be very difficult to tell which is the center of the town."

=== Early Gilman ===
The first new inhabitant of the area was W. P. Gardner from Pennsylvania, who at first lived in a shanty maintained by the railroad for its workers. When the survey of Gilman was done in September 1857, Gardner built the first house in Gilman. That same fall James Wright built a house in Gilman. This was soon followed by a much more expensive structure, a three-story hotel costing $4,000 with a third-floor assembly area. The first recorded event in Gilman's history was a ball held on 22 February 1858 at the hotel to celebrate George Washington's birthday. Some of the less respectable young men of the neighborhood objected to the ladies being inside the hotel while they were left out on the frigid street. They began calling for the ladies to come outside and join them. One of those invited guests was the builder of the hotel, a man named Lawrence. Wise in the ways of frontier towns, Lawrence had taken the precaution of bringing a stout stick to the dance. Rushing downstairs he burst out the door swinging his shillelagh and quickly dispersing the rowdies. The ball went on.

D. Harwood was the first merchant to open a store in Gilman which maintained a full stock of goods. The first train through Gilman arrived on 21 September 1857 and was to take local people to the State Fair in Peoria. It was three hours late, but its arrival signaled the start of a period of rapid growth for the new town. The Illinois Central did not begin to run trains until 1858. In 1860 the first school was built; by 1865, the town had 31 buildings. Gilman was officially organized as a town in 1867.

=== Continued growth ===
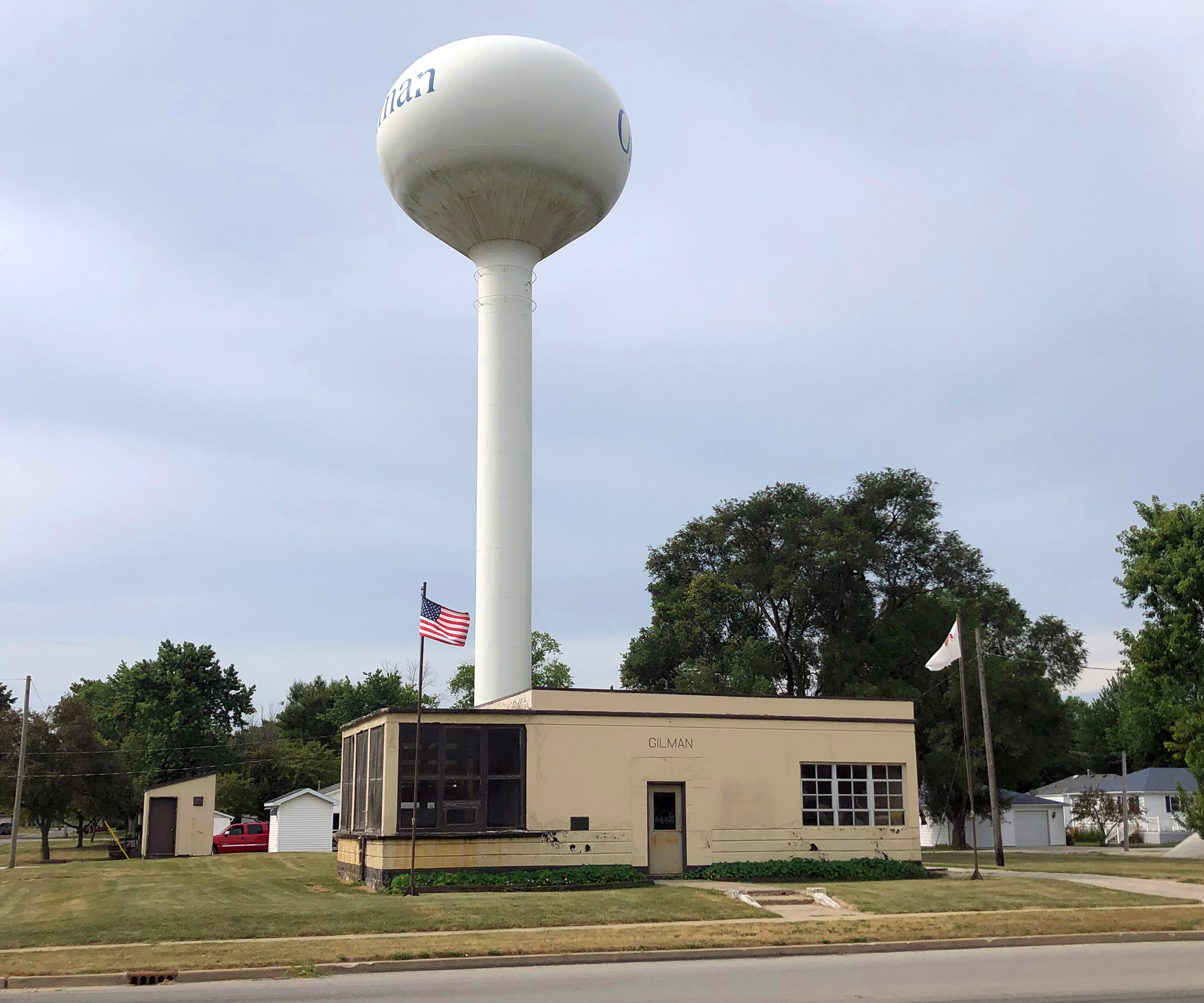
The town hall and water tower.

By the late 1860s, Gilman had two railroads. The eastern branch of the Illinois Central linked St. Louis and Chicago, while the Toledo Peoria and Western ran east and west across the state, from the Mississippi River to Indiana. Gilman prospered as the place where people and goods were transferred from one railroad to the other. In 1870 newspaper, the Gilman Star began publication. The 1870 federal census found Gilman had 761 people. In September 1871, a third railroad, originally called the Gilman, Clinton and Springfield Railroad, opened for business. It was largely funded by local bonds and never enjoyed the success of the earlier railroads. On 5 July 1883 a severe fire damaged much of the town. An electric power plant was built in 1898.

Unlike many local towns, Gilman continued to grow in the twentieth century. In 1920, there were 1,443 people. In 1923 and 1924, the state of Illinois began building a new "hard road" paralleling the Toledo Peoria and Western Railroad, which was at first called the Corn Belt Trail, but soon became U.S. Route 24. A second new road, paralleling the Illinois Central Railroad through Iroquois County, initially known as the Egyptian Trail, evolved into Interstate 57 in the 1970s. In the last decade, a second water tower was built along Interstate 57 on the western side of Gilman.

== Geography ==
Map of Gilman

Gilman is located in the western part of the county at the intersection of three major highways: Interstate 57, U.S. Route 24, and U.S. Route 45. As a result, it has been named "The City of the Crossroads". Amtrak, the national passenger rail service, provides service at the Gilman station. Gilman is 13 miles (21 km) west of Watseka, the Iroqouis county seat; 39 miles (63 km) east of Chenoa and Interstate 55; 49 miles (79 km) north of Champaign; and 87 miles (140 km) south of Chicago.

According to the 2021 census gazetteer files, Gilman has a total area of 2.45 square miles (6.35 km^{2}), of which 2.43 square miles (6.29 km^{2}) (or 99.18%) is land and 0.02 square miles (0.05 km^{2}) (or 0.82%) is water.

== Demographics ==
Historical population
Census	Pop.	Note	%±
1880	1,299		—
1890	1,112		−14.4%
1900	1,441		29.6%
1910	1,305		−9.4%
1920	1,448		11.0%
1930	1,620		11.9%
1940	1,554		−4.1%
1950	1,602		3.1%
1960	1,704		6.4%
1970	1,786		4.8%
1980	1,913		7.1%
1990	1,816		−5.1%
2000	1,793		−1.3%
2010	1,814		1.2%
2020	1,738		−4.2%
U.S. Decennial Census

=== 2020 census ===
As of the 2020 census, Gilman had a population of 1,738, with 698 households and 448 families residing in the city. The median age was 42.3 years. 25.1% of residents were under the age of 18 and 22.8% were 65 years of age or older. For every 100 females there were 94.8 males, and for every 100 females age 18 and over there were 88.4 males age 18 and over.

0.0% of residents lived in urban areas, while 100.0% lived in rural areas.

Of households in Gilman, 32.1% had children under the age of 18 living in them. Of all households, 44.4% were married-couple households, 18.8% were households with a male householder and no spouse or partner present, and 28.7% were households with a female householder and no spouse or partner present. About 30.2% of all households were made up of individuals and 15.7% had someone living alone who was 65 years of age or older.

The population density was 708.52 inhabitants per square mile (273.56/km^{2}). There were 770 housing units at an average density of 313.90 per square mile (121.20/km^{2}), of which 9.4% were vacant. The homeowner vacancy rate was 0.8% and the rental vacancy rate was 11.9%.

Racial composition as of the 2020 census
Race	Number	Percent
White	1,409	81.1%
Black or African American	6	0.3%
American Indian and Alaska Native	14	0.8%
Asian	5	0.3%
Native Hawaiian and Other Pacific Islander	0	0.0%
Some other race	176	10.1%
Two or more races	128	7.4%
Hispanic or Latino (of any race)	352	20.3%

=== Income and poverty ===
The median income for a household in the city was $56,719, and the median income for a family was $69,333. Males had a median income of $51,016 versus $24,702 for females. The per capita income for the city was $26,015. About 6.7% of families and 10.9% of the population were below the poverty line, including 10.5% of those under age 18 and 7.9% of those age 65 or over.

== Media ==
The Gilman Star was a weekly newspaper established in 1869 with general circulation in Western Iroquois County. It published its final paper on July 31, 2024, citing a decline in subscriptions and advertisers as reasons for its closure.

== Notable people ==
- Frank Griffith, pitcher for the Chicago Colts and Cleveland Spiders
- Harry W. Starr, Illinois state senator
- Franklin Underwood, songwriter and jazz pianist
