= Loami, Illinois =

Loami
- Village
- Location of Loami in Sangamon County, Illinois.
- Coordinates: 39°40′29″N 89°50′50″W
- Country: United States
- State: Illinois
- County: Sangamon
- Incorporated: July 29, 1875

Area
  - Total: 1.02 sq mi (2.63 km^{2})
  - Land: 1.01 sq mi (2.62 km^{2})
  - Water: 0.0039 sq mi (0.01 km^{2})
- Elevation: 633 ft (193 m)

Population (2020)
  - Total: 812
  - Density: 802.6/sq mi (309.89/km^{2})
- Time zone: UTC-6 (CST)
  - Summer (DST): UTC-5 (CDT)
- ZIP code: 62661
- Area code: 217
- FIPS code: 17-44173
- GNIS feature ID: 2398459
- Website: loamiil.com

Loami is a village in Sangamon County, Illinois, United States. As of the 2020 census, Loami had a population of 812. It is part of the Springfield, Illinois Metropolitan Statistical Area. It is adjacent to the Nipper Wildlife Sanctuary, a parcel of tallgrass prairie replanted on the loam soil after which the village is named. The village was incorporated July 29, 1875.

== Geography ==
According to the 2010 census, Loami has a total area of 1.054 square miles (2.73 km^{2}), of which 1.05 square miles (2.72 km^{2}) (or 99.62%) is land and 0.004 square miles (0.01 km^{2}) (or 0.38%) is water.

== Demographics ==
Historical population
Census	Pop.	Note	%±
1880	306		—
1890	383		25.2%
1900	481		25.6%
1910	530		10.2%
1920	462		−12.8%
1930	462		0.0%
1940	488		5.6%
1950	439		−10.0%
1960	450		2.5%
1970	537		19.3%
1980	770		43.4%
1990	802		4.2%
2000	804		0.2%
2010	745		−7.3%
2020	812		9.0%
U.S. Decennial Census

As of the census of 2000, there were 804 people, 300 households, and 231 families residing in the village. The population density was 822.5 inhabitants per square mile (317.6/km^{2}). There were 321 housing units at an average density of 328.4 per square mile (126.8/km^{2}). The racial makeup of the village was 97.51% White, 0.50% African American, 0.25% Native American, 0.50% Asian, 0.75% Pacific Islander, and 0.50% from two or more races. Hispanic or Latino of any race were 1.87% of the population.

There were 300 households, out of which 40.7% had children under the age of 18 living with them, 58.0% were married couples living together, 12.3% had a female householder with no husband present, and 22.7% were non-families. 19.0% of all households were made up of individuals, and 9.3% had someone living alone who was 65 years of age or older. The average household size was 2.68 and the average family size was 2.99.

In the village, the population was spread out, with 28.7% under the age of 18, 8.7% from 18 to 24, 32.0% from 25 to 44, 21.5% from 45 to 64, and 9.1% who were 65 years of age or older. The median age was 35 years. For every 100 females, there were 93.3 males. For every 100 females age 18 and over, there were 92.3 males.

The median income for a household in the village was $46,591, and the median income for a family was $48,200. Males had a median income of $35,795 versus $27,125 for females. The per capita income for the village was $17,661. About 5.7% of families and 10.0% of the population were below the poverty line, including 8.0% of those under age 18 and 6.3% of those age 65 or over.
