= Lake Springfield =

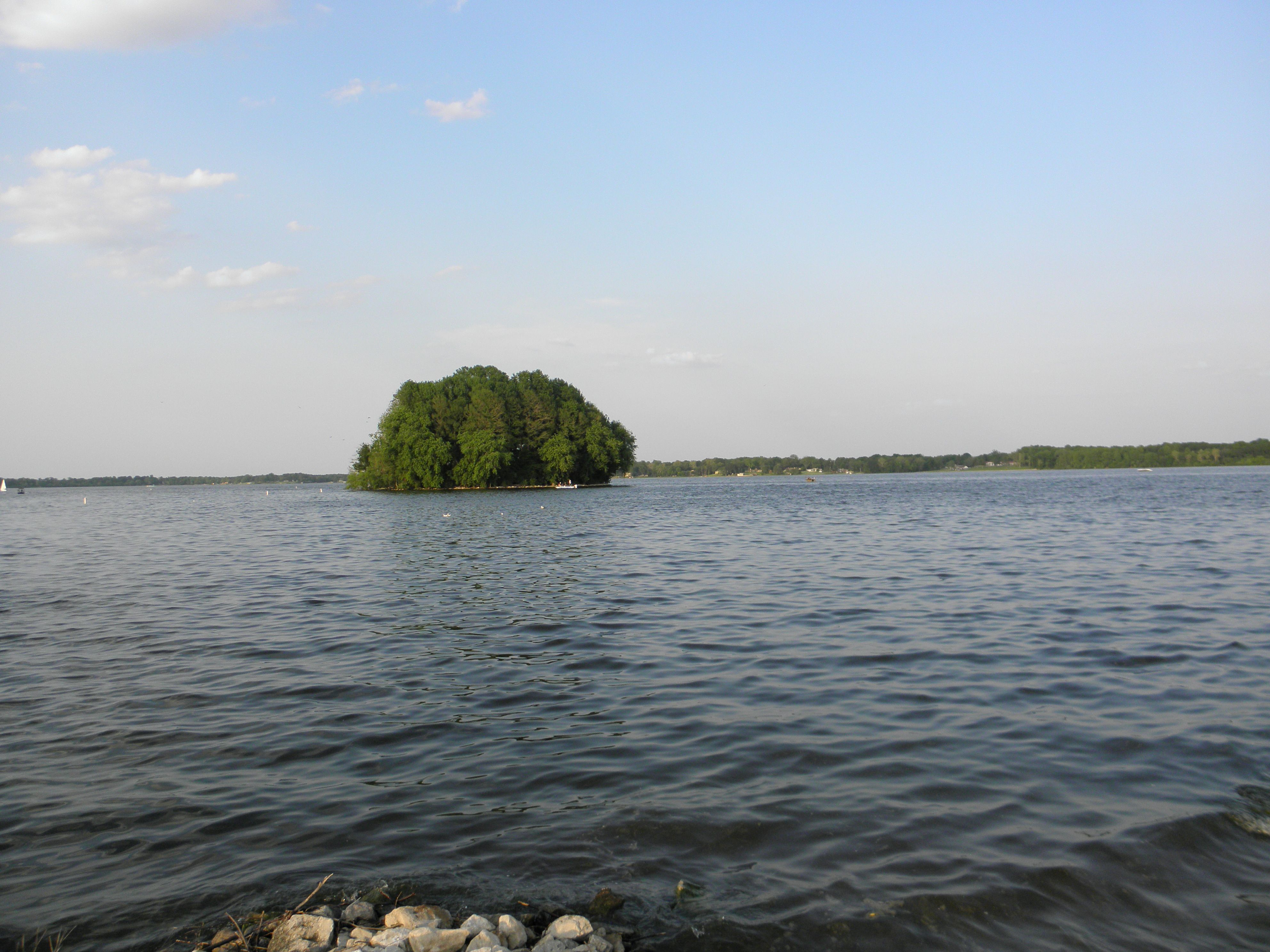
- Bay Island on Island Bay in Lake Springfield

- Location within Illinois Location within the United States
- Location: Springfield, Illinois
- Coordinates: 39°45′34″N 89°36′01″W
- Type: reservoir
- Primary inflows: Lick Creek, Sugar Creek
- Primary outflows: Sugar Creek
- Catchment area: 265 sq mi (690 km^{2})
- Basin countries: United States
- Surface area: 3,965 acres (16.05 km^{2})
- Max. depth: 27 feet (8.2 m)
- Water volume: 17,500,000,000 US gal (0.066 km^{3})
- Shore length^{1}: 57 mi (92 km)
- Surface elevation: 560 ft (170 m)
- Settlements: Springfield
- ^{1} Shore length is not a well-defined measure.

Lake Springfield is a 3,965-acre (16.05 km^{2}) reservoir in the southeast of the capital city of Springfield, Illinois. It is 560 ft (170 m) above sea level. The lake was formed by building Spaulding Dam across Sugar Creek, a tributary of the Sangamon River. It is the largest municipally owned body of water in Illinois. The lake and the lands adjoining it are all owned by City Water, Light & Power, the municipal utility for the city of Springfield, which operates the Dallman Power Plant at the lake's north end. Multiple city parks border its more than 50 miles (80 km) of shoreline.

The lake is crossed by several bridges, including the Interstate 55 bridge. Its principal tributaries are Sugar Creek and Lick Creek, and its waters discharge through Spaulding Dam to the lower Sugar Creek valley, which flows into the Sangamon River.

The lake was created in the 1930s as a source of water for Springfield and to provide cooling water for the City Water, Light & Power coal-fired electrical generating plant. It has also served as a focus of local recreation. High-powered motor boats and aquatic sports are allowed on much of the lake, and the lake is known for warm-water fish.

== Location ==
Lake Springfield can be seen from Interstate 55. The limited-access highway crosses the lake on two bridges between mileposts 88 and 89. The lake is accessible from exit 88 (East Lake Shore Drive), exit 90 (Toronto Road), and exit 94 (Stevenson Drive).

Lake Springfield is close to the campus of the University of Illinois Springfield. It also borders Abraham Lincoln Memorial Garden, a local arboretum, and the Henson Robinson Zoo. There are eight city parks around the lake. Lake Park, just north of the zoo, has preserved ruts of the Edwards Trace pioneer trail; a historical marker was posted near the trace in 2002.

Lake Springfield tributaries include Lick Creek and Sugar Creek. Water discharged from these watercourses into Lake Springfield fluctuates with the seasons and with changes in local precipitation, and City Water, Light & Power has asked for permission to build a buffer lake, Hunter Lake, nearby.

== History ==
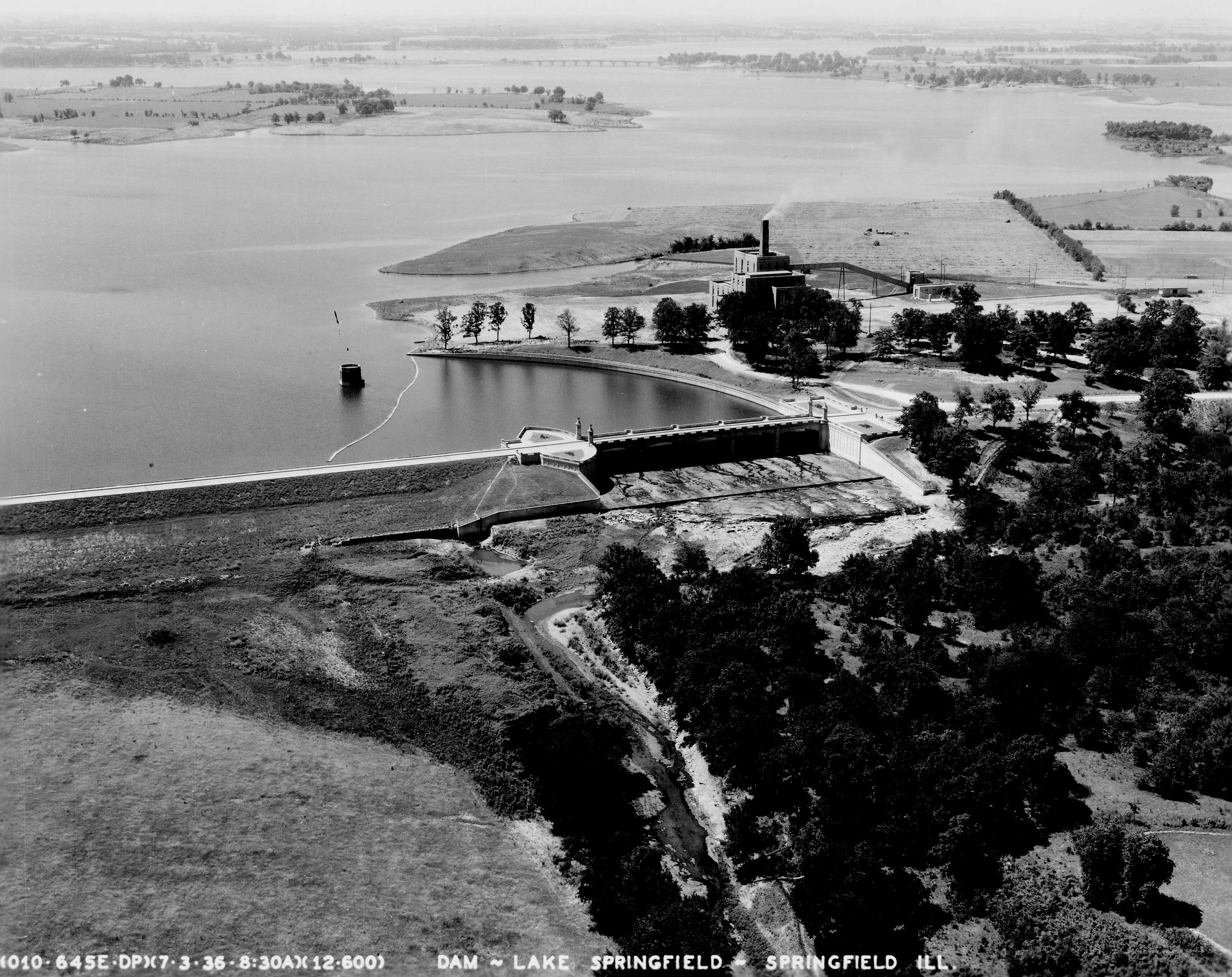
Lake Springfield, 1936

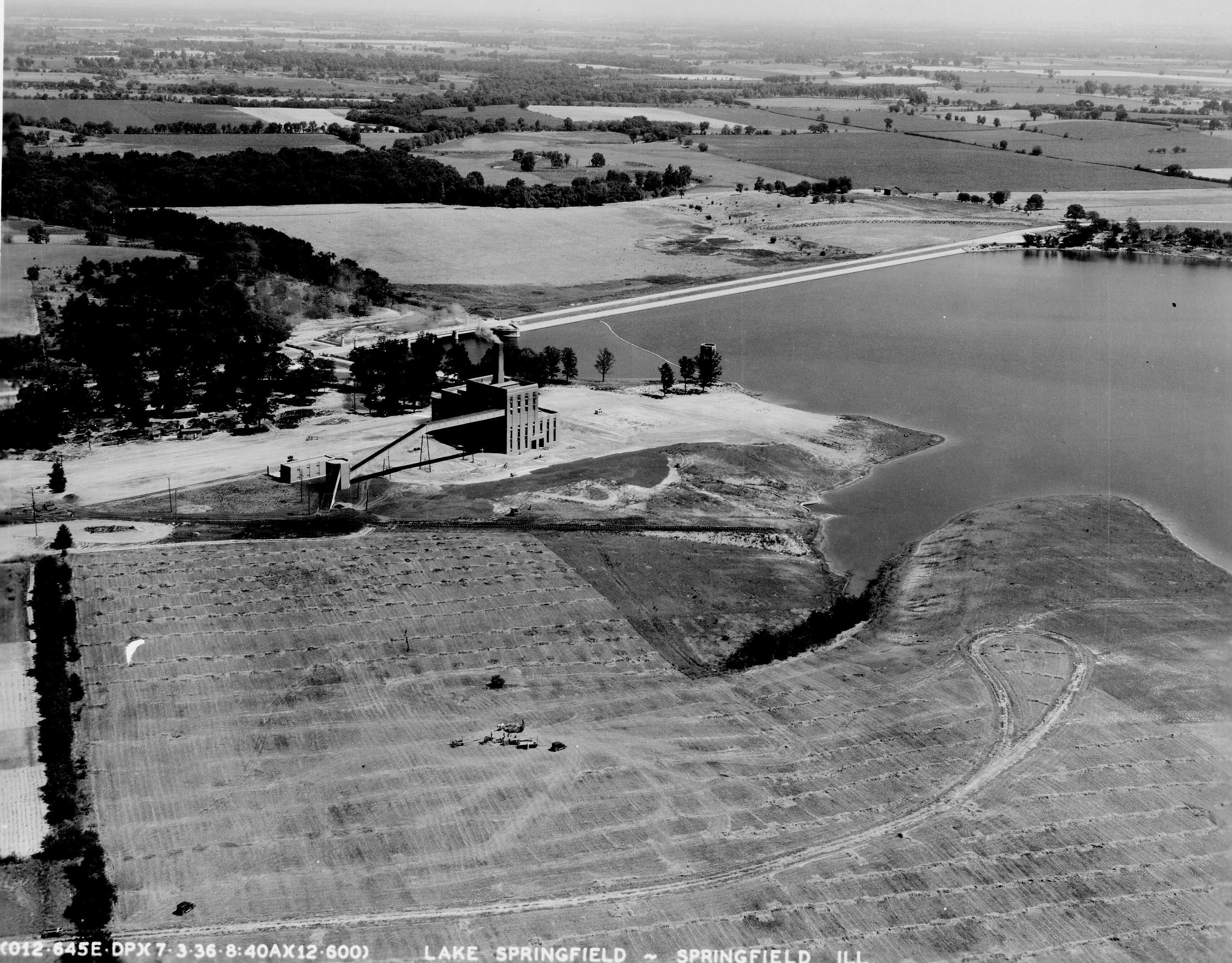
Lake Springfield, 1936

The first historically documented settlement of the valleys of Sugar and Lick Creeks, now part of Lake Springfield, took place in the 1810s. The Edwards Trace, an ancient road between Kaskaskia and Peoria, ran along the eastern side of the valley. The town of Cotton Hill took shape around a mill near the junction of the two creeks. Also known as "Crow's Mill", the town was the site of a quarry that produced the limestone for the Old State Capitol in Springfield. Route 66 passed through the valley and the town of Cotton Hill until it was rerouted to the east to the present-day alignment of Interstate 55.

Initial discussions of constructing a lake in Springfield began in 1925. Three water sources originally were considered for construction of the lake — the Sangamon River, the South Fork of the Sangamon and the Sugar Creek Valley. Engineers determined that Sugar Creek was the most economical option.

The effort to build the lake was led by longtime city Utilities Commissioner Willis J. Spaulding. Voters approved a bond referendum in 1930 to pay for part of the lake. Spaulding Dam is named after the commissioner, who oversaw Springfield's electric and water departments from 1909 until 1943. In the end, however, federal relief programs such as the Works Progress Administration paid much of the lake's $5.64 million cost. 110 properties were purchased in order to build the lake. Most of those who owned land needed for the lake were willing sellers, thanks partly to the Great Depression, but not all. Leander Shoup had to be "escorted from his land by the sheriff and ten deputies," according to a City Water, Light and Power history of the lake.

With Spaulding Dam completed and water backing up behind it, Lake Springfield reached “full pool” on May 2, 1935. Soon afterwards, water began flowing over the spillway, re-watering lower Sugar Creek and completing the dam-interrupted hydrology. Lake Springfield celebrated its 90th birthday in June 2025.

The lake has undergone both drought and flood over the past 90 years. The worst drought, which lasted from 1952 to 1955, drew the lake down more than 12 feet below full pool, reducing its water storage to 7.4 billion gallons and threatening operations of both the power plant complex and the water treatment plant. That prompted construction of an emergency connection to the South Fork to supplement the lake.

The 1950s drought also led to plans to build a second lake as a long-term backup water source. Nearly all the land for Lake II (later named Hunter Lake, after former utilities commissioner John Hunter) had been purchased by the early 21st century. However, bureaucratic hurdles and continuing public doubt about the need for the new lake left it unbuilt as of 2022.

== Fishing ==
Lake Springfield is a highly ranked fishing lake. Species that are doing well, as of 2016, include:

Species Name	Notes
Bluegill	6–8 inches is common
Channel catfish	Maximum length 27.5 in (70 cm), maximum weight 13.5 lb (6.1 kg)
Flathead catfish	Weight can reach 60 lb (27 kg)
Largemouth bass	Maximum length 22 in (56 cm), Maximum weight 6.5 lb (2.9 kg)
White bass	Length to 15 in (38 cm) is common
White crappie	Maximum length 15 in (38 cm), weight can reach 2 lb (0.91 kg)

Other fish found in the lake include blue catfish, black crappie, green sunfish, green sunfish x bluegill hybrid, freshwater drum, redear sunfish, carp, walleye, saugeye, black bullhead and yellow bullhead.

== Recreation ==
=== Boating ===
Recreational boating is popular on Lake Springfield, especially in the summer months. Some activities include skiing, wakeboarding, windsurfing, sailing, tubing, kayaking, paddle boarding. There are coves located around the lake where boaters are allowed to tie up away from the main boating areas. A private Marina located at the south end of the lake provides boat rentals, kayak rentals, a restaurant, and other various boating amenities.

=== Parks ===
There are numerous parks located around Lake Springfield. Most parks have pavilions that are available to the public, and many have docks with fishing access. Lincoln Memorial Gardens is located on the east side of the lake, and offers trails and other exhibits. The public beach closed in the 2000s and never re-opened. The historic Beach House building located on the beach is still available to rent by reservation.

=== Events ===
There are fish fries, slo-pitch softball tournaments, and other various activities that take place at the clubs located on Lake Springfield. There is an annual triathlon that takes place during the summer months. There have been boat races during various stretches since the 1980s. The last boat races on the lake were in 2019. There is a large firework show located on the south end of the lake every year around 4th of July. There is another firework show on Labor Day Weekend that happens on the north end of the lake.
