= Abraham Lincoln Memorial Garden =

Memorial garden in Illinois, United States

- Lincoln, Abraham, Memorial Garden
- U.S. National Register of Historic Places
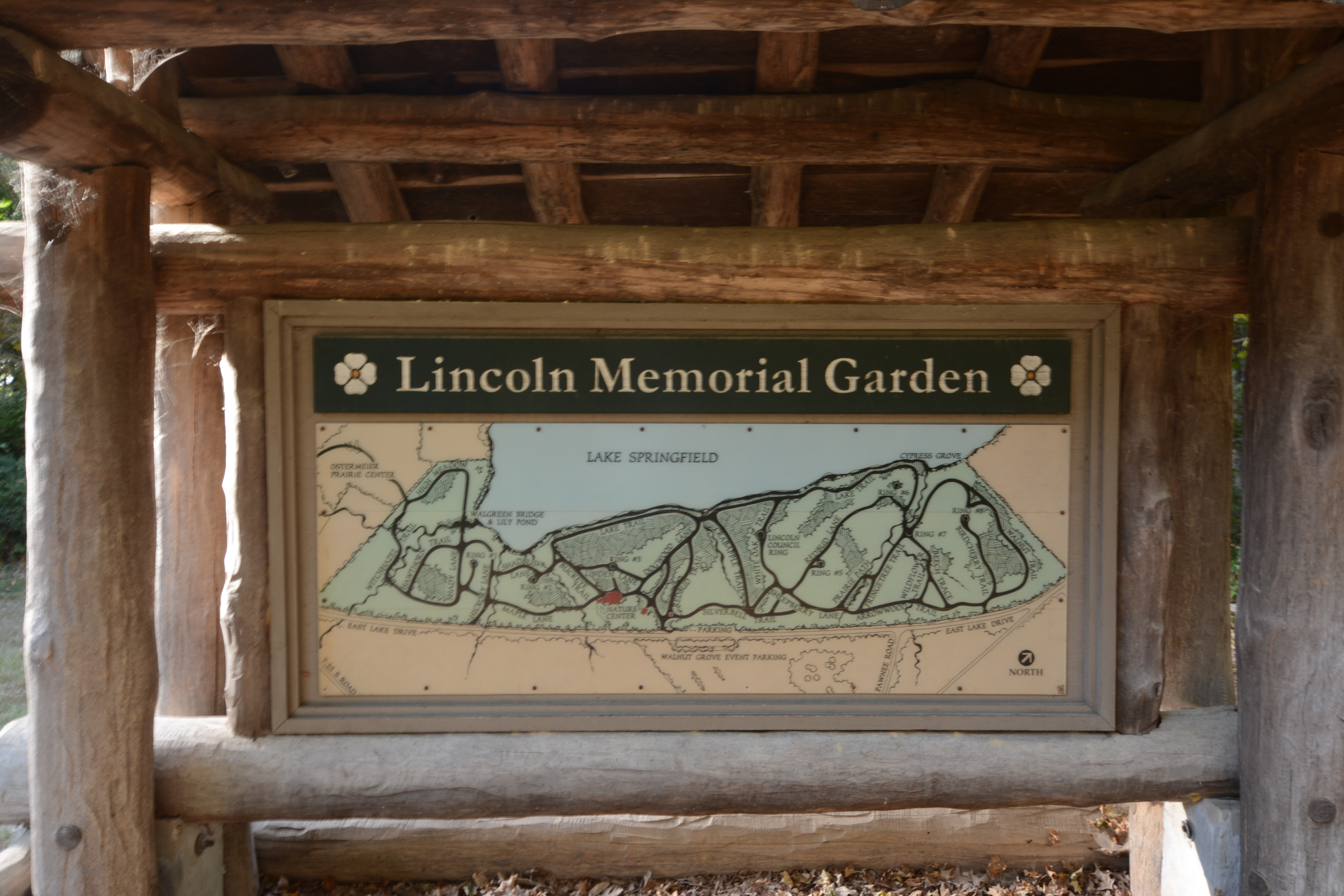

- Location within Illinois Location within the United States
- Location: 2301 E. Lake Dr., Springfield, Illinois
- Coordinates: 39°41′50″N 89°35′50″W
- Built: 1936
- Architect: Jensen, Jens
- Architectural style: Prairie School
- Website: Official website
- NRHP reference No.: 92001016
- Added to NRHP: August 12, 1992

The Abraham Lincoln Memorial Garden, commonly known and referred to as the Lincoln Memorial Garden, is a self-governing 100-acre (0.4 km^{2}) woodland and prairie garden owned by the city of Springfield, Illinois, and managed by the Abraham Lincoln Memorial Garden Foundation. The gardens are made up of two major units, the 63-acre (25 ha) Jensen section bordering Lake Springfield, and the newer 29-acre (12 ha) Ostermeier Prairie Center section. There are also 19 acres (7.7 ha) of additional buffer properties. As of April 2006, the Garden is maintained by a full-time staff of four, supplemented by more than 150 volunteers and docents.

== History ==
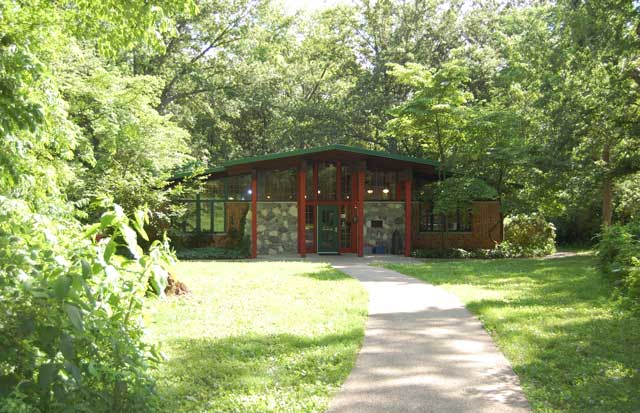

Lincoln Memorial Garden (LMG) is the inspiration of Springfield Civic Garden Club leader Harriet Knudson. When Knudson learned that the city of Springfield was acquiring land for the basin of a new reservoir, intended to serve as a source of city drinking water, she asked the city to set aside approximately 0.6 miles (1 km) of future shoreline as a garden to memorialize Abraham Lincoln. The city agreed and leased the Jensen section to Lincoln Memorial Garden in perpetuity. At the time of the lease, the future Garden site was cultivated farmland that contained approximately 12 trees.

As designer of the new garden, LMG selected Jens Jensen. A follower of the Prairie Style and its ideal of "organic architecture," Jensen designed the garden to reflect an idealized vision of the Midwestern woods and prairies. In his 1935 design, Jensen placed eight council rings, his design icon, throughout the Garden. These fire circles, built of Midwestern splitstone, are designed for groups of 12–50 people to sit together around an open fire. Most of the fire circles are situated to give all participants a view of Lake Springfield. By sitting in a fire circle, visitors have the opportunity to balance the four elements within themselves.

In 1936, the task of planting the Garden began. The Jensen plan called for 28 species of canopy trees, 14 species of intermediate-sized trees, 23 varieties of shrubs, and 11 varieties of wildflowers. All of these species are native to Illinois, Indiana, and Kentucky, Lincoln's three native states; Jensen was one of the first U.S. landscape gardeners to eschew the use of exotic plants. Construction of the Garden was helped by donations from the family of drugstore CEO Charles Walgreen. The Garden was dedicated in 1939.

In 1965, the LMG constructed a Nature Center within the Jensen Unit. In 1992, the Jensen Unit was added to the U.S. National Register of Historic Places as an example of Jensen's mature landscape design. In 1995, the 29-acre (0.12 km^{2}) Ostermeier Prairie Center was added to the Garden. The Ostermeier Unit contains approximately 20 acres (0.081 km^{2}) of Illinois tallgrass prairie under restoration.

== Recreation and activities ==
Lincoln Memorial Garden maintains approximately five miles (8 km) of footpaths. Plantings within the Jensen Unit include the white oak (the Illinois state tree), the sugar maple, the dogwood, and the redbud. Plantings within the Ostermeier Prairie Center include prairie grasses such as big bluestem, with some fire-resistant tree specimens such as bur oak.

In early spring, LMG operates one of the southernmost maple syrup festivals in Illinois. The LMG maples yield only about 10–15 gallons of dark syrup in a good year.

In October, a Fall Harvest Festival celebrates the turning of the leaves.

The garden maintains a nature center and gift store.

The grounds are open between sunrise and sunset daily.

== See also ==
- Adams Wildlife Sanctuary
