= Hunter Lake =

Proposed reservoir in Illinois, US

- Map of the proposed lake as published by City Water, Light & Power, its developer in Springfield, Illinois
- Location: Illinois, United States
- Primary inflows: Horse Creek
- Basin countries: United States
- Surface area: 2,649 acres (1,072 ha)
- Surface elevation: 568.7 ft (173.3 m)
- Settlements: Springfield

Hunter Lake is a proposed 2,649-acre (10.72 km^{2}) reservoir to be created in Illinois, United States, by damming Horse Creek, a tributary of the Sangamon River. If the lake is built, its construction would flood a section of bottomland in southeastern Sangamon County, Illinois near the city of Springfield, between two other lakes, Lake Springfield and Lake Sangchris, to an elevation of 568.7 feet above sea level. See, http://supplementalwater.cwlp.com/Documents.aspx p. 2-22. The lake is a project of City Water, Light & Power, the local municipal electric utility.

== History and today ==
The Hunter Lake project was first planned in the 1950s, after a severe 18-month record drought from fall of 1953 through March 1955 caused City Water, Light & Power's operating reservoir, Lake Springfield, to temporarily lose much of its storage capacity. Since 1955, although the severe drought of that year has not reoccurred, continued fluctuations in runoff from the Lake Springfield drainage zone has caused the lake's level to rise and fall in cycles that cannot be predicted ahead of time, and diverge much more from the lake's mean water level than had been predicted when the lake was built in the 1920s and 1930s. Nevertheless, despite fluctuations, the water level has never dropped lower than about 5 feet from full pool since 1955 even in droughts, largely because the City vastly expanded Lake Springfield's watershed by adding powerful pumps on the South Fork river, and implemented changes to assure that droughts do not begin with Lake Springfield deliberately dropping two feet to protect boat docks from winter ice as happened in 1953 ahead of the drought. Despite the fact that capacity has never again precipitously dropped, and despite the fact that wildly inaccurate assessments of growth in population and demand that spiked the original planning have never materialized, calls for the construction of Hunter Lake as a supplemental water supply persisted, and in 1989, in the midst of a drought, resulted in passage of an ordinance to begin seeking necessary permits. Water would be pumped out of, or into, Hunter Lake from Lake Springfield, in order to maintain the water level of the parent lake close to a stable, full pool level.

If Hunter Lake is built, it will provide a potential additional 12 million gallons of water per day (mgd) for City Water, Light & Power, and the city of Springfield, down 43% from its original design which would have produced 21 mgd with a dam at 571 feet above sea level. The lake's level will be managed for storage capacity purposes, which means that the lake level will fluctuate sharply with variation in precipitation, sometimes dropping 9 feet or more during dry periods. Creeks that will flow into the lake will sometimes alternate between being estuaries and mud flats. For this reason, Hunter Lake will not be an ideal reservoir for some forms of shoreline recreation, such as swimming. A 1996 study concluded that Hunter Lake had only minimal value as a recreational facility due to these fluctuations. The lake project also includes a buffer zone of 4,700 acres (1,900 ha) of forest, grassland and wetlands. Because the lake's level would fluctuate over time, much of this buffer zone would be under water part of the time, and damp or dry in other seasons. A 2019 study based on a simple survey of 625 people in the area noted that 70 percent of all respondents were satisfied with the current state of flatwater recreation in the area, but claimed nonetheless a need to develop five additional lakes the size of Hunter Lake to meet overwhelming demand.

City Water, Light & Power has purchased over 7000 acres of land to be flooded for Hunter Lake and provide the buffer zone, completed engineering studies for the lake, and has sought permits from the U.S. Army Corps of Engineers (ACE) under Section 404 of the Clean Water Act, and from the Illinois Environmental Protection Agency (IEPA) under section 401 of the Clean Water Act since 1989. As of 2016, the agencies prevented approval of the lake project three times due to flawed or inadequate studies required by the National Environmental Policy Act. The separate approvals of both the Army Corps and the IEPA are required to permit the project to go forward, and in 2010, after listing the extensive flaws in the last Environmental Impact Study, CWLP began to re-evaluate, and in 2016 the City requested to renew its permit application. The ACE then requested that a supplemental environmental impact study (SEIS) be prepared before this permit application can be considered. That SEIS was published in August 2023.

Springfield has already spent more than $25 million to purchase land to be used for Hunter Lake; there are still additional parcels to acquire. It has spent millions for studies, including over $1 million for the SEIS. The total cost of the project, as of 2016, is loosely estimated at $106 million. The total cost estimated in the 2023 SEIS is now over $153 million, but that estimate was based on only an inflation adjustment from a 2003 estimate, and did not include the SEIS proposed design changes calling for construction of additional "in-lake" dams that must be constructed in hopes of trapping phosphorus.

=== Concerns ===
Hunter Lake concerns, raised by the Army Corps of Engineers in September 2011, included: (a) the age, in years, of the information contained in the original environmental impact study (EIS) submitted by CWLP, (b) changes and additions to EIS law that have taken place since the original EIS was submitted, (c) inadequate consideration of the adaptive re-use of existing Sangamon County gravel pits as a potential water storage capacity alternative, and (d) inadequate consideration of the drilling of groundwater wells into a Central Illinois aquifer or aquifers as a potential alternative supplemental water supply.

Additional concerns raised as of 2016 include: (e) inadequate consideration of improving the water capacity of existing Lake Springfield by dredging the lake, (f) potential for the fluctuating Hunter Lake to become a place for mosquitoes to breed, (g) the impact of Hunter Lake on the neighboring municipalities of Divernon, Pawnee, and Virden, (h) stagnant water-consumption growth patterns in Springfield that call into question the cost-benefit assumptions made by the original planning documents, and (i) algae blooms in the proposed lake's shallow water. The village of Pawnee, in public comments, has expressed concerns about the Hunter Lake reservoir proposal.

Advocates and organizations opposed to Hunter Lake note that water demand has been flat for over 40 years and that CWLP's projections for high growth in population and demand are unjustified because the population is decreasing and because, by CWLP's own admission, closing three of it old water intensive power plants in 2021 increased the drought yield of Lake Springfield by 9.9 mgd. Furthermore, they say if there is any need for a back-up supply, there are better, cheaper alternatives that do not have the devastating environmental impacts of Hunter Lake (such as destruction of two streams and surrounding forests, wetlands, prairie, agricultural land, and wildlife habitat). They argue that CWLP has failed to document any need for additional flatwater recreation as well. They say CWLP will probably never get USACE planning permission to build the lake, and its proposed use as a secondary source for water supply would be better served by using its footprint as a site for solar power or wind power.

In September of 2023, the U.S. Environmental Protection Agency filed detailed comments with the U.S. Army Corps of Engineers, siding with local opponents of the project, finding that the project did not meet the requirements of Section 404 of the Clean Water Act for multiple cited reasons, and recommending denial of a permit or, in the alternative, further studies to address major concerns with the project's purpose, need, and impacts. In November 2023, the U.S. Army Corps of Engineers notified the City of numerous problems with the City's Supplemental Environmental Impact Study, and demanded further explanation and studies to address significant issues raised by the commenters on the draft Supplemental Environmental Impact Study. On April 17, 2024, after the City failed to respond, the U.S. Army Corps of Engineers notified the City that its failure to address concerns raised by citizen groups and individuals and by the Corps itself, outlined in the November 2023 letter, resulted in a determination that the Army Corps considered the permit application for Hunter Lake to be withdrawn.
