= Illinois Times =

Weekly newspaper in Springfield, Illinois

- Type: Alternative weekly
- Format: Tabloid
- Owner: Central Illinois Communications LLC
- President: Fletcher "Bud" Farrar, Jr.
- Editor: Fletcher "Bud" Farrar, Jr.
- Founded: 1975
- Headquarters: P.O. Box 5256; Springfield, Illinois 62705; United States
- Circulation: 28,000
- Website: illinoistimes.com

Illinois Times is a weekly free newspaper (distributed every Thursday) based in Springfield, Illinois, United States.

Founded in 1975, the newspaper was acquired in 1977 by Fletcher Farrar Sr., a Mount Vernon businessman who employed his son, Fletcher, Jr. (Bud), as editor. The senior Farrar died in 1995; his son sold the paper two years later. Farrar Jr. reacquired control in 2002 and returned as editor in 2008. The newspaper distributes about 20,000 copies at more than 400 locations in the Springfield, Illinois area.
