= Elkhart Township, Logan County, Illinois =

Coordinates: 39°59′18″N 89°25′16″W

Elkhart Township
- Township
- Location in Logan County

- Logan County's location in Illinois
- Country: United States
- State: Illinois
- County: Logan
- Established: November 7, 1865

Area
  - Total: 51.7 sq mi (134 km^{2})
  - Land: 51.71 sq mi (133.9 km^{2})
  - Water: 0 sq mi (0 km^{2}) 0%

Population (2020)
  - Total: 503
  - Density: 9.73/sq mi (3.76/km^{2})
- Time zone: UTC-6 (CST)
  - Summer (DST): UTC-5 (CDT)
- FIPS code: 17-107-23282

Elkhart Township is located in Logan County, Illinois. As of the 2020 census, its population was 503 and it contained 236 housing units. It contains the census-designated place of Cornland.

== Geography ==
According to the 2021 census gazetteer files, Elkhart Township has a total area of 51.71 square miles (133.93 km^{2}), all land.

== Demographics ==
As of the 2020 census there were 503 people, 203 households, and 117 families residing in the township. The population density was 9.73 inhabitants per square mile (3.76/km^{2}). There were 236 housing units at an average density of 4.56 per square mile (1.76/km^{2}). The racial makeup of the township was 94.63% White, 0.80% African American, 0.20% Native American, 0.00% Asian, 0.00% Pacific Islander, 0.20% from other races, and 4.17% from two or more races. Hispanic or Latino of any race were 1.79% of the population.

There were 203 households, out of which 14.80% had children under the age of 18 living with them, 45.81% were married couples living together, 11.82% had a female householder with no spouse present, and 42.36% were non-families. 30.00% of all households were made up of individuals, and 13.30% had someone living alone who was 65 years of age or older. The average household size was 1.99 and the average family size was 2.45.

According to the 2020 American Community Survey, township's age distribution consisted of 8.4% under the age of 18, 4.5% from 18 to 24, 23.5% from 25 to 44, 37.8% from 45 to 64, and 25.7% who were 65 years of age or older. The median age was 55.2 years. For every 100 females, there were 97.3 males. For every 100 females age 18 and over, there were 95.3 males.

The median income for a household in the township was $69,943, and the median income for a family was $70,938. Males had a median income of $43,611 versus $48,382 for females. The per capita income for the township was $36,557. About 1.7% of families and 1.5% of the population were below the poverty line, including 0.0% of those under age 18 and 2.9% of those age 65 or over.

Historical population
Census	Pop.	Note	%±
2000	582		—
2010	511		−12.2%
2020	503		−1.6%
U.S. Decennial Census
