= Buffalo Hart Township, Sangamon County, Illinois =

Coordinates: 39°53′58″N 89°25′42″W

Buffalo Hart Township
- Township
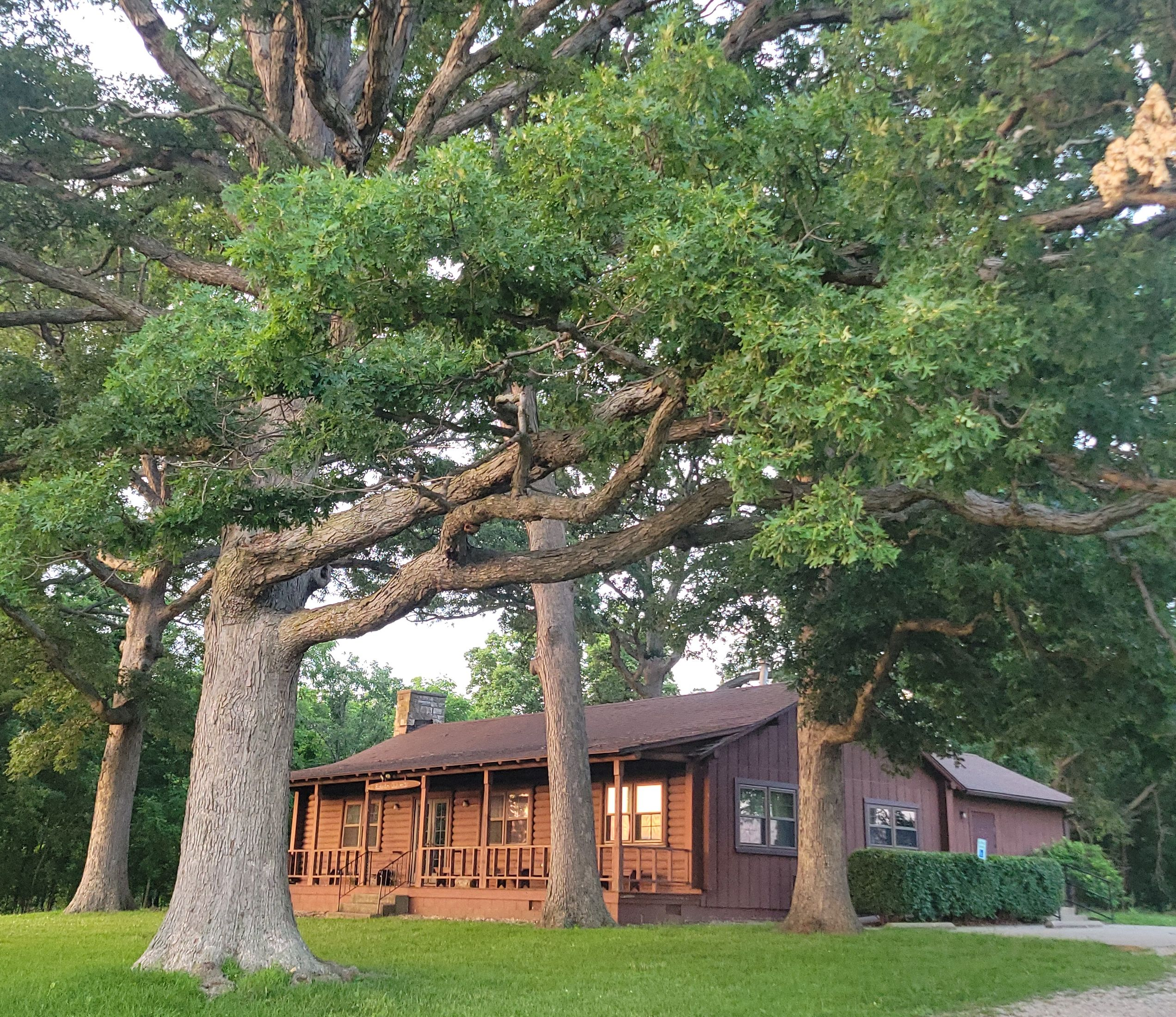
- Buffalo Hart Community Building, where the township board meets.

- Location in Sangamon County

- Sangamon County's location in Illinois
- Country: United States
- State: Illinois
- County: Sangamon
- Established: November 6, 1860

Area
  - Total: 22.71 sq mi (58.8 km^{2})
  - Land: 22.71 sq mi (58.8 km^{2})
  - Water: 0 sq mi (0 km^{2}) 0%

Population (2010)
  - Estimate (2016): 171
  - Density: 7.6/sq mi (2.9/km^{2})
- Time zone: UTC-6 (CST)
  - Summer (DST): UTC-5 (CDT)
- FIPS code: 17-167-09486

Buffalo Hart Township is located in Sangamon County, Illinois, USA. As of the 2010 census, its population was 173 and it contained 83 housing units. The township centers on the crossroads unincorporated community of Buffalo Hart and on the adjacent Buffalo Hart Grove, the remains of a historic grove of trees that once stood out amongst the tallgrass prairie of the pioneer township.

== Geography ==
According to the 2010 census, the township has a total area of 22.71 square miles (58.8 km^{2}), all land.

== Demographics ==
Historical population
Census	Pop.	Note	%±
2016 (est.)	171
U.S. Decennial Census

== Government ==
The elected officials of Buffalo Hart Township consist of a clerk, supervisor, highway commissioner, four trustees, and a three-member board of managers of the Buffalo Hart Community Building. As of 2026, all of these positions are filled by members of the Republican Party, except for the community building board, which is non-partisan.

Buffalo Hart forms a multi-township assessment unit that also includes adjacent Mechanicsburg Township. However, as of 2026, the assessor position is vacant and its functions are handled by the county supervisor of assessments.
