= Gilman, Clinton and Springfield Railroad =

Overview
- Locale: central Illinois
- Dates of operation: 1867 (158 years ago) – 1877 (148 years ago)
- Successor: Chicago and Springfield Railroad

Technical
- Track gauge: 4 ft 8 1/2 in (1,435 mm)
- Length: 111 mi (179 km)

The Gilman, Clinton and Springfield Railroad was a railroad of 111 miles (179 km) in length, chartered in 1867, that operated from 1871 until 1877 in the U.S. state of Illinois. It provided service from Springfield, the state capital, to Gilman, a junction point on the main line of the much larger Illinois Central Railroad. After operation for a short period as an independent short line, the Gilman, Clinton and Springfield underwent financial failure and was merged into the Chicago and Springfield Railroad, an affiliate of the Illinois Central.

== History ==
The late 1860s and early 1870s, the period immediately following the American Civil War, was a boom time in the construction of American steam railroads, with investment capital abundant and rails laid to a large number of rural towns and counties that had not previously enjoyed service.

The Gilman, Clinton and Springfield was an example of this phenomenon. Its backers were aware of a triangular, underserved slice of Illinois agricultural land in east-central Illinois; farmers had to haul their crops many miles to the nearest siding, either west to the Chicago and Alton or east to the Illinois Central. By building a competing railroad line through Mount Pulaski, Clinton, Farmer City, and Gibson City, the new railroad could serve this slice of rural Illinois. In particular, the new railroad became the prime provider of railroad service to much of strongly agricultural DeWitt County.

The new railroad acquired a charter in 1867 and began grading, leveling and planning the roadbed in 1870. The new railroad ran its first train in October 1871. Soon afterwards, however, the Long Depression of the mid-1870s caused a sharp slowdown in economic activity throughout the United States, and the new railroad defaulted on the debt it had sold to build its main line; it was forced by a court in December 1873 to enter receivership.

Litigation showed that the young railroad's financial status had been doomed by Gilded Age conduct that approached, or crossed the line, into deliberate looting. The fledgling rail line's board of directors had borrowed $4.0 million and hired a contractor, the Morgan Improvement Company, to build the line. The Morgan Improvement Company paid $1.5 million to build the line, leaving $2.5 million in profits for itself of which a substantial share was paid, apparently in bribes, to the members of the Gilman line's board of directors. The Morgan Improvement Company was a subsidiary of the Pennsylvania Railroad.

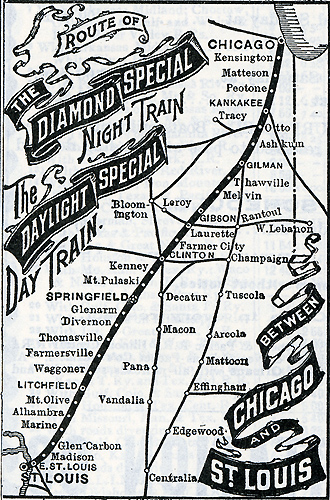
January 1901 Illinois Central map, showing their acquisition of the Gilman, Clinton and Springfield right-of-way.

== Aftermath ==
The failure of the Gilman, Clinton and Springfield indirectly sparked litigation that included a case heard by the United States Supreme Court, Hinckley v. Gilman Clinton and Springfield Railroad, 94 U.S. 467 (1876); the foreclosure of the railroad led to a legal dispute between the railroad's successor-in-interest and a court-appointed receiver.

Meanwhile, the right-of-way built for the Gilman, Clinton and Springfield became a separately-incorporated branch line, called the Chicago and Springfield, of the more financially stable Illinois Central (IC). The branch line operated as such from 1877 until shortly after 1899, when the IC acquired a second segment of railroad line, a former chunk of the St. Louis, Peoria and Northern Railway, thereby allowing the former Gilman line to become part of a second main line from Chicago to St. Louis. The Chicago and Springfield charter served no further purpose, and was wound up in 1902.

Illinois Route 54 almost exactly parallels the route of the former Gilman, Clinton and Springfield; in some places, the state highway is only feet away from the rail right-of-way, now a part of the Canadian National. Passenger train service ceased in 1971.
