= City Water, Light & Power =

Municipally-owned utility in Illinois, U.S.

- Type: Public Utility
- Industry: Electric & Water Utility
- Founded: January 2, 1911
- Headquarters: Springfield, Illinois, United States
- Area served: Springfield, Illinois Metropolitan Area
- Key people: vacant (General Manager); Doug Brown (Chief Utilities Engineer); Scott Rogers (Electric Division Manager); Ted Meckes (Water Division Manager)
- Revenue: US$6,526,986.94 (2010)
- Owner: City of Springfield
- Number of employees: 643
- Divisions: Electric Division, Water Division, Lake Springfield
- Website: www.cwlp.com

City Water, Light & Power (CWLP) is the largest municipally owned utility in the U.S. state of Illinois. The utility provides the city of Springfield, Illinois, with electric power from one coal-fired boiler at the Dallman Power Plant. The boiler operates with water from the utility's wholly owned Lake Springfield, which also provides drinking water for the city. The utility also owns much of the riparian property around Lake Springfield, some of which is preserved for local recreation and some of which is leased to local nonprofits, such as Lincoln Memorial Gardens.

The utility has long-term plans, with no fixed completion date set, to construct a second reservoir, Hunter Lake. In addition, CWLP is moving away from coal into other forms of electrical sourcing and production. On February 4, 2020, the city of Springfield gave final approval to a plan to shut down two of CWLP's four coal boilers by December 2020.
