= List of covered bridges in Illinois =

Below is a list of covered bridges in Illinois. There are nine authentic covered bridges in the U.S. state of Illinois. Five of them are historic. A covered bridge is considered authentic not due to its age, but by its construction. An authentic bridge is constructed using trusses rather than other methods such as stringers, a popular choice for non-authentic covered bridges.

== Bridges ==
Name	Image	County	Location	Built	Length	Crosses	Ownership	Truss	Notes
Captain Swift Covered Bridge	Captain Swift Covered Bridge	Bureau	Princeton; 41°22′44″N 89°29′52″W	2007	128 feet (39 m)	Bureau Creek		Pratt variant and arches	
Jackson Covered Bridge		Cumberland	Greenup; 39°14′20″N 88°11′14″W	2000	192 feet (59 m)	Embarras River		Multiple king and arch	
Mary's River Covered Bridge	Mary's River Covered Bridge	Randolph	Chester; 37°56′55″N 89°45′57″W	1854, restored 1954 and 2005	98 feet (30 m)	Little Marys River	Illinois DOT	Burr	
Oquawka Wagon Bridge	Oquawka Wagon Bridge	Henderson	Oquawka; 40°53′39″N 90°56′57″W	1866, restored 1982	106 feet (32 m)	Henderson Creek	State of Illinois	Burr	Also called Allaman or Eames Bridge
Red Covered Bridge	Red Covered Bridge	Bureau	Princeton; 41°24′59″N 89°28′43″W	1863	93 feet (28 m)	Big Bureau Creek	Illinois DOT	Howe	
Rockford Bolt Co.		Boone	North Caledonia; 42°24′41″N 88°56′22″W	1890	75 feet (23 m)	Kinnikinnick Creek	Private	Howe	Also called Young Covered Bridge
Stickelback Covered Bridge		Kendall	Newark; 41°35′9″N 88°35′20″W	2020	45 feet (14 m)	Stream		Town	
Sugar Creek Covered Bridge	Sugar Creek Covered Bridge	Sangamon	Chatham; 39°38′25″N 89°39′43″W	1827 or 1880, restored 1965	58 feet (18 m)	Sugar Creek	Illinois DOT	Multiple king with arch	Also called Glenarm or Hedley Bridge
Thompson Mill Covered Bridge	Thompson Mill Covered Bridge	Shelby	Cowden; 39°15′30″N 88°49′5″W	1868	105 feet (32 m)	Kaskaskia River	Illinois DOT	Howe	Also called Dry Point Bridge
Wolf Covered Bridge		Knox	Haw Creek; 40°51′24″N 90°6′36″W	1999	102 feet (31 m)	Spoon River		Howe	Replaced a covered bridge built in 1865

== See also ==
- List of bridges on the National Register of Historic Places in Illinois
- List of covered bridges in the United States
- World Guide to Covered Bridges
