= Cotton Hill (disambiguation) =

Cotton Hill is a fictional character on the television series King of the Hill.

Cotton Hill may also refer to:

- Cotton Hill (Limestone County, Alabama), a historic mansion and plantation
- Cotton Hill, West Virginia
- Cotton Hill, Illinois, a former community under Lake Springfield
- Cotton Hill Township, Sangamon County, Illinois
