= Cotton Township =

Cotton Township may refer to the following townships in the United States:

- Cotton Township, Switzerland County, Indiana
- Cotton Township, St. Louis County, Minnesota

== See also ==
- Cotton Hill Township, Sangamon County, Illinois
