= Cotton Hill, Illinois =

Cotton Hill
- Flooded town
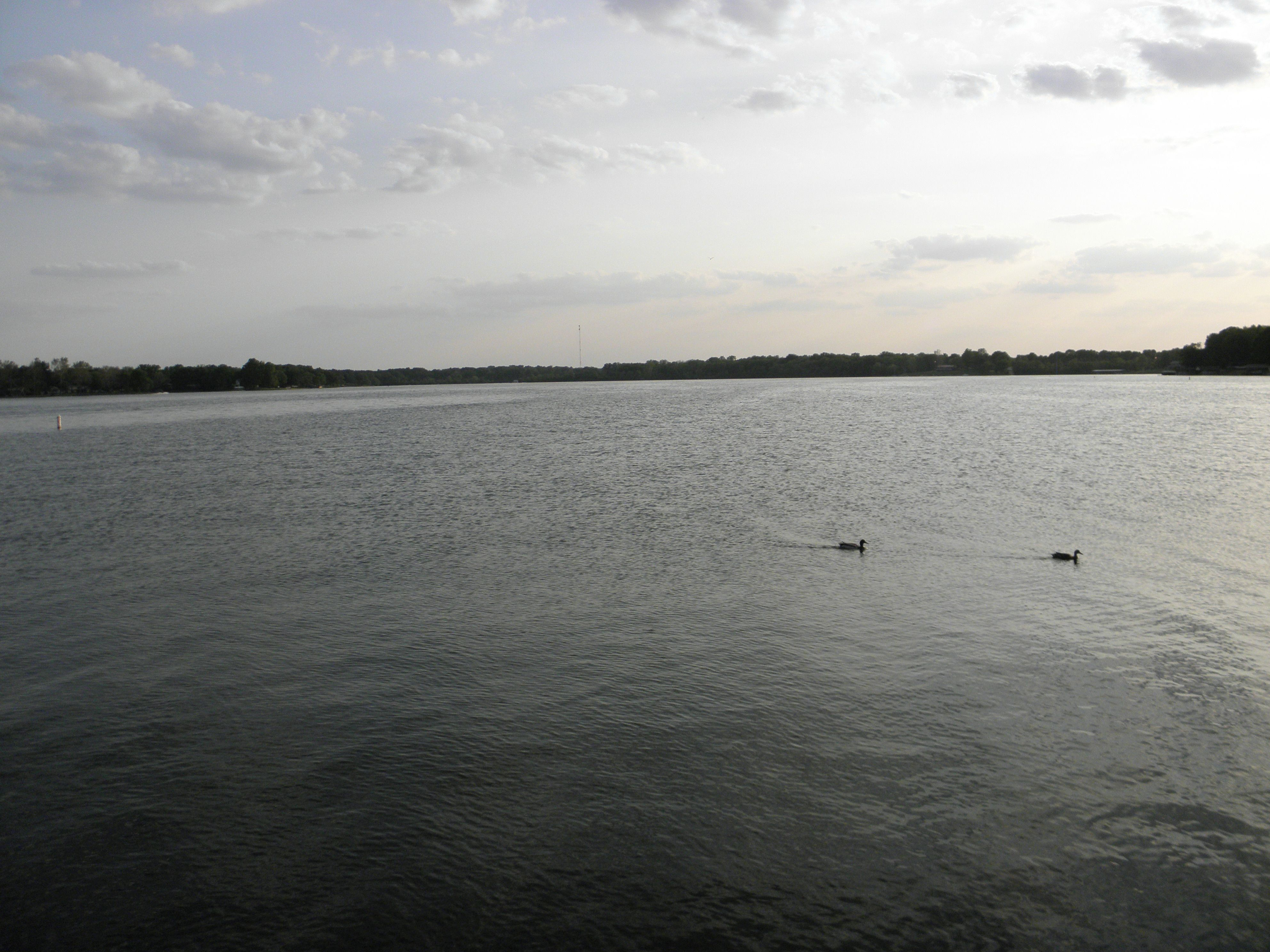
- Waters of Lake Springfield above former site of Cotton Hill

- Location within Illinois
- Coordinates: 39°41′43″N 89°37′44″W
- Country: United States
- State: Illinois
- County: Sangamon
- Township: Ball
- Mill built: 1827
- Razed and flooded: 1935
- Named for: Cotton Hill Township
- Elevation: 550 ft (170 m)

Cotton Hill, also known as Crow's Mill or Cotton Hill Post Office, was a small unincorporated community on the banks of Sugar Creek in Ball Township, Sangamon County, Illinois, about eight miles south of downtown Springfield. It stood for slightly over a century, from the 1820s until it was razed in the 1930s to make way for Lake Springfield. In 1900 the community had an estimated population of 150, a post office and a train station on the Illinois Central. Just before its demolition in the 1930s the community had a store, a schoolhouse, a blacksmith's shop, and a gas station on Route 66.

== Name ==
The town was originally known as Crow's Mill for the gristmill around which the community took shape, which was acquired by the Crow family around 1850 and operated by them for many years.

Despite the name "Cotton Hill", the town was not named directly for either a hill or a cotton crop. It acquired the name of Cotton Hill in the late 1860s, when the post office serving Ball and Cotton Hill townships was moved there from its initial location several miles away, on the boundary between the two townships.

== Business and economy ==
The Sugar Creek valley in which Cotton Hill is built, which lay along the Edwards Trace, attracted settlement from an early date. The mill at Cotton Hill was first built in 1827 as a water-powered saw mill. It was the first water-powered mill in present-day Ball Township; earlier mills in the area had been horse mills. The original sawmill was subsequently expanded to encompass a gristmill and a distillery, and to operate on both water and steam power.

Around 1826, an extended family of potters including the Ebeys, Royals and Brunks established a pottery at Cotton Hill. Located south of the town and above the present-day waters of Lake Springfield, the Ebey-Brunk pottery continued in operation until about 1854, and has been excavated as an archeological site. The pottery specialized in large, utilitarian redware pots.

In the 1830s a limestone quarry was dug near Crow's Mill. It provided the limestone for the Old State Capitol in Springfield. The limestone (known as Crow's Mill limestone) unfortunately turned an unsightly shade of brown after prolonged exposure to the atmosphere. However, it continued to find various practical uses. When visited by the state geologist in 1912, the original Crow's Mill quarry was grown over and abandoned, but a new quarry had been established a quarter-mile to the west.

== Transportation ==
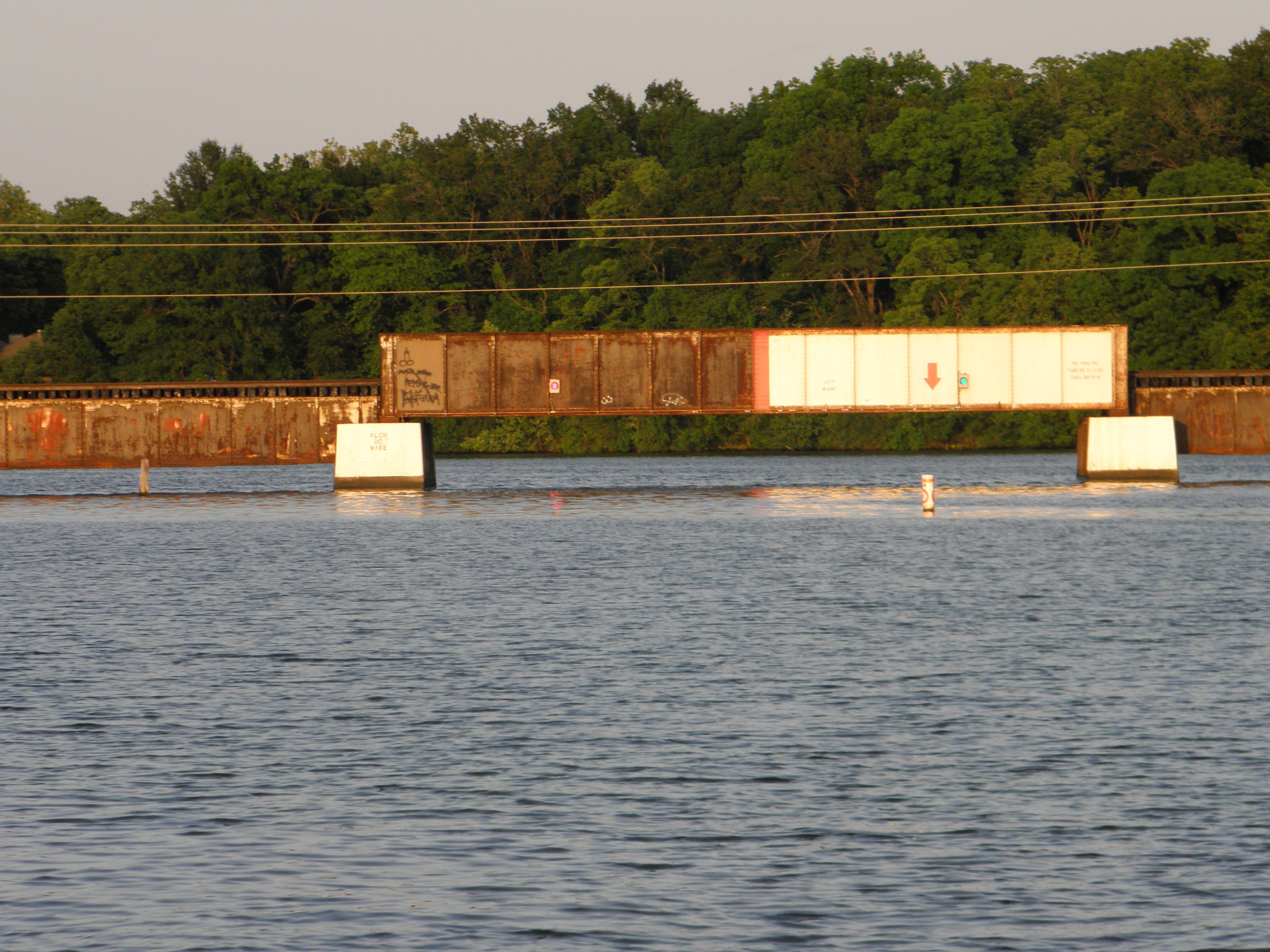
Railroad bridge just west of the site of Cotton Hill in Lake Springfield.

Cotton Hill had strong transportation connections even in the earliest days, thanks to its location on the Edwards Trace. In the 1830s and 1840s the stone blocks for the state capitol were hauled north to Springfield over the wagon roads by teams of ten to twelve oxen each.

The railroad came to Cotton Hill in the late 1880s, with the establishment of the Chicago and St. Louis Railway, which later became the Jacksonville-Southeastern Railway, and in 1900 became the Litchfield division of the Illinois Central Railroad. The nearest stops to Cotton Hill Station were Glenarm six miles to the south and Gatton Station (later Toronto) one mile to the north.

In 1901 the Illinois Central ceased service to Cotton Hill and began stopping a mile north at Gatton. The Cotton Hill post office was discontinued in 1907. The road through Cotton Hill was named as a state aid highway in 1913, following the path that Route 66 would follow from 1930 to 1935, north to Springfield and south to Glenarm.

== Legacy ==
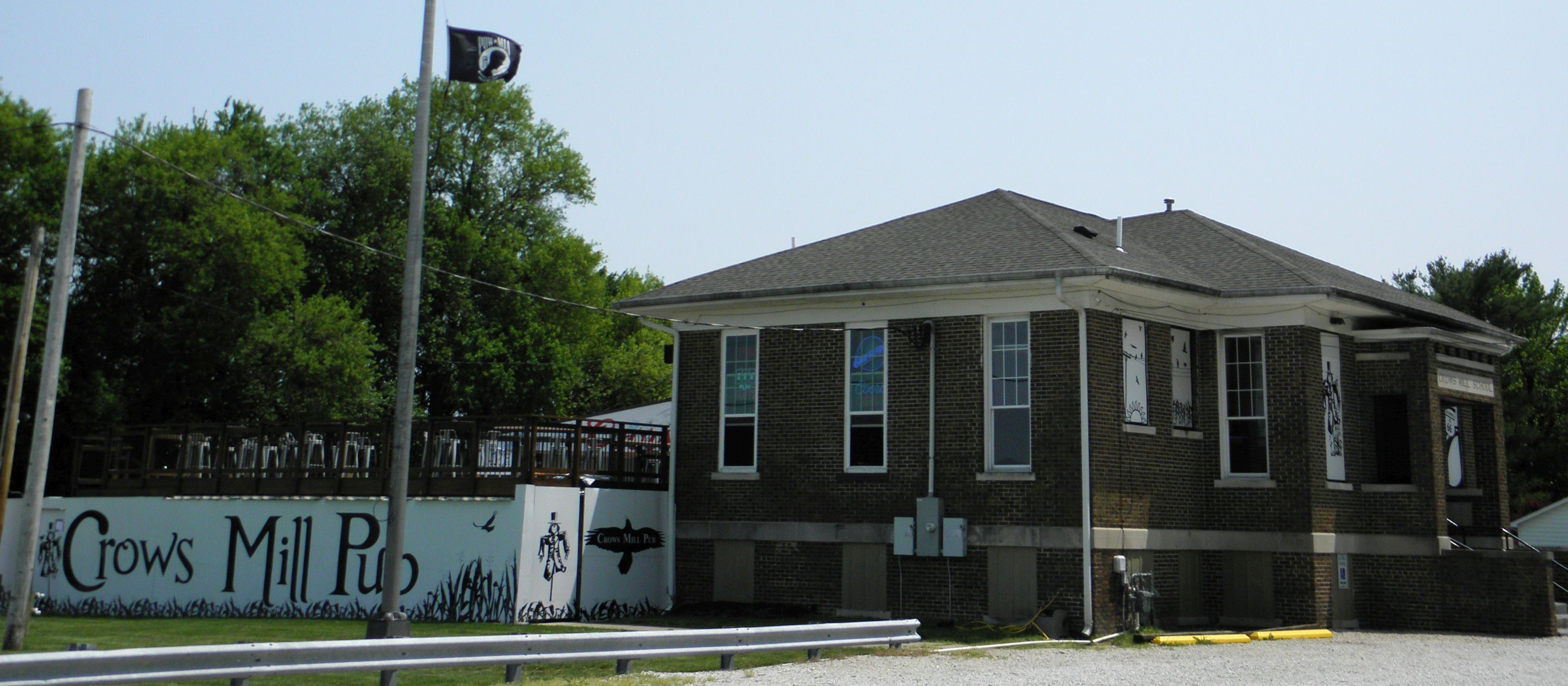
The former Crow's Mill schoolhouse at Cotton Hill, now the Crow's Mill Pub in Springfield.

The community's names lives on in the name of Cotton Hill Road, which follows the former alignment of Route 66 leading toward the town; East and West Cottonhill Parks on the shores of Lake Springfield; and the Crow's Mill Pub, a bar that occupied the relocated North Crow's Mill schoolhouse near Toronto.

Crow's Mill limestone can be found not only in the Old State Capitol but in two "blanks" used for the capitol stones, which are preserved in parks on the shores of Lake Springfield.Crows Mill pub closed in 2024.
