= Thompson Mill Covered Bridge =

- U.S. National Register of Historic Places
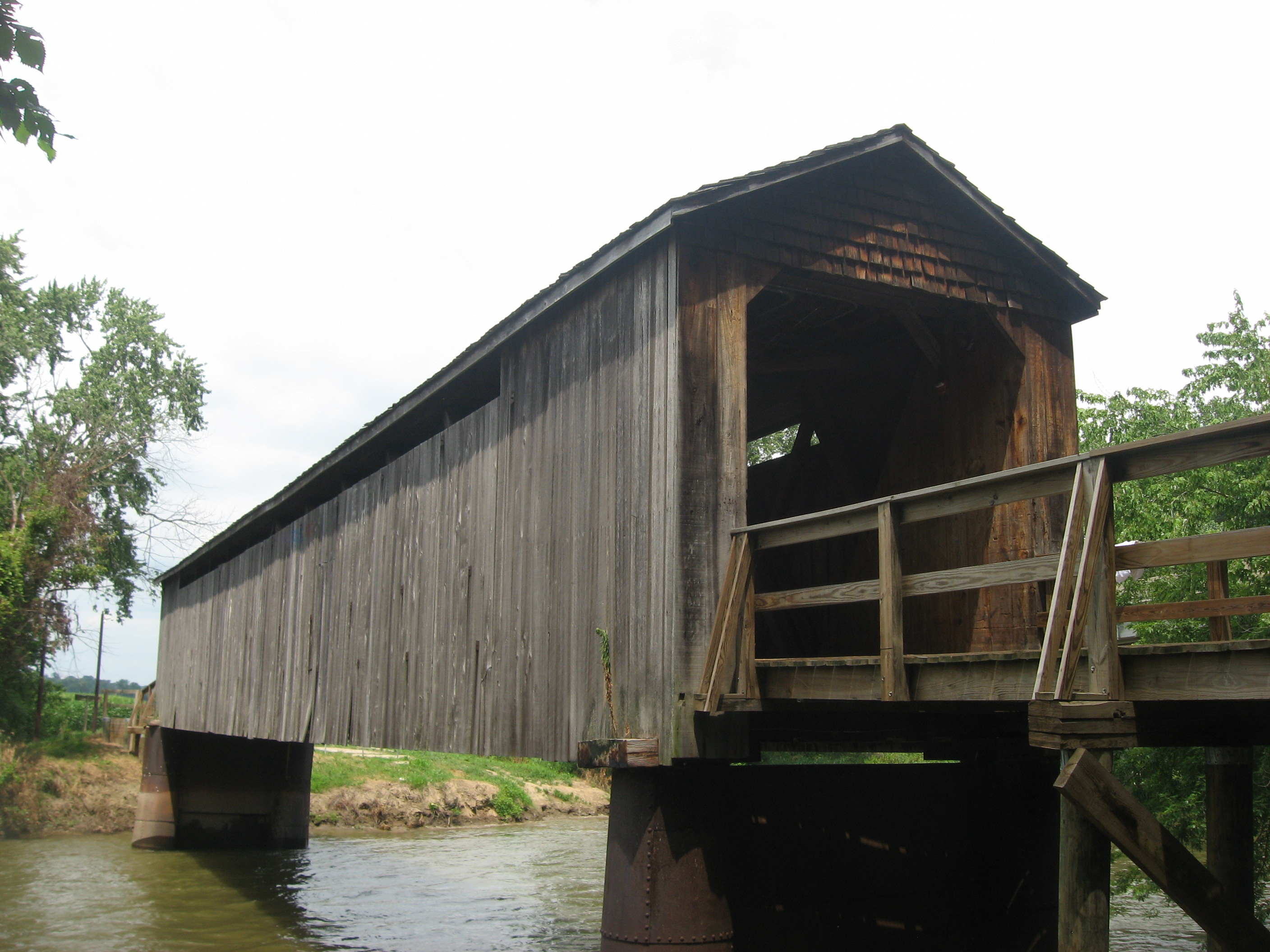

- Location within Illinois Location within the United States
- Nearest city: Cowden, Illinois
- Coordinates: 39°15′30″N 88°49′5″W
- Area: 0.5 acres (0.20 ha)
- Built: 1868
- NRHP reference No.: 75000675
- Added to NRHP: March 13, 1975

Thompson Mill Covered Bridge is a covered bridge which crosses the Kaskaskia River 2 miles (3.2 km) northeast of Cowden, Illinois. The 160-foot-4-inch (48.87 m) Howe truss bridge is only 10 feet 7 inches (3.23 m) wide, making it the narrowest covered bridge in Illinois. The bridge was constructed in 1868; it was built in Michigan, shipped to Shelbyville, and hauled to the river crossing by horse-drawn wagons. The road the bridge carried was an important transportation corridor connecting Springfield, Taylorville, and Effingham. The bridge also provided area residents access to the Thompson Mill, a corn mill and sawmill which operated from 1843 to 1914.

The bridge was added to the National Register of Historic Places on March 13, 1975. It is now one of only five historic covered bridges remaining in Illinois. The bridge has been closed to automobile traffic but remains open to pedestrians.

== See also ==
- List of covered bridges in Illinois
