= Ball Township, Sangamon County, Illinois =

Coordinates: 39°38′51″N 89°38′56″W

Ball Township
- Township
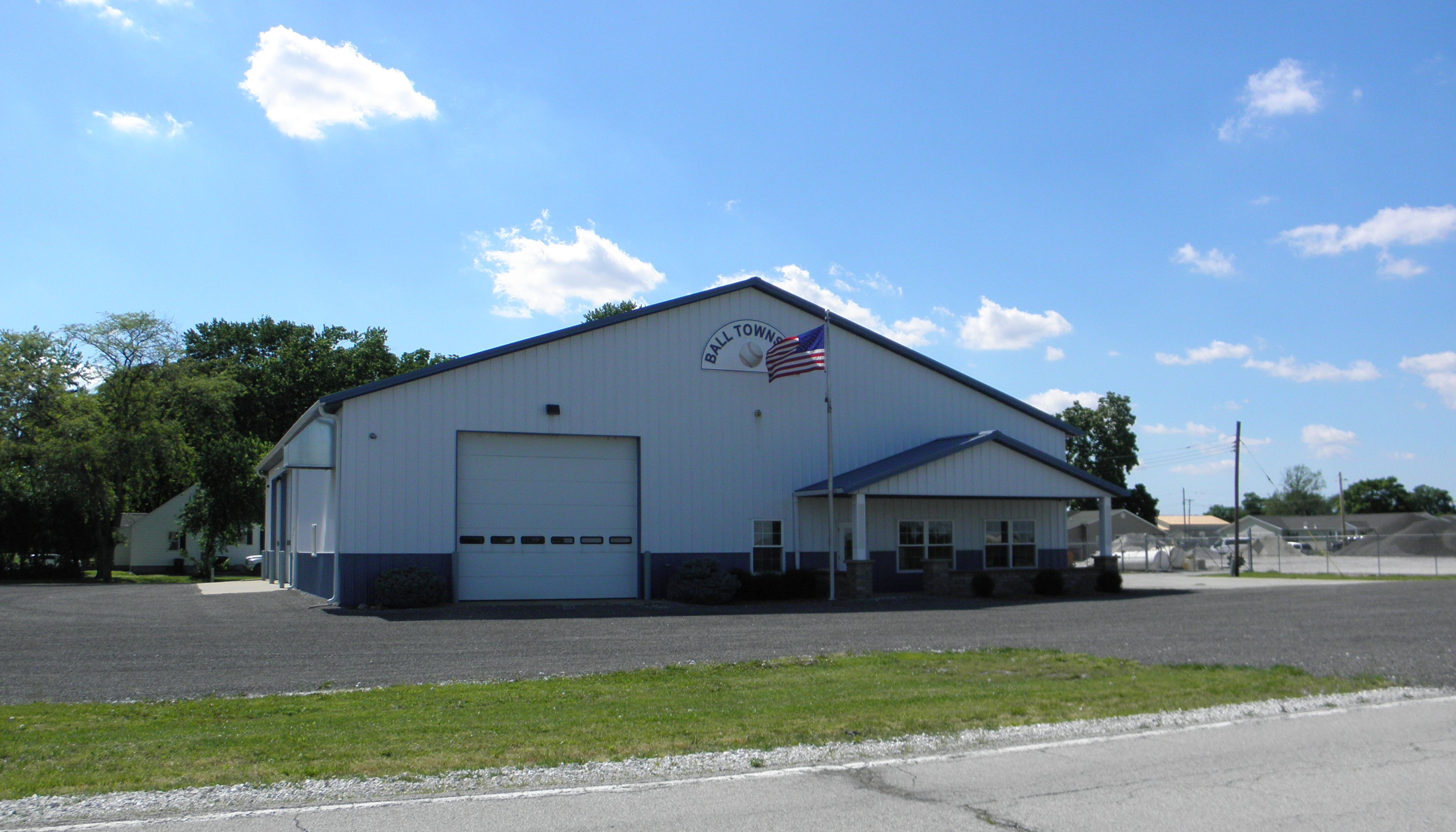
- Ball Township government building

- Location in Sangamon County

- Sangamon County's location in Illinois
- Country: United States
- State: Illinois
- County: Sangamon
- Established: November 6, 1860

Area
  - Total: 29.94 sq mi (77.5 km^{2})
  - Land: 29.87 sq mi (77.4 km^{2})
  - Water: 0.07 sq mi (0.18 km^{2}) 0.23%

Population (2010)
  - Estimate (2016): 7,062
  - Density: 224.4/sq mi (86.6/km^{2})
- Time zone: UTC-6 (CST)
  - Summer (DST): UTC-5 (CDT)
- FIPS code: 17-167-03506

Ball Township is located in Sangamon County, Illinois. As of the 2010 census, its population was 6,701 and it contained 2,403 housing units. The township's offices are located in Glenarm. Portions of the village of Chatham are located in this township. Portions of Lake Springfield are also located in the township, including the former site of the flooded town of Cotton Hill.

== Geography ==
According to the 2010 census, the township has a total area of 29.94 square miles (77.5 km^{2}), of which 29.87 square miles (77.4 km^{2}) (or 99.77%) is land and 0.07 square miles (0.18 km^{2}) (or 0.23%) is water.

Historical population
| Census | Pop. | Note | %± |
|---|---|---|---|
| 2016 (est.) | 7,062 |
U.S. Decennial Census
