= Oquawka Wagon Bridge =

- U.S. National Register of Historic Places
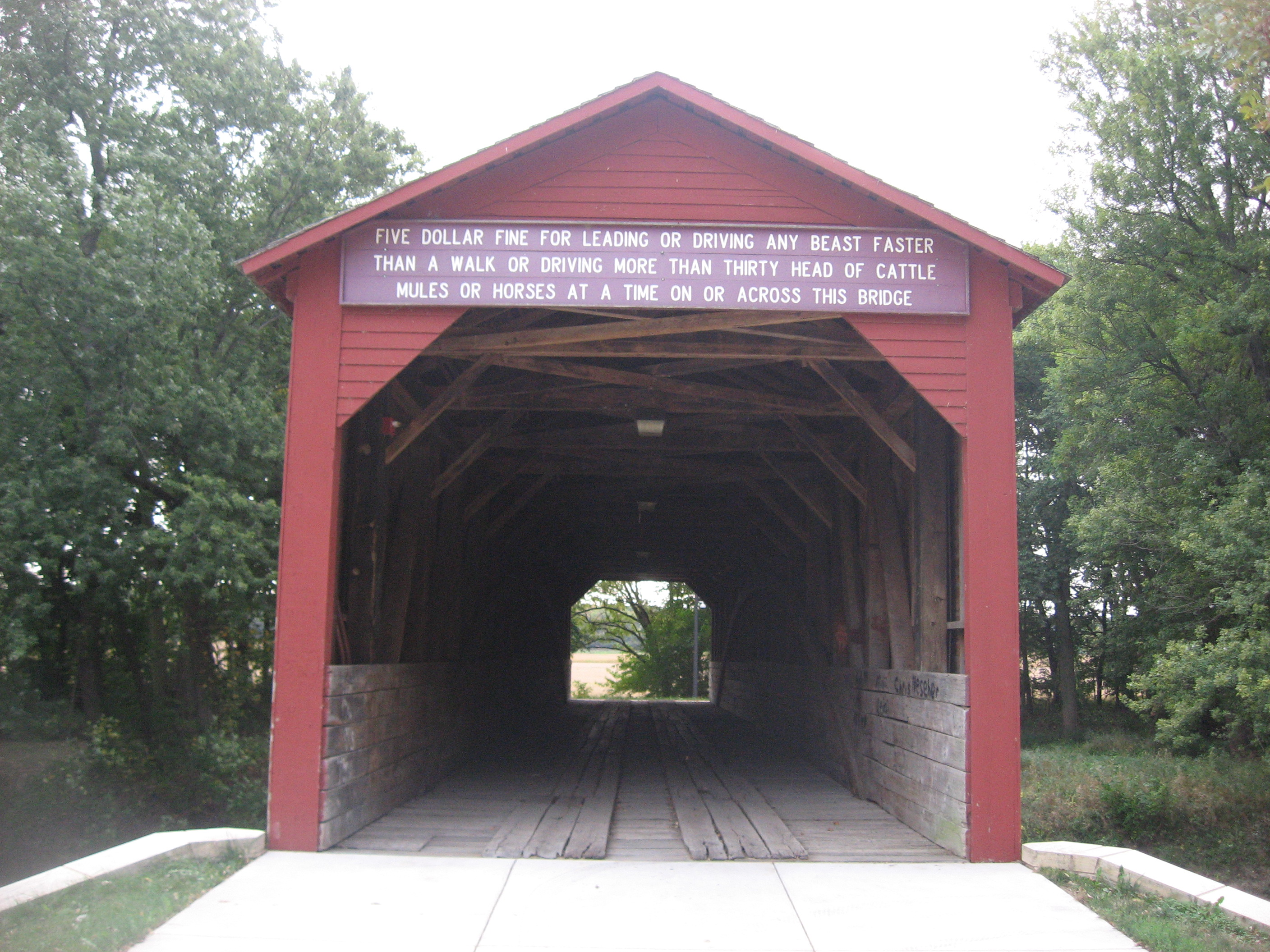
- Northwestern portal

- Location within Illinois Location within the United States
- Nearest city: Oquawka, Illinois
- Coordinates: 40°53′39″N 90°56′57″W
- Area: 1 acre (0.40 ha)
- Built: 1866
- Built by: Allaman, Jacob; Sloan, Frisby
- Architectural style: Burr Arch Truss
- NRHP reference No.: 75000660
- Added to NRHP: February 24, 1975

The Oquawka Wagon Bridge is a covered bridge located 2.5 miles (4.0 km) south of Oquawka in Henderson County, Illinois. The wooden bridge was built in 1866, replacing an earlier bridge called the Eames Bridge; the bridge structure cost $2,125, while its stone abutments cost $2.40 per perch. The bridge carried a road over Henderson Creek until 1935, when the state government moved the roadway; in the following year, the bridge became a pedestrian bridge, and the state opened a picnic area in its vicinity. The bridge was added to the National Register of Historic Places in 1975.

== See also ==
- List of covered bridges in Illinois
