= Glenwood High School (Illinois) =

Location
- 1501 East Plummer Blvd; Chatham, Illinois 62629; United States; 39.6895°N 89.6894°W

Information
- Type: Public high school
- School district: Ball Chatham Community Unit School District 5
- Superintendent: Becca Lamon
- NCES School ID: 170492000184
- Principal: Ryan Green
- Grades: 9–12
- Gender: Co-educational
- Enrollment: 1,468 (2023–2024)
- Campus type: Urban
- Colors: Red, black, and white
- Athletics conference: Central State Eight
- Team name: Titans
- Newspaper: Titan Torch
- Website: www.chathamschools.org/o/ghs

Glenwood High School is a public high school in Chatham, Illinois, United States. It is the only high school in the Ball Chatham Community Unit School District 5, which is in Southern Sangamon County, and includes Chatham, Glenarm, and the Southern portion of Springfield, Illinois.

== History ==
=== Ball Township ===
Ball Township High School, sometimes called Ball Township Community High School, opened in September 1923 with 35 students; 2 seniors graduated at the end of the 1923–1924 school year. The school was established on New City Road, approximately four miles east of Chatham, three miles north and one mile east of Glenarm.

There were numerous additions to the original school building, including the 1935 gymnasium.

Ball Township graduated 21 seniors in May 1948, after which it picked up all the students from Chatham High School. The first combined Ball Township graduating class, under Ball Chatham Community Unit School District 5, was 34 seniors in May 1949.

The last Ball Township High School graduating class was 1956, with 43 students. Students then moved to the first Glenwood High School when it opened in March 1957. Since then various combinations of grades have used the Ball Township site. The original 1924 section of the school was torn down in June 2013, but newer sections remain and continue to be used as Ball Elementary School.

=== Chatham ===
The Caldwell School was a combination grade school and high school built in 1895, paid for by local resident Ben Franklin Caldwell. Caldwell later became a state representative and state senator in the Illinois General Assembly and afterwards a congressman. The 1895 schoolhouse burnt down in 1904, and a new one built in 1905. Chatham High School, operating in this Caldwell School, was a recognized 4-year high school until 1919. It was reduced to 2 years from 1919 to May 1924, and then extended to 3 years from 1924 to 1938.

In 1938, Chatham High School became a 4-year high school again with its own new building that cost $32,000.

Chatham ended as a high school in May 1948 with 34 students, of which 8 were graduating seniors. Upon consolidation into Ball Chatham Community Unit School District 5 in 1948, students went to Ball Township High School.

=== Glenwood ===
Originally located in Chatham, the school has moved twice. As the district outgrew the original school, Glenwood was moved eastward, where it was not confined by the residential boundaries of the older locations. In more recent years, however, that location likewise became too crowded. The school district put up a referendum and won funding, allowing it to move the high school again, to its current location at 1501 East Plummer Blvd. The new 27-million-dollar building was built to accommodate Glenwood's rapidly growing list of pupils.

== Academic statistics ==
Glenwood High School (GHS), based on the 2008 PSAE scores, was ranked in the top 50 high schools in Illinois. In 2026, GHS was ranked as top high school in the Springfield Metro area. All students in Illinois are required to take the ACT exam during their junior and senior year in high school. The SAT examination is optional, and few students elect to take this test. In 2008, though, one GHS student scored 2350 and was a National Merit Scholar. Academic averages are:

ACT

- Composite: 22.2
- English: 21.7
- Math: 21.6
- Reading: 22.9
- Science: 22.2

PSAE Meets/Exceeds

- Reading: 63.3%
- Math: 60.7%
- Writing: 67.0%
- Science: 63.5%
- Social Studies: 63.4%

== Sports ==
Glenwood participates in various Illinois High School Association (IHSA) sports, including: baseball (boys), basketball (boys' teams and girls' teams), competitive cheerleading (girls' teams and boys/girls team), competitive dance team (girls), cross country (boys/girls), football (boys), golf (boys' teams and girls' teams), soccer (boys' teams and girls' teams), softball (girls), swimming (boys' teams and girls' teams), tennis (boys' teams and girls' teams), track & field (boys' teams and girls' teams), volleyball (girls), wrestling (boys team and girls team), Mock Trial, Show Choir, Speech, and Scholastic Bowl. The school also participates in ice hockey competition outside the IHSA.

The mascot of Glenwood High is the Titans. The previous mascot, the Redskins, was changed to the more culturally sensitive "Titans" by the school district in August 2001, upon the opening of the new high-school facility. This action upset some Chatham residents who had previously defeated several referendums seeking to change the Redskin mascot.

== Clubs and other activities ==
- Academic Challenge
- American Sign Language Club
- Aviation Club
- Bass Fishing Club
- Color Guard
- Craft Club
- Creative Writing Club
- Cross Cultures Club
- Dungeons and Dragons Club
- Environmental Club
- eSports Club
- Film Club
- Jazz Band
- Key Club
- Marching Band
- Mock United Nations
- Muslim Student Association
- National Honor Society
- Robotics and Engineering Club
- Social Justice Club
- Student Council
- STEM Club
- Teen Book Club
- Women in STEM Club

== Television programming ==
Glenwood High School also offers news and sports coverage that goes under the name GCNN, which is short for Glenwood Cable News Network. This program was founded in 1984. Programs include the weekly sports show known as "The Rush" and daily news known as the "First Five". The network is also known for Live Sports, which include Football and Basketball. In early 2014 GCNN Coordinator, Ryan Bandy, announced his resignation after the calendar school year. The long lasting program came to a close in 2016 after low attendance numbers and district wide budget cuts. The program has attempted to make a recovery thanks to some students with the new name GNN, Glenwood News Network.

== Demographics ==
- Racial/Ethnic Background
  - White: 75.5%
  - Black: 5.7%
  - Hispanic: 5.1%
  - Asian: 5.6%
  - Two or More Races: 8.1%
- Other Data
  - Low Income: 17.7%
  - Limited English Proficiency: 1.1%
  - Dropout Rate: 1.0%
  - Chronic Absenteeism: 5.0%

== Notable alumni ==
- Brad Booker (class of 1991) — Academy Award Winning Producer (War Is Over!) and Animator
- Reid Detmers (class of 2017) — Major League Baseball pitcher
- Daniel Helm — National Football League tight end
- Nick Maton (class of 2015) — Major League Baseball infielder
- Phil Maton (class of 2011) — Major League Baseball pitcher
- Josh Swickard (class of 2009) — model and actor
- Jayson Werth (class of 1997) — Major League Baseball outfielder
- Luke Lehnen (class of 2020) — United Football League quarterback
