= Sugar Creek Covered Bridge =

- U.S. National Register of Historic Places
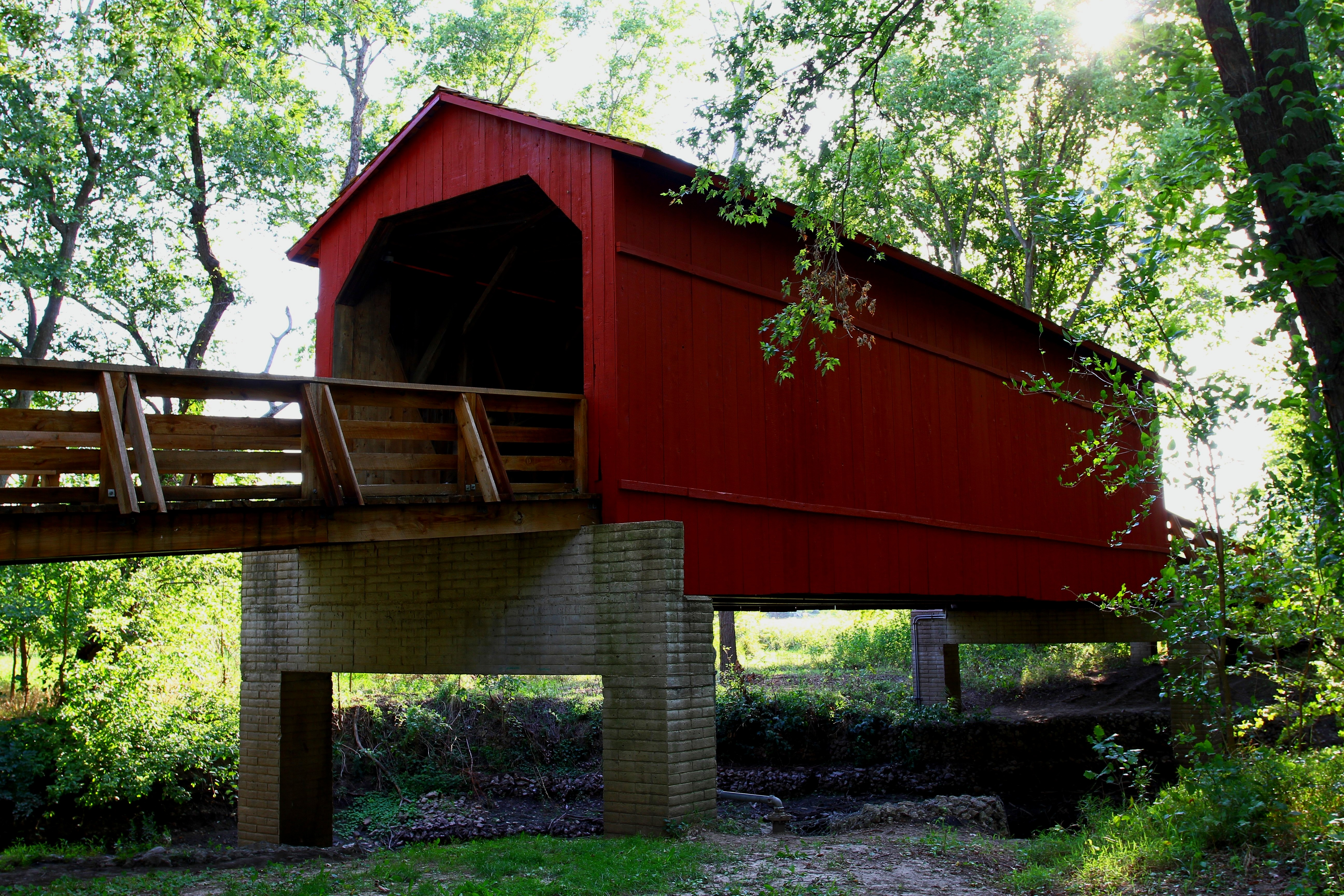

- Location within Illinois Location within the United States
- Nearest city: Chatham, Illinois
- Coordinates: 39°38′25″N 89°39′43″W
- Area: 0.5 acres (0.20 ha)
- Built: 1827 or 1880
- Built by: Black, Thomas
- Architectural style: Wooden-trussed bridge
- NRHP reference No.: 78001185
- Added to NRHP: January 9, 1978

Sugar Creek Covered Bridge is a covered bridge which crosses Sugar Creek southeast of Chatham, Illinois. The Burr truss bridge is 110 feet (34 m) long and 30 feet (9.1 m) wide. The bridge was constructed by Thomas Black; sources disagree on the date of construction, placing it at either 1827 or 1880. The State of Illinois acquired the bridge in 1963 and extensively renovated it two years later. The bridge closed to traffic in 1984 and is now part of a local park with a picnic area. It is one of only five historic covered bridges in Illinois and is the oldest of the remaining bridges.

The bridge was added to the National Register of Historic Places on January 9, 1978.

== See also ==
- List of covered bridges in Illinois
