= Nick Maton =

American baseball player (born 1997)

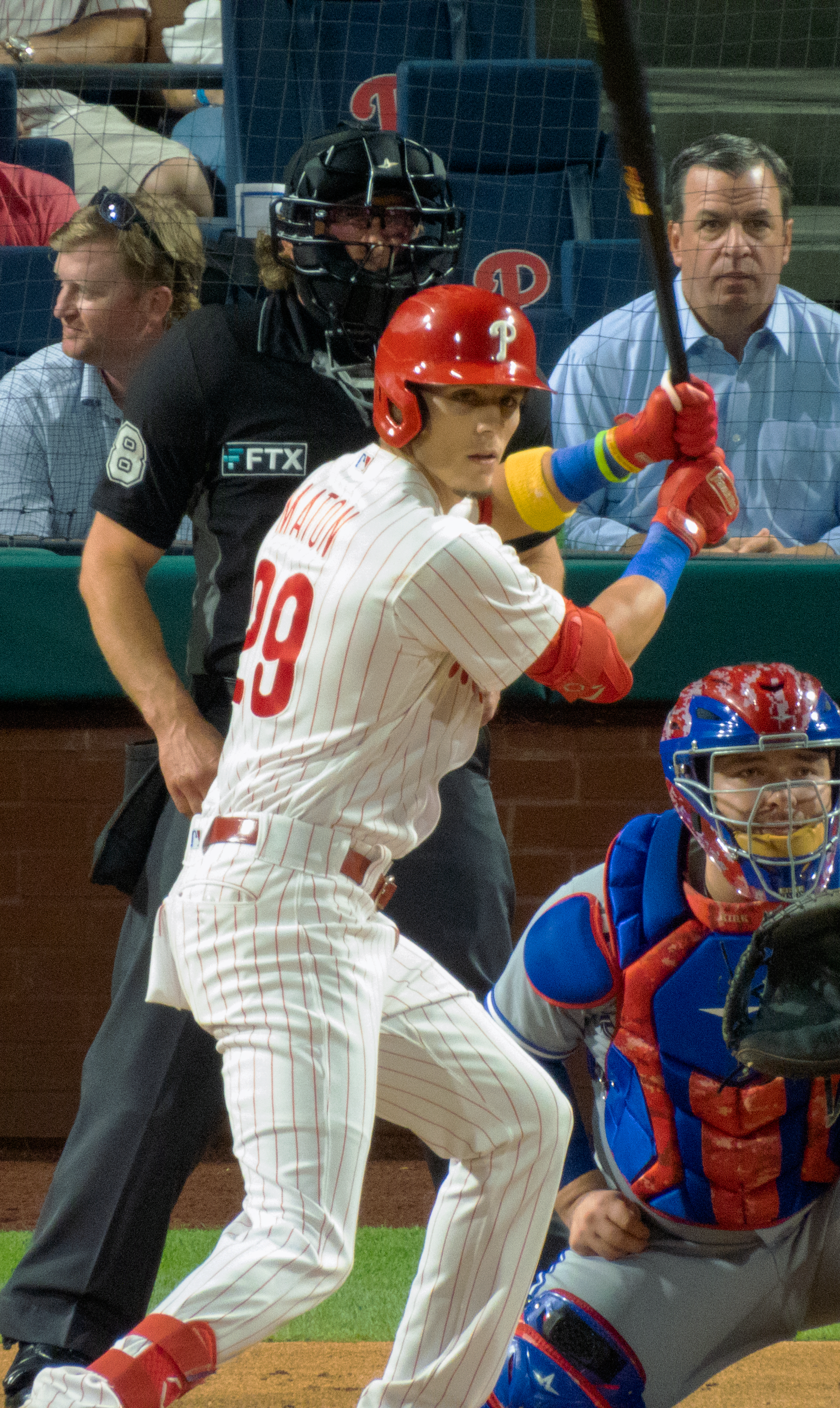
- Maton batting for the Philadelphia Phillies in 2022

Free agent
- Utility player
- Born: February 18, 1997 (age 29); Chatham, Illinois, U.S.
- Bats: Left Throws: Right

MLB debut
- April 19, 2021, for the Philadelphia Phillies

MLB statistics (through 2025 season)
- Batting average: .201
- Home runs: 17
- Runs batted in: 67
- Stats at Baseball Reference

Teams
- Philadelphia Phillies (2021–2022); Detroit Tigers (2023); Baltimore Orioles (2024); Chicago White Sox (2025)

Nicholas Maton (/ˈmeɪtɑːn/ MAY-tahn; born February 18, 1997) is an American professional baseball utility player who is a free agent. He has previously played in Major League Baseball (MLB) for the Philadelphia Phillies, Detroit Tigers, Baltimore Orioles, and Chicago White Sox. Maton played college baseball at Eastern Illinois University and Lincoln Land Community College. He was selected by the Phillies in the seventh round of the 2017 MLB draft, and made his MLB debut with them in 2021.

== Early life and amateur career ==
Maton was born and grew up in Chatham, Illinois, and attended Glenwood High School. He was a four-year starter on the Titans baseball team and was named first team All-State and the Central State Eight Conference Player of the Year as a senior after batting .442 with 28 RBIs, 45 runs scored and 20 stolen bases while also going 8–1 as a pitcher with a 0.95 ERA and 102 strikeouts in 59 innings pitched. Maton was selected in the 40th round of the 2015 Major League Baseball draft by the Oakland Athletics but opted not to sign with the team and instead play college baseball at Eastern Illinois University.

Maton played as the Panthers starting shortstop as a true freshman, batting .299 with 12 doubles, four triples and three home runs with 28 runs scored and 24 runs driven in and was named to the Ohio Valley Conference All-Freshman team. After the season Maton played collegiate summer baseball for the Fayetteville SwampDogs of the Coastal Plain League, where he batted .175 with two doubles and 15 RBIs. He transferred to Lincoln Land Community College after his freshman year. In his only season with the Loggers, Maton batted .408 with eight home runs, 46 RBIs, 60 runs scored and 33 stolen bases while also posting a 4–1 record in thirteen appearances as a pitcher and initially committed to continue his collegiate baseball career at Missouri. Maton was selected by the Philadelphia Phillies in the seventh round of the 2017 Major League Baseball draft and signed with the team.

== Professional career ==
=== Philadelphia Phillies ===
Maton was assigned to the short-season Williamsport Crosscutters to begin his professional career, where he batted .252 with two home runs, 13 RBIs and 34 runs scored and stole ten bases in 58 games. He played for the Single–A Lakewood BlueClaws in 2018, hitting for a .256 average with eight home runs and 51 RBI's in 114 games and was a South Atlantic League All-Star. Maton was assigned to the High–A Clearwater Threshers to start the 2019 season and posted a .276 batting average with five home runs, 14 doubles and 45 RBIs and was named a Florida State League All-Star before earning a promotion to the Double-A Reading Fightin Phils for the rest of the season. He hit .210 with two home runs in 21 games with Reading. After the season, Maton was selected by the Phillies to play in the Arizona Fall League for the Scottsdale Scorpions. Maton was invited to Spring Training by the Phillies in 2020 and was named one of the Phillies top 10 prospects for 2020 by Baseball America. He did not play a minor league game in 2020 due to the cancellation of the minor league season caused by the COVID-19 pandemic.

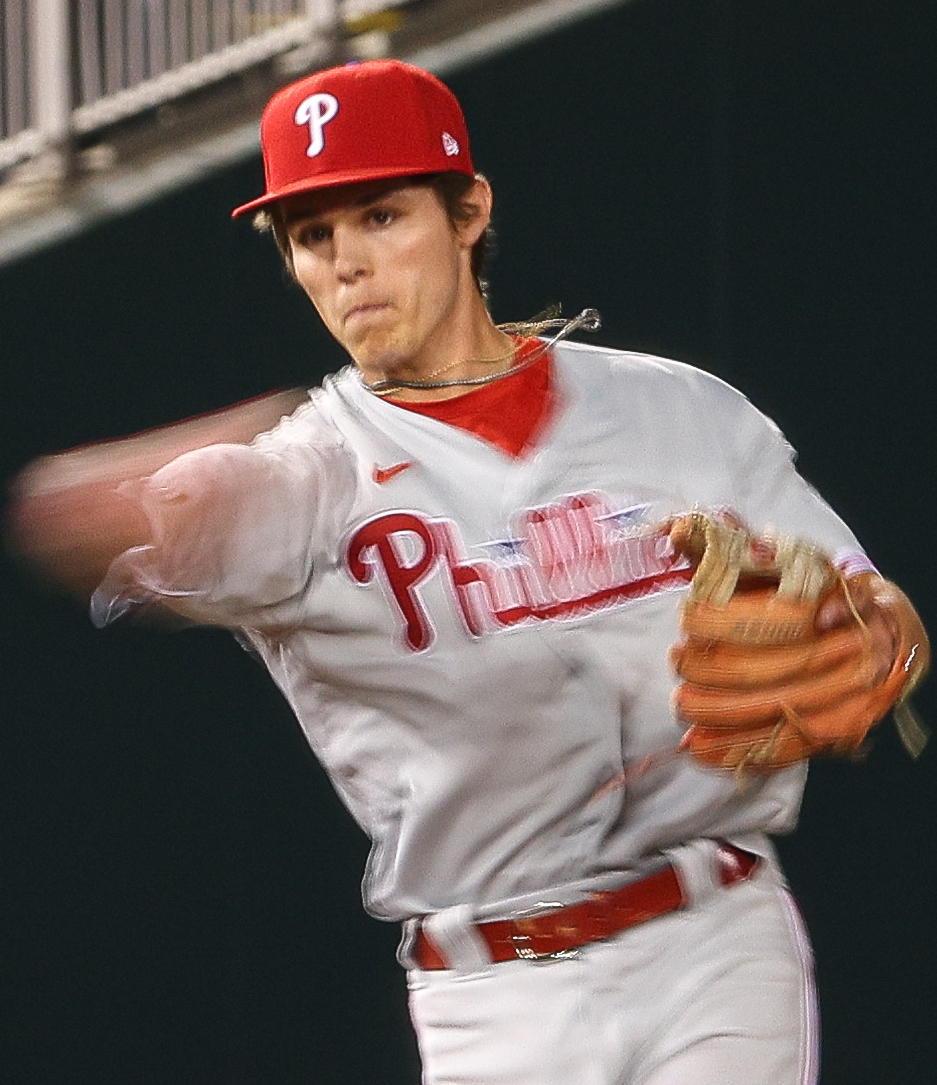
Maton in 2021

On November 20, 2020, the Phillies added Maton to their 40-man roster to protect him from the Rule 5 draft. After being assigned to the team's alternate training site to start the 2021 season, Maton was promoted to the Phillies on April 19, 2021. He made his MLB debut that night as the starting shortstop against the San Francisco Giants, and collected his first major league hit, a single off of Giants starter Kevin Gausman. Maton began his career with a six-game hitting streak, with multiple hits in each of the final four games. He hit the first and second home runs of his MLB career on May 16, 2021, in a game against the Toronto Blue Jays.

On August 23, 2022, Maton recorded his first walk-off hit against the Cincinnati Reds off pitcher Alexis Díaz.

In the 2022 regular season with the Phillies, he batted .250/.341/.514 in 72 at bats with five home runs and 17 RBIs. He played 10 games each in left field, right field, and at second base, and two games each at shortstop, third base, and pitcher. Maton made one post-season appearance during the Phillies 2022 playoff run in Game 2 of the World Series. He was hitless in one at bat as a pinch-hitter.

=== Detroit Tigers ===
On January 7, 2023, Maton, Matt Vierling, and Donny Sands were traded to the Detroit Tigers in exchange for Gregory Soto and Kody Clemens. On April 14, Maton hit his first career walk-off home run against the San Francisco Giants in the 11th inning. The Tigers optioned Maton to Triple-A Toledo Mud Hens following the game on June 25, after he struggled on offense and defense for much of the season. On the year, Maton played in 93 games for Detroit, batting .173/.288/.305 with 8 home runs and 32 RBI. He was designated for assignment by the Tigers on February 5, 2024.

=== Baltimore Orioles ===
On February 7, 2024, Maton was traded to the Baltimore Orioles in exchange for cash considerations. He was optioned to the Triple–A Norfolk Tides to begin the 2024 season but was designated for assignment on March 26 following the signing of Tony Kemp. Maton cleared waivers and was sent outright to Norfolk on March 31. In 41 games for Norfolk, he hit .294/.387/.483 with seven home runs and 28 RBI. On June 19, the Orioles selected Maton's contract to the active roster following an injury suffered by Jordan Westburg. He appeared in one game as a defensive replacement for Westburg, and was designated for assignment following the promotion of Heston Kjerstad on June 24. Maton cleared waivers and was sent outright to Norfolk on June 28. On September 2, the Orioles selected Maton's contract, adding him back to the active roster. In 4 games for Baltimore, he went 0–for–5 with 2 strikeouts. Maton was designated for assignment by the Orioles on September 15. He cleared waivers and was sent outright to Norfolk on September 17. Maton elected free agency on October 4.

=== Chicago White Sox ===
On December 3, 2024, Maton signed a minor league contract with the Chicago White Sox. On March 27, 2025, the White Sox selected Maton's contract after he made the team's Opening Day roster. In 23 appearances for Chicago, he batted .173/.295/.327 with two home runs and four RBI. Maton was designated for assignment by the White Sox on April 26. He cleared waivers and was sent outright to the Triple-A Charlotte Knights on April 28. On May 7, the White Sox selected Maton's contract, adding him back to their active roster. After two appearances, Maton was designated for assignment on May 10. He cleared waivers and was sent outright to Charlotte on May 12. Maton was released by the White Sox organization on June 19.

== Personal life ==
Maton is the younger brother of Chicago Cubs pitcher Phil Maton.
