= Kenneth Boyle =

American lawyer and politician (1937-2000)

Kenneth Boyle (November 27, 1937 – March 11, 2000) was an American lawyer and politician.

Boyle was born in Springfield, Illinois, and graduated from Virden Community High School in Virden, Illinois. He served in the United States Army. He received his bachelor's and law degrees from University of Illinois. Boyle lived in Chatham, Illinois and worked as a special Illinois Assistant Attorney. Boyle served in the Illinois House of Representatives from 1971 to 1977 and was a Democrat. He was elected State's Attorney for Macoupin County, Illinois in 1976. In 1980, Boyle served as the first director of the Illinois State's Attorneys Appellate Prosecutor's Office until his retirement. Boyle died from cancer at the Rush-Presbyterian-St. Luke's Medical Center in Chicago, Illinois.
