= Nokomis High School =

Location
- 511 Oberle St. Nokomis, Illinois 62075; United States
- Coordinates: 39.30450°N 89.29552°W

Information
- School type: public secondary
- School district: Nokomis CUSD #22
- Superintendent: Scott Doerr
- Principal: Rachell McDowell
- Faculty: 18
- Teaching staff: 24.93 (FTE)
- Grades: 6–12
- Gender: coed
- Enrollment: 304 (2023–2024)
- Student to teacher ratio: 12.19
- Campus: rural area small town
- Colour
- Athletics conference: Prairie State
- Nickname: Redskins
- Website: http://www.nokomis.k12.il.us/

Nokomis High School is a coed public high school located in Nokomis, Illinois in Montgomery County serving Community Unit School District 22.

== Student organizations ==
Local Organizations

- Art Club
- Fine Arts Club
- Science Club
- Student Council
- Yearbook

National Organizations

- FFA
- FCCLA
- WYSE
- National Honor Society

== Interscholastic athletics & activities ==
Nokomis High School sponsors teams named the Redskins and Lady Redskins that compete as members of the Illinois High School Association (IHSA) and the Prairie State Conference:

Boys sports

- Baseball
- Basketball (Freshman-Sophomore, JV & Varsity)
- Football
- Golf

Girls sports

- Basketball (JV & Varsity)
- Cheerleading
- Golf
- Softball
- Volleyball

Activities

- Scholastic Bowl

The girls basketball team won the IHSA Class A State Championship in 1997-98 and repeated in 1998–99. Since winning their first Regional championship in 1988. the school has won 7 Regional, 2 Sectional, 2 Super-Sectional, and 2 State titles.

The boys basketball team has qualified for the IHSA State Finals five times, placing 2nd in 2007-08 and 3rd in 2012–13 in the Class 1A State Championships. Over the years since winning its first trophy in 1910, the school has won 4 District, 17 Regional, 5 Sectional, and 4 Super-Sectional titles.

The football team has qualified for the state playoffs 14 times since 1977–78, but has never advanced beyond the second round. They lost in the 2013 first round.

The baseball, softball, and volleyball teams have all won multiple regional titles through the years, but only the 1977 baseball team has advanced beyond the sectional tournament, with that 1977 team losing in the first round of the state tournament.

== Notable alumni ==
- Reid Detmers, Major League Baseball Pitcher

== See also ==
- Native American mascot controversy
- Sports teams named Redskins
