= Phil Maton =

American baseball player (born 1993)

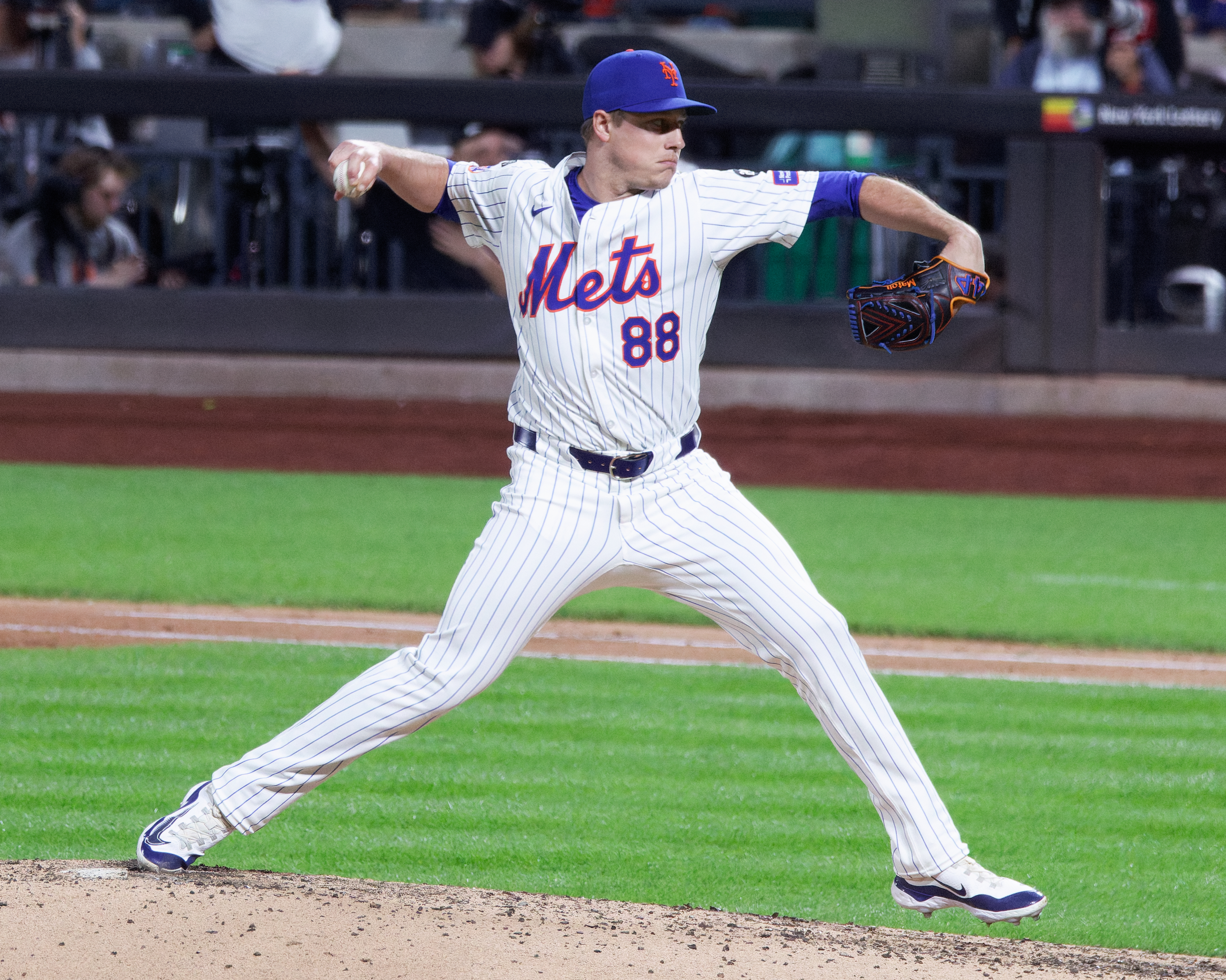
- Maton with the Mets in 2024

Chicago Cubs – No. 88
- Pitcher
- Born: March 25, 1993 (age 33); Paducah, Kentucky, U.S.
- Bats: Right Throws: Right

MLB debut
- June 11, 2017, for the San Diego Padres

MLB statistics (through 2026 season)
- Win–loss record: 23–21
- Earned run average: 4.10
- Strikeouts: 570
- Stats at Baseball Reference

Teams
- San Diego Padres (2017–2019); Cleveland Indians (2019–2021); Houston Astros (2021–2023); Tampa Bay Rays (2024); New York Mets (2024); St. Louis Cardinals (2025); Texas Rangers (2025); Chicago Cubs (2026–present)

Phillip Louis Maton III (/ˈmeɪtɑːn/ MAY-tahn; born March 25, 1993) is an American professional baseball pitcher for the Chicago Cubs of Major League Baseball (MLB). He has previously played in MLB for the San Diego Padres, Cleveland Indians, Houston Astros, Tampa Bay Rays, New York Mets, St. Louis Cardinals, and Texas Rangers. Maton played college baseball for the Louisiana Tech Bulldogs, and was selected by the Padres in the 20th round of the 2015 MLB draft. He made his MLB debut in 2017 with the Padres.

== Amateur career ==
Maton attended Glenwood High School in Chatham, Illinois, and Louisiana Tech University, where he played college baseball for the Louisiana Tech Bulldogs.

== Professional career ==
=== San Diego Padres ===
==== Minor leagues ====
The San Diego Padres selected Maton in the 20th round, with the 597th overall selection, of the 2015 Major League Baseball draft. He made his professional debut that year with the Low–A Tri-City Dust Devils. In 23 relief appearances, Maton pitched to a 4–2 win–loss record, 1.38 earned run average (ERA), and 58 strikeouts in 32 2/3 innings pitched. In 2016, Maton pitched for the Single–A Fort Wayne TinCaps, High–A Lake Elsinore Storm, and Triple–A El Paso Chihuahuas. He made a total of 38 appearances for the three teams, and posted a 5–3 record, 1.74 ERA, and 78 strikeouts in 51 2/3 innings. After the season, he played in the Arizona Fall League for the Peoria Javelinas. Maton began the 2017 season with Triple-A El Paso.

==== Major leagues ====
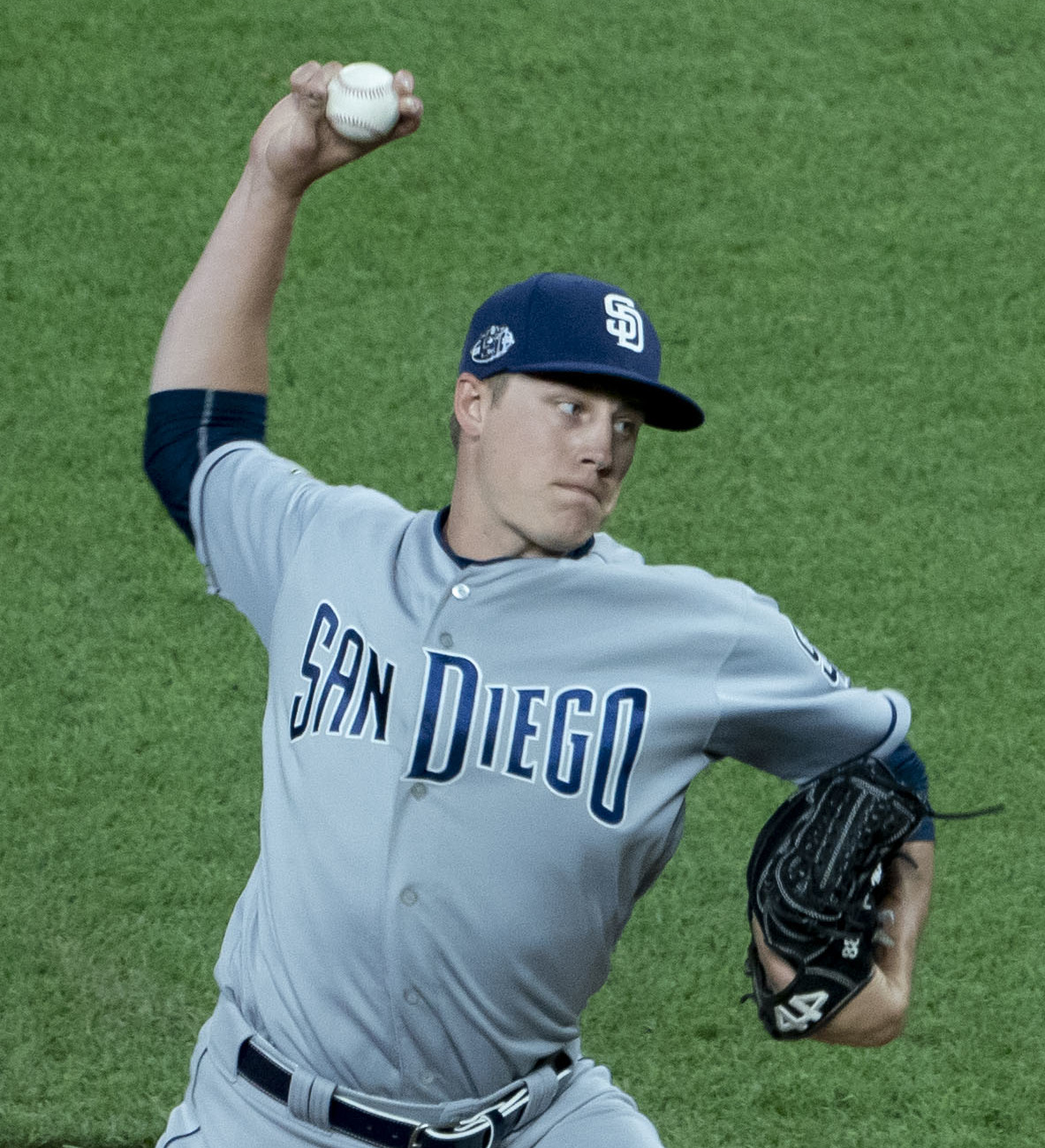
Maton with the Padres in 2019

On June 11, 2017, Maton was called up by the Padres after Jake Esch was designated for assignment. Maton remained with the big league club for the rest of the season, pitching in a middle relief role. He finished the season with a 4.19 ERA and 46 strikeouts in 43 innings over 46 games.

Maton started 2018 with Triple-A El Paso, but was quickly recalled to the majors when Wil Myers went to the disabled list on April 4. On May 13, Maton went to the DL with a strained lat and returned to the team on June 21 after a rehab assignment. He was quickly optioned to Triple-A on June 24, but recalled again on July 9 after posting a sub-1.00 WHIP in six appearances in El Paso. Maton stayed with the Padres for the remainder of the year, again pitching in middle relief. For the season, he had a 4.37 ERA and 55 strikeouts in 47 1/3 innings. Maton's walk rate rose in 2018, and he was less effective after returning from his injury, posting a 0.56 ERA in his 16 innings before going on the DL and a 6.32 ERA with the Padres afterwards.

=== Cleveland Indians ===
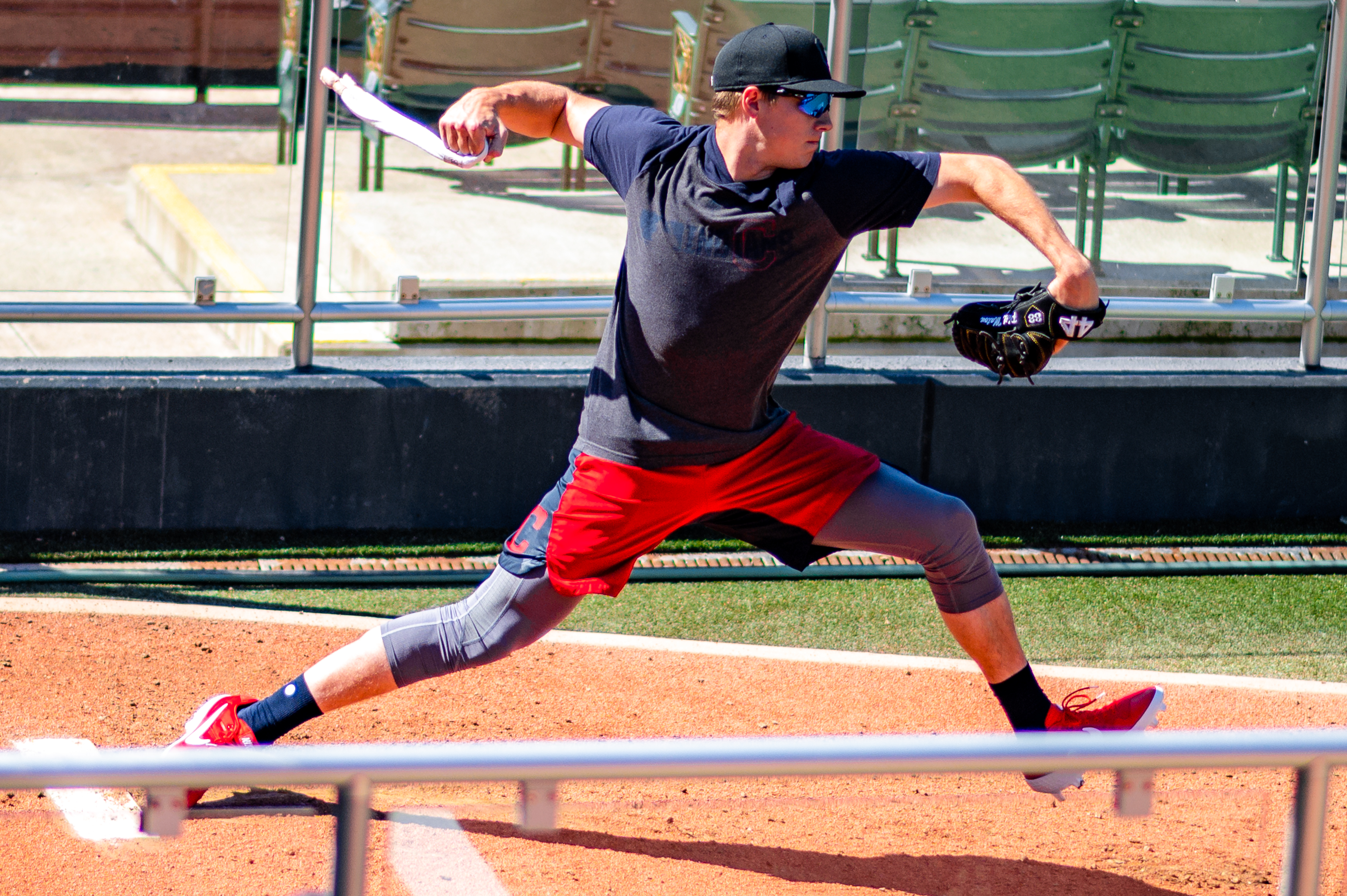
Maton with the Cleveland Indians in 2019

On July 12, 2019, Maton was traded to the Cleveland Indians in exchange for international bonus pool allotments. In Maton's subsequent 9 games with Cleveland, he posted a 2.92 ERA in 12 1/3 innings.

With the Indians, Maton appeared in 23 games, compiling a 3–3 record with 4.57 ERA and 32 strikeouts in 21.2 innings pitched.

=== Houston Astros ===
On July 30, 2021, the Indians traded Maton to Houston Astros along with minor league catcher Yainer Díaz in exchange for outfielder Myles Straw. With Houston in 2021, Maton was 4–0 with a 4.97 ERA. In 27 games, he pitched 25 1/3 innings.

Maton avoided arbitration with the Astros on March 22, 2022, agreeing to a $1.55 million contract for the season. On June 15, Maton threw an immaculate inning in the seventh inning versus the Texas Rangers at Globe Life Field, striking out Nathaniel Lowe, Ezequiel Durán, and Brad Miller. In the second inning, teammate Luis Garcia had also struck out the same three batters for an immaculate inning, making this the first occasion in major league history of two immaculate innings pitched in a single game, on the same date. Maton's immaculate inning was the ninth in team history. In the 2022 season final on October 5, Maton faced his younger brother, Nick, in the major leagues for the first time, yielding a single. After the game, Maton punched a locker, which resulted in a fractured fifth metacarpal area on his right hand. He underwent surgery a day later and was ruled out for the playoffs, although the Astros would still win the World Series, giving Maton his first World Series championship.

On January 13, 2023, Maton signed a one-year, $2.55 million contract with the Astros, avoiding salary arbitration. The Astros placed Maton on the 15-day injured list on August 12, due to a right elbow contusion. He sustained impact of a line drive comebacker hit by Eduardo Escobar during the ninth inning of the game prior versus the Los Angeles Angels.

=== Tampa Bay Rays ===
On February 14, 2024, Maton signed a one-year contract with the Tampa Bay Rays, that included a club option for the 2025 season. In 40 relief outings for the Rays, Maton compiled a 4.58 ERA with 30 strikeouts and 2 saves across 35 1/3 innings pitched.

=== New York Mets ===
On July 9, 2024, the Rays traded Maton to the New York Mets in exchange for a player to be named later or cash considerations. In 31 appearances for New York, he posted a 2.51 ERA with 30 strikeouts across 28^{2}/_{3} innings pitched. On November 4, the Mets declined the 2025 option on Maton, making him a free agent.

=== St. Louis Cardinals ===
Maton with the Cardinals in 2025

On March 13, 2025, Maton signed a one-year, $2 million contract with the St. Louis Cardinals. Maton made 40 relief appearances for the Cardinals, logging a 1–3 record and 2.35 ERA with 48 strikeouts and two saves across 38 1/3 innings pitched.

=== Texas Rangers ===
On July 31, 2025, the Cardinals traded Maton to the Texas Rangers in exchange for Skylar Hales, Mason Molina, and international bonus pool money. In 23 appearances for the Rangers, Maton compiled a 3–2 record and 3.52 ERA with 33 strikeouts and three saves over 23 innings of work.

=== Chicago Cubs ===
On November 25, 2025, Maton signed a two-year, $14.5 million contract with the Chicago Cubs. He made 31 appearances for Chicago, recording a 6.18 ERA with 31 strikeouts across 27 2/3 innings pitched. On August 12, 2026, Maton was diagnosed with a partially torn patellar tendon. On September 9, it was reported that he would require right knee surgery, likely ending his season.

== Personal life ==
Maton's two younger brothers also play baseball: Nick is currently an MLB free agent, and Jacob is a pitcher who was drafted by the Seattle Mariners in the 2018 MLB draft who later played college baseball at Coastal Carolina.

Maton is married to Katelynn Cook, a four-year player for the Louisiana Tech softball team. She graduated in 2016.

Maton grew up a St. Louis Cardinals fan.

== See also ==
- List of Louisiana Tech University people
- List of Major League Baseball pitchers who have thrown an immaculate inning
