= Red Covered Bridge (Illinois) =

- U.S. National Register of Historic Places
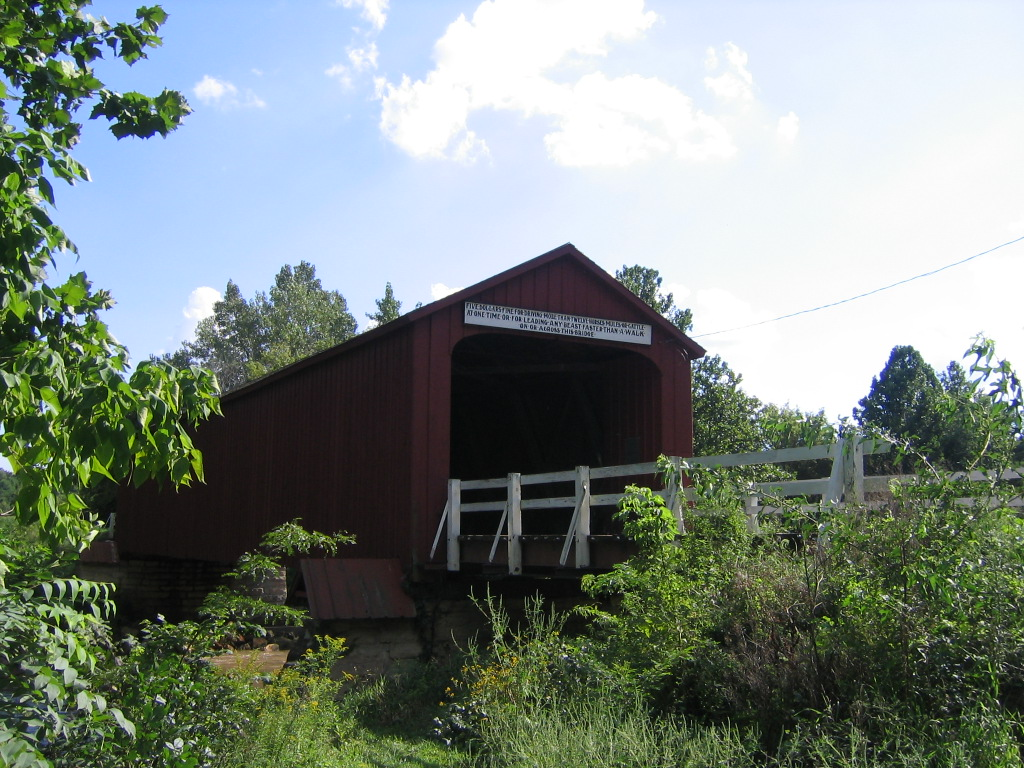
- Shown with its white guardrail
- Location: 2 mi. N of Princeton, IL off IL 26 on Old Dad Joe Trail
- Coordinates: 41°24′59″N 89°28′42.3″W
- Built: 1863
- NRHP reference No.: 75000640
- Added to NRHP: April 23, 1975

The Red Covered Bridge is a wooden covered bridge that runs over Big Bureau Creek north of Princeton in Dover Township, Bureau County, Illinois. It was originally built in 1863, at a cost of $3,148.57. The 149-foot (45 m) span is one of ten remaining covered bridges in Illinois, and it is still open to traffic, though now covered with CCTV cameras. It was once part of the Peoria-Galena Trail.

The bridge was added to the U.S. National Register of Historic Places on April 23, 1975.

In April 2021, a truck driver's GPS routing system sent him through the bridge; the truck caused some damage before he stopped and backed out. Additional height and weight restriction signs were added after the incident. In mid-November 2023, the iconic bridge was severely damaged by a semi tractor trailer crossing and was closed indefinitely for damage assessment and pending future plans.

== Restoration after the 2023 collision ==
During Phase I engineering, the project team used drones to inspect the underside of the bridge without placing additional strain on the damaged structure, consulted restoration carpenters about historic construction techniques, and used computer modelling to assess the bridge's load capacity.

In April 2026, the Illinois Department of Transportation stated that the project had entered Phase II design and plan preparation, with approximately $1 million identified for repairs and safety upgrades.

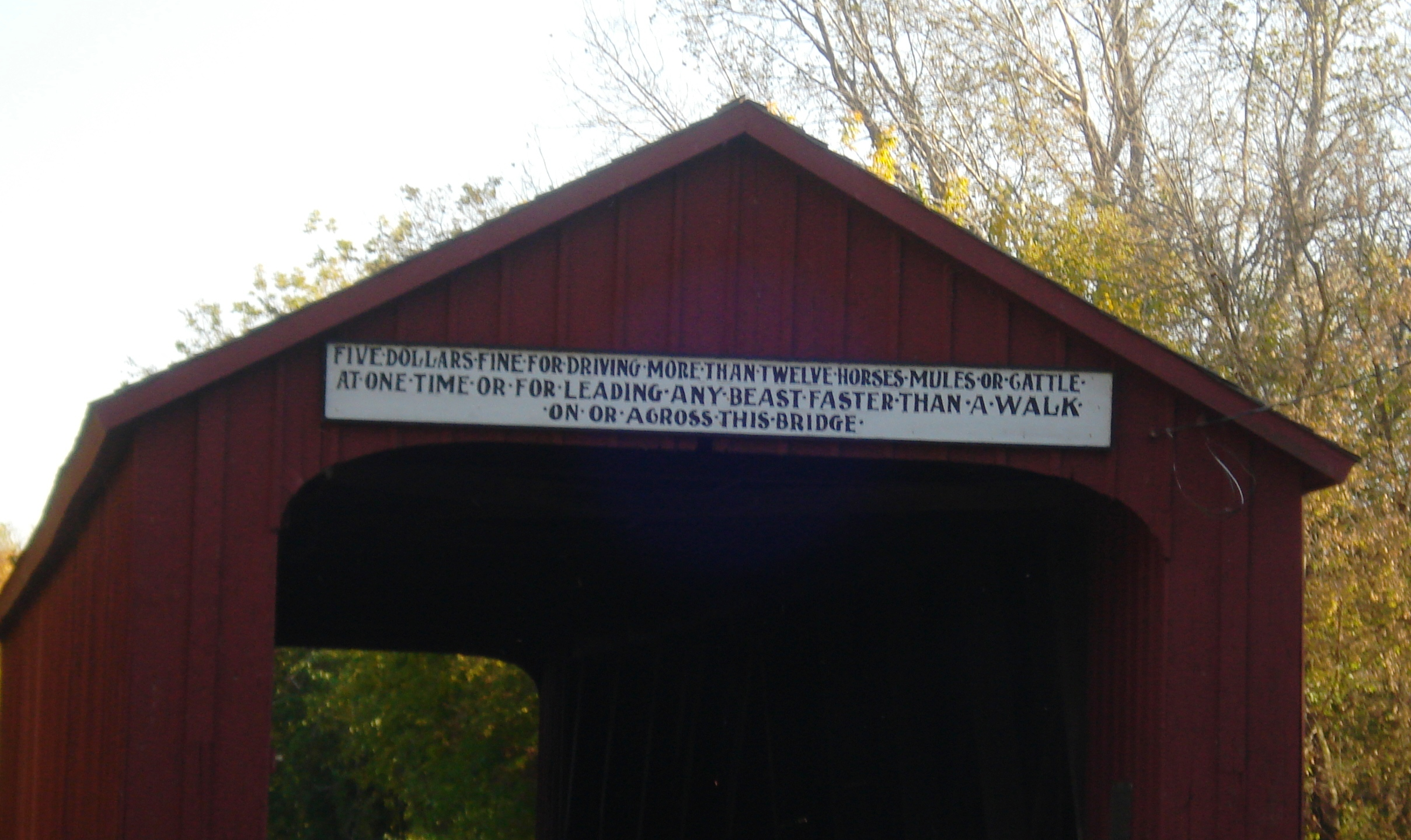
Sign on Red Covered Bridge

== See also ==
- List of covered bridges in Illinois
