= Reid Detmers =

American baseball player (born 1999)

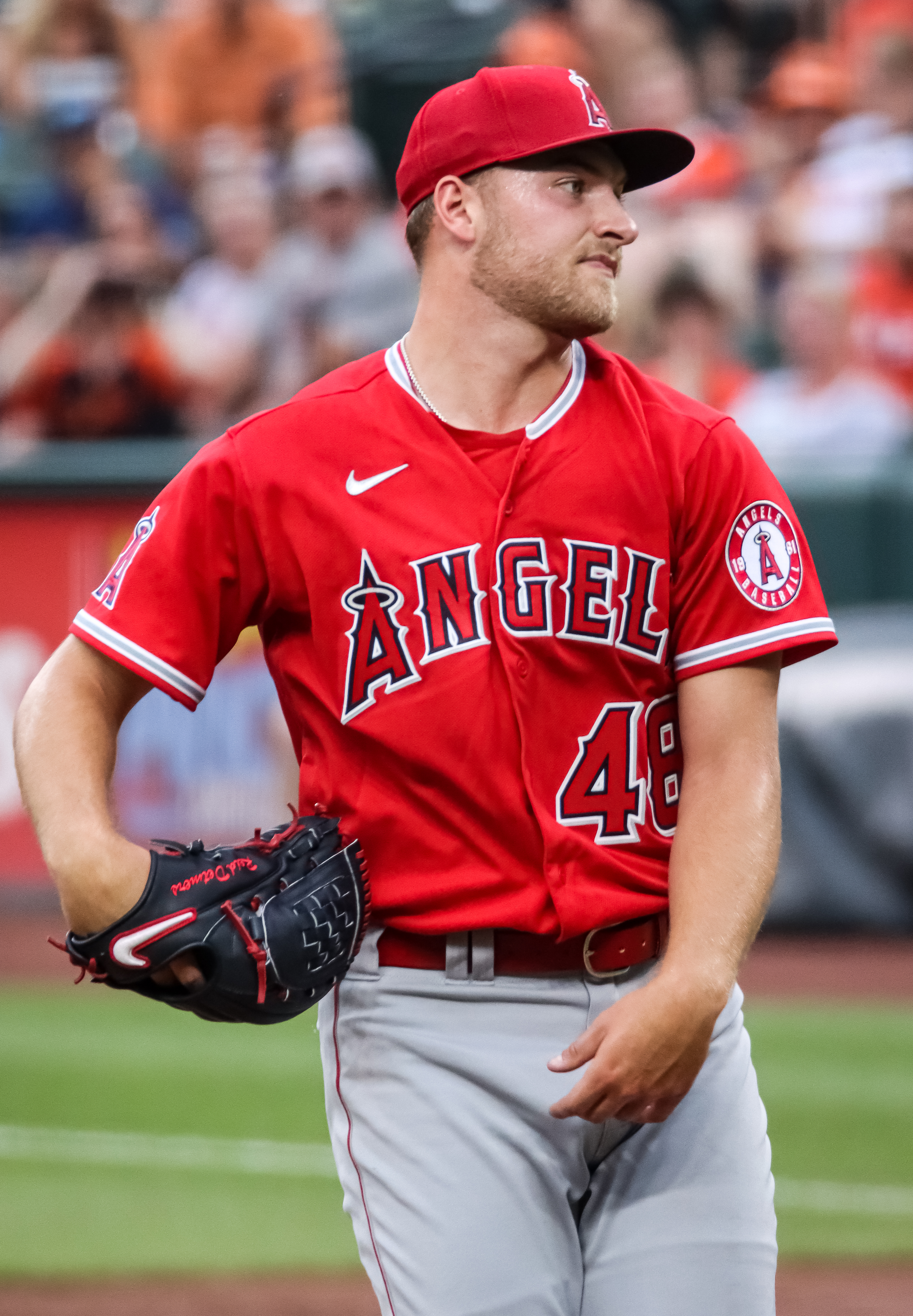
- Detmers with the Los Angeles Angels in 2022

Los Angeles Angels – No. 48
- Pitcher
- Born: July 8, 1999 (age 27); Nokomis, Illinois, U.S.
- Bats: Left Throws: Left

MLB debut
- August 1, 2021, for the Los Angeles Angels

MLB statistics (through 2026 season)
- Win–loss record: 28–39
- Earned run average: 4.36
- Strikeouts: 709
- Stats at Baseball Reference

Teams
- Los Angeles Angels (2021–present)

Career highlights and awards
- Pitched a no-hitter on May 10, 2022; 2× College Baseball All-America Team (2019, 2020)

Reid Kristien Detmers (born July 8, 1999) is an American professional baseball pitcher for the Los Angeles Angels of Major League Baseball (MLB).

Detmers was born in Nokomis, Illinois, and attended Nokomis High School as well as Glenwood High School, lettering in baseball for four seasons between the two schools. He played college baseball at the University of Louisville for three seasons, earning Atlantic Coast Conference and national accolades by his sophomore season. In his junior year, Detmers was considered one of the top prospects for the MLB draft. He was selected tenth overall by the Angels in the first round of the 2020 draft and signed with the team, forgoing his final year of college eligibility.

After pitching only 14 games in the Angels farm system, Detmers was promoted to the major leagues in August 2021. He made the 2022 Opening Day roster with his rookie eligibility still intact. On May 10, 2022, Detmers threw a no-hitter, becoming the youngest pitcher in Angels history to do so. On July 31, 2022, he threw an immaculate inning, joining Mike Fiers and hall-of-famer Sandy Koufax as the only pitchers to throw both a no-hitter and an immaculate inning in the same season, and the only member of the group to do so as a rookie.

== Early life ==
Reid Kristien Detmers was born on July 8, 1999, in Nokomis, Illinois, to Kris and Erica Detmers. Kris was a pitcher who spent several seasons in the St. Louis Cardinals' minor league system and was with the Triple-A Memphis Redbirds at the time of Reid's birth. Reid grew up around baseball, collecting signed baseballs from players that his father was teammates with in the minor leagues. In his childhood, he was a fan of the Cardinals, citing David Freese's performance in the 2011 World Series as a formative moment in his fandom.

Detmers originally attended Nokomis High School. He made the varsity baseball team as a freshman and was named All-Prairie State Conference all three years he was on the team. He committed to attend the University of Louisville going into his junior season over offers from Vanderbilt, Kentucky, Illinois, Indiana, and Missouri. As a junior, Detmers was named first-team All-State after posting an 8–1 win–loss record with a 1.16 earned run average (ERA) and striking out 117 batters. Following the season, Detmers' family moved to Chatham, Illinois, after his mother started a new job and he transferred to Glenwood High School for his senior year. Detmers went 9–1 with a 0.84 ERA and 153 strikeouts as a senior and was again named first-team All-State and was named a Medium School All-American by MaxPreps. Detmers was selected by the Atlanta Braves in the 32nd round of the 2017 Major League Baseball draft, but opted not to sign.

== College career ==
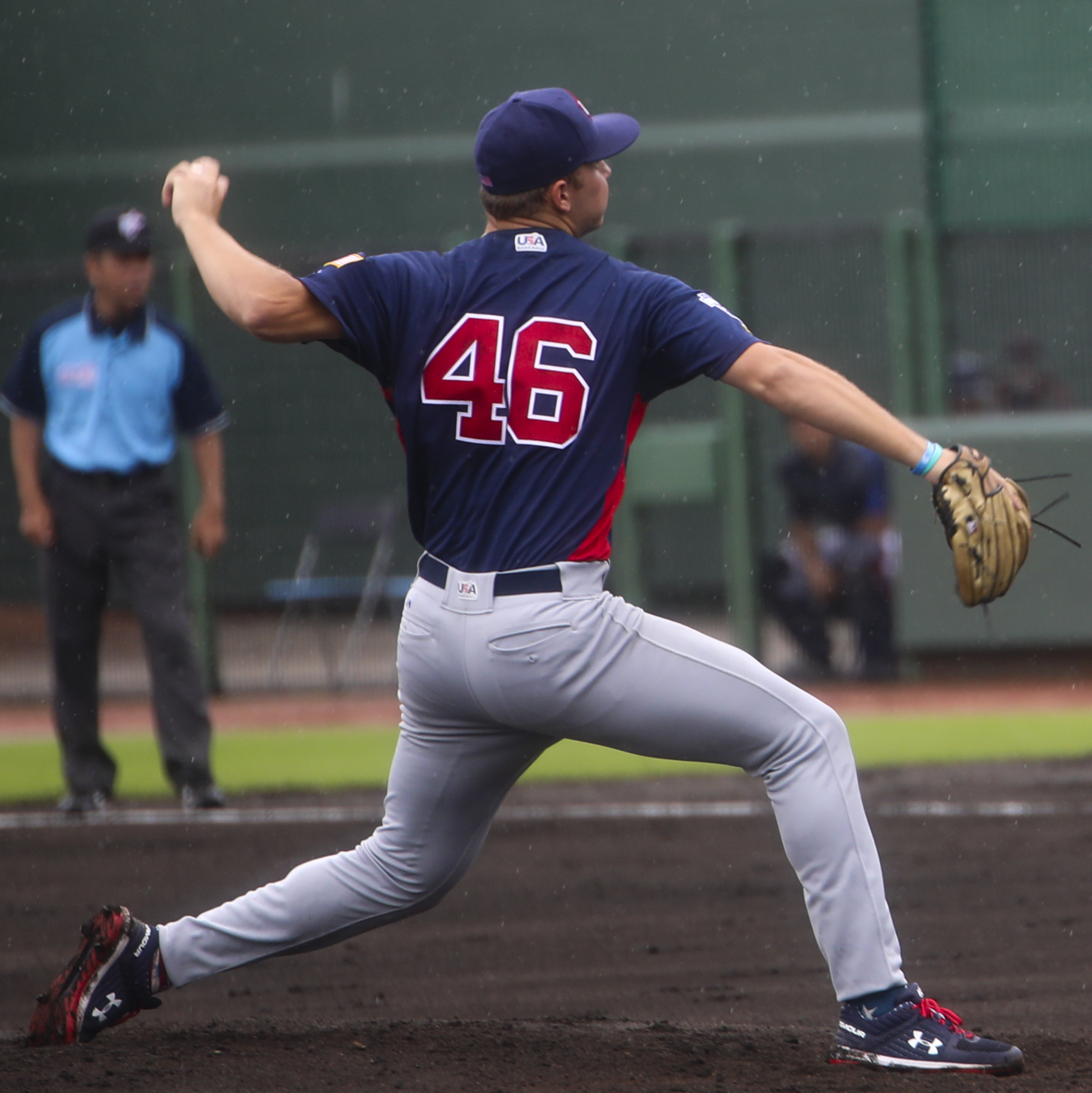
Detmers with the United States collegiate national baseball team in 2019

After graduating high school and forgoing his late-round 2017 draft selection, Detmers honored his commitment to play college baseball for the Louisville Cardinals. He went 4–2 with a 4.85 ERA and 69 strikeouts in 55 2/3 innings pitched as a freshman. He spent the following summer playing for the Brewster Whitecaps of the Cape Cod Baseball League, where he focused on correcting his mechanics. In seven games, Detmers went 1–3 with a 4.55 ERA and 29 strikeouts. He was named East Division MVP at the league's All-Star Game.

Detmers was named the Cardinals' Friday night starter going into his sophomore year. He finished the season with 2.78 ERA and 167 strikeouts in 113 1/3 innings and tied the school record for wins in a season with 13 to four losses and was named the Atlantic Coast Conference's (ACC) Pitcher of the Year, first-team All-ACC, a first-team All-American by the American Baseball Coaches Association and the National Collegiate Baseball Writers Association. In 2019, He was selected for the United States collegiate national team.

Detmers entered his junior season on the watch list for the Golden Spikes Award and as a top prospect for the 2020 Major League Baseball draft. He went 4–0 with a 1.23 ERA and 48 strikeouts in 22 innings pitched before the season was cut short due to the coronavirus pandemic. He was named a first-team All-American by the Collegiate Baseball Newspaper.

== Professional career ==
=== Draft and minor leagues ===
The Los Angeles Angels selected Detmers in the first round, with the 10th overall selection, in the 2020 Major League Baseball draft. He signed with the Angels on June 28 for a $4.67 million signing bonus. Detmers was assigned to the Double-A Rocket City Trash Pandas at the beginning of the 2021 minor league season. In June 2021, Detmers was selected to play in the All-Star Futures Game. He was promoted to the Triple-A Salt Lake Bees after posting 3.50 ERA with 97 strikeouts against 18 walks in 54 innings with the Trash Pandas. In his only start for the Bees, on July 24, Detmers allowed only three hits in six scoreless innings while striking out nine in a 6–0 victory over Las Vegas.

=== Major leagues ===
==== 2021: August call-up, debut ====
On August 1, 2021, the Angels selected Detmers' contract to make his MLB debut against the Oakland Athletics at Angel Stadium. In his first three batters faced, he recorded an out against Mark Canha, walked Starling Marte, and struck out Matt Olson. The first hit Detmers gave up was a Ramón Laureano single in the second inning. He exited the game after 4 1/3 innings, allowing six runs and striking out two batters. Detmers earned his first career win on August 15, 2021, pitching six innings with one earned run and striking out six batters against the Houston Astros. He was the fifth-youngest player to appear in a game in the American League in 2021. Detmers finished his brief 2021 season with a 1–3 record, 7.40 ERA, and 19 strikeouts over five starts.

==== 2022: Rookie no-hitter ====
During spring training in 2022, Angels manager Joe Maddon announced that Detmers had beat out Jaime Barría for the team's sixth starting rotation spot. His turn in the rotation was moved up to the Angels' second game on April 8 against the Houston Astros when Patrick Sandoval missed his scheduled start. On May 10, 2022, Detmers pitched the 12th no-hitter in Angels history, recording two strikeouts and one walk against the Tampa Bay Rays in his 11th major league start. He went 0–2 with a 5.67 ERA over the next six starts after the no-hitter and was optioned to the Salt Lake Bees on June 22. During his time with Salt Lake, minor league pitching instructor Buddy Carlyle noticed an issue with Detmers's mechanics during a 15-minute film session and helped him correct it. Detmers was recalled by the Angels on July 8. In the four starts following his minor league stint, Detmers pitched to a 1.13 ERA, allowing only three earned runs with 31 strikeouts in 24 innings. On July 31, Detmers pitched an immaculate inning against the Texas Rangers at Angel Stadium. Detmers followed Sandy Koufax and Mike Fiers as the third player in MLB history to throw a no-hitter and an immaculate inning in the same season, and was the first to do so as a rookie. Detmers finished his rookie 2022 season with a 7–6 record, 3.77 ERA, and 122 strikeouts in 129 innings across 25 starts. His 2.4 Wins Above Replacement (WAR) was third-best among Angels starting pitchers.

==== 2023: Second full season ====
Detmers was placed fourth in the Angels' starting rotation for the 2023 season, behind Shohei Ohtani, Patrick Sandoval, and free agent signee Tyler Anderson. In his first 10 starts of the year, Detmers went 0–5 and posted a 5.15 ERA. He earned his first win of the season on June 8 against the Chicago Cubs. On June 20, Detmers threw seven innings against the Los Angeles Dodgers, giving up two hits and no runs. Angels manager Phil Nevin said it was the best he had ever seen Detmers pitch and Dodgers pitcher Clayton Kershaw, who also threw seven scoreless innings in the game, said that Detmers pitched better than he did. Detmers threw quality starts against the Chicago White Sox and Arizona Diamondbacks in his next two outings but then posted an 0–4 record with a 10.30 ERA across 25 1/3 innings pitched in six games from July 8 to August 11. On August 16, during a game against the division-leading Texas Rangers at Globe Life Field, he carried another no-hit bid into the 8th inning before surrendering a hit to Marcus Semien with one out. Detmers left the game with 7 1/3 innings pitched, one hit, no runs, and was credited with the win. He finished the season with a 4–10 record, 4.48 ERA, and 168 strikeouts in 148 2/3 innings.

==== 2024 ====
Following the departure of two-way player Shohei Ohtani in the 2023–24 offseason, the Angels returned to a traditional five-man pitching rotation that allowed Detmers and other starters to pitch more frequently. Detmers made his first start of the season on March 31 against the Baltimore Orioles at Camden Yards, pitching five innings and allowing one run with seven strikeouts in the team's first win of the season. Detmers was optioned to Triple-A Salt Lake after giving up five runs to the Seattle Mariners on June 1. He was recalled to the Angels on September 1 after allowing only three runs in his last twenty-one innings pitched.

==== 2025 ====
Detmers pitched primarily out of the bullpen for Los Angeles in 2025, compiling a 5-3 record and 3.96 ERA with 80 strikeouts and three saves across 63 2/3 innings pitched. On September 11, 2025, Detmers was placed on the injured list due to left elbow inflammation. He was transferred to the 60-day injured list the following day, officially ending his season.

==== 2026 ====
Detmers switched back to being a starter for Los Angeles in 2026. On May 24, 2026, after having ceded a career-high eight runs in 5 2/3 innings in his previous start against the Athletics, Detmers recorded a career-high 14 strikeouts against the Texas Rangers, pitching eight innings of one-run ball with no walks in a no decision. On August 3, it was reported that Detmers had been traded to the Chicago Cubs, but subsequent reports stated that no trade had occurred. He started 32 games for Los Angeles during the regular season, compiling a 7–8 record and 3.36 ERA with a career–high 211 strikeouts across 185 innings pitched.

== Pitching style ==
Detmers relies primarily on the four-seam fastball, using it nearly half the time in his first two major league seasons. He also uses a slider, curveball, and changeup as secondary pitches.

As a prospect, MLB Pipeline scouts graded Detmers's fastball at 55, slider at 50, curveball at 60, changeup at 50, control at 55, and overall profile at 55 on the site's 20–80 scale. Detmers struggled with his slider while at Louisville, but credited Angels coaching with helping him adjust the pitch when he entered the organization. Following a mechanics adjustment during a minor league stint in July 2022, Detmers saw improved results with his slider and began using it as his strikeout pitch.

== Personal life ==
Detmers's father, Kris Detmers, pitched for seven years in the St. Louis Cardinals' organization, topping out at Triple-A. He retired from playing baseball at age 26.

== See also ==
- List of Major League Baseball annual shutout leaders
- List of Major League Baseball no-hitters

Awards and achievements
Preceded by Tylor Megill; Drew Smith; Joely Rodríguez; Seth Lugo; Edwin Díaz	No-hitter pitcher May 10, 2022	Succeeded by Cristian Javier; Héctor Neris; Ryan Pressly
