= Mary's River Covered Bridge =

- U.S. National Register of Historic Places
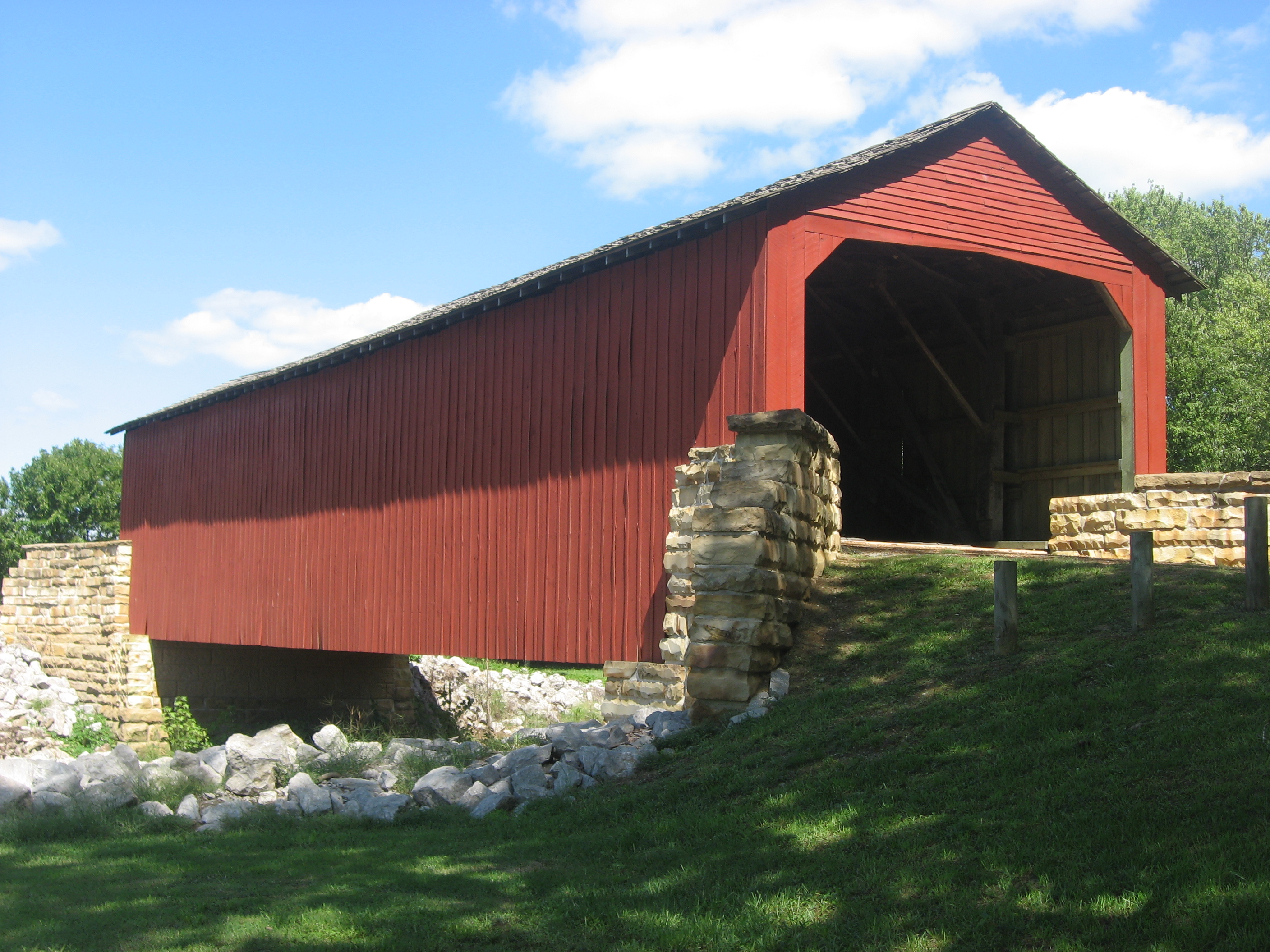

- Location within Illinois Location within the United States
- Nearest city: Chester, Illinois
- Coordinates: 37°56′55″N 89°45′57″W
- Area: 0.5 acres (0.20 ha)
- Built: 1854
- Architectural style: Burr Arch design
- NRHP reference No.: 74000771
- Added to NRHP: December 31, 1974

Mary's River Covered Bridge is a covered bridge which crosses Marys River 4 miles (6.4 km) northeast of Chester, Illinois. The Burr truss bridge is 86 feet (26 m) long and 17 feet 8 inches (5.38 m) wide. The bridge was built in 1854 as part of a plank toll road connecting Chester to Bremen; the bridge allowed agricultural products to be transported to Chester, a significant port on the Mississippi River. In the early 1870s, the toll road and the bridge were sold to Randolph County. The bridge served road traffic until 1930.

In 1936, the State of Illinois assumed ownership of the bridge in order to preserve it. The bridge is now located in a picnic area and park on the south side of Illinois Route 150. It is the only extant covered bridge in Southern Illinois.

The bridge was added to the National Register of Historic Places on December 31, 1974.

== See also ==
- List of covered bridges in Illinois
