= Big Bureau Creek =

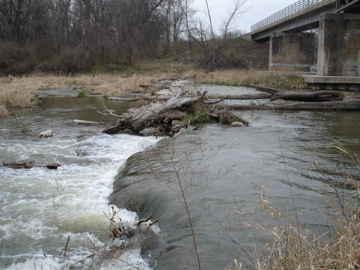
- a rough area of Big Bureau Creek

Location
- Country: United States
- State: Illinois

Physical characteristics
- Source
  - location: Near Compton, Lee County, Illinois
  - coordinates: 41°42′00″N 89°04′11″W
- Mouth: Illinois River
  - location: South of Bureau, Bureau County, Illinois
  - coordinates: 41°14′53″N 89°22′27″W
- Length: 73 mi (117 km)

The Big Bureau Creek is a 73-mile-long (117 km) tributary of the Illinois River in north central Illinois. It rises approximately 10 miles (16 km) north of Mendota and flows southwest into Bureau County, turning south at Princeton and then flowing east into the Illinois River floodplain. Among the creek's more notable features is the Red Covered Bridge, built in 1863, which passes over Big Bureau Creek and was once part of the Peoria Galena Trail. The bridge, located just north of Interstate 80, is listed on the National Register of Historic Places.

== Ecology ==
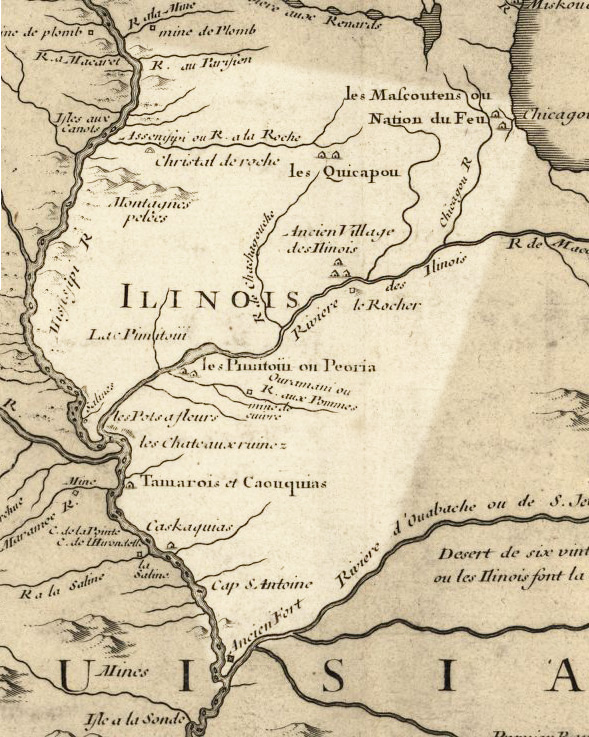
Guillaume de L'Isle's 1718 map, Carte de la Louisiane et du Cours du Mississipi shows la Rivière de Chachagouche, between le Rocher (Starved Rock) and Lake Peoria.

Currently, there is an effort underway to maintain this watershed as well to evaluate its current condition with the Big Bureau Creek Watershed Inventory and Evaluation (I&E) begun in 2003 (See the Forward and Acknowledgment section for the year 2003). Nitrogen levels from surrounding farmland, sedimentation, and low water levels are the main problems to be assessed.

== History ==
The stream is named for Michel or Pierre Bureau. Their original surname was probably Belleau, but local aboriginals may have had difficulty pronouncing the "l" sound. One or both of the brothers ran a trading post near where Big Bureau Creek empties into the Illinois River from 1776 until 1780 or 1790. The stream was called the Chassagauch", "Chassagoach", or "Chachagouche" River on early maps of the region. These are European renderings of the Miami-Illinois language word šaahšaakweehsiiwa, which once meant 'copperhead' (agkistrodon contortrix) but now means 'garter snake'. Šaahšaakweehsiiwa was also the name of a chief and diplomat of the Kaskaskia at the Grand Village of the Illinois, up river from Starved Rock, in the late 17th and early 18th centuries.

== Recreation ==
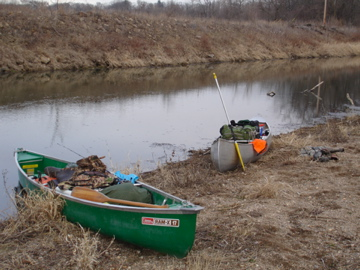
Canoe along the creek.

Most land surrounding the banks of the Big Bureau Creek is privately owned. Canoeing on the creek is possible in some areas. There have been reports of class II and III rapids in high water. Brush buildup, beaver dams, and submerged rocks are always a point of concern.
