= Glenarm, Illinois =

- Unincorporated community
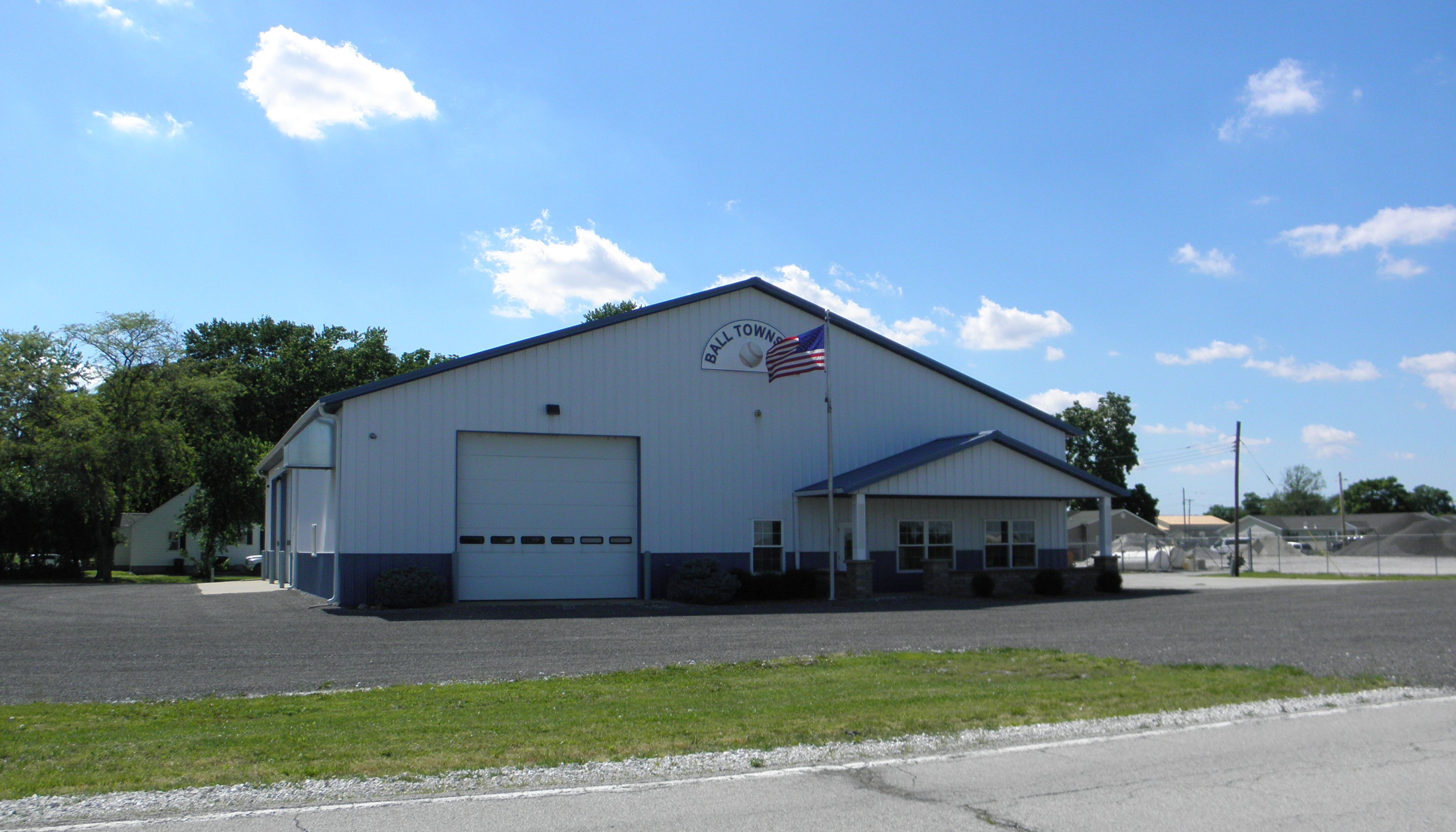
- Ball Township building in Glenarm

- Location within Illinois Location within the United States
- Coordinates: 39°37′25″N 89°38′56″W
- Country: United States
- State: Illinois
- County: Sangamon
- Elevation: 597 ft (182 m)
- Time zone: UTC-6 (Central (CST))
  - Summer (DST): UTC-5 (CDT)
- ZIP code: 62536
- Area code: 217
- GNIS feature ID: 409062

Glenarm is an unincorporated community in Sangamon County, Illinois, United States. Glenarm is located along Interstate 55, south of Springfield. Glenarm has a post office with ZIP code 62536.

== Education ==
Glenarm is part of the Ball-Chatham School District, which includes Glenwood High School.
