= Cotton Hill (Limestone County, Alabama) =

- U.S. National Register of Historic Places
- Location within Alabama Location within the United States
- Nearest city: Athens, Alabama
- Coordinates: 34°44′02″N 86°53′55″W
- Built: c.1830
- Architectural style: Federal
- NRHP reference No.: 14001003
- Added to NRHP: December 10, 2014

Cotton Hill is a historic mansion on a former forced-labor farm in Limestone County, Alabama, U.S. The house was built in the 1830s by William Parham as the main residence and headquarters of Luke Matthews's 1,000-acre plantation. It was designed in the Federal architectural style. The house was listed on the National Register of Historic Places in 2014.
