= Chatham, Illinois =

Chatham
- Village
- Village of Chatham
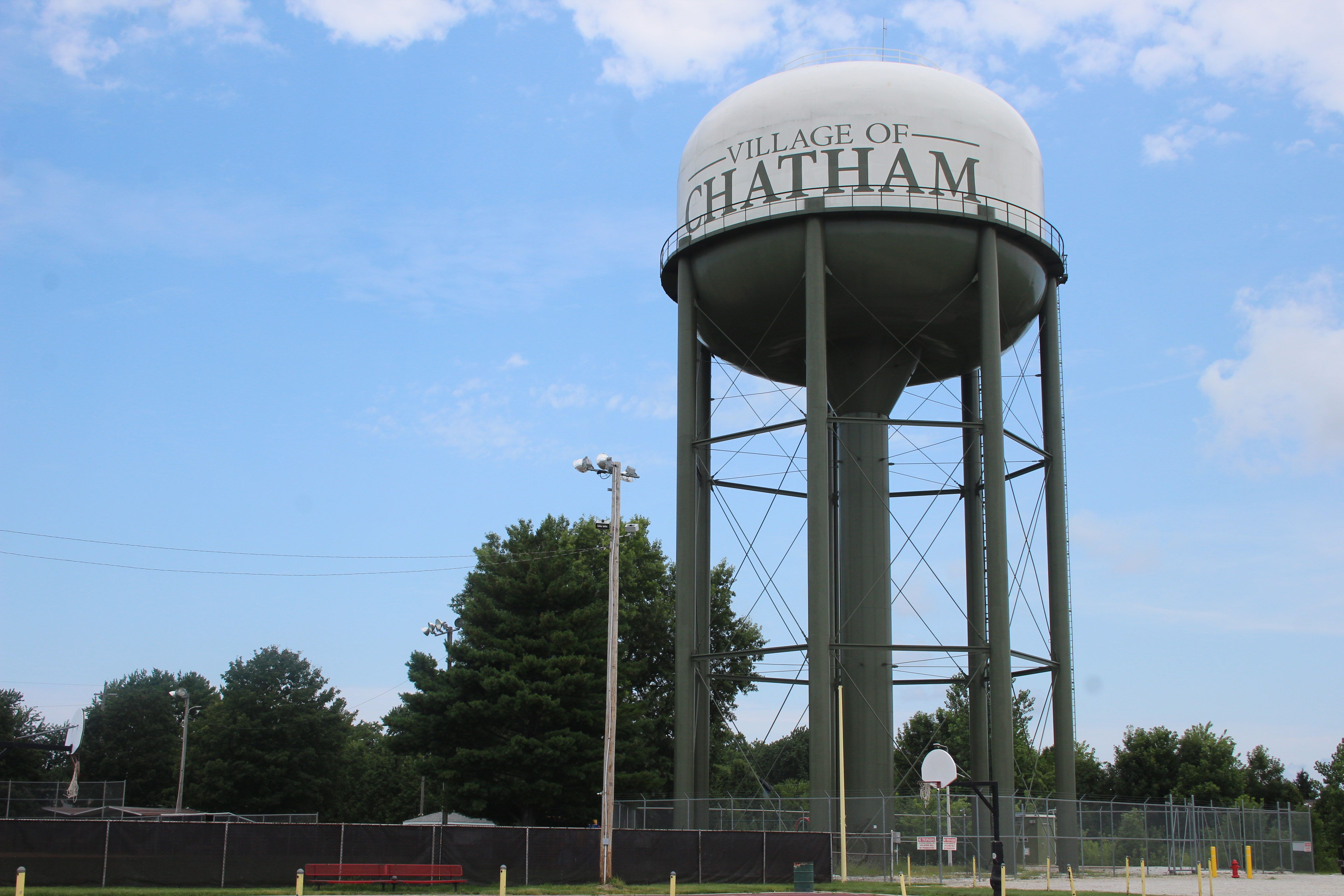
- Chatham water tower at Jaycee Park
- Motto: Where families grow.
- Location of Chatham in Sangamon County, Illinois.
- Coordinates: 39°40′24″N 89°41′36″W
- Country: United States
- State: Illinois
- County: Sangamon
- Township: Chatham, Ball

Government
  - Body: Chatham Chamber of Commerce

Area
  - Total: 7.37 sq mi (19.08 km^{2})
  - Land: 7.36 sq mi (19.07 km^{2})
  - Water: 0.0039 sq mi (0.01 km^{2})
- Elevation: 597 ft (182 m)

Population (2020)
  - Total: 14,377
  - Density: 1,952.4/sq mi (753.83/km^{2})
- Time zone: UTC-6 (CST)
  - Summer (DST): UTC-5 (CDT)
- ZIP code: 62629
- Area code(s): 217, 447
- FIPS code: 17-12684
- GNIS feature ID: 2397606
- Website: www.chathamil.gov

Chatham is a village in Sangamon County, Illinois, United States. It is located 2.8 miles (4.5 km) south of Springfield. The population was 11,500 as of the 2010 census and 14,377 as of 2020. The village lies along the original alignment of historic U.S. Route 66 (Illinois Route 4).

Chatham is part of the Springfield, Illinois Metropolitan Statistical Area.

== Geography ==
According to the 2010 census, Chatham has a total area of 5.722 square miles (14.82 km^{2}), of which 5.72 square miles (14.81 km^{2}) (or 99.97%) is land and 0.002 square miles (0.01 km^{2}) (or 0.03%) is water.

== Demographics ==
Historical population
Census	Pop.	Note	%±
1860	278		—
1880	454		—
1890	482		6.2%
1900	629		30.5%
1910	666		5.9%
1920	848		27.3%
1930	883		4.1%
1940	867		−1.8%
1950	905		4.4%
1960	1,069		18.1%
1970	2,788		160.8%
1980	5,597		100.8%
1990	6,074		8.5%
2000	8,583		41.3%
2010	11,500		34.0%
2020	14,377		25.0%
U.S. Decennial Census

=== 2020 census ===
As of the 2020 census, Chatham had a population of 14,377. The median age was 37.1 years. 28.0% of residents were under the age of 18 and 13.8% of residents were 65 years of age or older. For every 100 females there were 92.1 males, and for every 100 females age 18 and over there were 88.3 males age 18 and over.

97.3% of residents lived in urban areas, while 2.7% lived in rural areas.

There were 5,461 households in Chatham, of which 40.0% had children under the age of 18 living in them. Of all households, 57.4% were married-couple households, 12.3% were households with a male householder and no spouse or partner present, and 24.5% were households with a female householder and no spouse or partner present. About 22.8% of all households were made up of individuals and 8.6% had someone living alone who was 65 years of age or older.

There were 5,839 housing units, of which 6.5% were vacant. The homeowner vacancy rate was 1.7% and the rental vacancy rate was 11.7%.

Racial composition as of the 2020 census
Race	Number	Percent
White	12,350	85.9%
Black or African American	565	3.9%
American Indian and Alaska Native	44	0.3%
Asian	509	3.5%
Native Hawaiian and Other Pacific Islander	0	0.0%
Some other race	110	0.8%
Two or more races	799	5.6%
Hispanic or Latino (of any race)	384	2.7%

=== 2010 census ===
As of the 2010 census, the racial makeup of the village was 93.57% White, 2.47% African American, 0.09% Native American, 1.85% Asian, 0.46% from other races, and 1.57% from two or more races. Hispanic or Latino of any race were 1.97% of the population.

=== 2000 census ===
As of the 2000 census, there were 8,583 people, 3,083 households, and 2,472 families residing in the village. The population density was 1,728.7 inhabitants per square mile (667.5/km^{2}). There were 3,165 housing units at an average density of 637.4 per square mile (246.1/km^{2}). The racial makeup of the village was 97.48% White, 0.77% African American, 0.15% Native American, 0.90% Asian, 0.15% from other races, and 0.55% from two or more races. Hispanic or Latino of any race were 0.77% of the population.

There were 3,083 households, out of which 47.4% had children under the age of 18 living with them, 65.9% were married couples living together, 11.1% had a female householder with no husband present, and 19.8% were non-families. 16.5% of all households were made up of individuals, and 4.7% had someone living alone who was 65 years of age or older. The average household size was 2.78 and the average family size was 3.13.

In the village, the population was spread out, with 32.0% under the age of 18, 6.5% from 18 to 24, 31.7% from 25 to 44, 22.6% from 45 to 64, and 7.2% who were 65 years of age or older. The median age was 35 years. For every 100 females, there were 96.4 males. For every 100 females age 18 and over, there were 90.6 males.

The median income for a household in the village was $60,350, and the median income for a family was $64,257. Males had a median income of $45,543 versus $31,883 for females. The per capita income for the village was $23,167. About 2.8% of families and 4.7% of the population were below the poverty line, including 5.2% of those under age 18 and 5.6% of those age 65 or over.

== Education ==
Chatham is part of the Ball-Chatham School District, which includes Glenwood High School, three elementary schools, an Intermediate School, and a middle school.

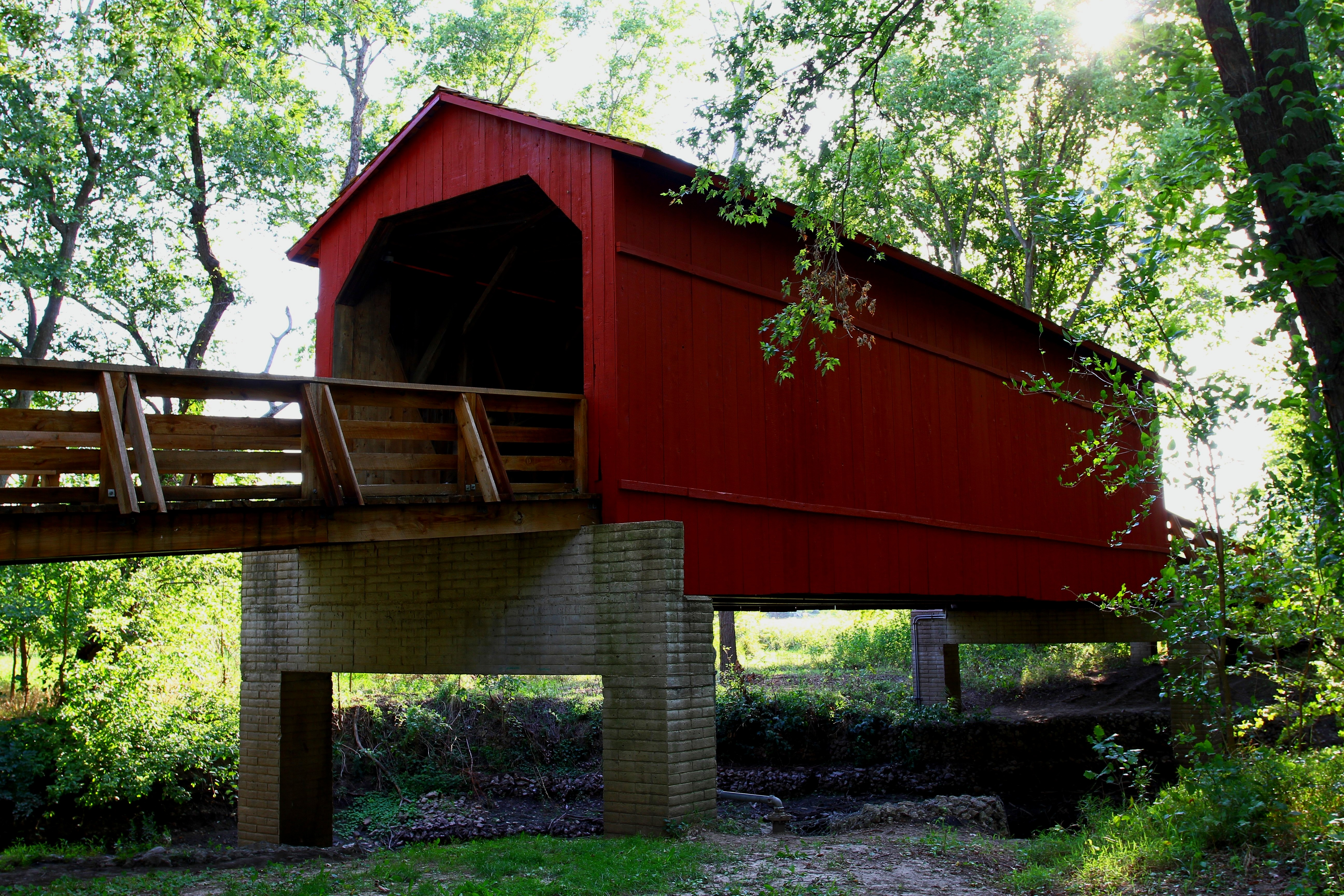
Sugar Creek Covered Bridge

=== Festivals ===
Every June the Chatham American Legion Homecoming Festival takes place in the Chatham town square. Each year in July, Chatham is host to the Chatham Sweet Corn Festival and Illinois Championship Cow Chip Throw sponsored by the Chatham Jaycees. Each year in September Chatham Jaycees host the Octoberfest in the Chatham town square.

== Places of interest ==
- Chatham Railroad Museum (1902)
- Caldwell Farmstead (National Register of Historic Places)
- Interurban Trail, a mixed-use rails-to-trails trail, (Chatham and Woodside townships, 4.75 mi (7.64 km). in length)
- Sugar Creek Covered Bridge is located 5 miles (8.0 km) southeast of Chatham.

== Notable people ==
- Kenneth Boyle, Illinois state representative and lawyer
- Kelci Bryant, Olympic diver
- Reid Detmers, pitcher for the Los Angeles Angels
- Gracie Gold, US and Olympic figure skater
- Phil Maton, MLB pitcher
- Nick Maton, MLB infielder
- Jayson Werth, outfielder for various teams
