= Cowden, Illinois =

Cowden
- Village
- Location of Cowden in Shelby County, Illinois.
- Coordinates: 39°15′02″N 88°51′34″W
- Country: United States
- State: Illinois
- County: Shelby
- Founder: HM Cowden

Area
  - Total: 0.40 sq mi (1.04 km^{2})
  - Land: 0.40 sq mi (1.04 km^{2})
  - Water: 0 sq mi (0.00 km^{2})
- Elevation: 604 ft (184 m)

Population (2020)
  - Total: 515
  - Density: 1,281.5/sq mi (494.79/km^{2})
- Time zone: UTC-6 (CST)
  - Summer (DST): UTC-5 (CDT)
- ZIP code: 62422
- Area code: 217
- FIPS code: 17-17055
- GNIS ID: 2398639

Cowden is a village in Shelby County, Illinois, United States. As of the 2020 census, Cowden had a population of 515.

== Geography ==
According to the 2010 census, Cowden has a total area of 0.4 square miles (1.04 km^{2}), all land.

== Demographics ==
Historical population
| Census | Pop. | Note | %± |
|---|---|---|---|
| 1880 | 350 | | — |
| 1890 | 702 | | 100.6% |
| 1900 | 751 | | 7.0% |
| 1910 | 711 | | −5.3% |
| 1920 | 711 | | 0.0% |
| 1930 | 616 | | −13.4% |
| 1940 | 709 | | 15.1% |
| 1950 | 619 | | −12.7% |
| 1960 | 575 | | −7.1% |
| 1970 | 537 | | −6.6% |
| 1980 | 623 | | 16.0% |
| 1990 | 599 | | −3.9% |
| 2000 | 612 | | 2.2% |
| 2010 | 629 | | 2.8% |
| 2020 | 515 | | −18.1% |
U.S. Decennial Census

As of the census of 2000, there were 650 people, 238 households, and 159 families residing in the village. The population density was 1,526.3 inhabitants per square mile (589.3/km^{2}). There were 270 housing units at an average density of 673.4 per square mile (260.0/km^{2}). The racial makeup of the village was 98.04% White, 0.49% African American, and 1.47% from two or more races.

There were 238 households, out of which 33.2% had children under the age of 18 living with them, 52.1% were married couples living together, 13.0% had a female householder with no husband present, and 32.8% were non-families. 31.1% of all households were made up of individuals, and 15.1% had someone living alone who was 65 years of age or older. The average household size was 2.57 and the average family size was 3.21.

In the village, the population was spread out, with 30.6% under the age of 18, 9.2% from 18 to 24, 26.0% from 25 to 44, 19.1% from 45 to 64, and 15.2% who were 65 years of age or older. The median age was 33 years. For every 100 females, there were 88.9 males. For every 100 females age 18 and over, there were 84.0 males.

The median income for a household in the village was $25,938, and the median income for a family was $32,059. Males had a median income of $31,307 versus $24,792 for females. The per capita income for the village was $12,583. About 16.3% of families and 19.8% of the population were below the poverty line, including 30.6% of those under age 18 and 18.3% of those age 65 or over.
