= Cotton Hill Township, Sangamon County, Illinois =

Coordinates: 39°39′34″N 89°32′41″W

Cotton Hill Township
- Township
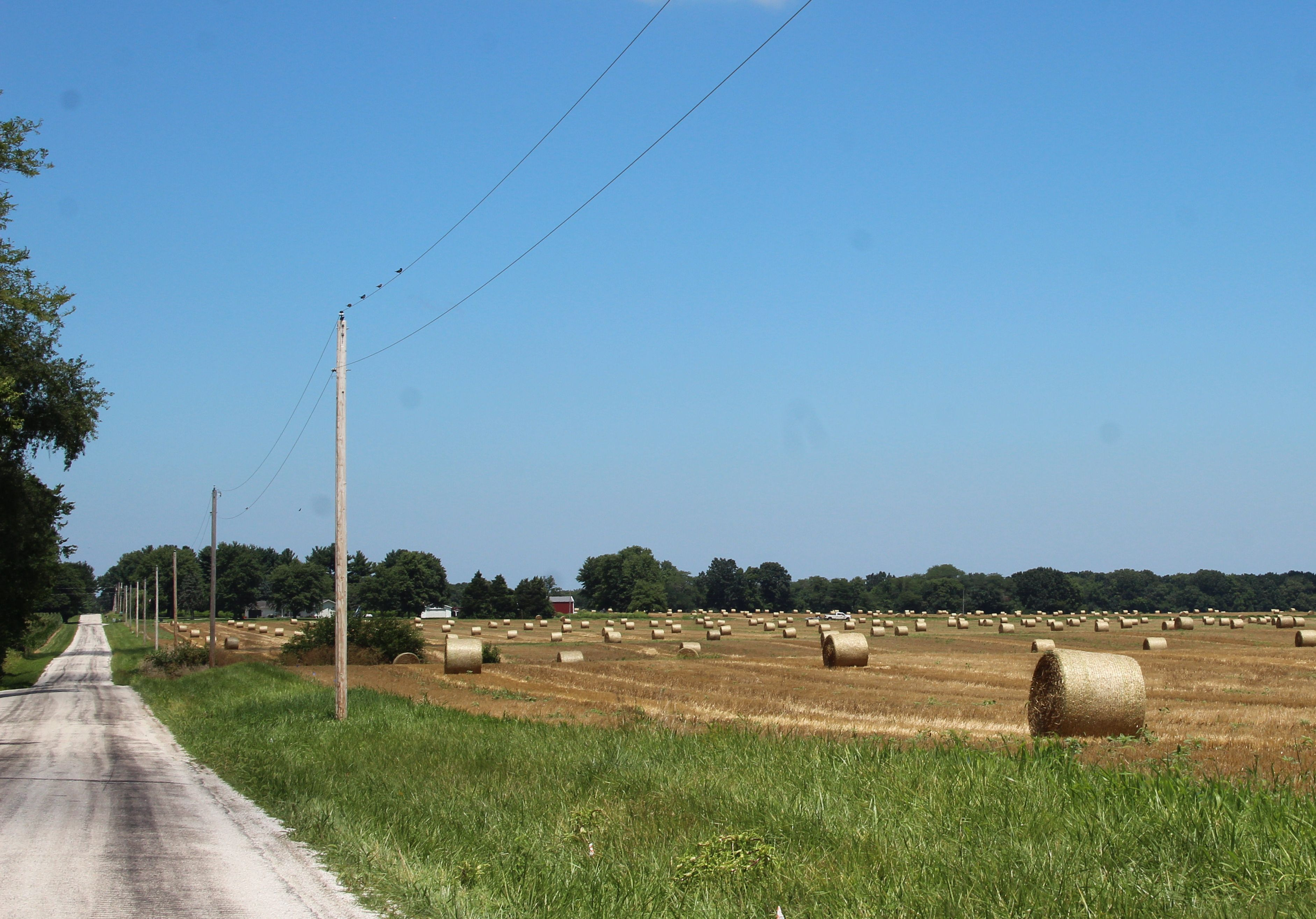
- A township road on Cotton Hill

- Location in Sangamon County

- Sangamon County's location in Illinois
- Country: United States
- State: Illinois
- County: Sangamon
- Established: November 6, 1860

Area
  - Total: 30.18 sq mi (78.2 km^{2})
  - Land: 29.82 sq mi (77.2 km^{2})
  - Water: 0.36 sq mi (0.93 km^{2}) 1.19%

Population (2010)
  - Estimate (2016): 890
  - Density: 30.2/sq mi (11.7/km^{2})
- Time zone: UTC-6 (CST)
  - Summer (DST): UTC-5 (CDT)
- FIPS code: 17-167-16574

Cotton Hill Township is located in Sangamon County, Illinois. As of the 2010 census, its population was 902 and it contained 389 housing units. The township is the home of Hunter Lake, a proposed 3,010-acre (12.2 km^{2}) reservoir.

== Geography ==
According to the 2010 census, the township has a total area of 30.18 square miles (78.2 km^{2}), of which 29.82 square miles (77.2 km^{2}) (or 98.81%) is land and 0.36 square miles (0.93 km^{2}) (or 1.19%) is water.

== Demographics ==
Cotton Hill Township population
Census	Pop.	Note	%±
2016 (est.)	890
