= Amboy station =

- Amboy Illinois Central Depot
- U.S. National Register of Historic Places
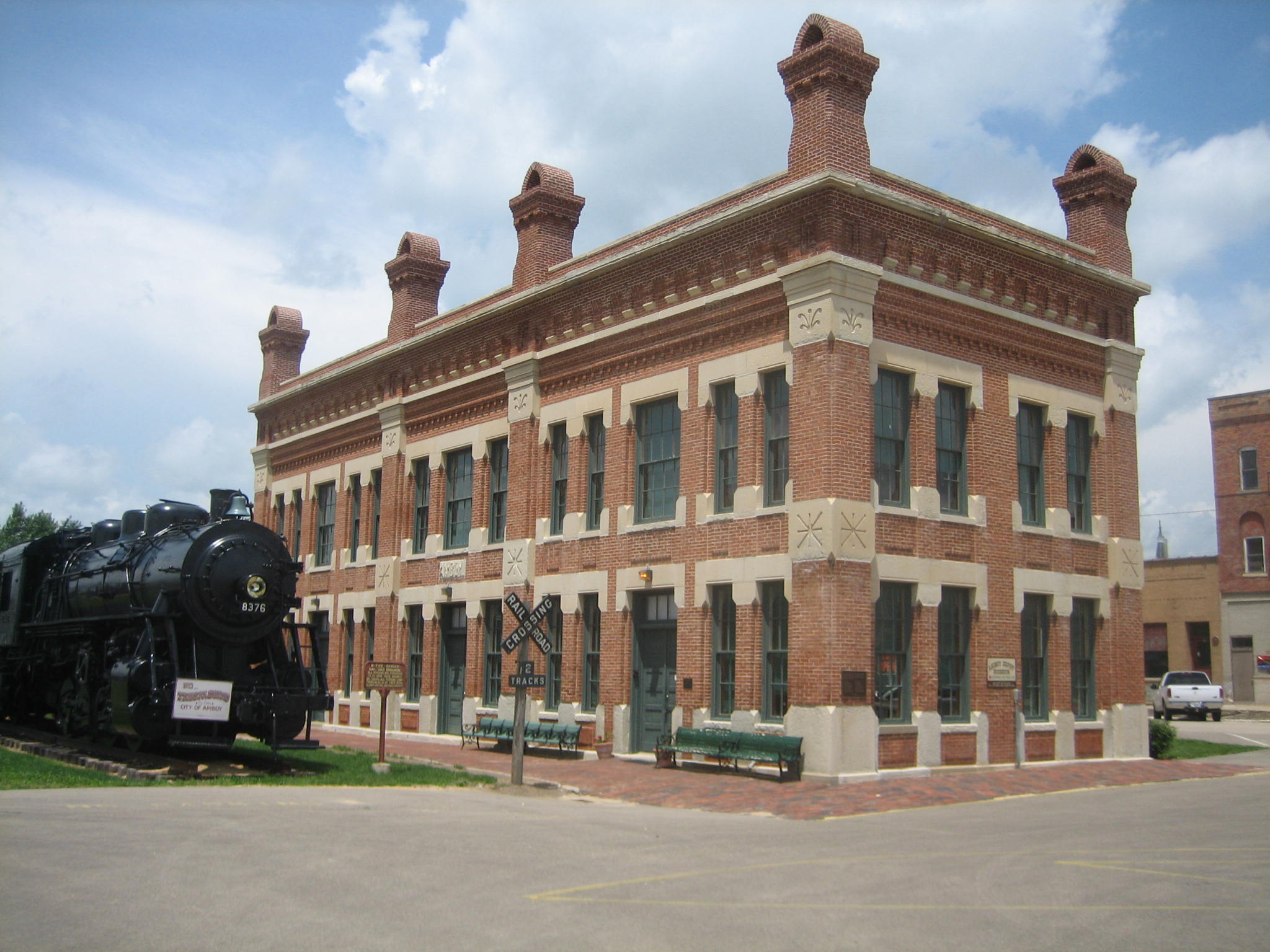

- Location within Illinois Location within the United States
- Location: 50 South East Avenue, Amboy, Illinois
- Coordinates: 41°42′51″N 89°19′56″W
- Area: less than one acre (4,000 m^{2})
- Built: 1876
- Architect: James Nocquet
- Architectural style: Italianate
- NRHP reference No.: 92001015
- Added to NRHP: August 18, 1992

Amboy station is a former rail station in the city of Amboy, Lee County, Illinois, United States. The building was constructed as a headquarters building for the Illinois Central Railroad as well as a public train station for the fledgling city of Amboy in 1876. It was designed by railroad staff architect James Nocquet after a fire destroyed the original Illinois Central offices on the site. The building was added to the U.S. National Register of Historic Places in 1992 as the Amboy Illinois Central Depot.

The rectangular, Italianate building operated as Illinois Central Railroad's Northern Division headquarters until 1894. After 1894 the rail line through Amboy was downgraded in importance by the railroad and the division headquarters moved elsewhere. Today the depot is operated as a public museum. The museum grounds include the depot, which houses artifacts and exhibits and several outbuildings. Also on the property is a steam locomotive which, in 1976, was the last steam engine in the United States to be commissioned for regular freight service. The locomotive was obtained from the now defunct Northwestern Steel and Wire company and is maintained as a static display.

== History ==
The Amboy Illinois Central Depot was constructed in 1876 within the right-of-way for the Illinois Central Railroad. When the Illinois Central was authorized by a Stephen A. Douglas-sponsored act of Congress on September 20, 1854, it was to be the largest railroad company on earth. The act authorized a mainline from Dunleith (later East Dubuque) to Cairo and branch lines from Centralia to Chicago. Based upon the length of the divisions, Illinois Central's division headquarters was to be built in Lee County.

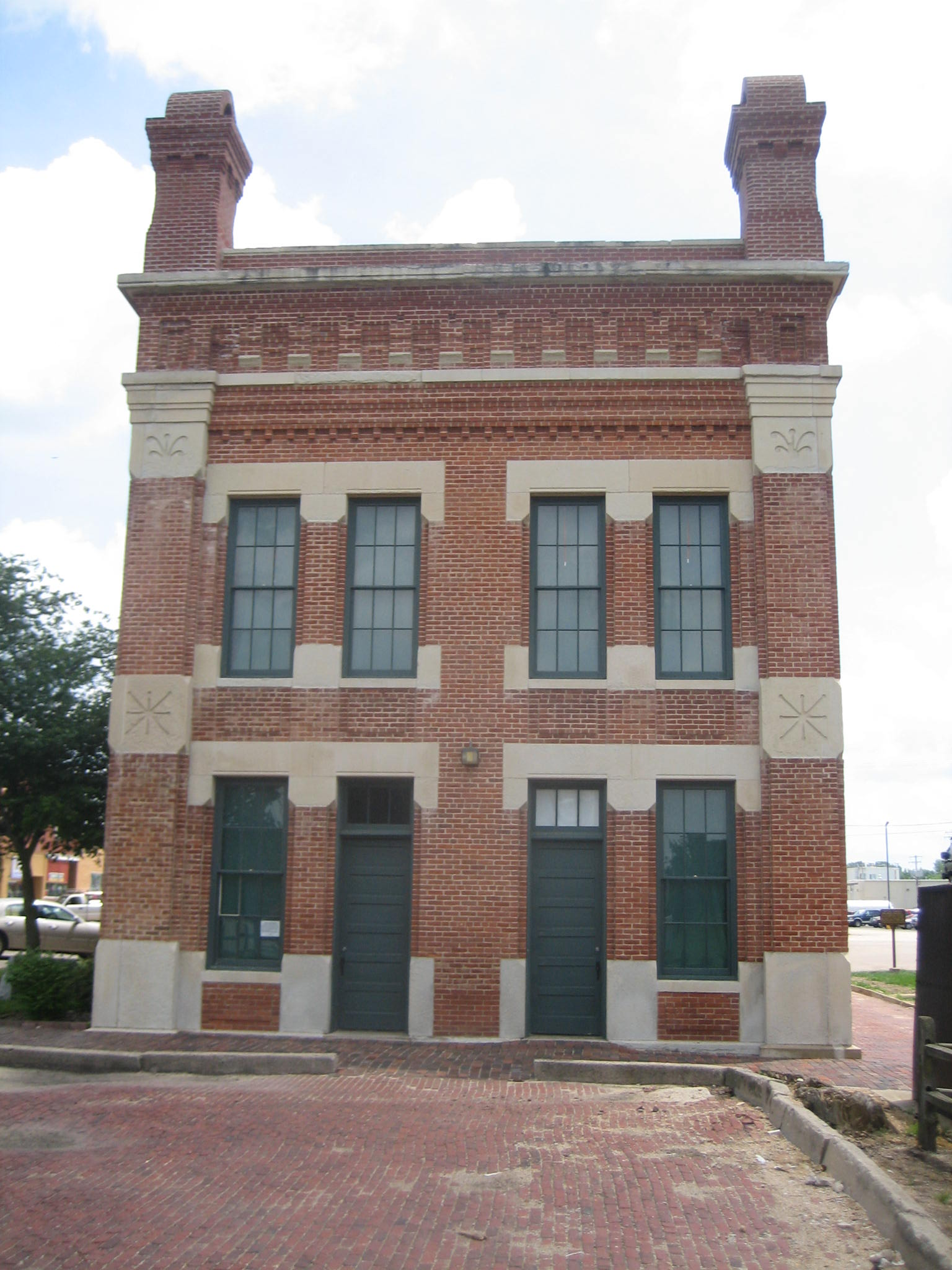
The Amboy Depot from its rear facade.

The railroad purchased land in the present-day city of Amboy and set up division headquarters operations as well as shop and maintenance operations. The city of Amboy was founded around Illinois Central's activity in the area. Over the next twenty years operations for the railroad's northern division were still led from the original division headquarters even as railroad activity continued to increase. The original building was enlarged in 1863, though accounts still portrayed the structure as too small for the needs of the railroad at the time. On November 15, 1875, the division headquarters building and the adjacent hotel/depot were destroyed by fire.

After the fire the railroad decided to raze the remains of the old structure and construct a new combined depot and division headquarters, leaving hotel functions to other private entrepreneurs. The burned out site was cleared and in 1876 the current Amboy Illinois Central Depot was built. Railroad management was carried out by designating divisions which had autonomous control over hundreds of miles of track, the building in Amboy was one such division headquarters. By the time the Amboy Illinois Central Depot was completed in 1876 the entire 345-mile (555 km) stretch of track from Centralia to East Dubuque was consolidated within the Illinois Central Northern Division, operated out of the Amboy building. The Amboy division headquarters had authority of 53 individual train stations.

Operations at the Amboy headquarters and depot continued in this manner until 1894. That year, Illinois Central completed an assessment of the effects of the completion of a new east-west rail line from Iowa to Chicago. Completion of the east-west line had shifted rail traffic from the north-south route through Amboy. The result was fewer scheduled passenger trains and less cargo rolling through Amboy and the railroad decided to downgrade the section of track from Freeport to Centralia (including Amboy) to a sub-division. The headquarters in Amboy were closed and the locomotive repair and maintenance facilities were mostly abandoned and relocated to Freeport, Illinois, and Clinton, Illinois.

After the division headquarters moved, the depot still carried out railroad functions; the building still served as a crew change location as well as the depot for the village of Amboy. The second floor was mostly abandoned after 1894 while the first floor handled the bulk of the day-to-day operations. As cars and buses became more popular Amboy's need for rail service could be served by the station in Dixon; passenger service to Amboy was discontinued in 1939 and the depot underwent an extensive remodeling. Operations were once again moved about the building. The northwest half of the first floor was transformed into a storage area and the second floor renovated into apartments for the station agent and employees of the nearby Green River Ordnance Plant. The station remained the transfer point for all ammunition made at the hastily constructed ammunition plant throughout World War II and the Korean War.

The mid-1980s brought the end of the Amboy Illinois Central Depot's days as an active rail building. On June 10, 1984, the Illinois Commerce Commission authorized the Illinois Central Railroad to decommission the rail line through Amboy. The railroad announced it intended to demolish the old station. The building, which is owned by a committee from the Village of Amboy, was saved by a citizens group and converted into a museum.

== Architecture ==
The Amboy Illinois Central Depot was designed by railroad staff architect James Nocquet in the Italianate style of architecture. Before Nocquet was employed by Illinois Central he worked in a Chicago architectural firm, Meriam and Nocquet. In 1871 he took his position with the railroad and remained in their employ through the 1870s, including during the time he designed the Amboy depot. The building was designed to be a spacious and modern division headquarters while doubling as a depot for the citizens of Amboy; the southeastern half of the first floor was designed for such use. The depot section consists of waiting rooms and ticketing counters typical of their era while the headquarters portion of the building is well illuminated through ample fenestration.

The rectangular-shaped building measures 32 feet (9.8 m) by 88 feet (27 m) and its exterior architecture demonstrates its importance to the Illinois Central Railroad. Constructed of red brick with extensive limestone detailing, the depot's size, height, and ornate brick/stone detailing combine to give it an imposing and elegant character.

== Amboy Depot Museum ==
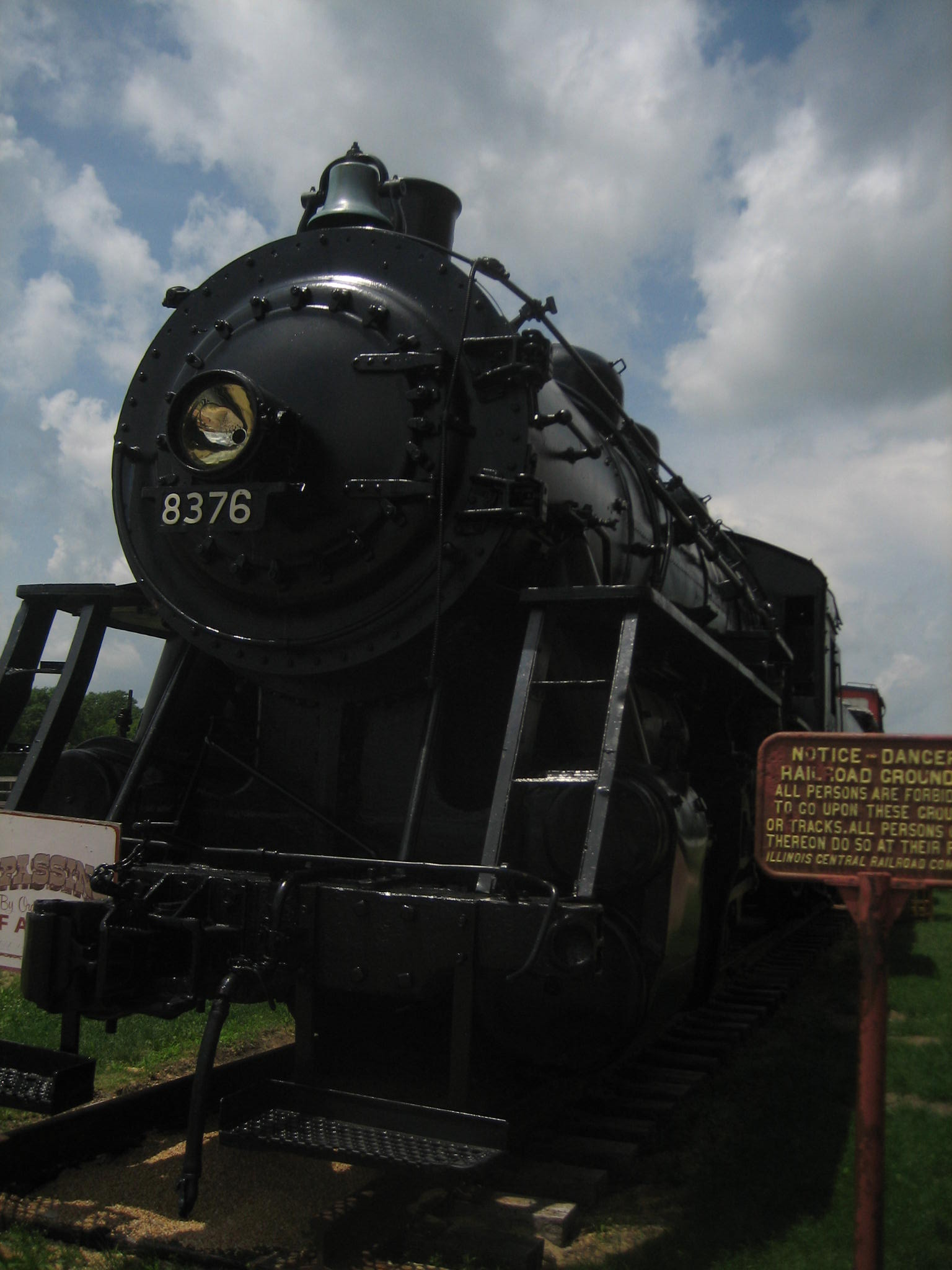
NS&W #76, the last steam locomotive commissioned for regular freight service in the United States.

The Amboy Depot Museum has operated on the site since 2003. The museum encompasses much of the former rail yard that Illinois Central maintained at Amboy's Northern Division Headquarters for its Cairo to East Dubuque line. When the line was completed in 1855 it was the longest rail line in the world. The museum consists of three buildings with the Amboy Illinois Central Depot being its primary structure. Inside are exhibits and artifacts relating to the history of Amboy and Illinois Central Railroad. Palmer School is a restored one-room schoolhouse that was relocated to museum property during the 1990s from its original location west of Amboy. The other structure is the Amboy Illinois Central Freight House which was relocated to museum property in 2003 to prevent its planned demolition.

Amboy Illinois Central Depot has a static steam locomotive display on its property, the locomotive sits on unconnected railroad tracks adjacent the Depot. The locomotive is an 0-8-0 steam engine built in 1929 by Baldwin Locomotive Works as a switcher bearing the number 8376. It was originally operated by the Grand Trunk Western Railroad. Switcher #8376 (8376) was retired from service near Detroit, Michigan, in 1958 and sold as scrap. The now-defunct Northwestern Steel and Wire company, in Sterling, Illinois, ended up with 8376 and other steam locomotives, and instead of melting them down the company renovated them. The company then used them to replace their aging internal locomotives, used within the steel mill grounds. Thus, 8376 was brought out of storage and recommissioned in 1976 as NS&W #76. When it was christened, NS&W #76 (76) was the last steam locomotive engine to be commissioned for regular freight service in the United States. 76 operated in daily service until the mill owner's death in 1980, it was retired shortly after and obtained by the Amboy Depot Commission.

== Significance ==
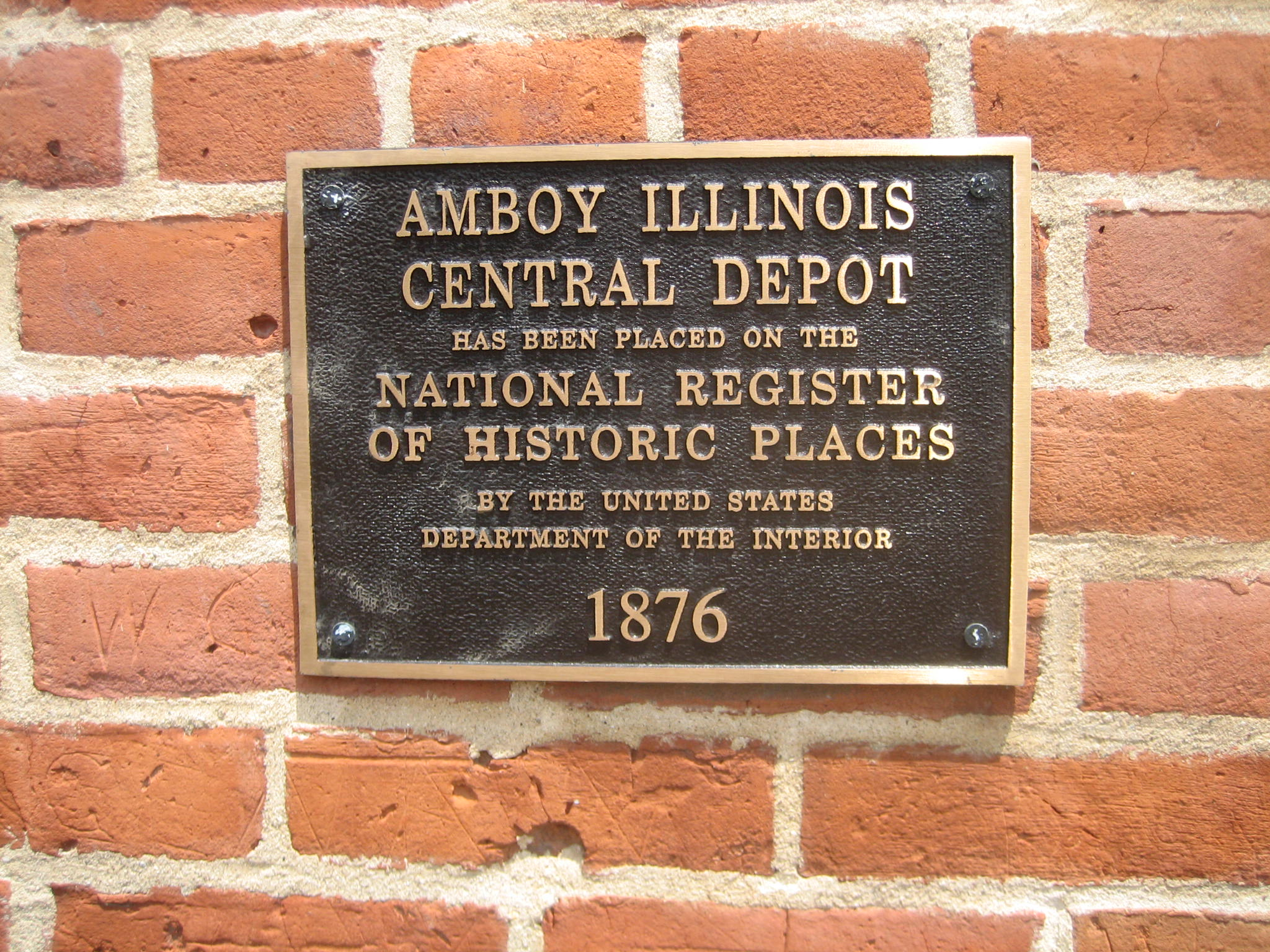
This plaque denotes the building's inclusion on the U.S. National Register of Historic Places.

The Amboy Illinois Central Depot is a locally significant structure because of its affiliation with the Illinois Central Railroad. Most of the building's architectural elements, interior and exterior, have maintained their integrity and are well preserved. Because of its association with the Illinois Central Railroad as its Northern Division headquarters the Amboy Illinois Central Depot was added to the U.S. National Register of Historic Places on August 18, 1992.

Preceding station	Illinois Central Railroad	Following station
Eldina toward Freeport	Freeport – Centralia	Sublette toward Centralia
