= The Frantz Manufacturing Company =

Manufacturer of conveyor systems

The Frantz Manufacturing Company located in Sterling, Illinois, is a manufacturer and marketer of conveyor system components and steel ball products used in a variety of applications.

== History ==
The Frantz Specialty Manufacturing Company was chartered in the State of Illinois on September 16, 1909 with purpose listed as "A general manufacturing business for the purpose of manufacturing and selling various kinds of inventions and specialties constructed of metal, wood or other materials." The original incorporators were Peter Frantz (1868–1949), Clarence Lahman (1862–1947), John Lahman, and William Lahman. On January 12, 1911, the Company re-organized and changed its name to The Frantz Manufacturing Company.

Frantz was established in Sterling, Illinois which was once known as "The Hardware Capital of the World". It is cited by the Sterling-Rock Falls Historical Society as one of four major manufacturing facilities that showed strong growth in the mid to late 20th Century. Other firms cited are Northwestern Steel and Wire Co., Lawrence Brothers, Inc. and National Manufacturing Co.

Peter Frantz was the Company's inventor. An adjustable lighting product called the "Lightning Lamp Adjuster" was patented and was among its first production products. The Company soon expanded its line to hardware products ranging from hinges to barn door track and hangers to garage door hardware for the new automobiles that began to appear. It distributed its products widely throughout the country using a captive sales force.

== Frantz Building Products Division ==
By 1925, Frantz garage door offerings included "Swinging Door", "Folding Door", "Pivot Door", and "Around the Corner Door" hardware sets along with glide hangers many of which were patented. In 1930, development began on an "OVER-THE-TOP" garage door hardware set which gained popularity. A patent was issued in September 1933. Following World War II, hardware for sectional doors was developed and in 1950, Frantz introduced its Model 200 Garage Door Series. Along with the hardware sets, wooden sectional panels were offered and gained popularity. In 1958, Frantz bought a controlling interest in Sterling Electronic Door Control Corporation which had earlier patented a new concept in garage door openers. Frantz then began marketing the openers with the doors. In 1959, Frantz introduced the first successful lightweight fiberglass garage door to the marketplace under the brand name "Filuma". By 1993, Building Products were being sold through six distribution centers in the United States and three distribution centers in Canada. On May 25, 1994, Frantz sold its Building Products Division to Wayne-Dalton Corporation, a privately held manufacturer of garage doors and related products.

== Hustler Toy Corporation ==
Frantz chartered the Hustler Toy Corporation in the State of Illinois on December 6, 1924 and produced a line of wooden toys that were sold to major toy and department stores from coast to coast including Macy's in New York and Marshall Field's in Chicago. Toys were produced until 1934 when declining sales due to the depression years of the 1920s and 30s caused Frantz to discontinue those operations.

In 1934, Frantz acquired the Koehler Die Company, a subsidiary of the L.W. Browne Manufacturing Company of DeKalb, Illinois. Koehler manufactured roller skates. Frantz invested in its skate production and soon became one of the top producers of roller skates in the United States. The skates were marketed under the name "Hustler Speed King Roller Skates" and the line was carried by jobbers, catalog premium houses, hardware and variety stores, and large chain stores throughout the country including Sears, Macy's, Montgomery Ward, Gimbels, and Marshall Field's. By the early 1970s, roller skate sales were in decline and production was discontinued. The last roller skate came off the production line on November 27, 1973.

== Frantz Bearing Division ==
In 1937, Frantz entered the conveyor wheel and semi-precision ball bearing business leveraging its experience producing roller skate wheels. During World War II, millions of conveyor wheels and bearings were produced to supply conveyor manufacturers with component products to support the war effort and this established Frantz as a major supplier of these products. An 84,000-square-foot (7,800 m^{2}) facility was built in 1971 to house the Frantz Bearing Division.

== Sterling Steel Ball Company ==
In 1947, Frantz established the Sterling Steel Ball Company to manufacture carbon steel balls (ball (bearing)) for its Bearing Division and for other customers in various business verticals such as automotive, beauty, paint, toys, casters, and drawer slides. Today, Frantz Sterling Steel Ball Division is an IATF 16949:2016 certified expert at producing drilled balls and other high quality balls for the automotive industry and owns a patented process for producing corrosion resistant balls called Sterling Armor. Sterling Steel Ball Division manufactures its products in a 79,000-square-foot (7,300 m^{2}) facility located near its Bearing Division.

== Present ==
Frantz shares went public on November 17, 1959 and traded Over the Counter until October 7, 1970 when it was listed on the American Stock Exchange. In 1985, the Company successfully defended itself from a hostile takeover attempt by E.A.C. Industries, Inc. In 1987 it was delisted from the American Stock Exchange and in 1988 became privately held. Today Frantz continues to manufacture and market anti-friction products such as bearings, conveyor wheels, and balls throughout North America and internationally from its plants in Sterling, Illinois. In 2009, it celebrated its 100th anniversary.
