= Caroline Kent =

American abstract artist (born 1975)

- Born: 1975 (age 50–51); Sterling, Illinois, U.S.
- Education: Illinois State University; University of Minnesota
- Occupation: Painter
- Awards: Artadia Chicago Award, 2020
- Website: www.carolinekent.com

Caroline Kent (born 1975, Sterling, IL) is an American visual artist based in Chicago, best known for her large scale abstract painting works that explore the interplay between language and translation. Inspired by her own personal experiences and her cultural heritage, Kent creates paintings that explore the power and limitations of communication. Her work, influenced by her Mexican heritage, delves into the potentials and confines of language and reconsiders the modernist canon of abstraction. She likens her composition process to choreography, revealing an interconnectedness between language, abstraction, and painting. Kent's artwork showcases an evolving dialogue of space, matter, and time, resulting in a confluence of drawings, paintings, sculpture, and performance, blurring the lines between these mediums.

== Early life and education ==
Caroline Kent was born in Sterling, Illinois, United States. There she grew up with her mother, father, older sister Angela, and twin sister Christine. Her mother, a Mexican homemaker, and her father, an African American accountant, highly influenced Kent's work ethic. A self-described Midwesterner, Kent spent her summers growing up working summer jobs detasseling corn and dreaming of a greater life outside the borders of her small town. Caroline Kent was very close to her twin sister, Christine Leventhal, growing up. The two shared a unique method of communication which has been highly influential in Kent's artwork.

In 1993, Kent left her hometown of Sterling to attend Illinois State University on an athletic scholarship for track and field. Here, her early inspirations included the art of Russian Constructivists and foreign films. Kent became mesmerized by the universality of the visual language found in art, discovering that on a canvas everyone had the same starting point, without having to pass through linguistic barriers.

Caroline Kent pursued her early education at Illinois State University, securing a B.A. in 1998.

After her graduation in 1998, Kent joined the Peace Corps, where she lived and worked in Transylvania, Romania for two years. Here, Kent found herself inspired by the multitude of pastel colors that would later play an important part in some of her most well known works. After the Peace Corps, Kent resided in Minneapolis for 15 years.

Kent later received her Masters of Fine Arts from the University of Minnesota in 2008.

== Career and Collections ==
Kent has also worked as an assistant professor of Art, Theory, and Practice at Northwestern University.

Her work has been included in numerous museum collections across the United States such as the Pérez Art Museum Miami, Florida; DePaul University, Chicago, Illinois; Dallas Museum of Art, Texas; Hammer Museum at University of California, Los Angeles, California; the Museum of Contemporary Art, Chicago, Illinois; the New Orleans Museum of Art, Louisiana; Solomon R. Guggenheim Museum, New York; Studio Museum in Harlem, New York; the Art Institute of Chicago, Illinois; and Walker Art Center, Minneapolis; among others.

Kent is represented by Kohn Gallery in Los Angeles and Patron Gallery in Chicago.

== Artwork ==
Kent's artistic endeavors are rooted in an interrogation of abstract painting, focusing on the intricacies of language and translation. Her work is influenced heavily by her rich Mexican heritage and her personal experiences with language and textual translation, deriving from personal experiences with her twin sister. These cultural references and personal experiences combine in Kent's work to depict a new form of communication, exploring both the powers and limitations of language. Her abstract paintings communicate how visual language can be understood in expanded forms, through both two dimensional abstract paintings and three dimensional timed based performances.

Her artworks often reflect an amalgamation of geometry, color, and pattern, reminiscent of the profound geometries of Hilma Af Klint and atmospheric abstractions by Alma Thomas. Furthermore, her work encapsulates the choreography of linguistic concepts. A feature of her artistry is the consistent use of a black background as a canvas, symbolizing a void or 'unlocatable' space, offering a neutral ground for language to reside in. Kent's paintings have developed to reflect her pursuit of understanding the language of painting in expanded forms. They transition from two-dimensional constructs to three-dimensional, and eventually, time-based performances. Kent's paintings often operate like sketches, with a process fueled by improvisation and experimentation. Kent reports that she visualizes her paintings as formulas or cosmic equations, inviting reinterpretations and new ways of comprehension.

Kent's most well known series is entitled Victoria/Veronica: The figment between us. This series draws on Kent's personal experience as a twin as the fictional framework for the imaginary twins in the exhibition. Named for her mothers first two names, the series references communication and "telepathic correspondence" between a set of fictional twins. The exhibit explores how unspoken language can operate between sisters. Eight of these large scale abstract paintings were featured in her exhibition A Sudden Appearance of the Sun at Kohn Gallery. In these works, Kent uses geometry, color, and pattern as lines of communication. The exhibit explores questions surrounding how language structures our world and society, while encouraging visitors to engage with the invented language of abstraction, which often defies easy interpretation. The large black backgrounds on the canvases in this series are meant to evoke "cosmic unknowns", serving as a metaphor for "undefinable, unlocatable spaces". Meanwhile, the pastel shapes represent things that may have once been covered in darkness but are now illuminated. This series of works is influenced by Swedish artist Hilma af Klint.

Caroline Kent's earlier works, known as her "typewriter works" also deal with the abstraction of language. These smaller works, done on paper, feature an abstract painting over text resulting from feeding the paper through an old typewriter. These pieces allow the viewer to attempt to understand the relationship between the text and abstract painted forms. Here, the filling in of missing information mirrors communication and human connection.

Kent also has a unique methodology behind creating her abstract works. She allows experimentation and improvisation to direct her painting process by leaning into the logics and practice of intuition. Kent creates mock ups of her paintings by rotating and moving pieces of paper cut into abstract shapes before finalizing the images in paint on the canvas. This method is similar to Henri Matisse's approach to painting.

=== Influences ===
Kent draws influence for her artwork from her Mexican heritage. The "bold spontaneity" and rich "structuralist dynamics" of Mexican artists such has Pedro Coronel and Luis Barragán have played a role in the large scale works full of color and texture created by Kent. Her visit to Casa Luis Barragan in Mexico City was very impactful on her series Victoria/Vernica: The figment between us. Through exploring her Mexican heritage in her art, Kent has been able to participate in a discourse of abstraction that has historically marginalized artists of color. The interaction with nature that is emphasized by Mexican artists has also played a role in influencing the pastel colors and organic shapes that appear in Kent's abstract works.

== Personal life ==
In 2017, Kent moved to the West Side of Chicago, where she currently lives and works as an artist and mother of three.

== Solo exhibitions ==
Solo exhibitions include: Sensory Poetics: Collecting Abstraction, The Solomon R Guggenheim Museum, NY, 2022, Victoria/Veronica: Making Rooms, Museum of Contemporary Art, Chicago, IL 2021, What the stars can't tell us, University Galleries, Illinois State University, Normal, IL, 2021, A Sudden Appearance of the Sun, Kohn Gallery, Los Angeles, CA, 2020, and Writing Forms, Hawthorne Contemporary, Milwaukee, WI, 2020.

== Awards and residencies ==
2020

- Joan Mitchell Foundation, Painters and Sculptors Grant, New York, NY
- Artadia Chicago Award, New York, NY

2018

- Paint School Fellowship, Shandaken: Projects, New York, NY
- Artist in Residence, Saint Catherine University, Saint Paul, MN

2016

- McKnight Fellowship for Visual Arts, Minneapolis College of Art and Design, Minneapolis, MN

2015

- Pollock-Krasner Foundation Grant, Pollock-Krasner Foundation, New York, NYArtist
- Initiative Grant, Minnesota State, Mankato, MN

2013

- Creative City Making Grant, Minneapolis, MN

2011

- Artist Initiative Grant, Minnesota State, Mankato, MN

2009

- Jerome Hill Artist Fellowship, Jerome Foundation, St. Paul, MN

2007

- Josephine Lutz Rollins Endowment, University of Minnesota, Minneapolis, MN

2006

- Josephine Lutz Rollins Endowment, University of Minnesota, Minneapolis, MN
