= 34th Illinois Infantry Regiment =

34th Regiment Illinois Volunteer Infantry "Rock River Rifles"
- Illinois state flag
- Active: September 7, 1861, to September 16, 1865
- Country: United States
- Allegiance: Union
- Branch: Infantry
- Engagements: Battle of Shiloh; Battle of Perryville; Battle of Stone's River; Battle of Missionary Ridge; Battle of Atlanta; Battle of Jonesboro; March to the Sea; Battle of Bentonville

The 34th Regiment Illinois Volunteer Infantry, known as the "Rock River Rifles," was an infantry regiment that served in the Union Army during the American Civil War. The volunteers of this regiment came from northwestern Illinois, the valley of the Rock River; thus they mainly came from Whiteside, Lee, Ogle, and Carroll counties, but some came further south from Christian, Morgan, Randolph, and Edgar counties.

Edward N. Kirk, an attorney from Sterling in Whiteside County, raised the regiment and became its first Colonel when the regiment mustered in for three years service on September 7, 1861.

== Service ==
The 34th Illinois Infantry was organized at Camp Butler, Illinois and mustered into Federal service on September 7, 1861, and moved October 2 to Columbus, Ohio, thence to Lexington, Kentucky, and then to Camp Nevin, Kentucky, where it remained until February 14, 1862. It was then in Kirk's brigade of Rousseau's division, marched to Bowling Green, and thence via Nashville, Franklin and Columbia, to Savannah on the Tennessee River. It fought at the Battle of Shiloh, being then in McCook's brigade of Buell's army, losing fifteen killed, and one hundred and twelve wounded. It was later assigned to the 2nd Brigade, 2nd Division, McCook's corps, afterward to the 14th Corps, Army of the Cumberland, participating in the following engagements: Siege of Corinth, Mississippi; Lavergne, Knob Gap or Nolensville, Stone River or Murfreesboro, Triune and Liberty Gap, Tennessee; Chickamauga, Graysville, Rocky Face Ridge, Resaca, Rome, Dallas or New Hope Church, Lost Mountain, Kennesaw Mountain, Peach Tree Creek, Siege of Atlanta, Jonesboro, and March to the Sea, Georgia; Campaign of the Carolinas, including Averasboro, Bentonville, North Carolina; and a number of minor engagements and skirmishes. After the surrender of General Joseph E. Johnston to General William T. Sherman at Bennett House, the regiment marched with Sherman's Army to Washington, D.C. and took part in the Grand Review May 24, 1865.

The regiment was mustered out on July 12, 1865, and discharged July 17, 1865, at Chicago, Illinois.

== Total strength and casualties ==
The regiment suffered 11 officers and 129 enlisted men who were killed in action or who died of their wounds and 2 officers and 119 enlisted men who died of disease, for a total of 261 fatalities.

== Commanders ==
- Colonel Edward N. Kirk
- Colonel Alexander P. Dysart
- Colonel Peter Ege - Mustered out with the regiment.

== See also ==
- List of Illinois Civil War Units
- Illinois in the American Civil War
