= Vesta Stoudt =

American factory worker; inventor of duct tape (1891–1966)

- Born: April 13, 1891; Prophetstown, Illinois, US
- Died: May 9, 1966 (aged 75); Prophetstown, Illinois, US
- Occupation: Factory worker
- Known for: Duct tape invention

Vesta Oral Stoudt (April 13, 1891 – May 9, 1966) was a factory worker during the Second World War famous for her letter to President Franklin D. Roosevelt suggesting the use of adhesive tape to improve ammunition boxes.

== Early life and marriage ==
Born in Prophetstown, Whiteside County, Illinois, to Ulysses Simpson Grant and Gertrude Caroline Johnson Wildman on April 13, 1891.

Vesta Wildman married Harry Isaac Stoudt on 19 October 1910 in Morgan, Illinois, and they went on to have eight children. As of 1943, Vesta Stoudt had two sons serving in the Navy. She wanted to do her part to help her sons and their fellow servicemen, so she got a job at Green River inspecting and packing cartridges used to launch rifle grenades that were used by soldiers in the Army and Navy.

== Invention of modern duct tape ==
In 1943, during the Second World War, Stoudt worked at the Green River Ordnance Plant in Amboy, Illinois, packing ammunition boxes. She recognized that the way ammunition boxes were sealed made them difficult for soldiers to open in a hurry. The cartridges were packed eleven to a box, and the boxes were taped and waxed to make them waterproof and damp-proof. The box flaps were sealed with thin paper tape, and a tab of tape was left loose so that it could be pulled to release the waterproof wax coating and open the box. The problem was that due to the paper tape's thinness, the tabs often wore off, leaving soldiers frantically trying to open the box while under fire. She suggested this idea to her bosses at work, who did not implement the change. On February 10, 1943, she wrote a letter to President Franklin D. Roosevelt, outlining the problem and her solution, complete with diagrams:

I suggested we use a strong cloth tape to close seams, and make tab of same. It worked fine, I showed it to different government inspectors they said it was all right, but I could never get them to change tape.

— Vesta Stoudt to President Roosevelt, February 10, 1943

Roosevelt approved of the idea which he sent to the War Production Board, who wrote back to Stoudt:

The Ordnance Department has not only pressed this idea ... but has now informed us that the change you have recommended has been approved with the comment that the idea is of exceptional merit.

— War Production Board's Ordnance Department to Vesta Stoudt, March 26, 1943

They tasked the Revolite Corporation to create the product. Stoudt received the Chicago Tribune's War Worker Award for her idea and for her persistence with it. She is credited by Johnson and Johnson (the parent company of Revolite Corporation at the time) for the invention of duct tape.

== Death ==
Vesta O. Stoudt died at age 75 on May 9, 1966, at the Whiteside County Nursing Home in Prophetstown, following a long illness.
