= Kenje Ogata =

U.S. Army Air Forces airman (1919–2012)

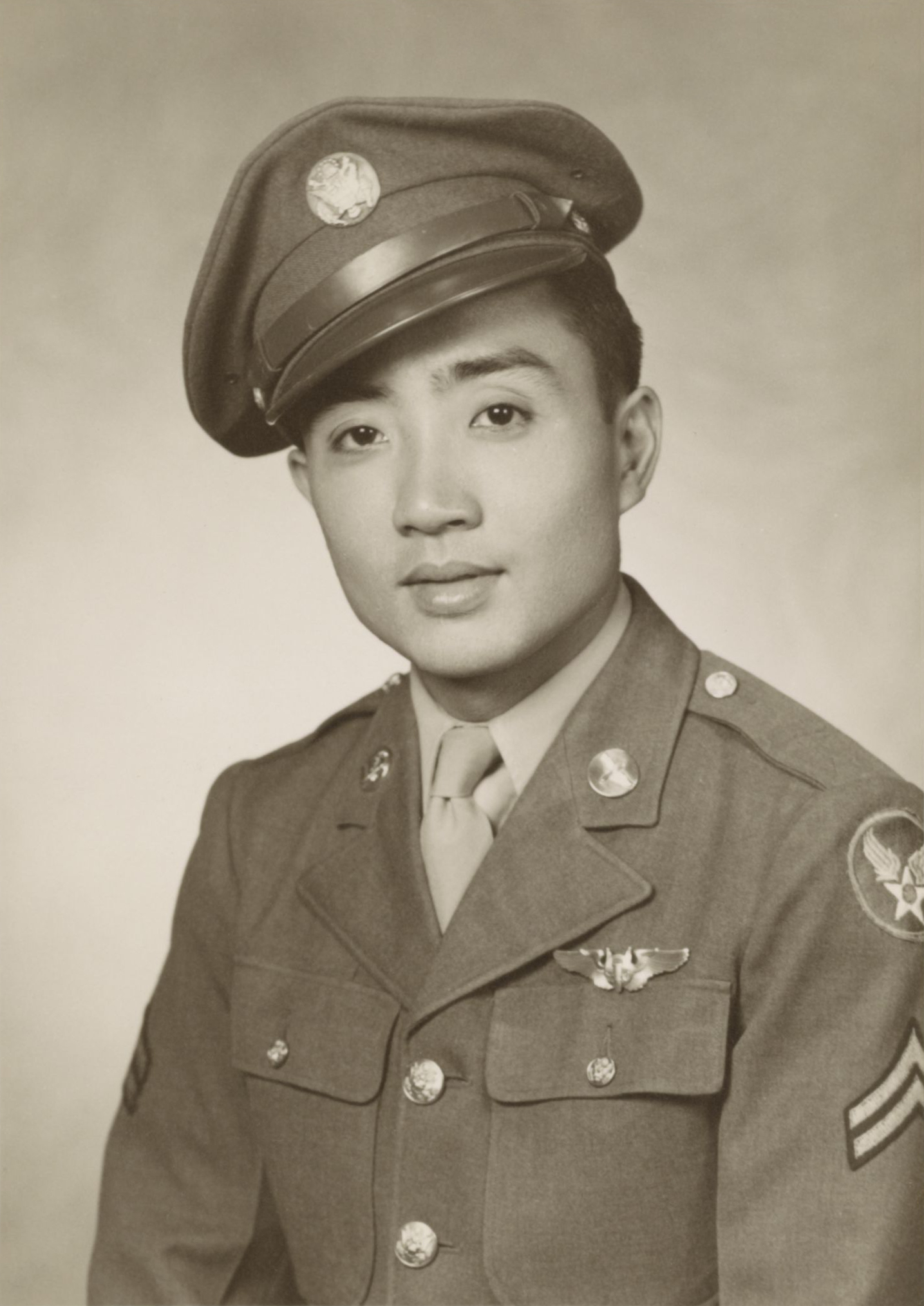
- Kenje Ogata in 1943
- Born: June 1, 1919; Gary, Indiana
- Died: January 18, 2012 (aged 92); Sterling, Illinois
- Military career
- Allegiance: United States
- Branch: United States Army Air Corps
- Rank: Sergeant First Class
- Units: 451st Bomb Group, 726th Squadron
- Conflicts: World War II
- Awards: Air Medal; Purple Heart

Kenje Ogata (Japanese: 緒方 健二, June 1, 1919 – January 18, 2012) was an American soldier and one of five documented people of Japanese descent to serve in the United States Army Air Corps during World War II.

== Early years ==
Ogata was born on June 1, 1919, in Gary, Indiana, the son of Clay Kamezo and Wai (née Mitsuda) Ogata. He grew up in Sterling, Illinois, participated in the Boy Scouts, and graduated in 1936 from Sterling High School. Following his graduation, Ogata worked in the plating room of the National Manufacturing Company. Interested in aviation, he earned his pilot's license through the Civilian Pilots Training Program (CPTP).

== World War II ==
Following the bombing of Pearl Harbor on December 7, 1941, Ogata boarded a train to Chicago, Illinois, to join the service. Due to his Japanese heritage, he was discouraged from joining by the enlistment officers. However, Ogata was determined to join the service, telling the recruitment office "I am here to serve". Enlisted and sent through training, Ogata was assigned as a medical corpsman to Camp Grant, Rockford, Illinois. Despite his requests for reassignment, prejudice against those of Japanese heritage remained and his requests were refused. Ogata, unwilling to accept this, enlisted the support of the Sterling community receiving letters of support and recommendation from the town's mayor, police chief, city attorney, and local judges attesting to his character. Eventually, the Army agreed and transferred Ogata.

Ogata was transferred on December 31, 1943, to the Army Air Corps and assigned to the 15th Air Force, 49th Bomb Wing, 451st Bomb Group, 726th Squadron in Italy. Consisting of B-24s, Ogata trained as a ball turret gunner. While serving with the 451st Bomb Group, Ogata rose to the rank of Staff Sergeant, completed thirty-five missions, and survived two crashes. For his service and injuries sustained in combat, he received the Air Medal with three bronze oak leaf clusters and the Purple Heart.

== Post-war ==
Ogata enrolled in college on the G.I. Bill and earned a degree from the University of Illinois Chicago College of Dentistry. After a fellowship in Honolulu, he founded a dental practice in his hometown of Sterling. He retired in 1996 and died in 2012.
