= Green River Ordnance Plant =

Coordinates: 41.7333333°N 89.3916667°W

Location in Illinois

The Green River Ordnance Plant, also known as the Green River Arsenal, was a large munitions factory complex between Dixon and Amboy in Lee County, Illinois, on the south side of U.S. Highway 30. From its rapid construction in 1942 to its swift shutdown in 1945, Stewart-Warner Corporation operated the complex to produce rocket-propelled bazooka ammunition, artillery shells, naval shells, bombs, rifle grenades, fuses and rockets for use during World War II. The plant is also where Vesta Stoudt invented modern duct tape.

== See also ==
- Rock Island Arsenal
- Joliet Army Ammunition Plant
- Sangamon Ordnance Plant
- Lake City Army Ammunition Plant
