= Heidi Hahn =

New York-based artist

Heidi Hahn (born 1982) is an American artist based in Brooklyn.

== Early life ==
Hahn was born in Los Angeles in 1982 to a working-class family. At age 15, she saved up money from her weekend job at a retirement home to buy herself her first paints.

== Education ==
Hahn attended Cooper Union, earning a Bachelor's degree in fine art in 2006. She earned a Master's from Yale in 2014.

== Career ==
Hahn teaches a graduate course at the New York Academy of Art. She is also an acting Professor of Painting and Drawing at Alfred University.

Hahn's work has been collected by the Moderna Museet, High Museum of Art, New Orleans Museum of Art, Kadist Art Foundation, Saastamoinen Foundation Art Collection, and New Century Art Foundation. Solo and group exhibitions have taken place at the New Orleans Museum of Art, High Museum of Art, Nerman Museum of Contemporary Art, Jack Hanley Gallery, Kohn Gallery, Anton Kern Gallery, Nathalie Karg Gallery, and Premier Regard.

== Recognition ==
Hahn has been the recipient of awards, residencies, and fellowships, including the Sharpe-Walentas Studio Program Residency, Jerome Foundation Grant, Skowhegan School of Painting and Sculpture Residency, and the Fine Arts Work Center Residency.
