= Paul W. Dillon Home =

Historic house in Illinois, United States

Coordinates: 41.7913°N 89.6809°W

- The Dillon Home
- U.S. National Register of Historic Places
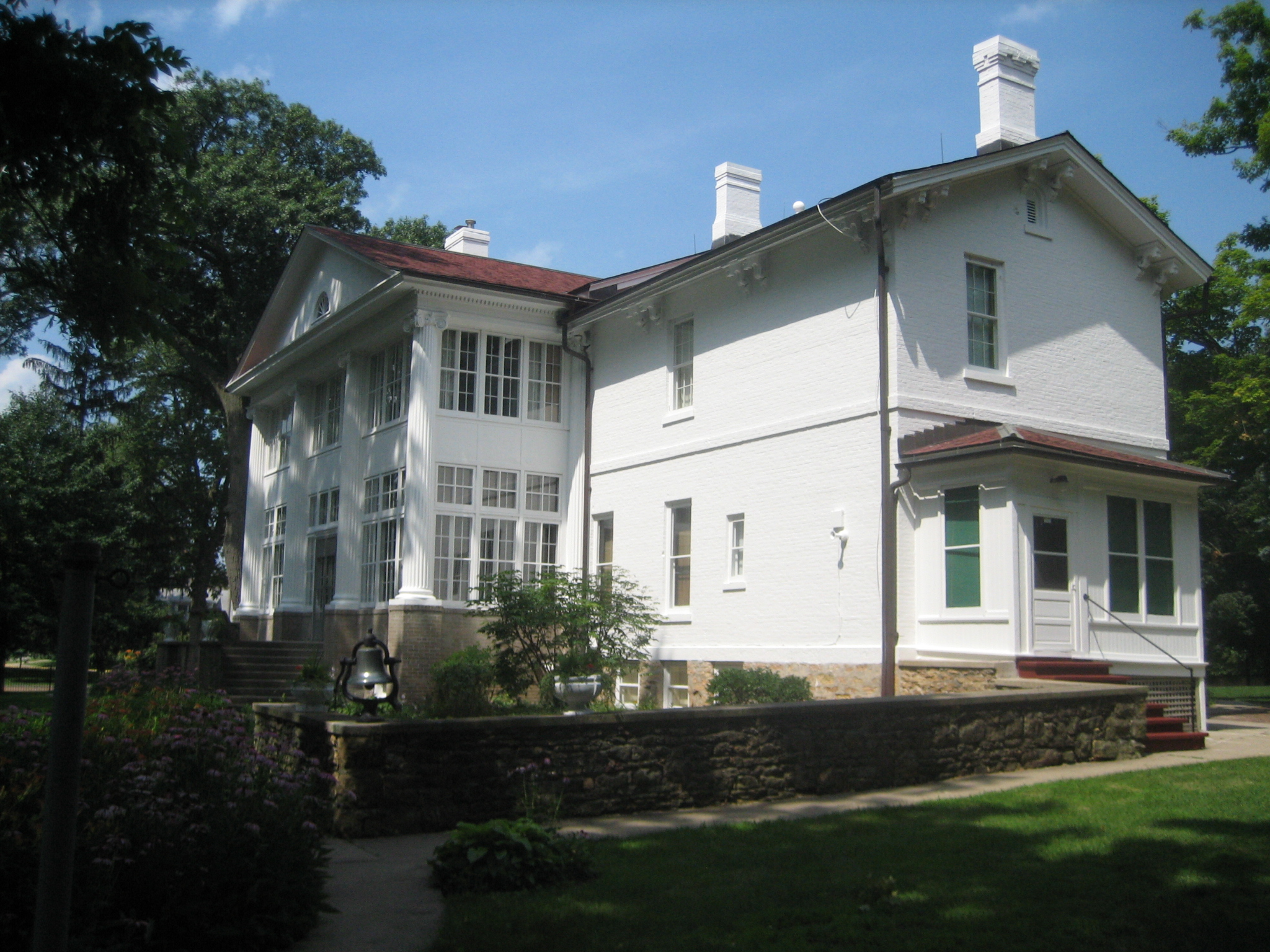
- The back of the Dillon Home
- Location: Sterling, Illinois
- Built: 1857
- Architectural style: Italianate
- NRHP reference No.: 80001417
- Added to NRHP: October 9, 1980

The Paul W. Dillon Home, often referred to as the Dillon Home, is located in Sterling, Illinois. It was home to businessman P.W. Dillon, who was the president of Northwestern Steel & Wire Company for many of its most successful years. The home was added to the National Register of Historic Places on October 9, 1980.

== History ==
While the land itself had dozens of owners, once built, the home with the land had seven owners with only six residing within its walls. The Victorian home less its East wing, was constructed in 1858 in the Italianate style. It was originally built for Civil War general Edward Needles Kirk.

The home was eventually purchased by Washington M. Dillon, and ultimately conveyed to his son, P.W., following his death.

In 1904, P.W. married Lucretia (Crete) Blackman Dillon, of Dixon. The couple raised their three children in P.W.'s boyhood home. To accommodate their growing family, P.W. replaced the existing small, open porch on the south with a much larger enclosed two-story porch. The northeast porch was also enclosed. Since then, the only major structural change has been the installation of an elevator in 1972. The home's grandeur is a remarkable sight, as P.W.'s wife Crete, was an avid traveler, and collector of eclectic pieces and period furniture.

P.W. and Crete lived in the home for 50 years when Crete died in 1970. Ten years later, P.W. died in the same home where he was born. Unique from most historic home museums, The Dillon Home retains all of the original furnishings and belongings. The home and land was conveyed to the Sterling Park District after PW.’s passing in 1980.

The home opened to the public as a museum on November 18, 1980. The following year, Baldwin Steam Engine #73 was retired and moved to the south lawn along with a tender and caboose. Until its retirement, the engine was operational at Northwestern Steel & Wire, and was the last working steam engine in the United States used in an industrial application.

The home is currently open to the public for tours and is available for special event rentals. Improvements to the Sterling trail system are underway as of 2025, and aim to connect trails that run towards the Dillon Home.

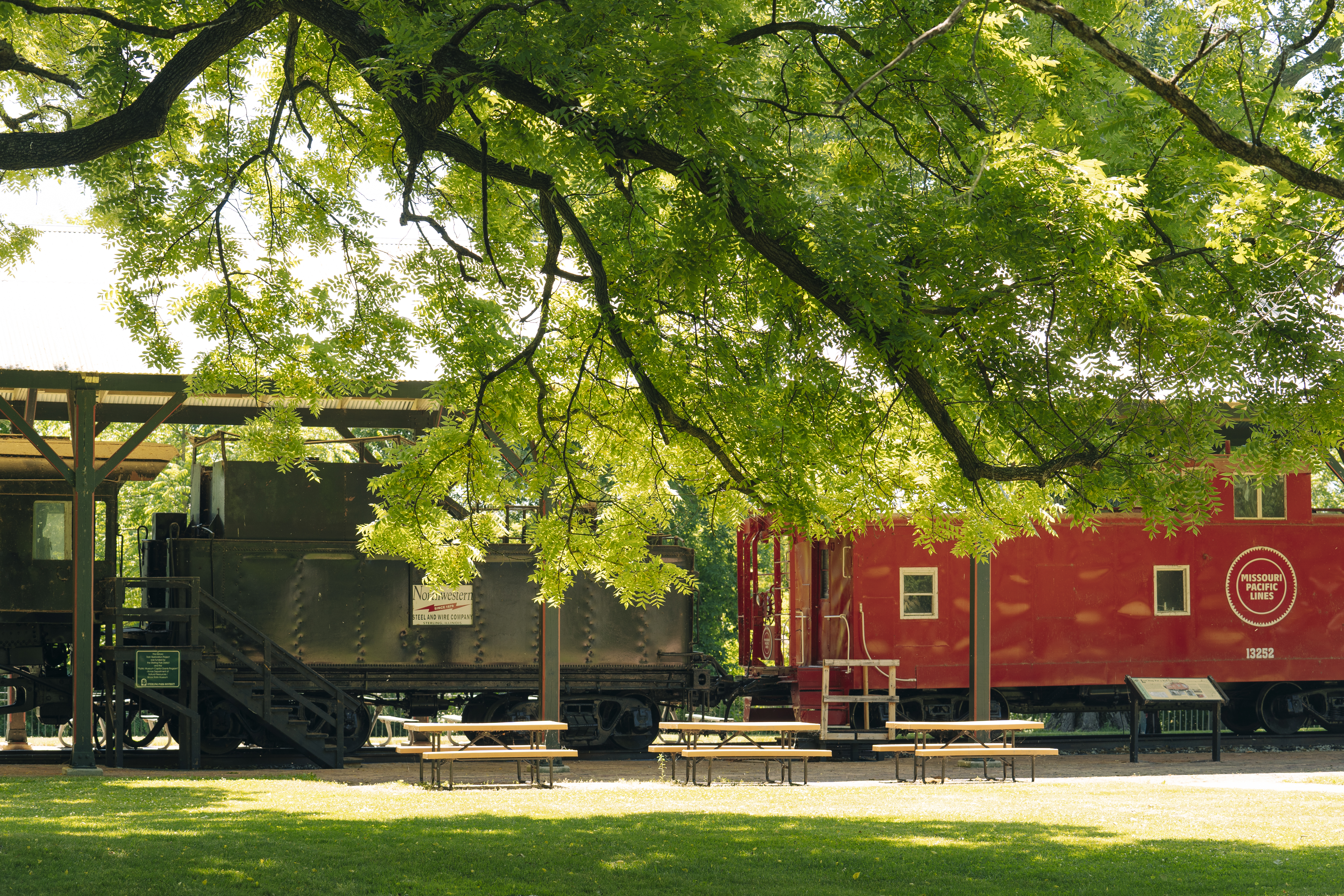
Dillon Home Steam Engine
