= Amboy, Illinois =

- City
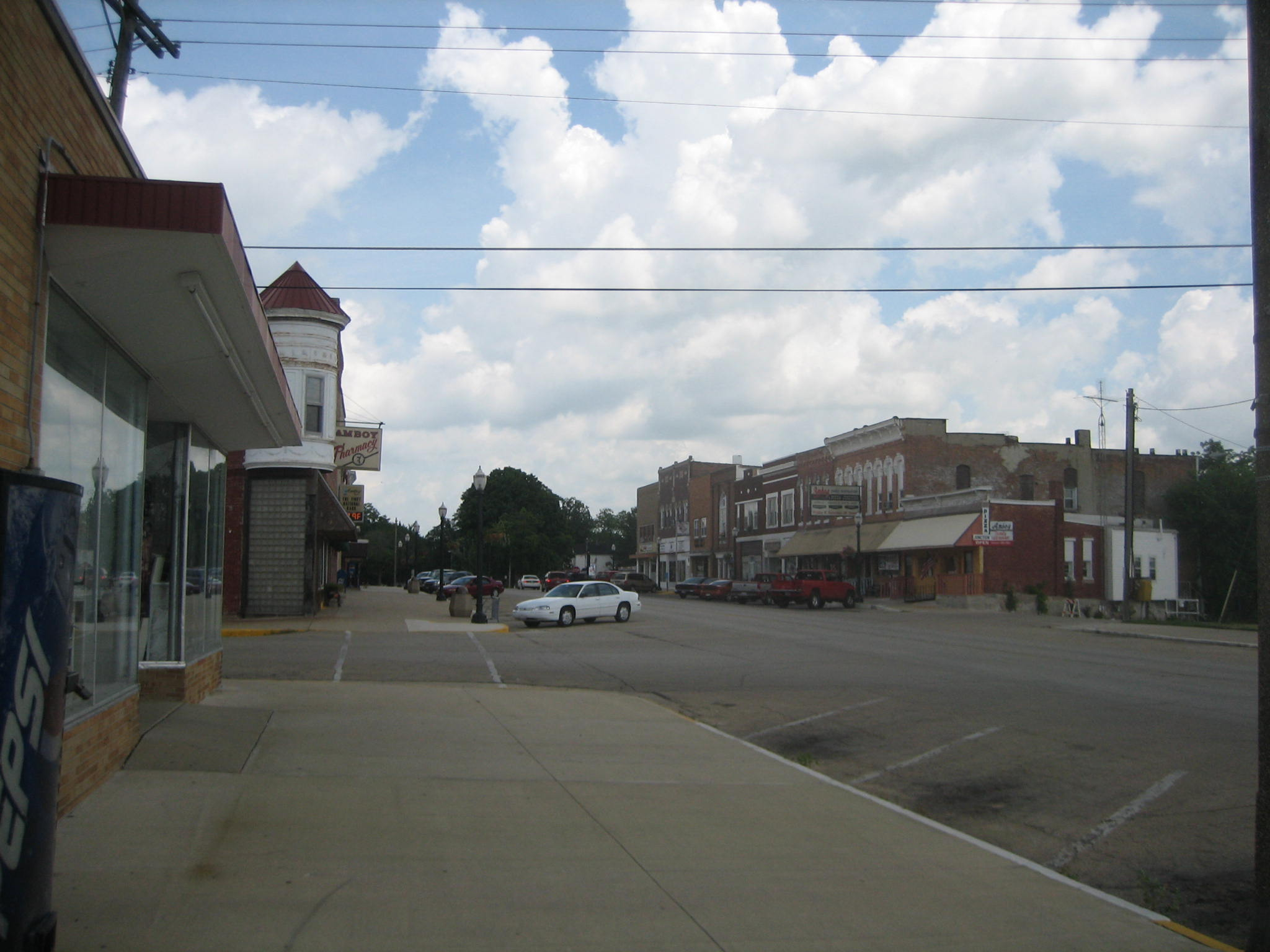
- Downtown Amboy, Illinois

- Location of Amboy in Lee County, Illinois.

- Location of Illinois in the United States
- Coordinates: 41°43′52″N 89°22′30″W
- Country: United States
- State: Illinois
- County: Lee

Area
  - Total: 6.21 sq mi (16.09 km^{2})
  - Land: 6.21 sq mi (16.09 km^{2})
  - Water: 0 sq mi (0.00 km^{2})
- Elevation: 761 ft (232 m)

Population (2020)
  - Total: 2,278
  - Density: 366.8/sq mi (141.61/km^{2})
- Time zone: UTC-6 (CST)
  - Summer (DST): UTC-5 (CDT)
- ZIP code: 61310
- Area codes: 815, 779
- FIPS code: 17-01270
- GNIS feature ID: 2393944
- Website: cityofamboy.com

Amboy is a city in Lee County, Illinois, United States, along the Green River. As of the 2020 census, Amboy had a population of 2,278.

== History ==
Amboy had its start in the 1850s when the Illinois Central Railroad was extended to that point. The community's name is a transfer from Amboy, New Jersey.

The chain of Carson Pirie Scott & Co. began in Amboy when Samuel Carson opened his first dry goods store there in 1854.

The Christian denomination Community of Christ, formerly the Reorganized Church of Jesus Christ of Latter Day Saints, had a general conference in Amboy on April 6, 1860, at which time Joseph Smith III reorganized the church founded by his father Joseph Smith Jr.

The Illinois Central facility in Amboy served as the railroad's division headquarters for the railroad's region. The building was saved from demolition and is a museum. The actual railroad and trainyard were abandoned and removed in the early 90's.

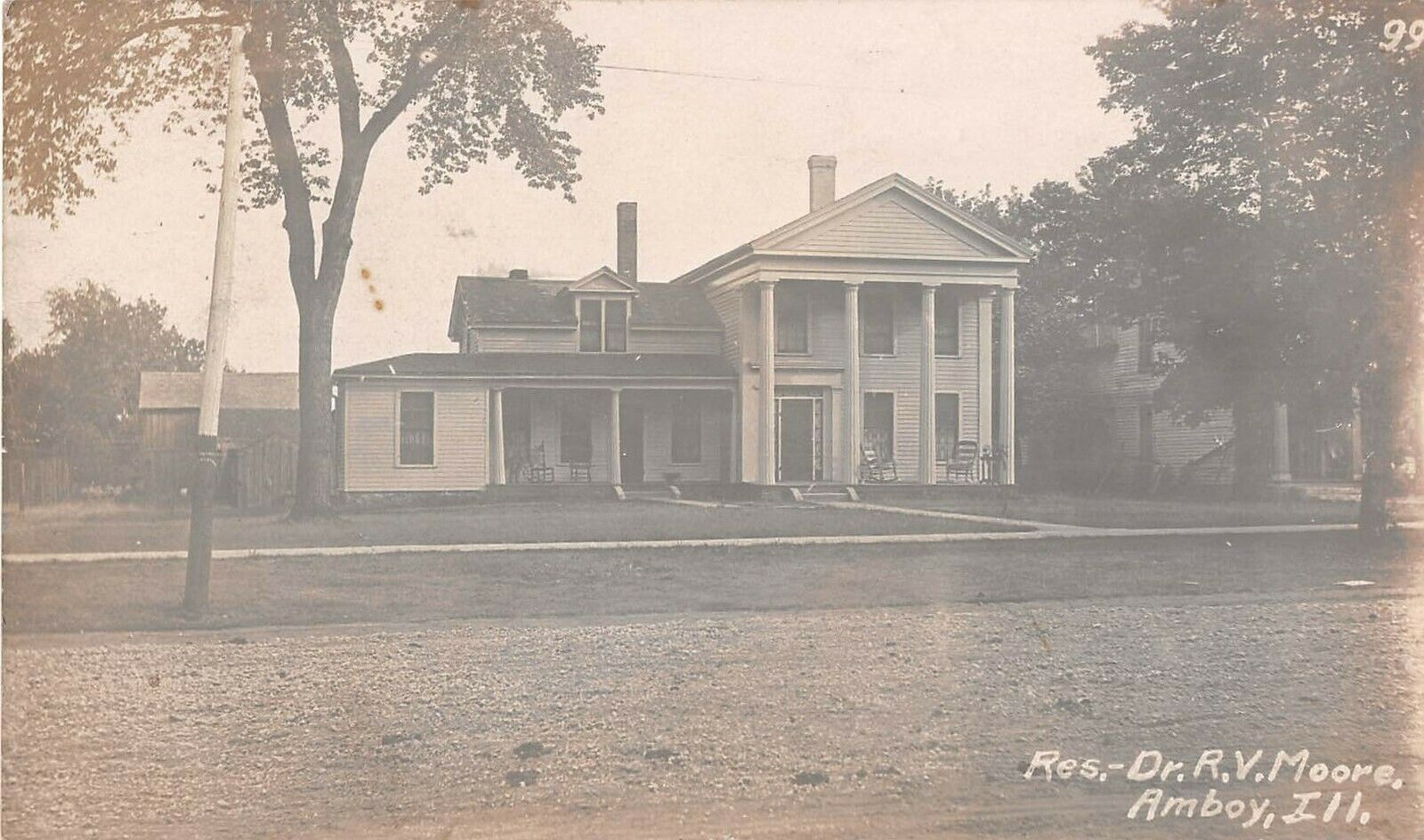
303 East Main St., Amboy, IL - c. 1910

Amboy was the site of an ammunition factory for World War II - The Green River Ordnance Plant. It was roughly bordered by Sterling Rd to the south, Bataan Rd to the East, and Bataan Rd. to the North and West of the facility. The facility employed 4500 people at one time. The facility was completed on Dec. 15, 1942 and used until VJ day in August 1945.

The plant is also known as the place where Vesta Stoudt first invented modern duct tape.

== Geography ==
According to the 2021 census gazetteer files, Amboy has a total area of 6.37 square miles (16.50 km^{2}), all land.

== Demographics ==
Historical population
Census	Pop.	Note	%±
1860	1,615		—
1870	2,825		74.9%
1880	2,448		−13.3%
1890	2,257		−7.8%
1900	1,826		−19.1%
1910	1,749		−4.2%
1920	1,944		11.1%
1930	1,972		1.4%
1940	1,986		0.7%
1950	2,128		7.2%
1960	2,067		−2.9%
1970	2,184		5.7%
1980	2,377		8.8%
1990	2,377		0.0%
2000	2,561		7.7%
2010	2,500		−2.4%
2020	2,278		−8.9%
U.S. Decennial Census

=== 2020 census ===
As of the 2020 census, Amboy had a population of 2,278. The population density was 357.73 inhabitants per square mile (138.12/km^{2}). The median age was 42.8 years. 21.5% of residents were under the age of 18 and 17.5% of residents were 65 years of age or older. For every 100 females there were 98.8 males, and for every 100 females age 18 and over there were 97.9 males age 18 and over.

0.0% of residents lived in urban areas, while 100.0% lived in rural areas.

There were 974 households in Amboy, including 640 families, and 27.7% had children under the age of 18 living in them. Of all households, 43.9% were married-couple households, 20.7% were households with a male householder and no spouse or partner present, and 27.3% were households with a female householder and no spouse or partner present. About 33.9% of all households were made up of individuals and 15.2% had someone living alone who was 65 years of age or older. The average household size was 3.02 and the average family size was 2.50.

There were 1,077 housing units, of which 9.6% were vacant. The homeowner vacancy rate was 4.5% and the rental vacancy rate was 7.2%. The average housing unit density was 169.13 per square mile (65.30/km^{2}).

Racial composition as of the 2020 census
Race	Number	Percent
White	2,085	91.5%
Black or African American	18	0.8%
American Indian and Alaska Native	5	0.2%
Asian	14	0.6%
Native Hawaiian and Other Pacific Islander	1	0.0%
Some other race	38	1.7%
Two or more races	117	5.1%
Hispanic or Latino (of any race)	108	4.7%

=== Income and poverty ===
The median income for a household in the city was $59,815, and the median income for a family was $70,671. Males had a median income of $45,809 versus $25,194 for females. The per capita income for the city was $26,668. About 7.3% of families and 14.4% of the population were below the poverty line, including 16.4% of those under age 18 and 13.2% of those age 65 or over.

== Education ==
It is in the Amboy Community Unit School District 272.

== Notable people ==
- Betty Degner, All-American Girls Professional Baseball League player
- Augustus Newnham Dickens, brother of Charles Dickens
- Henry F. McElroy, Missouri businessman and politician
- Michael M. Mihm, United States District Judge for the Central District of Illinois
- David C. Shapiro, dentist and Illinois state legislator
- Frank Shaughnessy, Notre Dame football player, pro baseball player and executive
- Vesta Stoudt, invented modern duct tape at the Green River Ordinance Plant.

== See also ==
- Amboy Illinois Central Depot
