= Illiopolis, Illinois =

Illiopolis
- Village
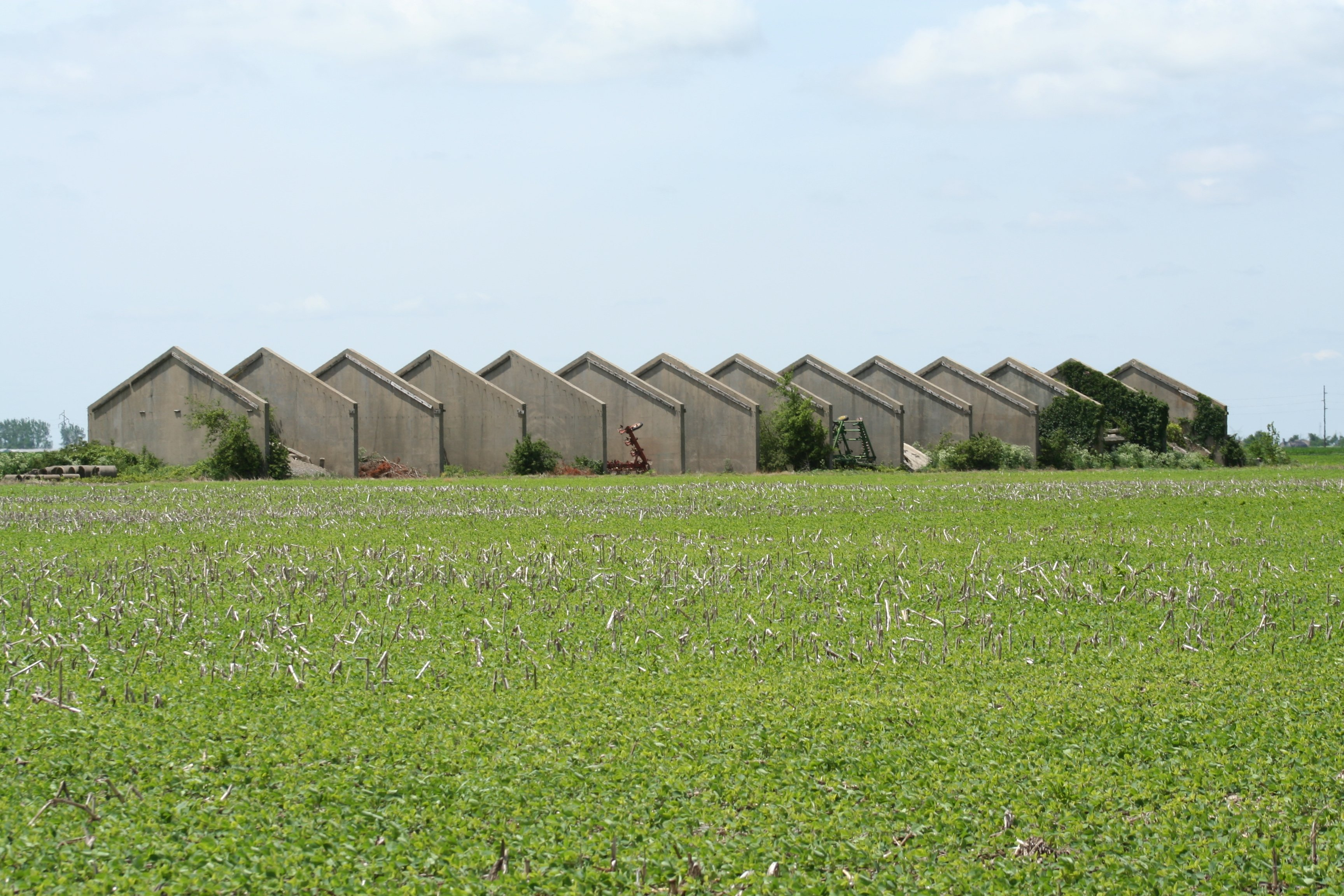
- The ruins of the Sangamon Ordnance Plant, closed following World War II, lie west of Illiopolis.

- Location of Illiopolis in Sangamon County, Illinois.
- Coordinates: 39°51′04″N 89°14′56″W
- Country: United States
- State: Illinois
- County: Sangamon

Area
  - Total: 0.68 sq mi (1.75 km^{2})
  - Land: 0.68 sq mi (1.75 km^{2})
  - Water: 0 sq mi (0.00 km^{2})
- Elevation: 594 ft (181 m)

Population (2020)
  - Total: 846
  - Density: 1,249.4/sq mi (482.39/km^{2})
- Time zone: UTC-6 (CST)
  - Summer (DST): UTC-5 (CDT)
- ZIP code: 62539
- Area code: 217
- FIPS code: 17-37127
- GNIS feature ID: 2398568
- Website: http://illiopolis.illinois.gov/

Illiopolis is a village in Sangamon County, Illinois, United States. As of the 2020 census, Illiopolis had a population of 846. It is part of the Springfield, Illinois Metropolitan Statistical Area.

== History ==
The name was formed from Illinois and -polis, a Greek suffix meaning "city".

== Geography ==
According to the 2010 census, Illiopolis has a total area of 0.677 square miles (1.75 km^{2}), all land.

== Demographics ==
Historical population
Census	Pop.	Note	%±
1870	395		—
1880	686		73.7%
1890	689		0.4%
1900	744		8.0%
1910	849		14.1%
1920	814		−4.1%
1930	715		−12.2%
1940	714		−0.1%
1950	833		16.7%
1960	995		19.4%
1970	1,122		12.8%
1980	1,118		−0.4%
1990	934		−16.5%
2000	916		−1.9%
2010	891		−2.7%
2020	846		−5.1%
U.S. Decennial Census

As of the census estimates of 2011, there were 897 people, 362 households, and 263 families residing in the village. The population density was 2,027.0 inhabitants per square mile (782.6/km^{2}). There were 390 housing units at an average density of 863.0 per square mile (333.2/km^{2}). The racial makeup of the village was 98.91% White, 0.22% Native American, and 0.87% from two or more races. Hispanic or Latino of any race were 0.11% of the population.

There were 362 households, out of which 34.3% had children under the age of 18 living with them, 58.3% were married couples living together, 8.8% had a female householder with no husband present, and 27.3% were non-families. 23.2% of all households were made up of individuals, and 9.4% had someone living alone who was 65 years of age or older. The average household size was 2.53 and the average family size was 2.99.

In the village, the population was spread out, with 25.4% under the age of 18, 9.1% from 18 to 24, 30.1% from 25 to 44, 23.9% from 45 to 64, and 11.5% who were 65 years of age or older. The median age was 37 years. For every 100 females, there were 96.1 males. For every 100 females age 18 and over, there were 99.7 males.

The median income for a household in the village was $46,442, and the median income for a family was $52,898. Males had a median income of $36,250 versus $26,786 for females. The per capita income for the village was $19,473. About 2.7% of families and 3.0% of the population were below the poverty line, including 3.6% of those under age 18 and 6.4% of those age 65 or over.

== Formosa Plastics ==
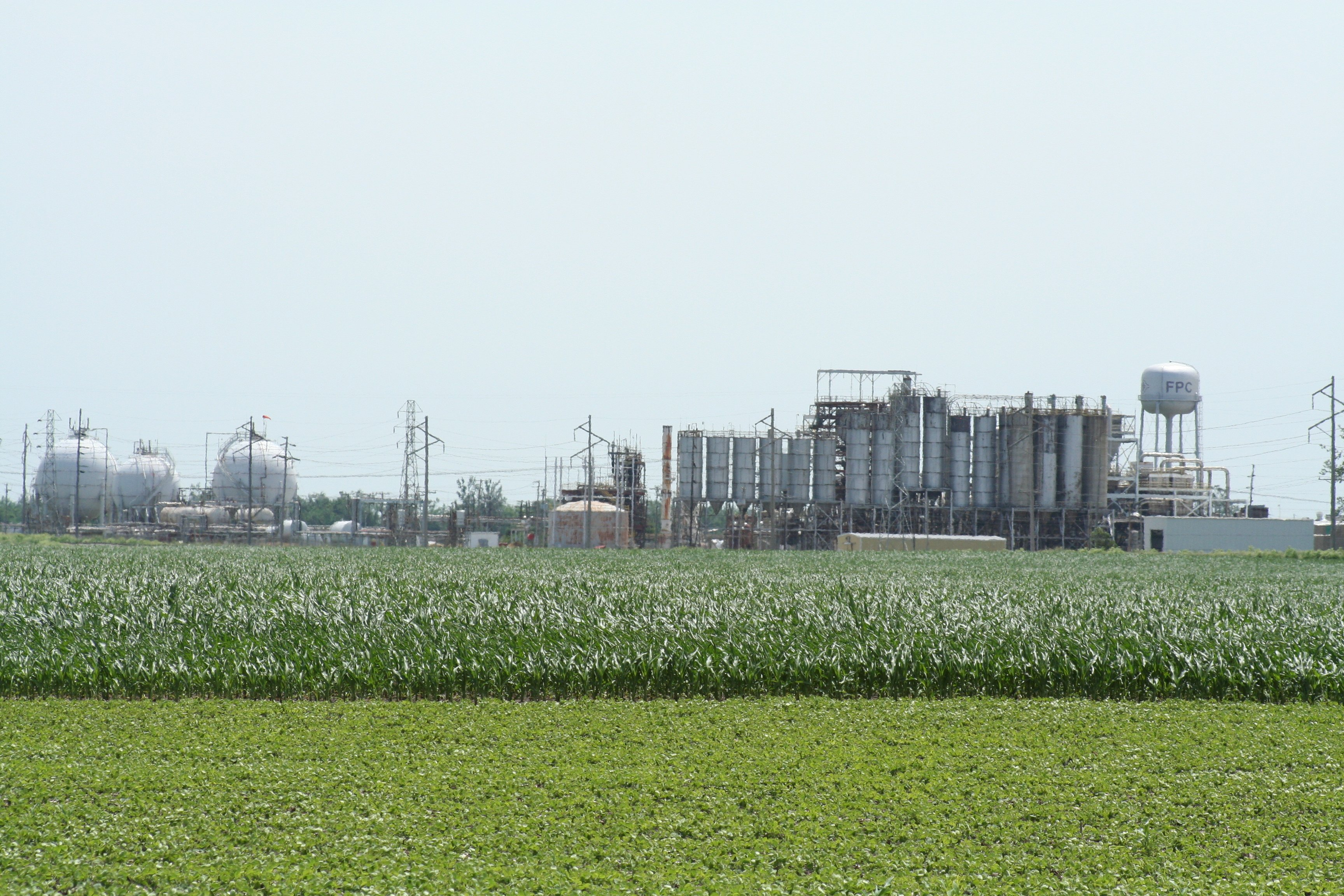
The Formosa Plastics plant near Illiopolis, (only a skeleton crew of maintenance personnel and security workers remained in May 2009)

Borden, Inc constructed a PVC plant west of Illiopolis in 1962 in the industrial area that had been the Sangamon Ordnance Plant. It operated the plant until 1987 when it transferred to Borden Chemicals and Plastics Operating Limited Partnership. Following that company's bankruptcy, the facility was purchased by Formosa Plastics Corporation in 2002. On April 24, 2004, the Formosa Plastics plant (formerly Borden) in Illiopolis exploded, killing five people, injuring others and causing a portion of the town to be evacuated. The fire burned for several days and the plant had not reopened as of 2007. On March 6, 2007, the United States Chemical Safety Board (CSB) released its final report on the incident indicating that an operator bypassed a safety interlock and drained a pressurized reactor instead of an empty one they were in the process of cleaning. The report listed as root causes, that Formosa-IL and Borden Chemical "did not adequately address the potential for human error."

== Notable people ==
- Ray Demmitt, outfielder for various teams
- Eric Weaver, pitcher for various teams

== See also ==
- Sangamon Ordnance Plant
