= Northwestern Steel and Wire =

Defunct American steel mill

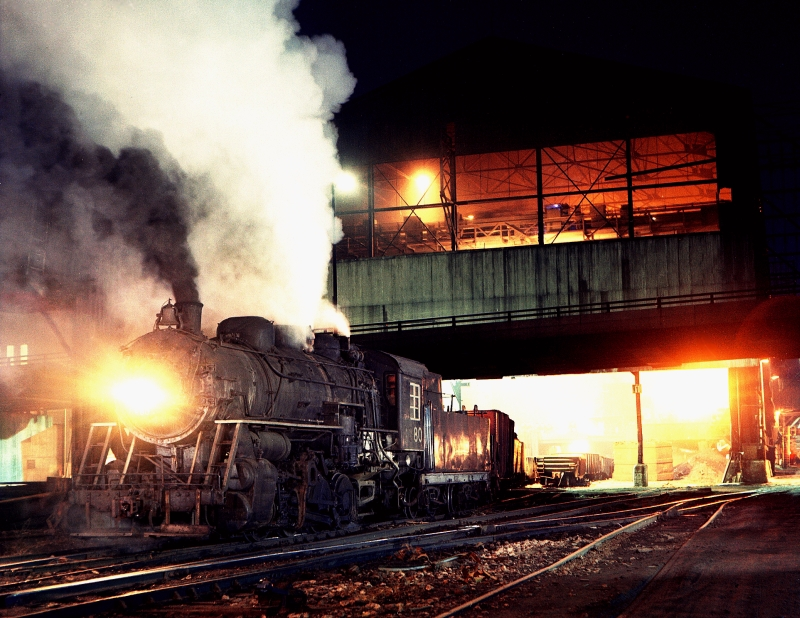
Steam locomotive NS&W #80 on a July night in 1964.

Northwestern Steel and Wire was a steel mill and wire factory located in Sterling, Illinois. It began producing steel in 1936 and ceased production in 2001.

== Early history ==
The beginning of Northwestern Steel and Wire Co. (NWSW) can be traced back to Washington M. Dillon's move to Rock Falls, Illinois from Ohio. He founded Northwestern Barbed Wire Co. upon his arrival in 1879. In 1892 Dillon partnered with J.W. Griswold to form Dillon-Griswold Company. Dillon-Griswold produced barbed wire, bale ties, drawn wire, and nails. Dillon left the company in 1902 to devote himself fully to Rock Falls operation. By 1912 the Griswold Company had landed itself in receivership and its assets were liquidated to the Lawrence Brothers of Sterling, Illinois. Within the next week Dillon had purchased the Griswold Co. from the Lawrence Brothers and moved Northwestern Barbed Wire to Sterling.

== Steel production begins ==
=== The first furnaces ===
In 1936, Washington Dillon's son, P.W. Dillon, installed two electric furnaces and rolling machines in the barbed wire factory in order to make low carbon steel. Two years later the company became known as Northwestern Steel and Wire. The systems and furnaces were successively upgraded in the ensuing years. During World War II, to keep up with escalating demand, two 50-ton electric furnaces were installed. By 1950 150-ton furnaces were in use. Throughout the years, as production increased, larger furnaces became the norm.

=== Living and working in the Post-WWII years ===
In the years following the end of World War II, Northwestern Steel and Wire attracted workers from several states away, especially from the Southern states such as Texas and Oklahoma that were in the midst of a post-war recession. These workers were housed in 100 railroad box cars converted to homes and arranged in 4 rows of 25 each along the Rock River. The cars were all painted silver with paint left over from the war and the residents referred to the place as "Silver City". The rental charges were taken out of the employee's pay and there was a "Company Store" adjacent to the store, that could be used to buy groceries with company credit.

=== Production in the modern era ===
By 1968, NWSW had installed a massive 250-ton furnace, but it was during the 1970s that the scale of the furnaces at the Sterling plant became truly enormous. This capacity allowed NWSW to achieve the ranking of "15th or 16th largest United States steel concern, depending on whether it is ranked by tonnage output or dollar volume." In the 1970 fiscal year, NWSW's revenue was nearly $160 million.

In 1971 and 1976 two 400-ton Electro-Melt furnaces were put in place, by George F Reitzel Electric. Those were the largest furnaces in the world at the time. A third furnace was converted to 400-ton capacity in 1979. In the same year, NWSW employed 4,678 people, the highest number ever employed as Whiteside County's largest industry.

The 1980s started with a worldwide steel depression. That, coupled with stiffer competition, resulted in a significant downturn for the company. For example, during the fourth quarter of 1984 NWSW lost $15.8 million. During the same period a year later, they lost $10.4 million.

=== Usage of steam locomotives ===
Northwestern Steel used steam locomotives to move scrap metal to the furnaces and to transfer hot ingots to the rolling machines, long after the era of steam engines was bygone in the broader culture. The company usually bought second-hand switchers from railroads such as the Illinois Central. The engines used in the mill weren't graceful or agile, like many of those that once pulled passenger trains. They were unseemly and barely capable of moving 40 mph.

In 1960, 15 steam locomotives came in from the Grand Trunk Western Railroad. NWSW, seeing that a few were in good shape, decided not to scrap them all but rather use them in the scrap yard.

Northwestern Steel's steam engines were among the last to operate in the United States. 73, as it was known, (a 1929 Baldwin locomotive) was among the final steam engines used in regular service in America. NWSW last used the locomotive on Dec. 3, 1980 at 10 a.m. Its final run was made coupled to the technology that replaced it, a diesel engine. On Jan. 19, 1981, No. 73 was moved to the south lawn of the Paul W. Dillon Home. From tracks inside the steel mill complex, the locomotive was taken east along the Geneva Subdivision main line of the Chicago & North Western Railroad a mile and a half to a location which passes just behind the Dillon home. 73 was then lifted via four cranes and moved the last 75 yards to its final resting place as a memorial to Dillon, the man who kept the idea of steam engines alive for more than twenty years.

=== The end of an era ===
On Oct. 7, 1998, NWSW announced its intention to cease production of most of its wire products. At the time its work force hovered around 2,000. With the company's announcement, over 400 people were laid off, bringing the total employed to 1,503. Dec. 19, 2000 the company filed a voluntary petition for reorganization under Chapter 11 of the United States Bankruptcy Code; the company lost more than $83 million that year. On May 18, 2001, Northwestern Steel and Wire ceased operations.

In 2002, Leggett & Platt, a Fortune 500 company, later reopened a portion of the old mill with a new name, Sterling Steel Company LLC (SSC). Today, Sterling Steel Company employs roughly 260 workers.

== Labor strife ==
Around the time of the company's nomenclature alteration (to Northwestern Steel and Wire), the first significant attempts to organize NWSW's labor force were made. In July 1936 a three-week labor strike was led by labor activist John L. Lewis. During the violence that followed at least one worker died.

== See also ==
- Amboy Illinois Central Depot
- Crab Orchard and Egyptian Railway
