= Sangamon Ordnance Plant =

Coordinates: 39.852669°N 89.292447°W

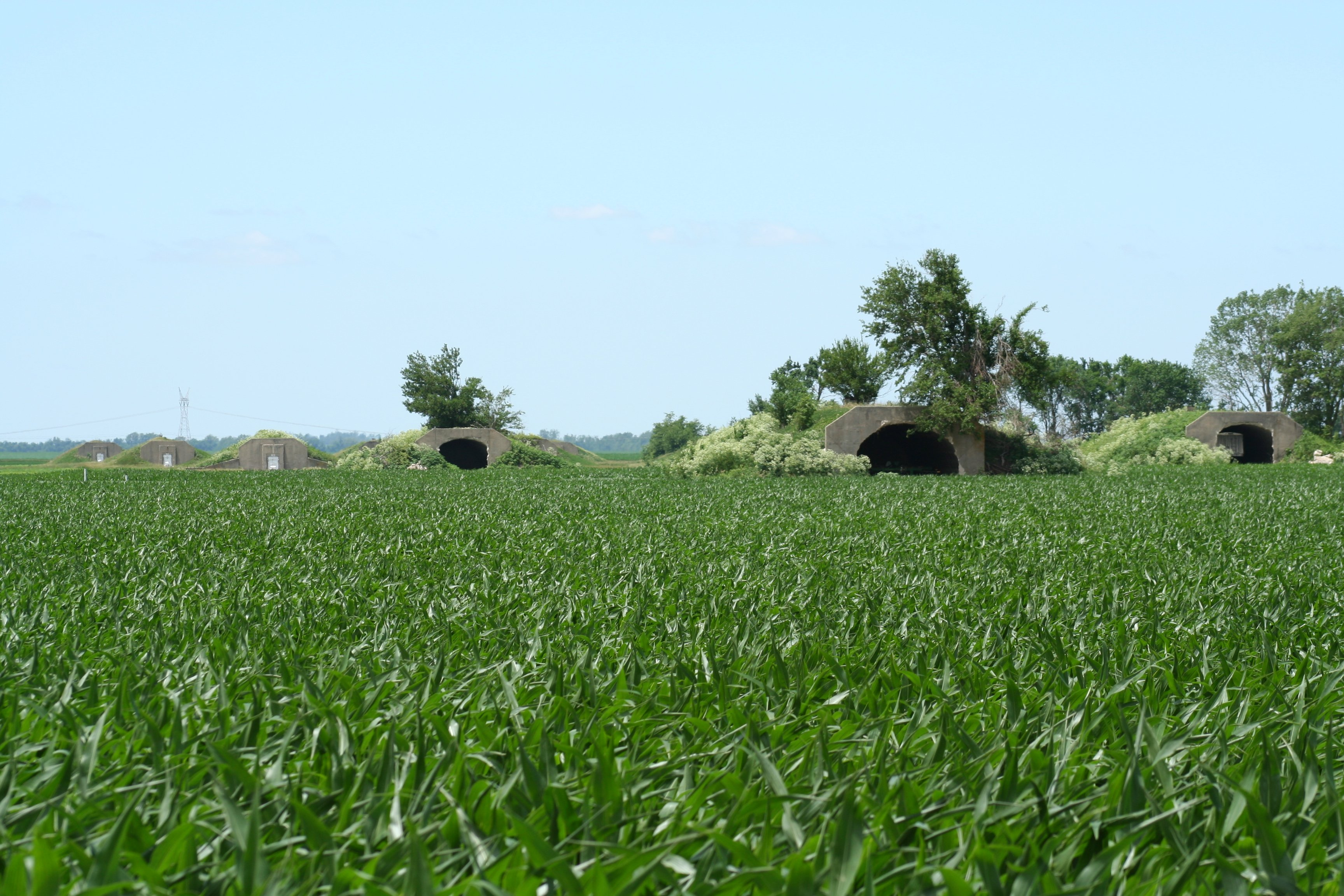
Abandoned bunkers in a corn field, 2007

The Sangamon Ordnance Plant was a United States Army ammunition manufacturing facility constructed and operated during World War II. It was located west of Illiopolis in Sangamon County, Illinois encompassing 20,000 acres (80 km^{2}). It began as two separate plants, the Sangamon and the Oak Ordnance Plants, separated by Illinois Route 36 and operated by Remington Rand and Johnson & Johnson respectively. Prior to the end of World War II, the facility was consolidated into the Sangamon Ordnance Plant, operated by Remington Rand.

== History ==
Location in Illinois

Construction began in early 1942 following the acquisition of local farms through eminent domain with the ground breaking occurring in April 1942. Around 15,000 workers were employed and construction was largely completed by September 1942 at a cost of $35 million. It employed thousands during the war including many Woman Ordnance Workers (WOW) and produced 20, 57, 75, 90 millimeter as well as 3 inch (76 mm) armor-piercing and high-explosive artillery shells. It also produced bomb fuses and the core of fire bombs known as "bursters."

=== Transportation for workers of the Sangamon Ammunition Plant ===
The Illinois Terminal used IRT Second Avenue Elevated coaches to connect the Illiopolis Plant with Springfield. Some other photographs show that the IRT cars were rigged with trolley poles for the job to obtain power for car lighting and heating. At the end of WWII the Defense Plant Corporation discarded these cars from the various plants after the war. These cars apparently were used in numerous Defense Plant installations around the country including in the San Francisco Bay area and at Little Rock, Arkansas. American Car and Foundry adapted the sets that were to be used by Illinois Terminal R.R. at Springfield, IL. They were indeed quite an odd sight out in the Midwest, as both architecturally and operationally they were nothing like the IT's standard coaches & trailers, especially lacking passenger steps at the side doors, so IT likely had to install temporary high level platforms to allow the passengers to entrain and detrain from the cars. Note the "B" class freight motor in the article reference below handling the trains. There currently is a "B" Class like this at the Illinois Railway Museum that served on this line.

== Incidents ==
In October 1942, $20,000 cash intended for the payroll of the two ordnance plants was stolen from a courier en route to the Farmers State Bank of Illiopolis from the Post Office.

In August 1943, an artillery shell exploded at the Oak ordnance plant, killing Maurice Pryor age 22 of Springfield and injuring ten others.

== Disposition ==
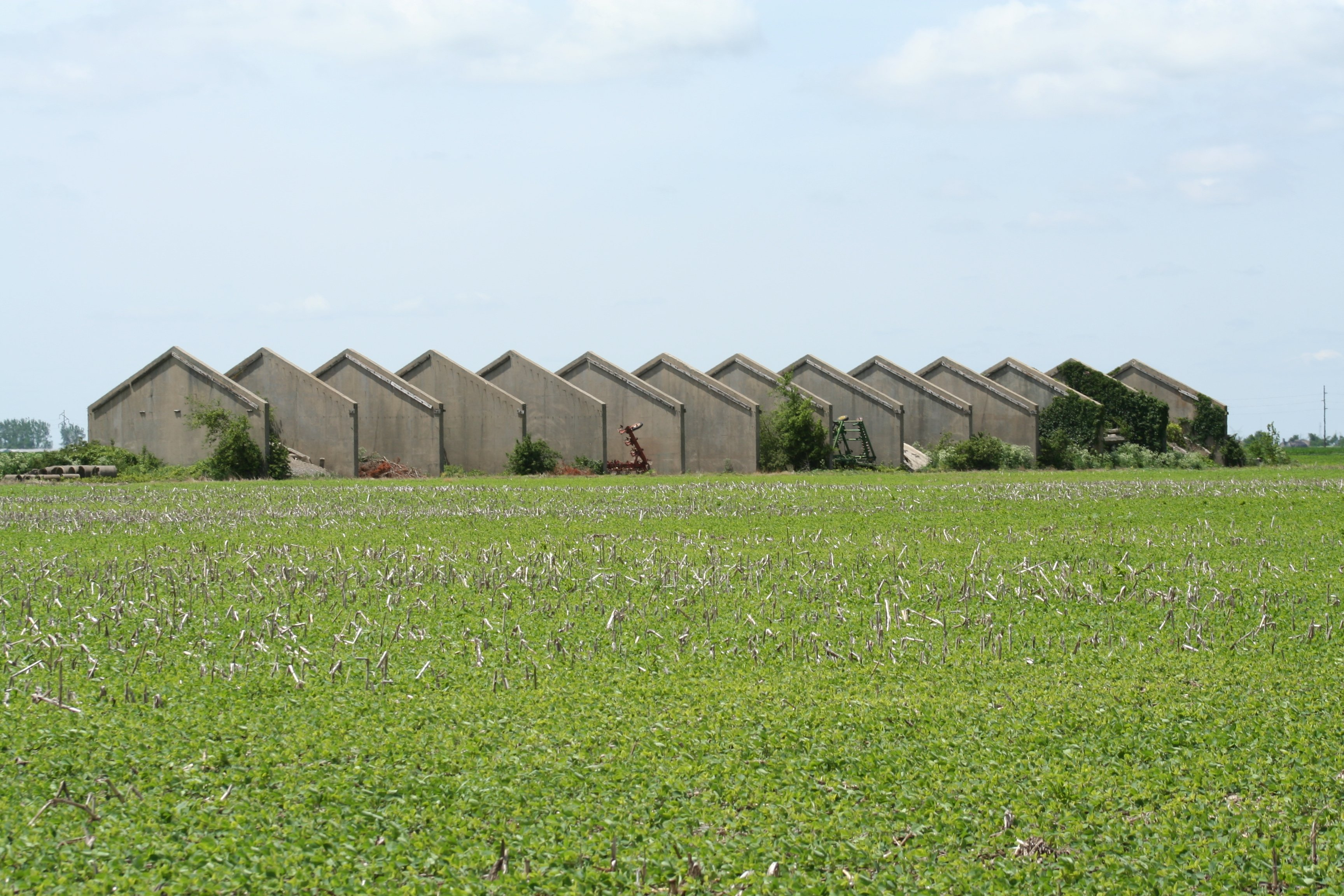
The ruins of the Sangamon Ordnance Plant, closed following World War II lie west of Illiopolis.

Following World War II, the facility closed and was mostly dismantled, though some parts still remain. A large portion of the site has returned to farmland. By June 1949, 90% of farmland had returned to production. The land had cost the government $3,186,922, but was sold for $2,126,490, mostly to former owners. The Federal Works Agency received 359 buildings which were dismantled and removed many for use at schools and colleges.

Six warehouses were dismantled and reassembled at the Springfield, Illinois airport. Numerous wood-frame buildings were dismantled so that surplus lumber could be used for the veterans emergency housing program.

In January 1948, it was announced that 553 acres (2.24 km^{2}) of the site and eight buildings were sold to the DeKalb Hybrid Seed Company for $98,000 to be used in a poultry breeding operation.

The last surplus property was sold by April 15, 1948.
