= Kohn Gallery =

Art gallery in Los Angeles, California

- Established: 1985
- Location: 1227 N Highland Ave, Los Angeles, CA 90038
- Coordinates: 34.09320°N 118.33911°W
- Director: Michael Kohn
- Architect: Lester Tobias

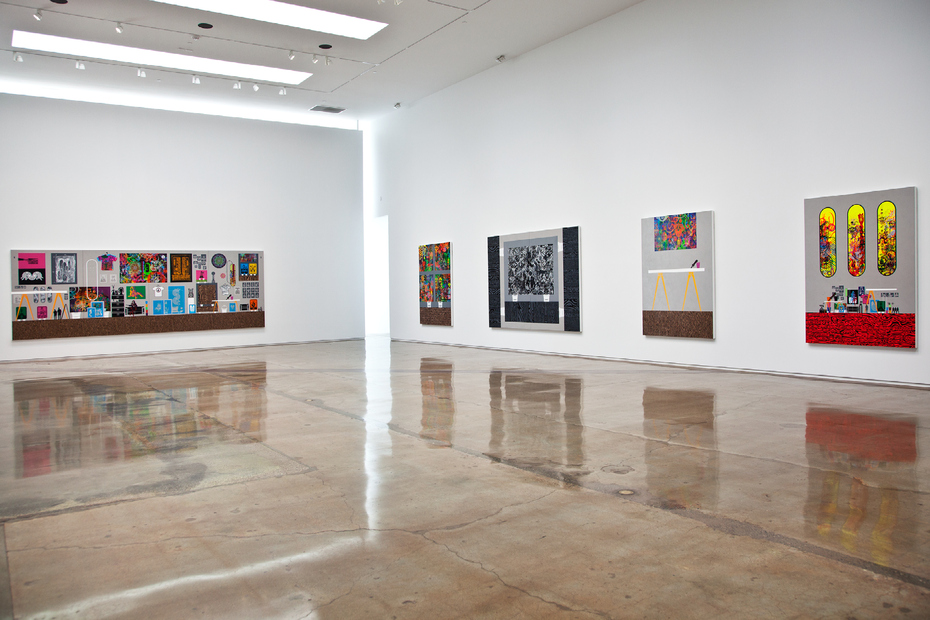
Installation view, Kohn Gallery, Los Angeles

Kohn Gallery is an art gallery established in 1985 in Hollywood, California. The space, under the direction of gallerist Michael Kohn, has exhibited works by seminal Pop artist Wallace Berman, Colombian painter María Berrío, polymath artist Enríque Martínez Celaya, German painter Rosa Loy, American abstract painter Ed Moses, Pop/graffiti artist Keith Haring and numerous other artists. In addition to presenting exhibitions of contemporary art, the gallery also represents the estates of historically relevant West coast artists, including Ed Moses and John Altoon.

Guest curators at the gallery have included journalist, critic, and curator Kristine McKenna, New York artist Heidi Hahn, and West Coast Pop artist Tony Berlant.

One of the gallery's inaugural exhibitions in 1986 included Andy Warhol's Campbell’s Soup Boxes.

== Background ==
The gallery was founded by Michael Kohn, former Flash Art Magazine editor and art critic for Arts Magazine. The gallery has existed in its current location since 2014. The building had previously been used as a printing press facility.

In 2010, the business celebrated its 25th anniversary with Katy Perry, Russell Brand, Clifford Einstein, Ellen DeGeneres, Portia de Rossi, and other public figures in attendance.

In 2015, the Wall Street Journal dubbed the gallery "among the most important showcases of modern art on the West Coast."

== In media ==
In June 2016, the gallery was featured on the podcast You Can't Eat the Sunshine in celebration and exploration of the gallery's major exhibition of Wallace Berman's work.
