= Sterling, Illinois =

City in Illinois, United States

- City
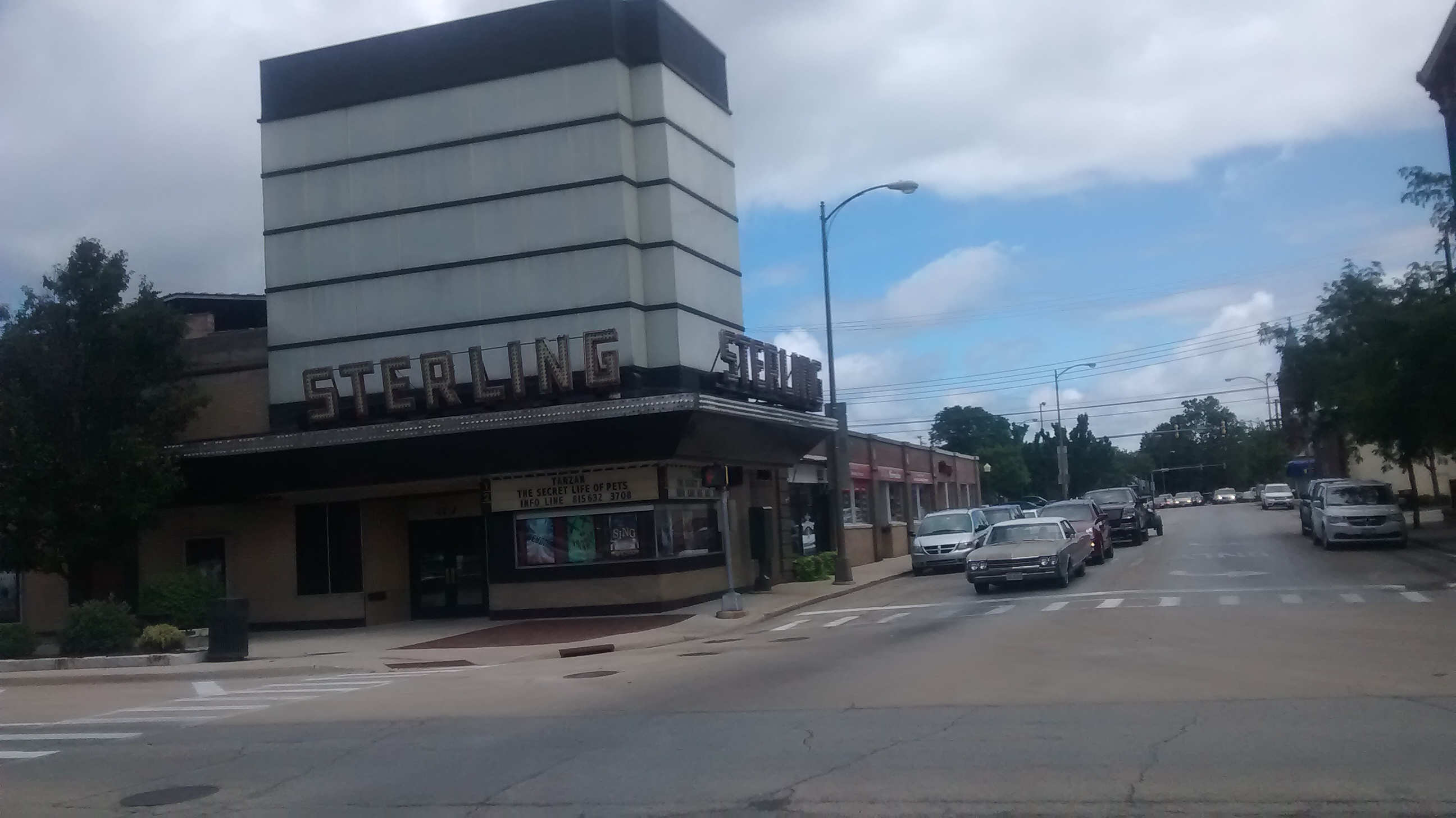
- Theater in Sterling
- Interactive map of Sterling, Illinois
- Location within Illinois Location within the United States
- Coordinates: 41°47′32″N 89°43′36″W
- Country: United States
- State: Illinois
- County: Whiteside

Area
  - Total: 6.16 sq mi (15.96 km^{2})
  - Land: 5.95 sq mi (15.40 km^{2})
  - Water: 0.22 sq mi (0.57 km^{2})
- Elevation: 676 ft (206 m)

Population (2020)
  - Total: 14,764
  - Density: 2,483.2/sq mi (958.75/km^{2})
- Time zone: UTC−6 (CST)
  - Summer (DST): UTC−5 (CDT)
- ZIP Code(s): 61081, 61082
- Area code: 815
- FIPS code: 17-72546
- GNIS feature ID: 2395965
- Website: City of Sterling Website

Sterling is a city in Whiteside County, Illinois, United States, along the Rock River. The population was 14,782 at the 2020 census, down from 15,370 in 2010. Formerly nicknamed "The Heart of American Hardware," the city has long been associated with manufacturing and the steel industry.

== History ==
In 1834, Hezekiah Brink built the first cabin in what was to become Harrisburg. Two years later, William Kirkpatrick settled downstream in an area that became Chatham. In 1838, Harrisburg and Chatham merged to become the Town of Sterling in an effort to become the county seat. The name Sterling was chosen to honor Major James Sterling, who distinguished himself in the area during the Blackhawk War in 1832. On February 16, 1857, Sterling was incorporated as a city by state law.

On July 18, 1856, Abraham Lincoln visited Sterling to speak at a rally for the presidential candidate John C. Fremont. He spent the night at the home of Sheriff William Manahan, which has since been preserved and renovated into the Lincoln-Manahan Home. He gave his speech in Propheter Park, where a statue has been erected in his honor.

The Rock River failed to become a major navigational route as once hoped, but it provided power for the saw and grist mills, and later to a booming industrial base. In 1856, the first rail lines were laid in the area. With the power from the river and the transportation provided by the railroads, Sterling's business and industry grew. During the late 19th and early 20th century, the community's industrial bedrock was laid with the founding of Northwestern Steel & Wire Co., Lawrence Brothers Inc, National Manufacturing Co., The Frantz Manufacturing Company, and the Wahl Clipper Corporation.

Sterling has diversified and adapted to the 21st century. Its industrial base has expanded; the city has filled two industrial parks and made development for a third and fourth. Retail sales for the region have expanded as Sterling has emerged as a regional retail hub. Outside the city, the landscape is dominated by agricultural fields that typify most of the Midwest.

The cities of Sterling, Nebraska, and Sterling, Colorado, were both founded by former residents of Sterling, Illinois, as they branched out across the West.

== Geography ==
Sterling lies along the north bank of the Rock River, opposite its twin city, Rock Falls. The terrain is mostly flat. The land immediately outside of town is almost entirely farmland. The prairie soil is part of one of the world's most fertile growing areas. According to the 2010 census, Sterling has a total area of 5.943 square miles (15.39 km^{2}), of which 5.71 square miles (14.79 km^{2}) (or 96.08%) is land and 0.233 square miles (0.60 km^{2}) (or 3.92%) is water.

== Demographics ==
Historical population
Census	Pop.	Note	%±
1860	2,428		—
1870	3,998		64.7%
1880	5,087		27.2%
1890	5,824		14.5%
1900	6,309		8.3%
1910	7,467		18.4%
1920	8,182		9.6%
1930	10,012		22.4%
1940	11,363		13.5%
1950	12,817		12.8%
1960	15,688		22.4%
1970	16,113		2.7%
1980	16,281		1.0%
1990	15,132		−7.1%
2000	15,451		2.1%
2010	15,370		−0.5%
2020	14,764		−3.9%
U.S. Decennial Census

=== Racial and ethnic composition ===
Sterling city, Illinois – Racial and ethnic composition Note: the US Census treats Hispanic/Latino as an ethnic category. This table excludes Latinos from the racial categories and assigns them to a separate category. Hispanics/Latinos may be of any race.
Race / Ethnicity (NH = Non-Hispanic)	Pop 2000	Pop 2010	Pop 2020	% 2000	% 2010	% 2020
White alone (NH)	11,848	10,855	9,644	76.68%	70.62%	65.32%
Black or African American alone (NH)	325	411	394	2.10%	2.67%	2.67%
Native American or Alaska Native alone (NH)	30	15	16	0.19%	0.10%	0.11%
Asian alone (NH)	123	102	150	0.80%	0.66%	1.02%
Native Hawaiian or Pacific Islander alone (NH)	0	0	5	0.00%	0.00%	0.03%
Other race alone (NH)	8	20	37	0.05%	0.13%	0.25%
Mixed race or Multiracial (NH)	144	252	574	0.93%	1.64%	3.89%
Hispanic or Latino (any race)	2,973	3,715	3,944	19.24%	24.17%	26.71%
Total	15,451	15,370	14,764	100.00%	100.00%	100.00%

=== 2020 census ===
As of the 2020 census, Sterling had a population of 14,764. The median age was 41.1 years. 22.6% of residents were under the age of 18 and 20.7% of residents were 65 years of age or older. For every 100 females, there were 92.8 males, and for every 100 females age 18 and over there were 90.1 males age 18 and over.

99.9% of residents lived in urban areas, while 0.1% lived in rural areas.

There were 6,420 households in Sterling, of which 27.7% had children under the age of 18 living in them. Of all households, 35.6% were married-couple households, 21.3% were households with a male householder and no spouse or partner present, and 34.5% were households with a female householder and no spouse or partner present. About 37.5% of all households were made up of individuals, and 17.2% had someone living alone who was 65 years of age or older.

There were 7,070 housing units, of which 9.2% were vacant. The homeowner vacancy rate was 3.4% and the rental vacancy rate was 7.6%.

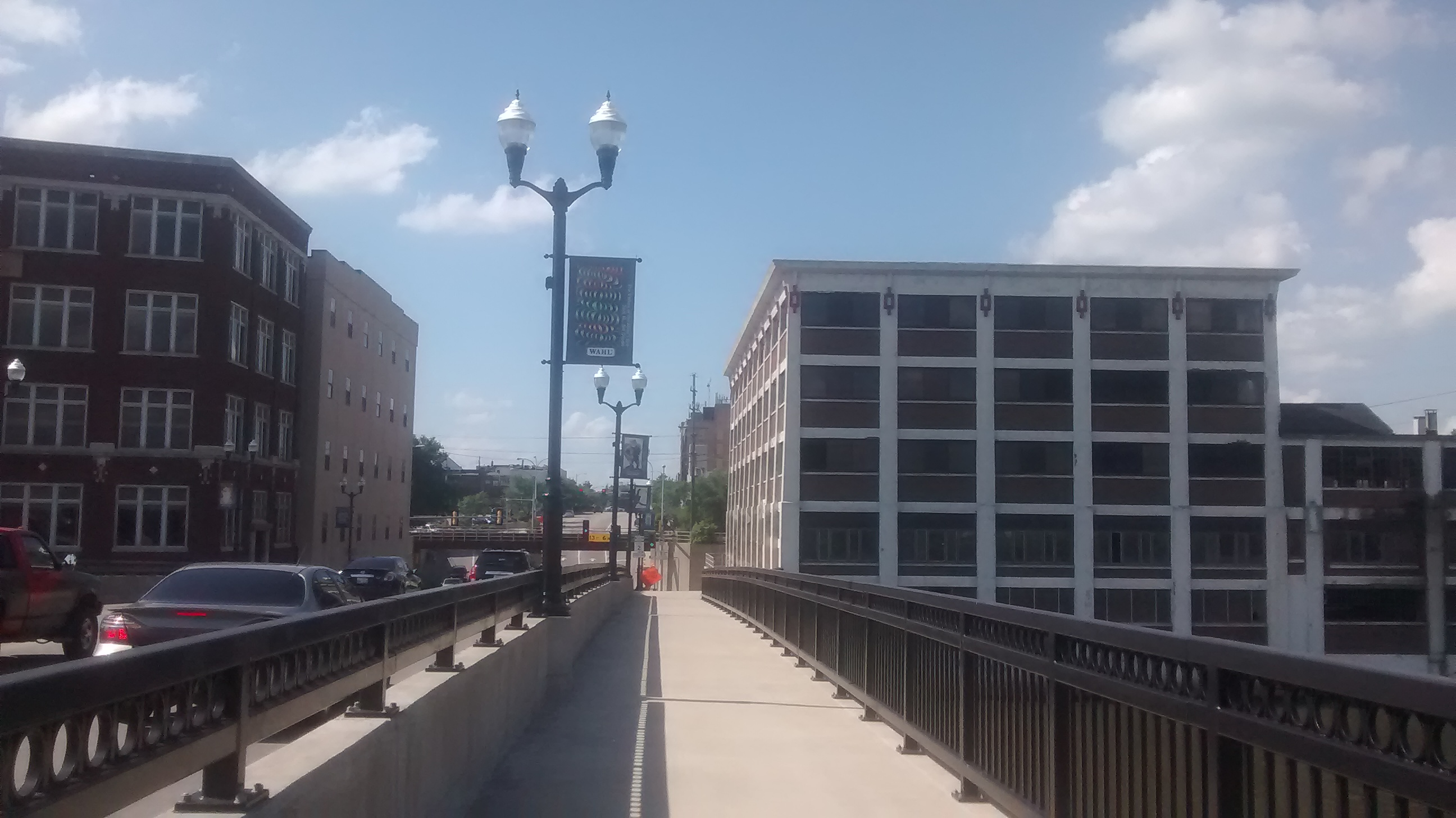
The Lawrence Hardware building (right) overlooking the bridge to Rock Falls, Illinois

=== 2000 census ===
As of the census of 2000, there were 15,596 people, 6,234 households, and 3,946 families residing in the city. The population density was 3,307.0 inhabitants per square mile (1,276.8/km^{2}). There were 6,596 housing units at an average density of 1,411.8 per square mile (545.1/km^{2}). The racial makeup of the city was 84.36% White, 2.25% African American, 0.41% Native American, 0.81% Asian, 0.01% Pacific Islander, 9.82% from other races, and 2.35% from two or more races. Hispanic or Latino of any race were 19.24% of the population.

There were 6,234 households, out of which 30.3% had children under the age of 18 living with them, 47.2% were married couples living together, 12.2% had a female householder with no husband present, and 36.7% were non-families. 31.4% of all households were made up of individuals, and 14.0% had someone living alone who was 65 years of age or older. The average household size was 2.41 and the average family size was 3.04.

In the city, the population was spread out across age groups, with 25.1% under the age of 18, 9.5% from 18 to 24, 28.7% from 25 to 44, 19.8% from 45 to 64, and 16.9% who were 65 years of age or older. The median age was 36 years. For every 100 females, there were 90.9 males. For every 100 females age 18 and over, there were 86.9 males.

The median income for a household in the city was $37,664, and the median income for a family was $45,531. Males had a median income of $33,047 versus $21,944 for females. The per capita income for the city was $19,432. About 7.6% of families and 10.8% of the population were below the poverty line, including 17.0% of those under age 18 and 5.4% of those age 65 or over.

== Education ==
Sterling is served by Sterling Community Unit District 5, which operates Sterling High School, Challand Middle School, Franklin Elementary, Jefferson Elementary, Lincoln Elementary, and Washington Elementary Schools. Wallace School serves as Sterling's public pre-K institution, along with classrooms in Franklin and Jefferson Elementary Schools.

Sterling is also home to the Whiteside Area Career Center, adjacent to Sterling High School. WACC hosts a variety of vocational courses, available to students of its member schools in the Sauk Valley.

The Roman Catholic Diocese of Rockford runs two schools in the city: St. Mary's School, serving as both grade school and middle school, and Newman Central Catholic High School. These schools serve both local parishes, Sacred Heart Church and St. Mary's Church.

Christ Lutheran, a Protestant school affiliated with the Lutheran Church Missouri Synod, serves students from age 3 through 8th grade.

== Notable people ==
- Frances Cleveland Axtell, legislator; born in Sterling
- Chris Birch, Alaska Senator
- Terry Brooks, fantasy author
- Keith L. Brown, United States diplomat
- Clarence Clinton Coe, member of the Wisconsin State Assembly
- Steve Eddy, pitcher with the California Angels
- Don E. Fehrenbacher, historian of politics, slavery, and Abraham Lincoln, born in Sterling
- Virgil Ferguson, state senator, spent most of adult life in Sterling
- Paul J. Flory, Nobel laureate in chemistry; born in Sterling
- Mike Foltynewicz, pitcher for the Houston Astros and Atlanta Braves; born in Sterling
- Austin Hubbard, mixed martial artist competitor; born in Sterling
- Jakob Junis, pitcher for the Kansas City Royals, San Francisco Giants
- Caroline Kent, abstract artist; born in Sterling
- Dan Kolb, pitcher for the several teams; born in Sterling
- Jon Krick, Football player
- Tim Lawson, author
- Joel Ryce-Menuhin, classical pianist and psychologist
- Harry B. Mulliken, early 20th century New York City architect; born in Sterling
- Michael Bryan Murphy, musician; former lead singer for REO Speedwagon
- Kenje Ogata, dentist; Japanese-American WWII pilot
- Barbara Riley, author
- Lexi Rodriguez, former Nebraska Cornhusker volleyball player, Current LOVB Omaha Player
- Jigar Shah, clean energy entrepreneur
- LeRoy Walters, professor of bioethics and Christian ethics
- Jacqueline Grennan Wexler, American Roman Catholic nun and academic administrator
- Jesse Lynch Williams, awarded the first Pulitzer Prize for Drama in 1918

== See also ==
- Northwestern Steel and Wire
- Paul W. Dillon Home
- Edward N. Kirk
- Newman Central Catholic High School
