= National Register of Historic Places listings in Sangamon County, Illinois =

Location of Sangamon County in Illinois

This is a list of the National Register of Historic Places listings in Sangamon County, Illinois.

This is intended to be a complete list of the properties and districts on the National Register of Historic Places in Sangamon County, Illinois, United States. Latitude and longitude coordinates are provided for many National Register properties and districts; these locations may be seen together in a map.

There are 64 properties and districts listed on the National Register in the county, including 5 National Historic Landmarks. Another property was once listed but has been removed.

This National Park Service list is complete through NPS recent listings posted August 21, 2026.

== Current listings ==
	Name on the Register	Image	Date listed	Location	City or town	Description
1	Bolivia Road Bridge	Bolivia Road Bridge	January 28, 2004 (#03001464)	Across the North Fork of the Sangamon River; 39°46′03″N 89°20′44″W	Bolivia	Extends into Christian County
2	H. P. Boult House	H. P. Boult House	June 3, 1982 (#82002598)	1123 S. 2nd St. 39°47′19″N 89°39′14″W	Springfield	
3	Bressmer-Baker House	Bressmer-Baker House	June 29, 1982 (#82002599)	913 6th St. 39°47′32″N 89°38′54″W	Springfield	
4	John F. Bretz House and Warehouse	John F. Bretz House and Warehouse	August 10, 2000 (#00000945)	1113 N. Fifth St. 39°48′50″N 89°38′58″W	Springfield	
5	George M. Brinkerhoff House	George M. Brinkerhoff House	December 18, 1978 (#78001186)	1500 N. 5th St. 39°49′16″N 89°38′54″W	Springfield	
6	Brunk Farmstead	Brunk Farmstead	December 17, 1999 (#99001569)	KOA Campground Rd., 1 mile south of E. Lake Dr. 39°41′51″N 89°35′12″W	Rochester	
7	Caldwell Farmstead	Caldwell Farmstead	August 16, 1984 (#84001145)	Illinois Route 4; 39°42′09″N 89°42′21″W	Chatham	
8	Camp Butler National Cemetery	Camp Butler National Cemetery	August 15, 1997 (#97000891)	5063 Camp Butler Rd. 39°49′58″N 89°33′21″W	Clear Lake Township	
9	Camp Lincoln Commissary Building	Camp Lincoln Commissary Building	November 13, 1984 (#84000333)	1301 N. MacArthur Boulevard; 39°49′15″N 89°40′08″W	Springfield	
10	Central Springfield Historic District	Central Springfield Historic District	August 29, 1978 (#78001187)	Roughly bounded by 14th, 7th, Jefferson, and Washington Sts.; also 6th St. from Capitol to Monroe St.; also roughly Jefferson, Jackson, 2nd & 7th Sts. 39°48′01″N 89°38′56″W	Springfield	Second set of boundaries represents a boundary increase of November 19, 1986; third set of boundaries represents a boundary increase of April 26, 2016
11	Christ Episcopal Church	Christ Episcopal Church	September 12, 1980 (#80001410)	611 E. Jackson St. 39°47′50″N 89°38′51″W	Springfield	
12	Clayville Tavern	Clayville Tavern	May 8, 1973 (#73000718)	0.5 miles southeast of Pleasant Plains on Illinois Route 125; 39°52′00″N 89°53′49″W	Pleasant Plains	
13	Dr. Charles Compton House	Dr. Charles Compton House	May 8, 2017 (#100000964)	1303 S. Wiggins; 39°47′11″N 89°40′46″W	Springfield	
14	Susan Lawrence Dana House	Susan Lawrence Dana House	July 30, 1974 (#74000774)	301 Lawrence Ave. 39°47′39″N 89°39′05″W	Springfield	
15	Edwards Place	Edwards Place	December 17, 1969 (#69000058)	700 N. 4th St. 39°48′34″N 89°39′01″W	Springfield	
16	Executive Mansion	Executive Mansion	July 19, 1976 (#76000728)	4th and Jackson Sts. 39°47′48″N 89°39′00″W	Springfield	
17	Fisher Building-Latham Block	Fisher Building-Latham Block	April 28, 2000 (#00000411)	111, 113, and 115 N. 6th St. 39°48′08″N 89°38′53″W	Springfield	
18	Cornelius Flagg Farmstead	Cornelius Flagg Farmstead	February 3, 1993 (#92001848)	Tipton School Rd., 0.4 miles (0.64 km) west of Interstate 55 Business and 0.4 miles south of Andrew Rd. 39°53′27″N 89°36′57″W	Sherman	
19	Clarkson W. Freeman House	Clarkson W. Freeman House	September 29, 1980 (#80001411)	704 W. Monroe St. 39°47′57″N 89°39′49″W	Springfield	
20	Hugh M. Garvey House	Hugh M. Garvey House	November 10, 2009 (#09000898)	8 Fair Oaks Dr. 39°46′54″N 89°41′13″W	Leland Grove	
21	Fred Gottschalk Grocery Store	Fred Gottschalk Grocery Store	March 18, 1985 (#85000607)	301 W. Edwards St. 39°47′47″N 89°39′28″W	Springfield	
22	Cong. James M. Graham House	Cong. James M. Graham House	May 1, 1989 (#89000342)	413 S. 7th St. 39°47′52″N 89°38′48″W	Springfield	
23	Great Western Railroad Depot	Great Western Railroad Depot	August 25, 2014 (#14000510)	930 E. Monroe St. 39°47′57″N 89°38′33″W	Springfield	
24	Heimberger House	Heimberger House	April 21, 2014 (#14000154)	653-655 W. Vine St. 39°47′18″N 89°39′55″W	Springfield	
25	Hickox Apartments	Hickox Apartments	November 13, 1984 (#84000337)	4th and Cook Sts. 39°47′43″N 89°39′04″W	Springfield	
26	Virgil Hickox House	Virgil Hickox House	March 5, 1982 (#82002600)	518 E. Capitol Ave. 39°47′53″N 89°38′55″W	Springfield	
27	Elijah Iles House	Elijah Iles House	February 23, 1978 (#78001188)	628 S. 7th St. 39°47′43″N 89°38′47″W	Springfield	
28	Illinois Department of Mines and Minerals-Springfield Mine Rescue Station	Illinois Department of Mines and Minerals-Springfield Mine Rescue Station	July 5, 1985 (#85001481)	609 Princeton Ave. 39°46′29″N 89°38′53″W	Springfield	
29	Illinois Route 4-North of Auburn	Illinois Route 4-North of Auburn	August 6, 1998 (#98000979)	Curran and Snell Rd. 39°37′01″N 89°44′48″W	Auburn	
30	Illinois State Capitol	Illinois State Capitol	November 21, 1985 (#85003178)	Capitol Ave. and 2nd St. 39°47′54″N 89°39′16″W	Springfield	
31	Illinois State Fairgrounds	Illinois State Fairgrounds	May 14, 1990 (#90000720)	Junction of Sangamon Ave. and Peoria Rd. 39°50′11″N 89°38′27″W	Springfield	
32	Jennings Ford Automobile Dealership	Jennings Ford Automobile Dealership	May 31, 2006 (#06000450)	431 S. 4th St. 39°47′51″N 89°39′04″W	Springfield	
33	Alvin S. Keys House	Alvin S. Keys House	May 6, 1994 (#94000432)	1600 Park Dr. 39°46′55″N 89°41′03″W	Leland Grove	
34	Lazy A Motel	Lazy A Motel	November 8, 1994 (#94001268)	2840 Peoria Rd. 39°50′21″N 89°37′59″W	Springfield	
35	John L. Lewis House	John L. Lewis House	September 10, 1979 (#79000867)	1132 W. Lawrence Ave. 39°47′38″N 89°40′22″W	Springfield	
36	Lincoln Colored Home	Lincoln Colored Home	August 6, 1998 (#98000985)	427 S. 12th St. 39°47′51″N 89°38′23″W	Springfield	
37	Lincoln Home National Historic Site	Lincoln Home National Historic Site	August 18, 1971 (#71000076)	8th and Jackson Sts. 39°47′50″N 89°38′41″W	Springfield	
38	Lincoln Tomb	Lincoln Tomb	October 15, 1966 (#66000330)	Oak Ridge Cemetery; 39°49′23″N 89°39′23″W	Springfield	
39	Abraham Lincoln Memorial Garden	Abraham Lincoln Memorial Garden	August 12, 1992 (#92001016)	2301 E. Lake Dr. 39°41′51″N 89°35′46″W	Springfield	
40	Vachel Lindsay House	Vachel Lindsay House	November 11, 1971 (#71000297)	603 S. 5th St. 39°47′45″N 89°38′59″W	Springfield	
41	Maid-Rite Sandwich Shop	Maid-Rite Sandwich Shop	August 16, 1984 (#84001146)	118 N. Pasfield St. 39°48′09″N 89°39′30″W	Springfield	
42	Bell Miller Apartments	Bell Miller Apartments	November 7, 1995 (#95001242)	835 S. 2nd St. 39°47′33″N 89°39′14″W	Springfield	
43	Joseph Miller House		November 24, 1980 (#80001408)	Buckhart Rd. 39°45′26″N 89°28′28″W	Rochester	
44	Oak Ridge Cemetery	Oak Ridge Cemetery	August 4, 1995 (#95000986)	1441 Monument Ave. 39°49′25″N 89°39′28″W	Springfield	
45	Old State Capitol	Old State Capitol	October 15, 1966 (#66000331)	Bounded by 5th, 6th, Adams, and Washington Sts. 39°48′04″N 89°38′53″W	Springfield	
46	Power Farmstead	Power Farmstead	May 1, 1989 (#89000341)	County Road 9500N, 0.5 miles east of Cantrall; 39°56′39″N 89°39′45″W	Cantrall	
47	Price-Prather House	Price-Prather House	May 13, 1991 (#91000574)	Junction of Main and Elkhart Sts. 39°57′17″N 89°32′47″W	Williamsville	
48	Price/Wheeler House	Price/Wheeler House	February 14, 1985 (#85000269)	618 S. 7th St. 39°47′43″N 89°38′46″W	Springfield	
49	Rippon-Kinsella House	Rippon-Kinsella House	February 27, 1992 (#92000073)	1317 N. Third St. 39°49′01″N 89°39′06″W	Springfield	
50	Joseph Ross House	Joseph Ross House	March 2, 2006 (#06000092)	5200 Passfield Rd. 39°43′41″N 89°26′04″W	Rochester	
51	Route 66 by Carpenter Park	Route 66 by Carpenter Park	May 9, 2002 (#02000461)	Old U.S. Route 66 between Cabin Smoke Trail and north bank of the Sangamon River; 39°52′21″N 89°36′51″W	Springfield	
52	Route 66 South of Lake Springfield	Route 66 South of Lake Springfield	May 12, 2009 (#09000296)	Old U.S. Route 66/Olde Carriage Way; 39°40′31″N 89°37′29″W	Springfield	
53	St. Nicholas Hotel	St. Nicholas Hotel	February 10, 1983 (#83000336)	400 E. Jefferson St. 39°48′09″N 89°39′01″W	Springfield	
54	Strawbridge-Shepherd House	Strawbridge-Shepherd House	June 8, 2015 (#15000317)	5255 Shepherd Rd. 39°43′22″N 89°37′00″W	Springfield	
55	Sugar Creek Covered Bridge	Sugar Creek Covered Bridge	January 9, 1978 (#78001185)	Southeast of Chatham off Interstate 55; 39°38′25″N 89°39′43″W	Chatham	
56	Taft Farmstead	Taft Farmstead	November 20, 1980 (#80001409)	County Road 3; 39°45′08″N 89°33′34″W	Rochester	
57	Taylor Apartments	Taylor Apartments	September 15, 2004 (#04000976)	117 S. Grand Ave. W 39°47′14″N 89°39′20″W	Springfield	
58	Tiger-Anderson House		June 11, 1986 (#86001316)	County Road 3 North; 39°50′39″N 89°42′31″W	Springfield	
59	Town House	Town House	June 3, 2005 (#05000603)	718 7th St. 39°47′39″N 89°38′47″W	Springfield	
60	Union Station	Union Station	November 27, 1978 (#78001189)	Madison St. 39°48′13″N 89°38′54″W	Springfield	
61	US ARMY Aircraft P-51D-25NA 44-73287	US ARMY Aircraft P-51D-25NA 44-73287	March 11, 1999 (#99000254)	Capital Airport, 0.5 miles north of the junction of Illinois Route 29 and Veterans Parkway; 39°50′27″N 89°40′33″W	Springfield	
62	Washington Park	Washington Park	May 22, 1992 (#92000483)	Bounded by Fayette Ave., Williams Boulevard, Walnut St., MacArthur Boulevard, S. Grand Ave. and Chatham Rd. 39°47′20″N 89°40′37″W	Springfield	
63	Howard K. Weber House	Howard K. Weber House	October 1, 1979 (#79000868)	925 S. 7th St. 39°47′31″N 89°38′49″W	Springfield	
64	Gov. Richard Yates House	Gov. Richard Yates House	March 1, 1984 (#84001148)	1190 Williams Boulevard; 39°47′24″N 89°40′20″W	Springfield	

== Former listing ==
	Name on the Register	Image	Date listed	Date removed	Location	City or town	Description
1	Wheeland Haven		March 12, 1985 (#85000557)	April 17, 2003	East of Riverton on Interstate 72	Riverton	Burned down in 1992

== See also ==
- List of National Historic Landmarks in Illinois
- National Register of Historic Places listings in Illinois
