= The Town House =

The Town House may refer to:

Places

- Townhouse Studios, recording studios in London, England officially named "The Town House"
- The Town House (Los Angeles, California), listed on the U.S. National Register of Historic Places (NRHP)
- The Town House (Springfield, Illinois), NRHP-listed

Other

- The Town House, 1959 historical novel by Norah Lofts
