= Caldwell Farmstead =

Historic house in Illinois, United States

- U.S. National Register of Historic Places
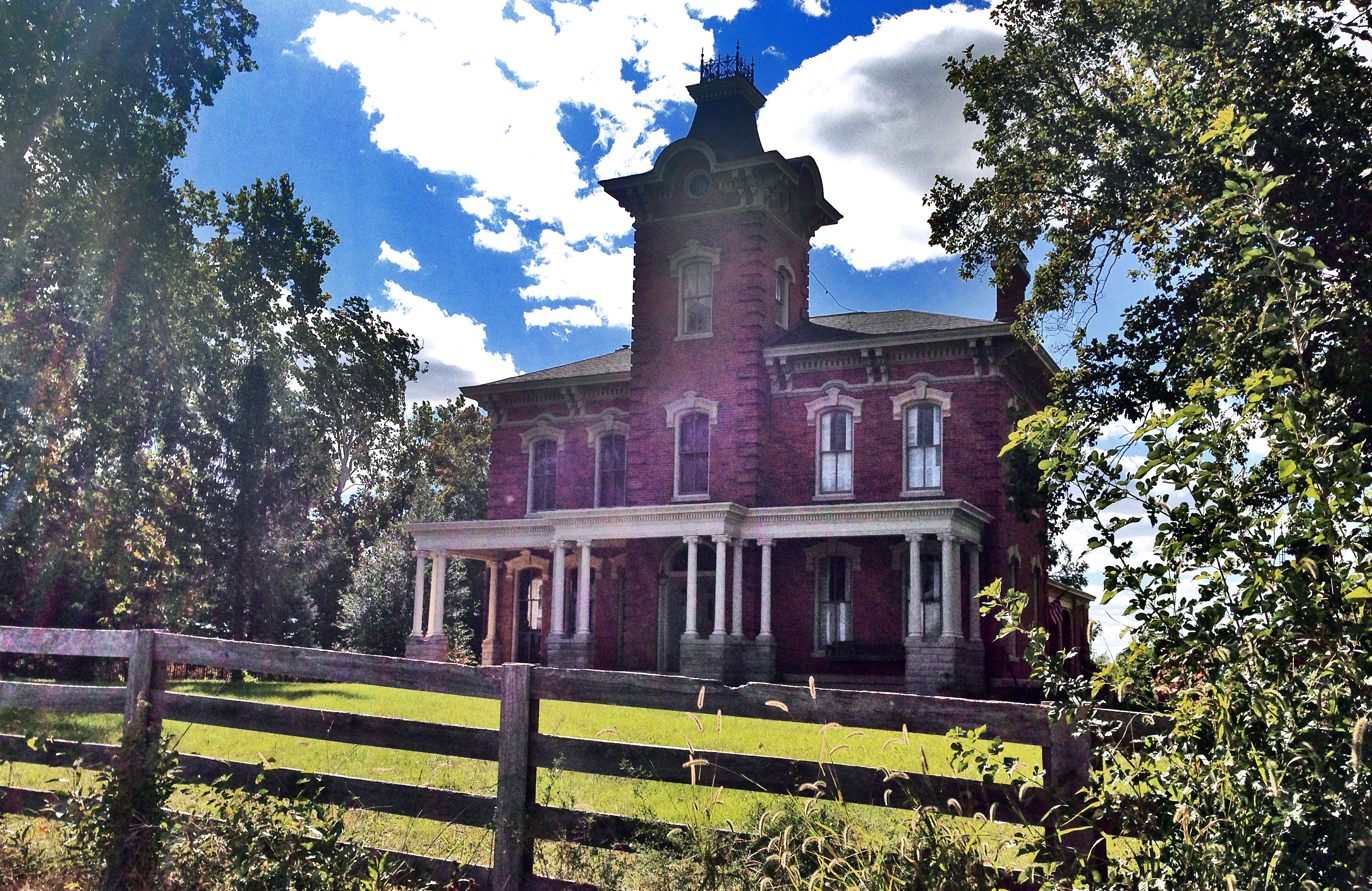

- Location within Illinois Location within the United States
- Nearest city: Chatham, Illinois
- Coordinates: 39°42′9″N 89°42′21″W
- Area: 1.9 acres (0.77 ha)
- Built: 1876
- Architectural style: Italianate
- NRHP reference No.: 84001145
- Added to NRHP: August 16, 1984

The Caldwell Farmstead is a historic farmhouse located on Illinois Route 4 north of Chatham, Sangamon County, Illinois. The two-story Towered Italianate house was built in 1876. The red brick house features detailed joint work on the corners and groups of tall windows with molded hoods. A front porch supported by Roman columns runs along the front of the house. Decorative brackets adorn the wide eaves of the house's hip roof. A three-story tower with a steeply sloped cupola, the principal element of the Towered Italianate style, rises above the front entrance. The house is one of the few Towered Italianate homes in Central Illinois; similarly styled homes in the Springfield area include the George M. Brinkerhoff House and the Rippon-Kinsella House.

The home was built in 1876 at a cost of $20,000, this mansion was the home of Benjamin F. Caldwell (1848–1924), who had careers as the president of the Farmer's State Bank in Springfield, and the Caldwell State Bank of Chatham, as well as having served in the Illinois House and Senate. Mr. Caldwell also represented Illinois in the U.S. House of Representatives from 1899 to 1905.

The house was added to the National Register of Historic Places on August 16, 1984.
