= Vachel Lindsay House =

Historic house in Illinois, United States

- U.S. National Register of Historic Places
- U.S. National Historic Landmark
- Illinois State Historic Site
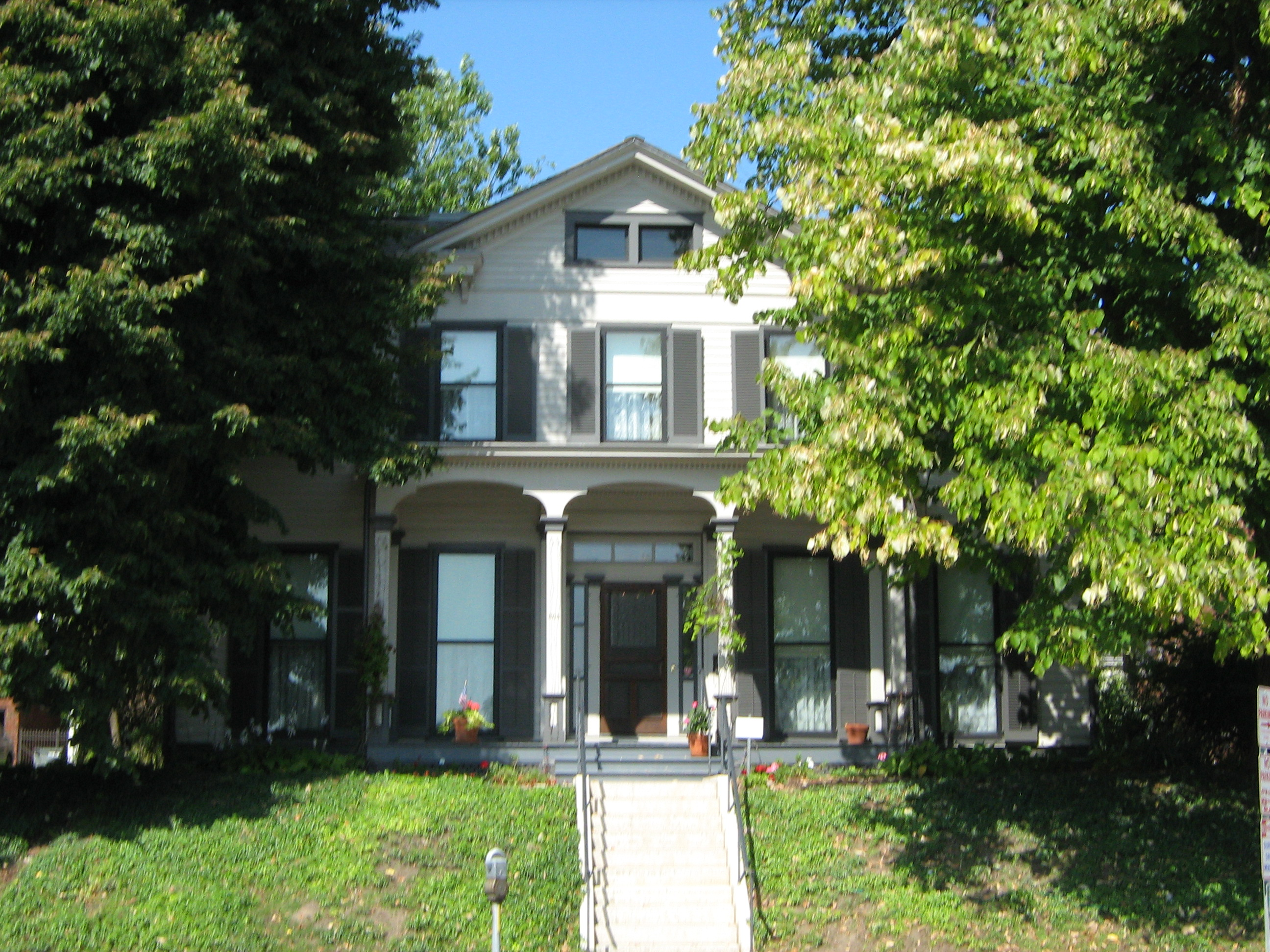
- Vachel Lindsay House

- Location within Illinois Location within the United States
- Location: 603 South Fifth Street, Springfield, Illinois
- Coordinates: 39°47′44.82″N 89°38′59.03″W
- Area: less than one acre
- Built: 1848
- Architect: Henry Dresser
- Architectural style: Greek Revival
- NRHP reference No.: 71000297

Significant dates
- Added to NRHP: November 11, 1971
- Designated NHL: November 11, 1971

The Vachel Lindsay House is a historic house museum at 603 South 5th Street in Springfield, Illinois. Built in 1848, it was the birthplace and lifelong home of poet Vachel Lindsay (1879–1931). It was declared a National Historic Landmark in 1971. The Illinois Historic Preservation Agency operates the house as a museum and offers tours of the home that emphasize Vachel Lindsay's poetry and art. It is open seasonally.

== Description and history ==
The Vachel Lindsay House is located near Springfield's downtown area, at the southwest corner of South 5th and East Edwards Streets. It is a two-story wood-frame structure, with a front-facing gable roof and clapboarded exterior. Its main facade is five bays wide, with a hip-roof single-story porch extending across the center three bays, with square posts and a dentillated cornice. The entrance is framed by a Greek Revival surround, but the doorway itself is a later Victorian feature. The first floor contains an entry hall, two parlors, library, dining room, kitchen, bathroom, and pantry. The second floor includes a central hall, sewing room, five bedrooms, bathroom, and trunk room. Rooms have been decorated in the late Victorian style, and included the bed in which Vachel Lindsay was born, a desk he built, and the table at which he did much of his writing.

Nicholas Vachel Lindsay was born here in 1879, and at first sought to become an artist. He discovered a talent for poetry, and his first volume was published in 1913. "The Congo", was published in 1914, and brought him fame. His approach to poetry was unusual and distinctive for the time, using colloquial language, which he delivered in a sing-song chanting style during his public appearances.

Lindsay's house was sold to a non-profit foundation by his heirs, and opened as a house museum in 1960.

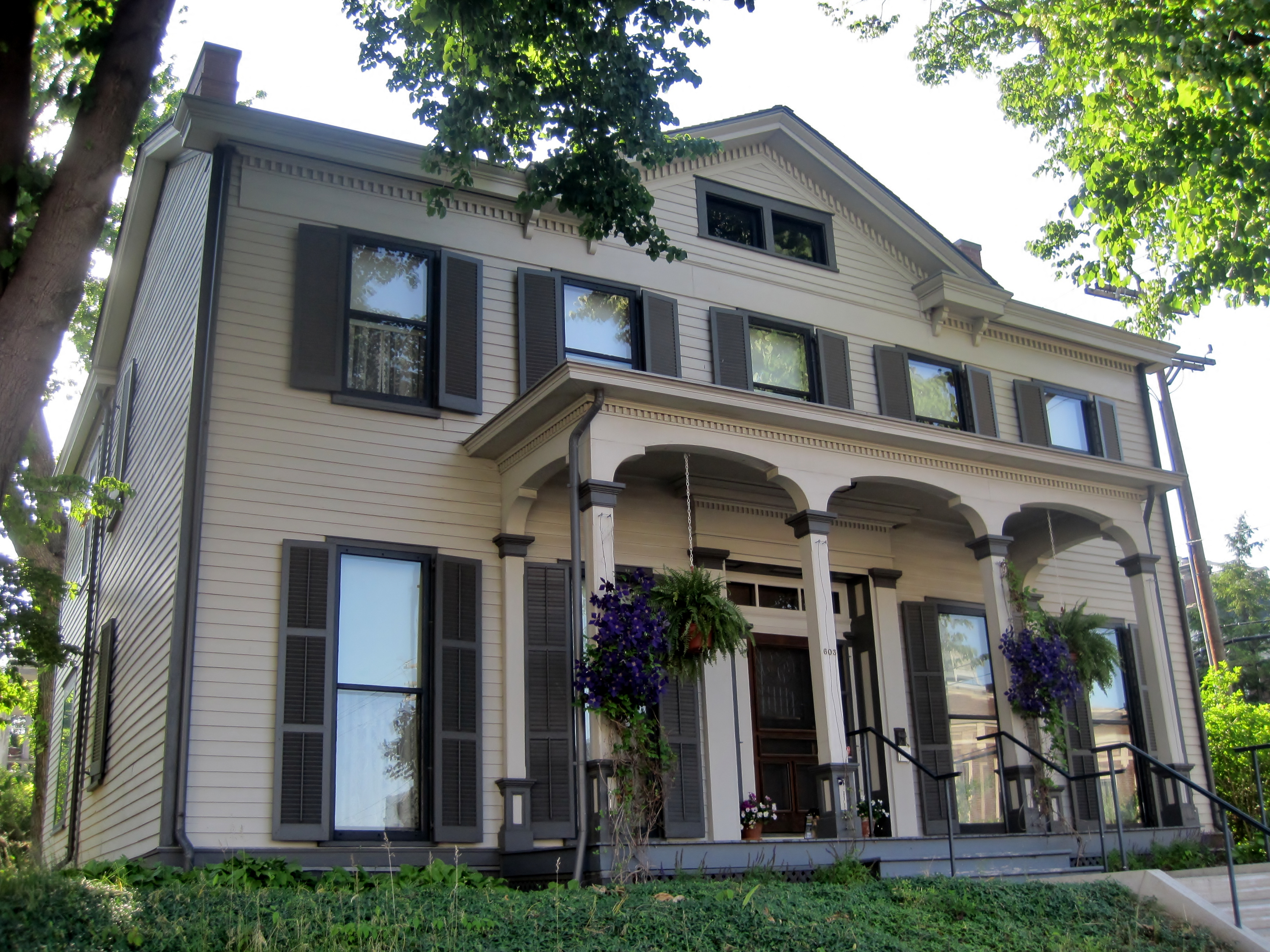
House in 2012

== See also ==
- List of National Historic Landmarks in Illinois
- National Register of Historic Places listings in Sangamon County, Illinois
