= Alvin S. Keys House =

Historic house in Illinois, United States

- U.S. National Register of Historic Places
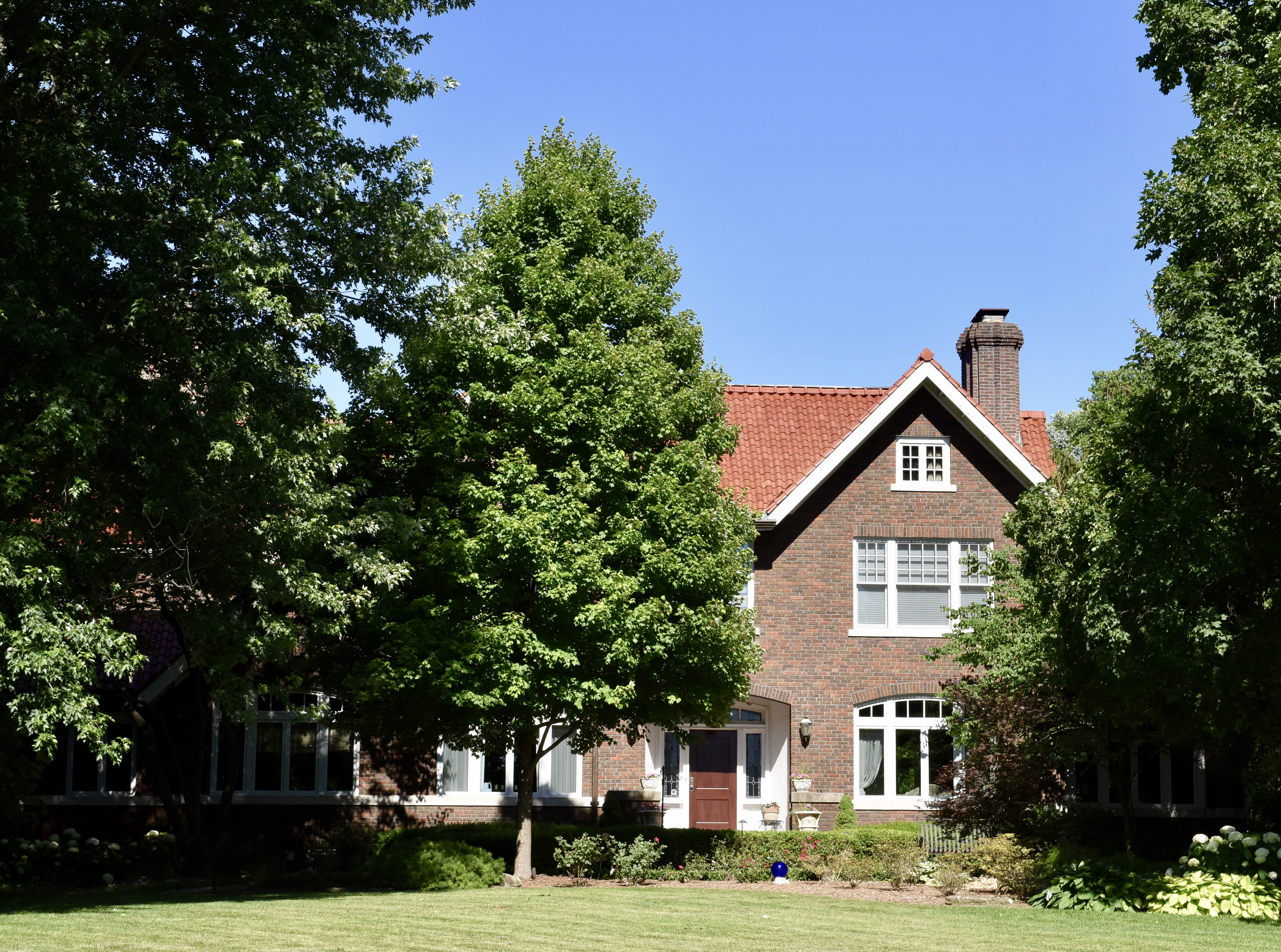

- Location within Illinois Location within the United States
- Location: 1600 Illini Rd., Leland Grove, Illinois
- Coordinates: 39.781944°N 89.684167°W
- Area: 3 acres (1.2 ha)
- Built: 1929-1930
- Architect: Hanes, Murray S.
- Architectural style: Colonial Revival
- NRHP reference No.: 94000432
- Added to NRHP: May 6, 1994

The Alvin S. Keys House is a historic house located at 1600 Illini Road in Leland Grove, Illinois. The house was built in 1929-30 for Republican politician and community leader Alvin S. Keys. At the time, Leland Grove was one of the most exclusive of Springfield's developing suburbs; the Keys House had an especially desirable location, as it was across the street from the Illini Country Club. Architect Murray S. Hanes designed the house in the Colonial Revival style, one of the most popular styles in America at the time. The front facade features a projecting entrance with a decorative fanlight and side lights; the rest of the facade is fairly plain, so as not to detract from the entrance. The interior incorporates Colonial woodwork and features into a modern floor plan, which included a powder room for guests, a recreation room, a screened porch, and an attached garage.

The house was added to the National Register of Historic Places on May 6, 1994.
