= Joseph Miller House =

Historic house in Illinois, United States

- U.S. National Register of Historic Places
- Location within Illinois Location within the United States
- Nearest city: Rochester, Illinois
- Coordinates: 39°45′26″N 89°28′28″W
- Area: 0 acres (0 ha)
- Built: 1867
- Architectural style: Federal
- NRHP reference No.: 80001408
- Added to NRHP: November 24, 1980

The Joseph Miller House is a historic house located on Buckhart Road in Rochester, Illinois. The Federal style house was built by Joseph Miller in 1867; it is one of the oldest surviving homes in Rochester.

== Architecture ==
The Miller House is a square brick house built in 1867. It sits on a low bluff overlooking the Sangamon River floodplain. The bricks were handmade locally, and the limestone was sourced from Cold Springs about five miles from the site. It is an example of a Federal style farmhouse.

A wide verandah along the side and a kitchen addition in the back reflect Miller's Virginia ancestry.

Outbuildings include a root cellar and wooden pegged barn. The summer kitchen and smokehouse no longer exist.

== History ==
The Miller family moved from Virginia to the Rochester area in 1835, when Christian Miller bought enough land to become one of the largest landowners in Sangamon County. Joseph, Christian's son, inherited the land in 1842; his descendants remained a prominent landholding family in the area. Joseph was the eighth of ten children.

The house was added to the National Register of Historic Places on November 24, 1980.
