= Hugh M. Garvey House =

Historic house in Illinois, United States

- U.S. National Register of Historic Places
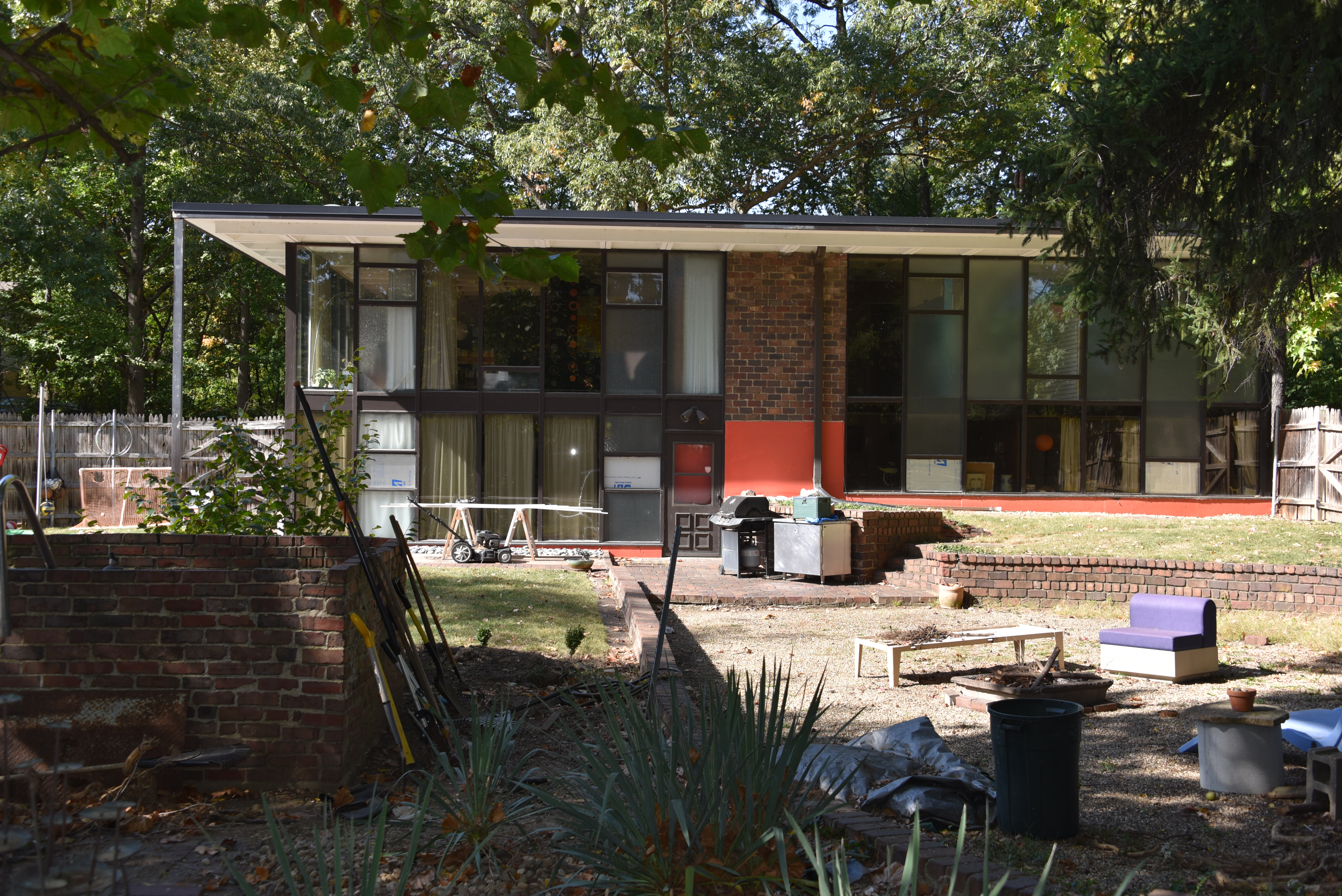

- Location within Illinois Location within the United States
- Location: 8 Fair Oaks Dr., Leland Grove, Illinois
- Coordinates: 39°46′54″N 89°41′13″W
- Area: less than one acre
- Built: 1956-1959
- Architect: Benya, John
- Architectural style: International Style
- NRHP reference No.: 09000898
- Added to NRHP: November 10, 2009

The Hugh M. Garvey House, also known as the Garvey-Ferry House, is a historic house located at 8 Fair Oaks Drive in Leland Grove, Illinois.

== Architecture ==
The International Style and Miesan style house was built from 1956 to 1959. Prominent Quincy-based architect John Benya designed the house in 1956. It was completed in 1959. Benya designed hundreds of houses and commercial buildings throughout his life. He later became known for his major projects in Quincy, including its airport terminal.

The two-story house has a glass-paneled curtain wall exterior with an aluminum frame. Steel and concrete elements provide structural support, and concrete and brick dividers split each side of the house in half visually. Benya's use of large, textured bricks in the International Style was uncommon.

Charles Aguar designed the original landscape plan, which included honeysuckle ground cover and a circular path. Due to the widening of Chatham Road in the 1970s, a large section of the landscape had to be removed. The house is surrounded by deciduous woodland on an approximately one acre lot.

== History ==
The Hugh M. Garvey House was the first house built in the International style in the Springfield area and one of the area's first modern-styled homes. It led to a wave of popularity for the style in Springfield during the 1960s.

The house was built for clients Hugh and Jane Garvey and their eight children. Garvey was the owner of Springfield's Templegate Press, which published general literature and religious literature. The Garvey family lived in the house for over 40 years.

Springfield architect Bruce Ferry and his wife Lorraine bought the house after Hugh Garvey's death in 2003.

The house was added to the National Register of Historic Places on November 10, 2009.
