= Brunk Farmstead =

- U.S. National Register of Historic Places
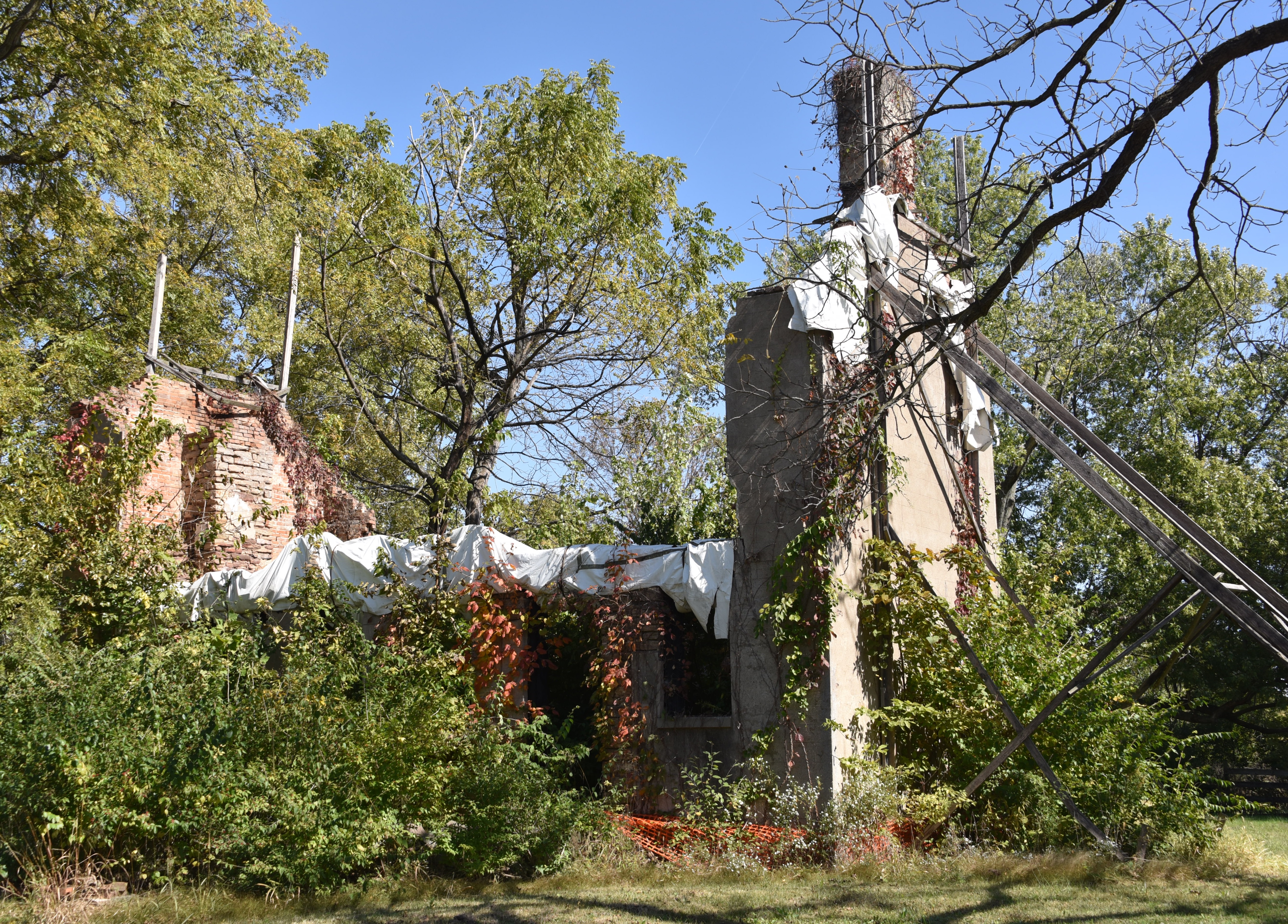
- Ruins of Brunk Farmstead, October 2015

- Location within Illinois Location within the United States
- Nearest city: Rochester, Illinois
- Coordinates: 39°41′51″N 89°35′12″W
- Area: 5 acres (2.0 ha)
- Architectural style: Federal, Greek Revival, Italianate
- NRHP reference No.: 99001569
- Added to NRHP: December 17, 1999

The Brunk Farmstead is a historic farm located on KOA Campground Road 1 mile (1.6 km) south of East Lake Drive near Rochester, Illinois. George Brunk, an early settler of Sangamon County, established the farm in the 1820s; the farm is one of the few surviving properties from the county's early settlement. The farmhouse was built as a one-story stone structure circa 1829; its second story was added in the 1850s, giving it an I-house plan. While the house originally had a mainly Federal design, it was later updated with Greek Revival and Italianate influences. The original horse barn, the other historically significant building on the property, is a three-bay English barn built in the late 1820s.

The farm was added to the National Register of Historic Places on December 17, 1999.
