= Lincoln Colored Home =

- U.S. National Register of Historic Places
- Illinois State Historic Site
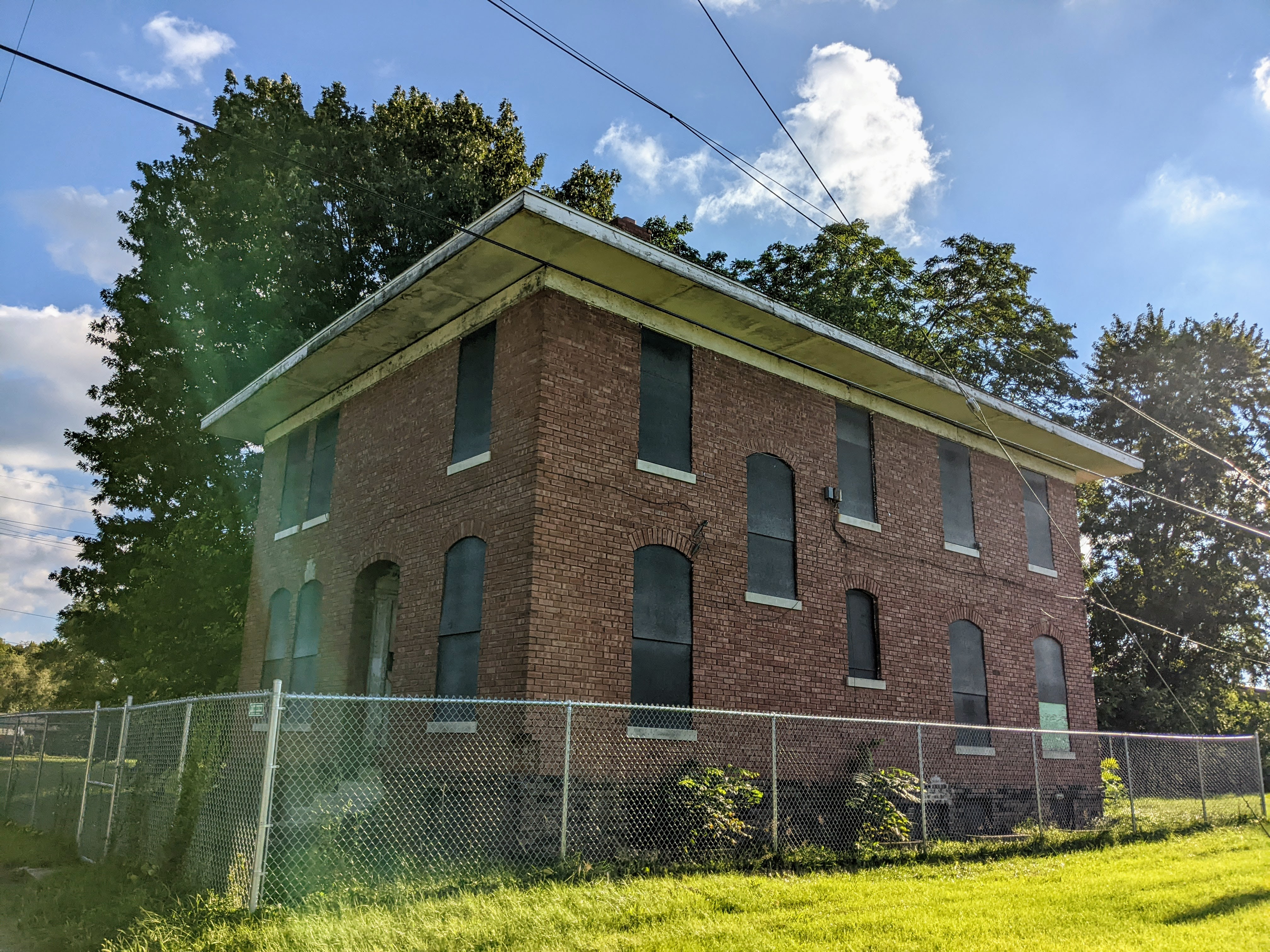

- Location within Illinois Location within the United States
- Location: Springfield, Illinois
- Coordinates: 39°47′51.29″N 89°38′23.0″W
- Built: 1904
- NRHP reference No.: 98000985
- Added to NRHP: August 6, 1998

The Lincoln Colored Home, also known as the Lincoln Colored Old Folks and Orphans Home, was opened March 8, 1898 and remained in operation in Springfield, Illinois until 1933. It was one of the first orphanages for African American children in the United States. The actual building is still standing and was added to the National Register of Historic Places in 1998.

The home, located at 427 South 12th Street in Springfield, IL, was built in 1904 after the original home at the same site was razed. Currently, the home stands empty in a state of disrepair, although the last two owners of the property have made efforts to restore it.

== History ==
The Lincoln Colored Old Folks and Orphans Home was founded by Eva Carroll Monroe in 1898. Monroe had moved to Springfield from Kewanee, Illinois two years earlier and managed to save $125 in that time and place a down payment on the property. Despite her fellow townspeople thinking her foolish to do so, Monroe wished to open a home to care for black orphans. Three other orphanages were in operation in Springfield at that time but none of them would take in children of color.

Monroe's efforts were brought to the attention of Mary Lawrence. Lawrence was the widow of Rheuna Lawrence, a past mayor of Springfield. If not for Lawrence's involvement, the home would have been closed when Monroe had fallen behind on the property mortgage and was in danger of foreclosure. Lawrence not only paid $1400 to bring Monroe current on her debts but also brought considerable political attentions to the home through her community connections.

Lawrence persuaded Monroe to raze the existing structure, which the locals had referred to as the "Haunted House" when Monroe first purchased it, and build a new structure. The new house included doors, windows, stained glass and chandeliers from Lawrence's own home after she and her daughter Susan Lawrence Dana commissioned architect Frank Lloyd Wright to remodel their Victorian mansion on East Lawrence Avenue in Springfield, which some say was the highest commissioned job he had taken on at that point in his career.

On March 11, 1906 the new Lincoln Colored Old Folks and Orphans Home was dedicated to the memory of Mary Lawrence on the anniversary of her sudden death a year earlier. At that time Monroe was caring for 29 children and eight elderly women. A big part of the home's continued success was due to Susan Lawrence Dana, who continued her mother's support of the home both financially and politically.

The home's demise began when philosophical and social changes began occurring in the mid-1920s. Across the United States people began to feel that foster-parenting was a more acceptable way of raising children who were without parents. Many people also felt that a college education was mandatory for someone who ran a facility such as the Lincoln Colored Home. These two shifts in the country's mind-set led to the home losing its licensing to care for the elderly. In 1933 the State of Illinois would not grant a new license to the home to care for orphans. The 32 children in the home at that time were dispersed either back to their own homes or to boarding homes, ending Monroe's dream.

== Current status ==
The home and the property it sits on were sold at auction in 1944 and the proceeds went to pay for Dana's medical bills. Ownership of the property has changed hands a few times since then and is now owned by the estate of Lyman Hubbard Sr, a former Tuskegee Airman who died in 2012. Members of Hubbard's family hope to see their father's dream of restoring and preserving the site come to reality.
