= Taft Farmstead =

- U.S. National Register of Historic Places
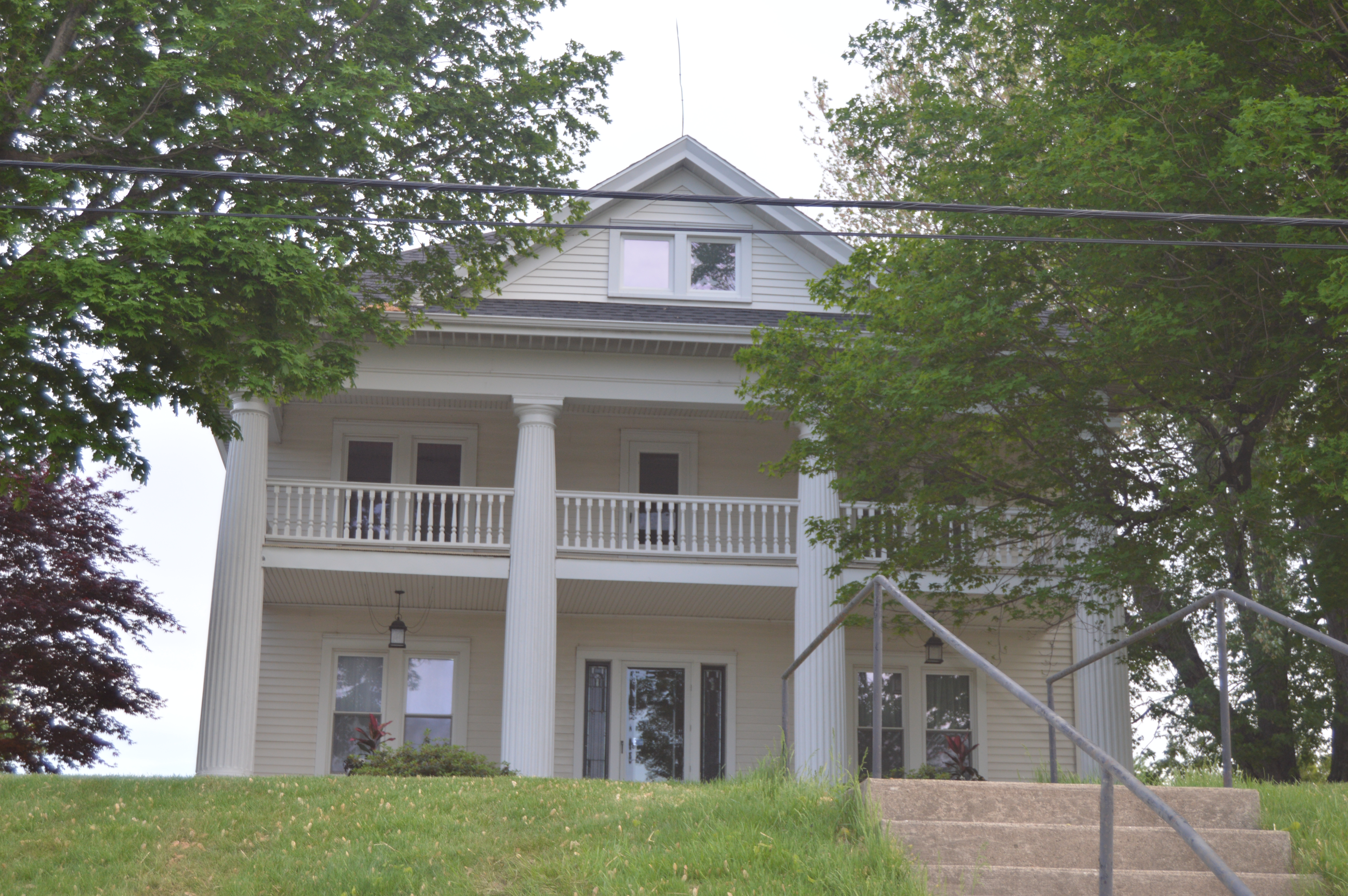
- The Taft farmhouse

- Location within Illinois Location within the United States
- Location: SR 3, Rochester, Illinois
- Coordinates: 39°45′8″N 89°33′34″W
- Area: 2 acres (0.81 ha)
- Built: 1906, 1912
- Built by: Dickerson, Bill
- Architectural style: Classical Revival
- NRHP reference No.: 80001409
- Added to NRHP: November 20, 1980

The Taft Farmstead is a historic farm located west of Rochester, Sangamon County, Illinois. Established in the early 20th century, the farm is one of the few intact farmsteads from the period which was not a renovation of an earlier farm. The farm's Classical Revival farmhouse, which dates from 1912, is representative of the spread of individualized architecture to farms; its design includes two-story Doric columns along the front porch and a pyramidal roof with a pediment-like dormer in front. The farm's main barn, a wooden structure used for livestock, was built in 1906. The farm also includes two additional barns, a grain shed, a chicken coop, an outhouse, and a garage.

The farm was added to the National Register of Historic Places on November 20, 1980.
