= Joseph Ross House =

Historic house in Illinois, United States

- U.S. National Register of Historic Places
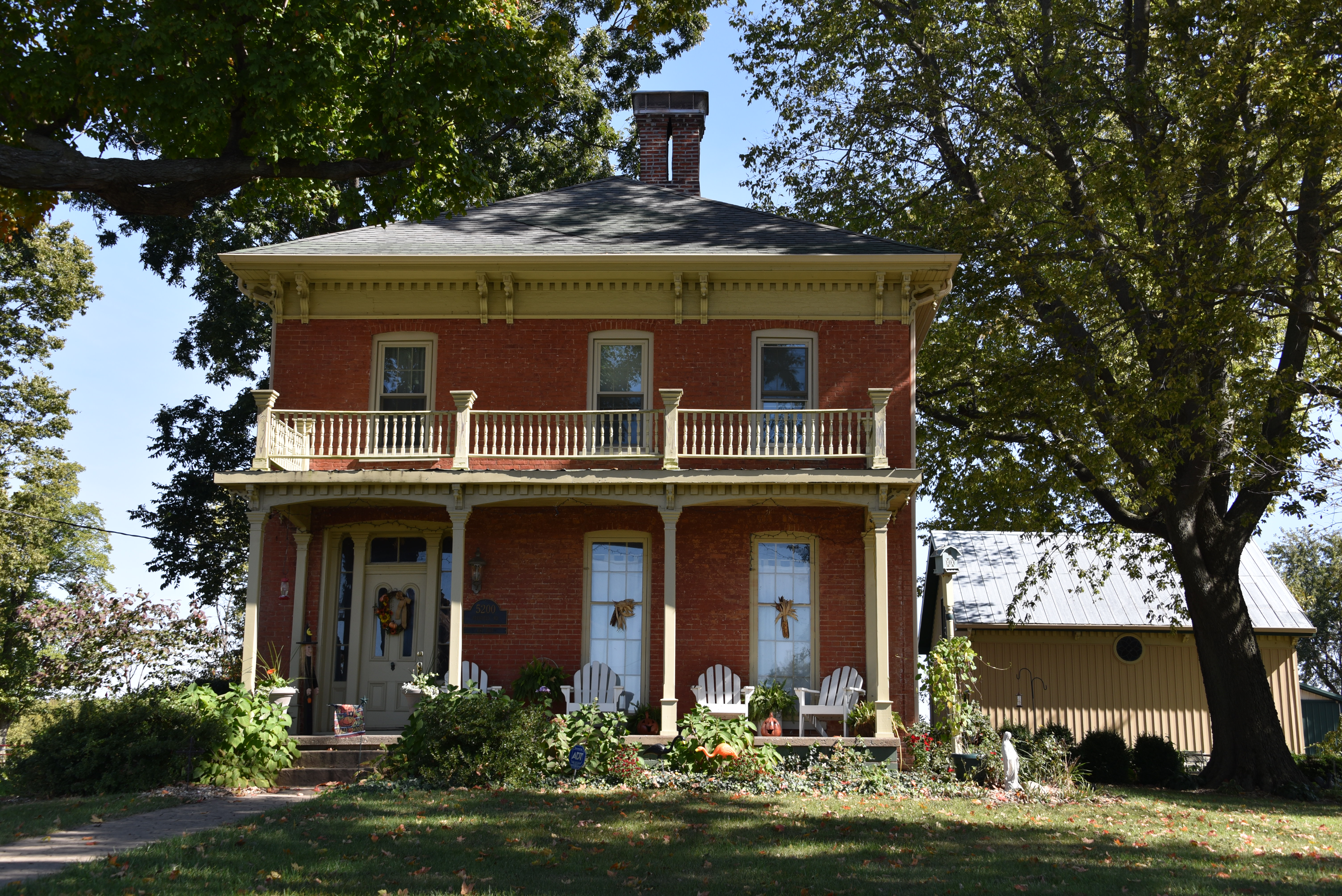

- Location within Illinois Location within the United States
- Nearest city: Rochester, Illinois
- Coordinates: 39°43′41″N 89°26′4″W
- Area: 3 acres (1.2 ha)
- Built: 1868
- Architectural style: Italianate
- NRHP reference No.: 06000092
- Added to NRHP: March 2, 2006

The Joseph Ross House is a historic house located at 5200 Passfield Road in Rochester, Illinois. Joseph Ross built the two-story Italianate house in 1868. The brick house has an L-shaped plan with a low hip roof. Two porches run along the house, one at the front entrance and one along the rear ell. A bracketed and dentillated cornice, the house's main decorative feature and a key element of the Italianate style, encircles the roof line. The house is the best-preserved brick Italianate house in the Rochester vicinity.

The house was added to the National Register of Historic Places on March 2, 2006.
