= Power Farmstead =

- U.S. National Register of Historic Places
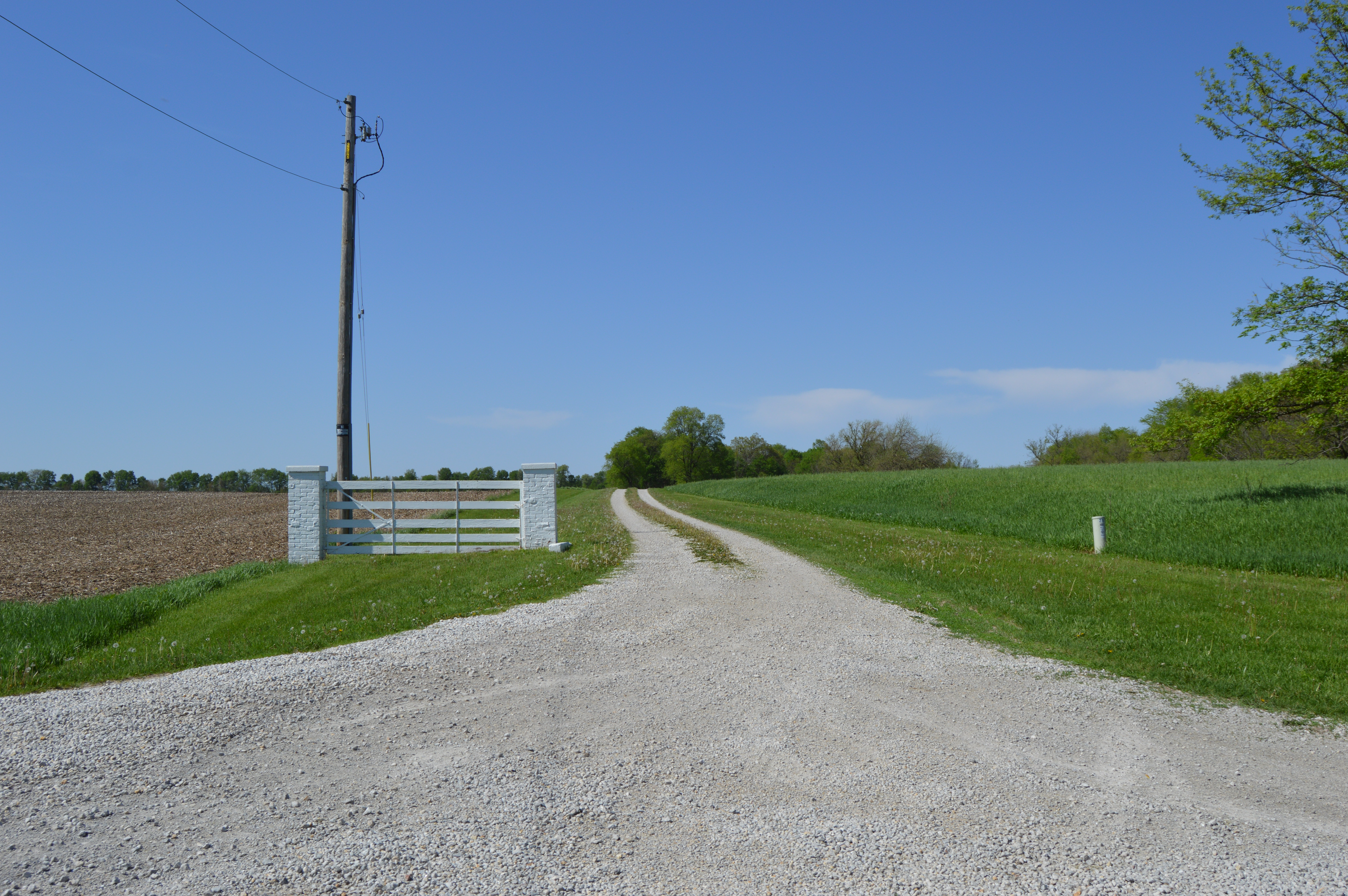
- Driveway to the farm

- Location within Illinois Location within the United States
- Nearest city: Cantrall, Illinois
- Coordinates: 39°56′39″N 89°39′45″W
- Area: 98 acres (40 ha)
- Built: 1829
- Built by: Crawford, William
- Architectural style: Queen Anne, Federal
- NRHP reference No.: 89000341
- Added to NRHP: May 1, 1989

The Power Farmstead is a historic farm located on County Road 9500N east of Cantrall, Illinois. George Power, a prominent early settler of northern Sangamon County, established the farm in the 1820s. The farm includes an intact collection of buildings which represent typical 19th-century farm life. In addition, the original farmhouse served as a local courthouse, as Power was Sangamon County's justice of the peace for two decades; Abraham Lincoln argued his first case in the courthouse. The farm was added to the National Register of Historic Places on May 1, 1989.

== Description ==
The farm includes thirteen buildings, eleven of which are contributing buildings, and five other contributing resources. Power's original farmhouse, which also served as a local courthouse, is the farm's oldest building; built in 1829, it was the first frame building in the county north of the Sangamon River. A new main farmhouse with a detached kitchen was built circa 1840-1850; this farmhouse is still the farm's main building. The 1845 wooden stable is the oldest non-residence building on the farm. Three other large 19th-century buildings remain on the farm: the main barn, caretaker's cottage, and scales house. Significant outbuildings include the wood house, smoke house, ice house, gas generator house, privy, pergola, and corn crib. A family cemetery is located to the southeast of the main farmhouse.

== History ==
George Power, originally a Kentucky resident, moved to Sangamon County in 1821; he settled on his farm's land the same year, building a temporary log cabin to live in. Power was one of the first settlers in the county, which allowed him to buy enough farmland to establish one of its largest farms. He also played an important role in its justice system, as he served as Sangamon County's justice of the peace from 1828 to 1847. When the farm's original farmhouse was completed in 1829, it also became Power's courthouse. As circuit courts only met biannually at the time, Power heard hundreds of the county's important cases in his farmhouse, including the first case argued by Abraham Lincoln. After Power's death in 1886, his son James inherited the farm; the property remains in the Power family.
