= Illinois Department of Mines and Minerals-Springfield Mine Rescue Station =

- U.S. National Register of Historic Places
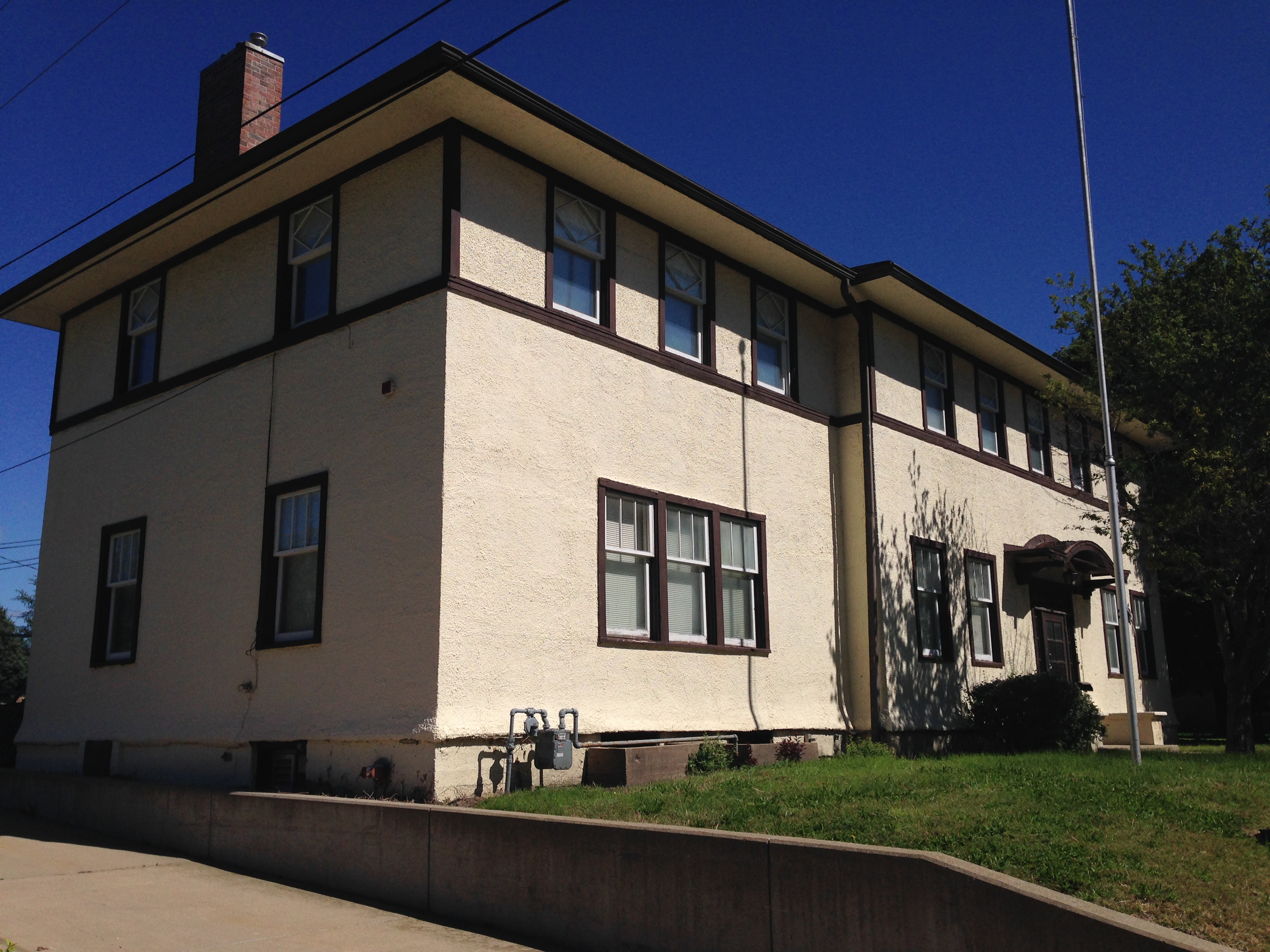

- Location within Illinois Location within the United States
- Location: 609 Princeton Ave., Springfield, Illinois
- Coordinates: 39°46′29″N 89°38′53″W
- Area: less than one acre
- Built: 1910–11
- Built by: Scott-Morledge Lumber Company
- NRHP reference No.: 85001481
- Added to NRHP: July 5, 1985

The Illinois Department of Mines and Minerals' Springfield Mine Rescue Station is a historic facility located at 609 Princeton Avenue in Springfield, Illinois. Built in 1910–11, it was the first dedicated state-run institution in the United States established to prevent and respond to mining disasters. The station provided critical training in safety procedures and emergency preparedness for both miners and dedicated rescue workers. It was added to the National Register of Historic Places on July 5, 1985.

== History ==
At the turn of the 20th century, Illinois was a major coal producer, and the rapid expansion of its mining industry brought significant safety risks. The 1909 Cherry Mine disaster, which claimed 259 lives, underscored the urgent need for enhanced mining safety measures. In response, the Illinois government passed legislation authorizing the creation of three mine rescue stations across the state. The Springfield station served Central Illinois, while stations in LaSalle and Benton covered the northern and southern regions. Construction of the stations began in 1910, with the Springfield station completed in January 1911—making it the first dedicated mine rescue station in the country. In 1914, Illinois bolstered its safety efforts by opening additional stations in Herrin, Harrisburg, and Du Quoin.

The station served two primary functions: training miners in proper safety protocols and preparing specialized rescue teams for potential mining emergencies. Its facilities included classrooms and a dedicated room for simulating smoke-filled mine conditions, as well as living quarters for rescue personnel. In 1948, a garage was added to house the state’s first mobile rescue unit, significantly improving response times for emergencies. Today, the station remains operational and continues to train miners and rescue workers. It is the northernmost of the four active mine rescue stations in Illinois.
