= John F. Bretz House and Warehouse =

Historic house in Illinois, United States

- U.S. National Register of Historic Places
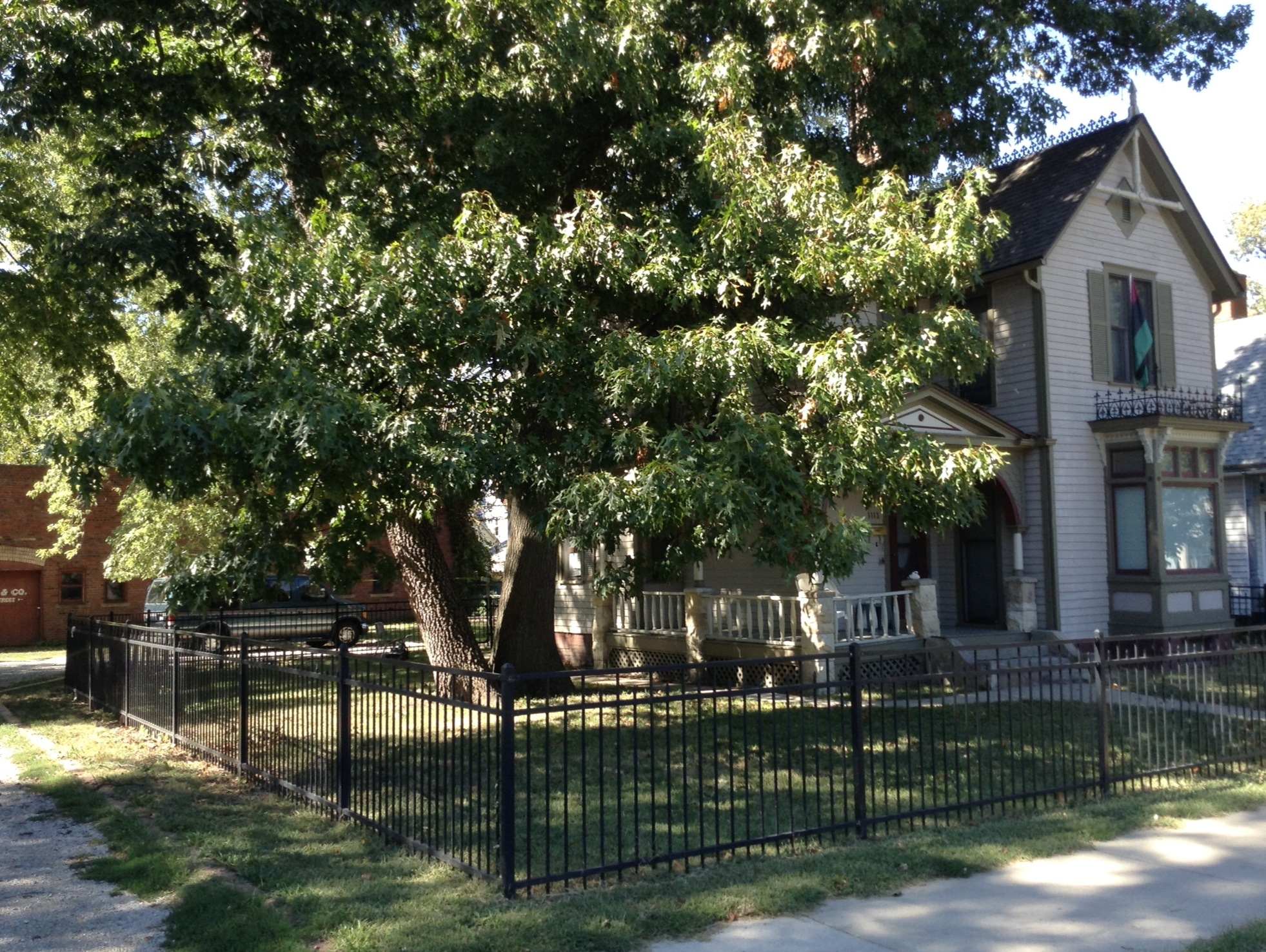

- Location within Illinois Location within the United States
- Location: 1113 N. Fifth St., Springfield, Illinois
- Coordinates: 39°48′50″N 89°38′58″W
- Area: less than one acre
- Built: 1886
- Architectural style: Queen Anne
- NRHP reference No.: 00000945
- Added to NRHP: August 10, 2000

The John F. Bretz House and Warehouse are a pair of historic buildings located at 1113 North Fifth Street in Springfield, Illinois, United States. The house was built circa 1886 for contractor John F. Bretz. Bretz was Springfield's supervisor of city streets for several periods in the 1870s and 1880s, and he also completed several city projects as a private contractor. He played an important role in the construction of Springfield's sewer system, and he began paving the city's streets in brick rather than wood. His house has a Queen Anne design featuring a wraparound front porch with a balustrade, decorative shingle siding, and metal crests along the roof. The two-story brick warehouse, located behind the house, was used by Bretz for his contracting work.

The house and warehouse were added to the National Register of Historic Places on August 10, 2000.
