= Hickox Apartments =

- U.S. National Register of Historic Places
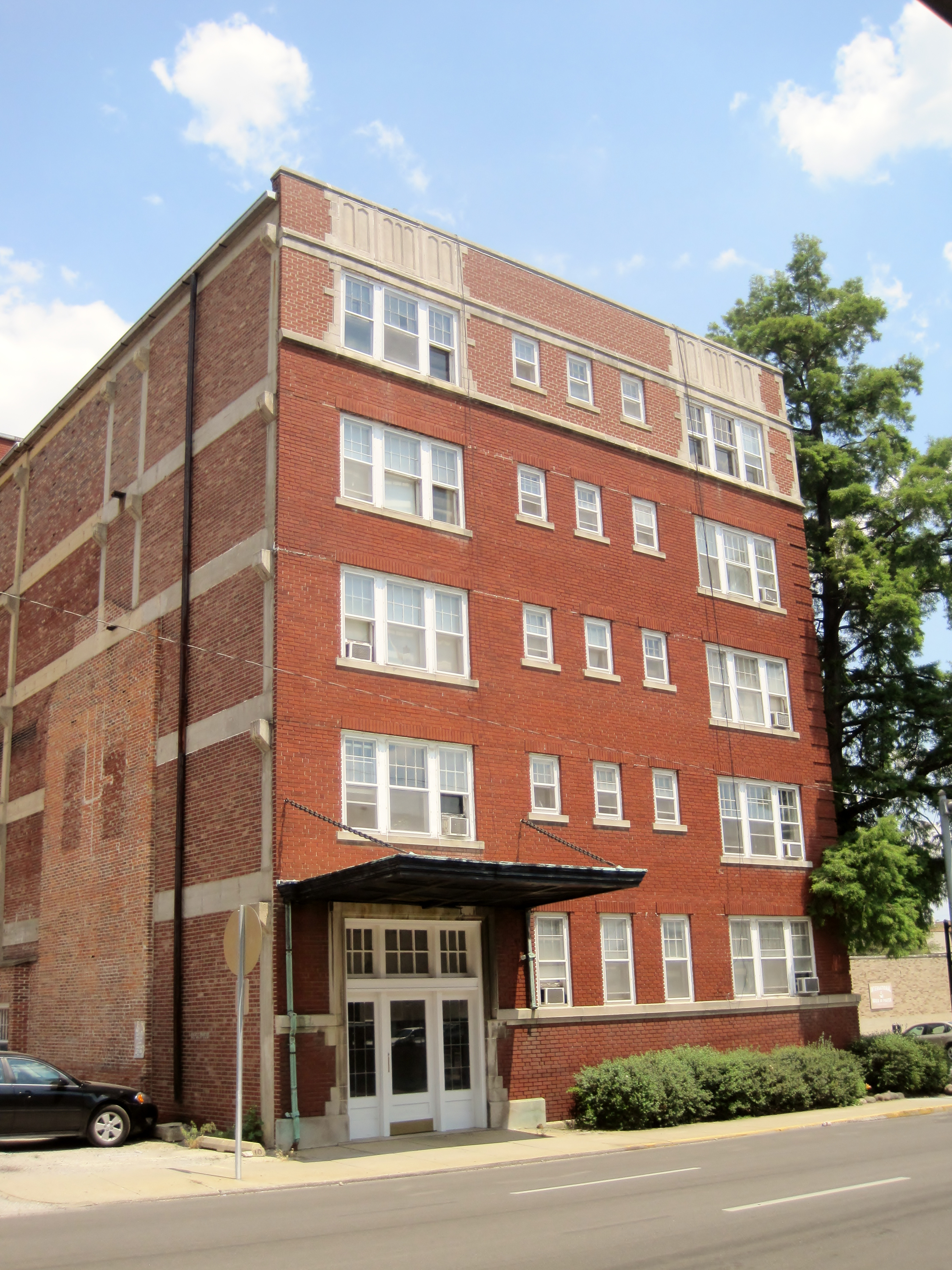

- Location within Illinois Location within the United States
- Location: 4th and Cook Sts., Springfield, Illinois
- Coordinates: 39°47′43″N 89°39′4″W
- Area: less than one acre
- Built: 1920-1929
- Architect: Carl Meyer
- Developer: Harris Hickox
- Architectural style: Colonial Revival, Classical Revival, Georgian Revival
- NRHP reference No.: 84000337
- Added to NRHP: November 13, 1984

The Hickox Apartments is an historic apartment complex located at the corner of 4th and Cook Streets in Springfield, Illinois. The complex consists of five building units built from 1920 to 1929. The buildings represent three of the five major types of Springfield apartments: two- and three-flat row apartments, detached low-rise apartments with a courtyard, and larger suburban-style apartments with a courtyard. The complex, located near the Illinois Executive Mansion in the Aristocracy Hill neighborhood, was the first apartment complex targeted at upper-middle-class families. While Springfield's apartments had typically been seen as lower-class residences, developer Harris Hickox used lavish amenities, a desirable location, and his own social status to draw wealthier residents to his new complex. Hickox also created an air of exclusivity for his apartments by employing domestic staff and lobby guards and defying the local convention of advertising new apartments. The apartments remained a respected and desirable complex through the 1960s, outlasting most of the other luxury apartments which followed its lead.

The complex was added to the National Register of Historic Places on November 13, 1984.

== See also ==
- National Register of Historic Places listings in Sangamon County, Illinois
