= Dr. Charles Compton House =

Historic house in Illinois, United States

- U.S. National Register of Historic Places
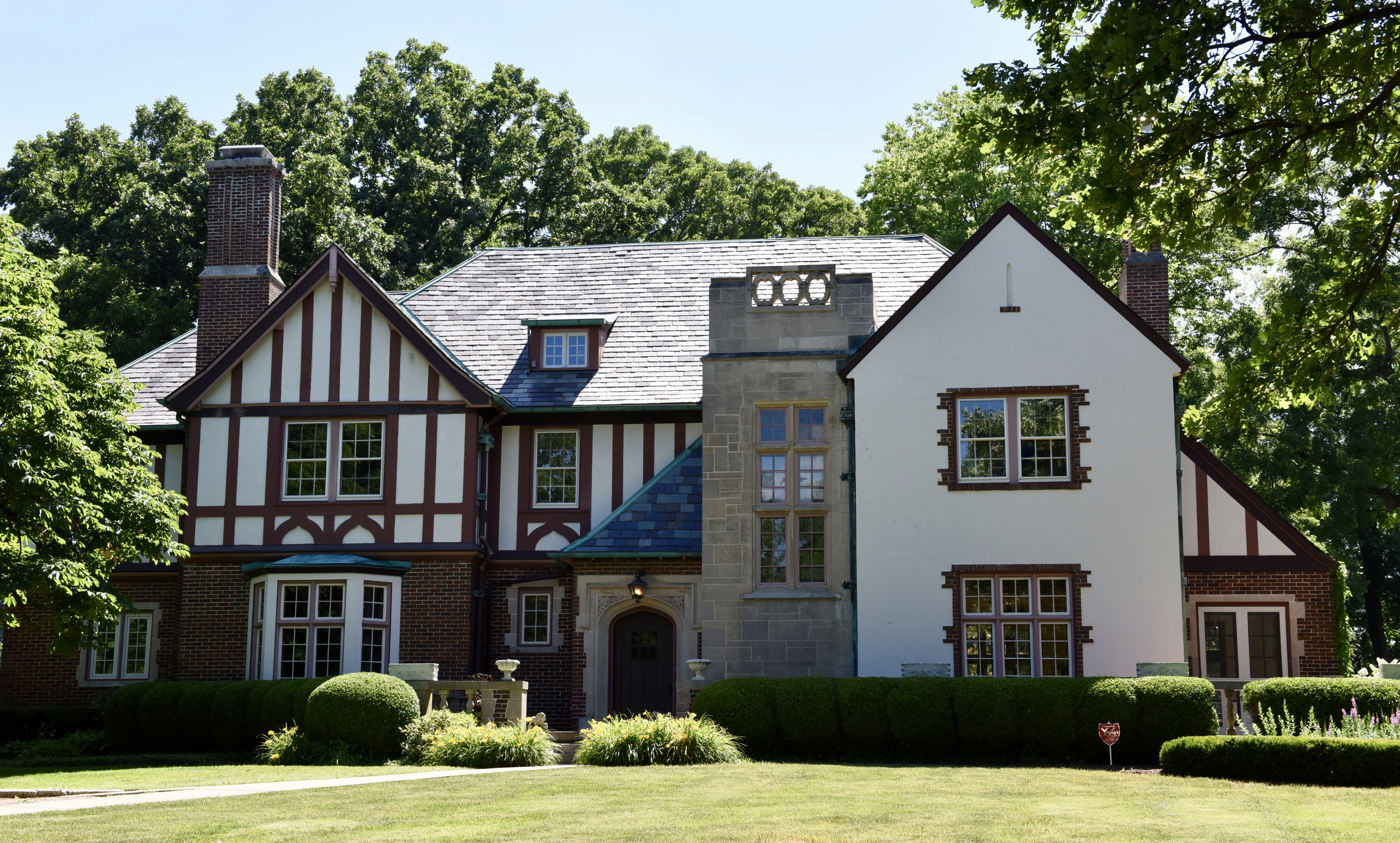

- Location within Illinois Location within the United States
- Location: 1303 S. Wiggins, Springfield, Illinois
- Coordinates: 39°47′11″N 89°40′46″W
- Built: 1926
- Architect: Helmle & Helmle
- Architectural style: Tudor Revival
- NRHP reference No.: 100000964
- Added to NRHP: May 8, 2017

The Dr. Charles Compton House is a historic house at 1303 South Wiggins Avenue in the Oak Knolls neighborhood of Springfield, Illinois. It was built in 1926 for Dr. Charles Wentworth Compton, a local surgeon and the founder of local political group the Wentworth Republicans.

Springfield architects Helmle and Helmle designed the Tudor Revival house, one of their many works in Oak Knolls. The front facade features a variety of materials and textures. The main entrance has its own roof and neighbors a stone tower with a parapet. The front of the house has a projecting gable on either side of the door; one gable is stucco with brick-edged windows, and the other matches the rest of the front facade, with brick on the first floor and stucco half-timbering on the second. The original slate roof has two brick chimneys.

The house was added to the National Register of Historic Places on May 8, 2017.
