= Town House (Springfield, Illinois) =

- The Town House
- U.S. National Register of Historic Places
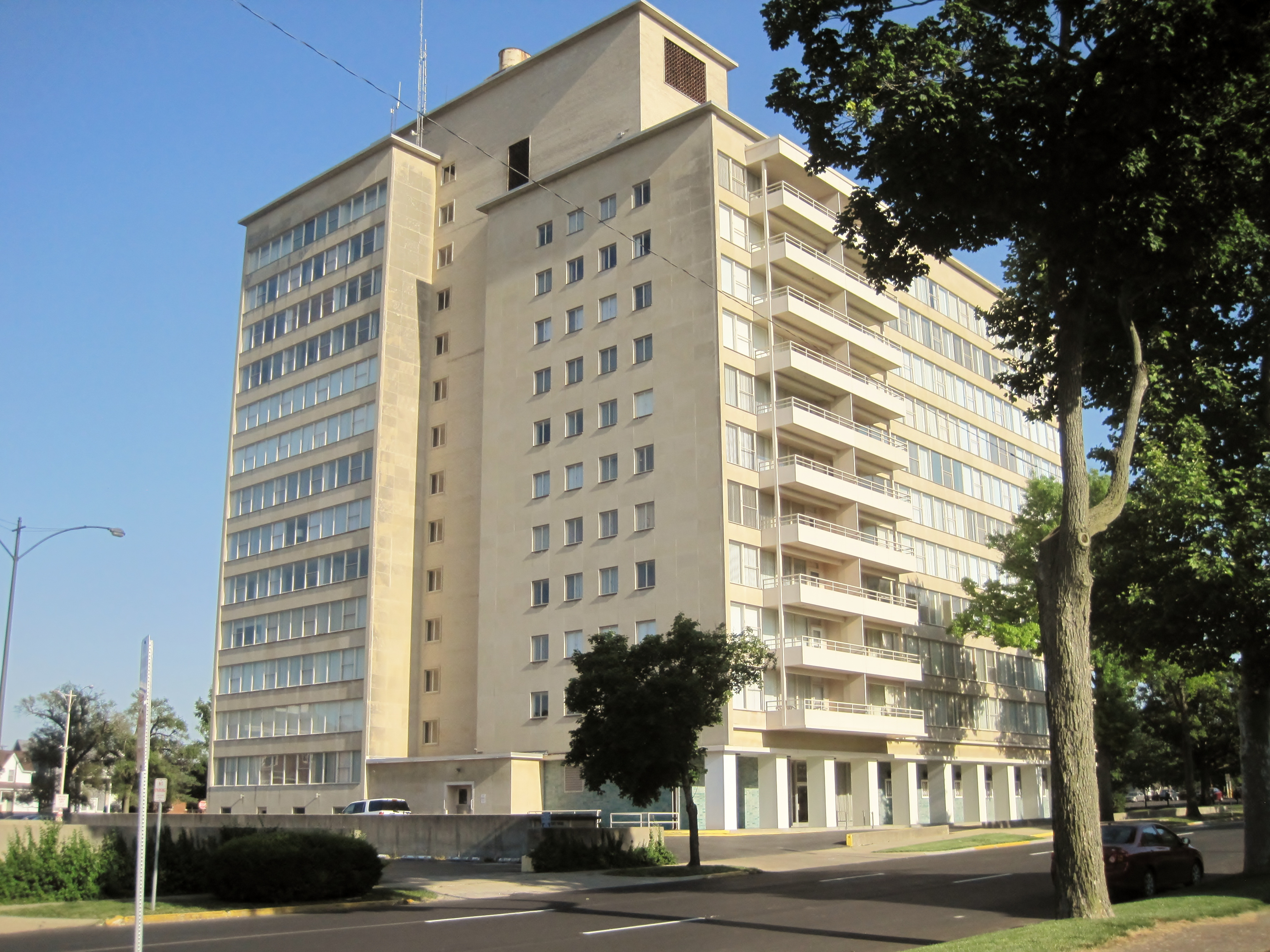

- Location within Illinois Location within the United States
- Location: 718 S. 7th St., Springfield, Illinois
- Coordinates: 39°47′39″N 89°38′47″W
- Area: 1.6 acres (0.65 ha)
- Built: 1958
- Built by: Evans Construction
- Architect: Shaw, Metz and Dolio
- Architectural style: International Style
- MPS: Multiple Family Dwellings in Springfield, Illinois MPS
- NRHP reference No.: 05000603
- Added to NRHP: June 3, 2005

The Town House is a historic apartment building located at 718 S. 7th Street in Springfield, Illinois. The high-rise building is composed of an 11-story section and a 13-story section joined by a 14-story connector. Built in 1958, the International Style building was designed by Chicago architectural firm Shaw, Metz and Dolio. Springfield's Franklin Life Insurance Company underwrote the building; while it was originally intended to serve as employee housing, it quickly became a desirable residence for the general public as well. The building was the first high-rise luxury apartment complex in Springfield and was likely inspired by the earlier Hickox Apartments, a 1920s complex which set standards for luxury apartments in Springfield. It attempted to bring the more urban lifestyle of large Midwestern cities to comparatively smaller Springfield, and early residents boasted of their access to downtown and reduced housework. Shortly after its construction, however, the national trend of dispersed suburban homes made its way to Springfield; as a result, the Town House was the only luxury high-rise apartment ever built in the city.

The building was added to the National Register of Historic Places on June 3, 2005.
