= Taylor Apartments =

- U.S. National Register of Historic Places
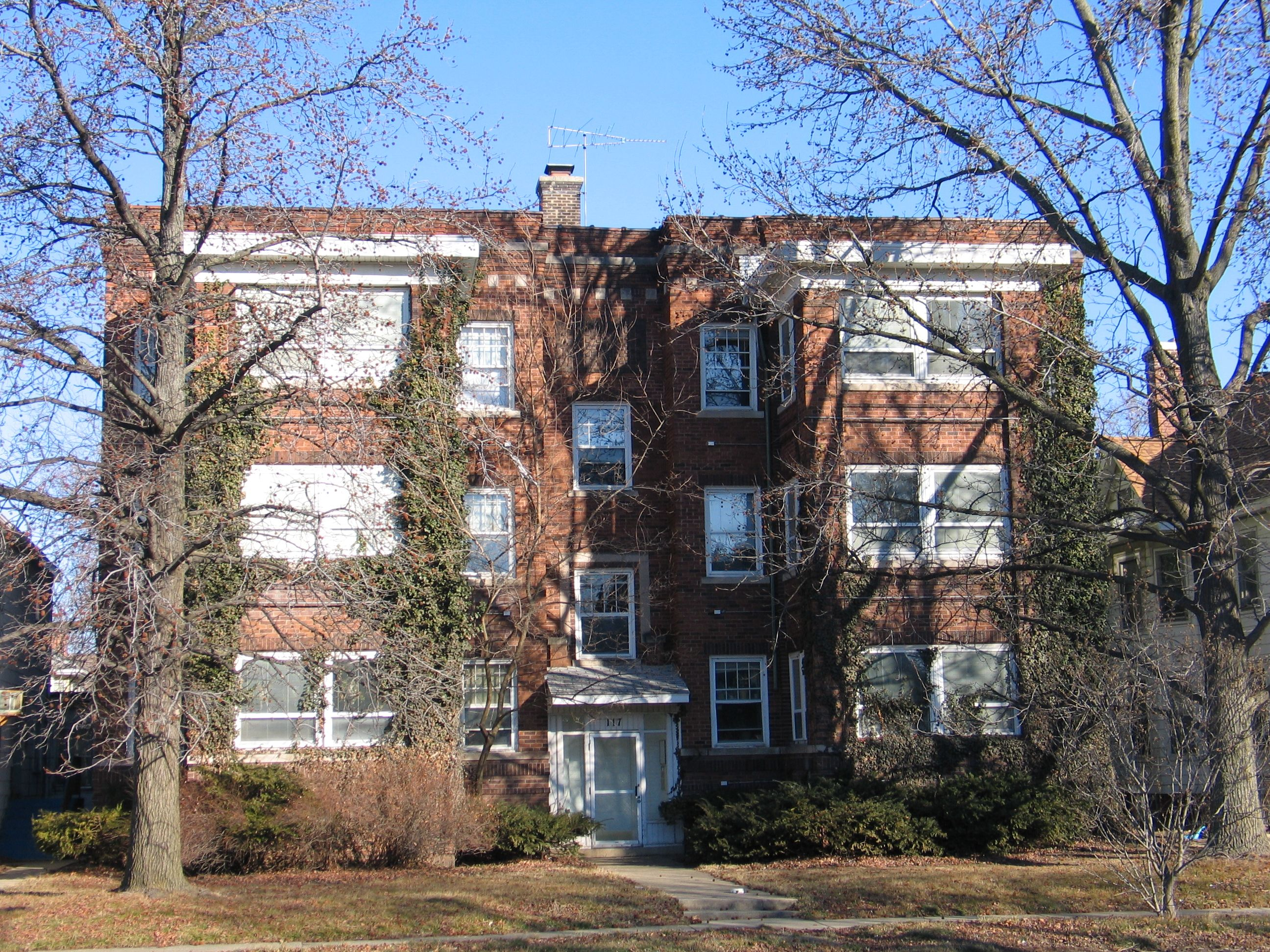

- Location within Illinois Location within the United States
- Location: 117 S. Grand Ave. W, Springfield, Illinois
- Coordinates: 39°47′14″N 89°39′20″W
- Area: less than one acre
- Built: 1916
- Architectural style: Six-flat
- MPS: Multiple Family Dwellings in Springfield, Illinois MPS
- NRHP reference No.: 04000976
- Added to NRHP: September 15, 2004

The Taylor Apartments is a historic apartment building located at 117 South Grand Avenue West in Springfield, Illinois. The six-flat building was built by Dr. Percy L. Taylor in 1916. Taylor, the former City Physician of Springfield, rented the apartments as a source of retirement income. Springfield experienced a population boom in the 1900s and 1910s, and most of its new residents were young professionals who only lived there for a short time. As a result, many new apartments were built during this period, particularly in Springfield's Aristocracy Hill neighborhood, where the Taylor Apartments were located. The rise in apartments for professionals led to the increased social acceptability of Springfield's apartments, which had previously been seen as lower-status housing. The six-flat apartment was one of the more common building types during the boom, and the Taylor Apartments are a representative example of the style.

The apartments were added to the National Register of Historic Places on September 15, 2004.
