= Fred Gottschalk Grocery Store =

- U.S. National Register of Historic Places
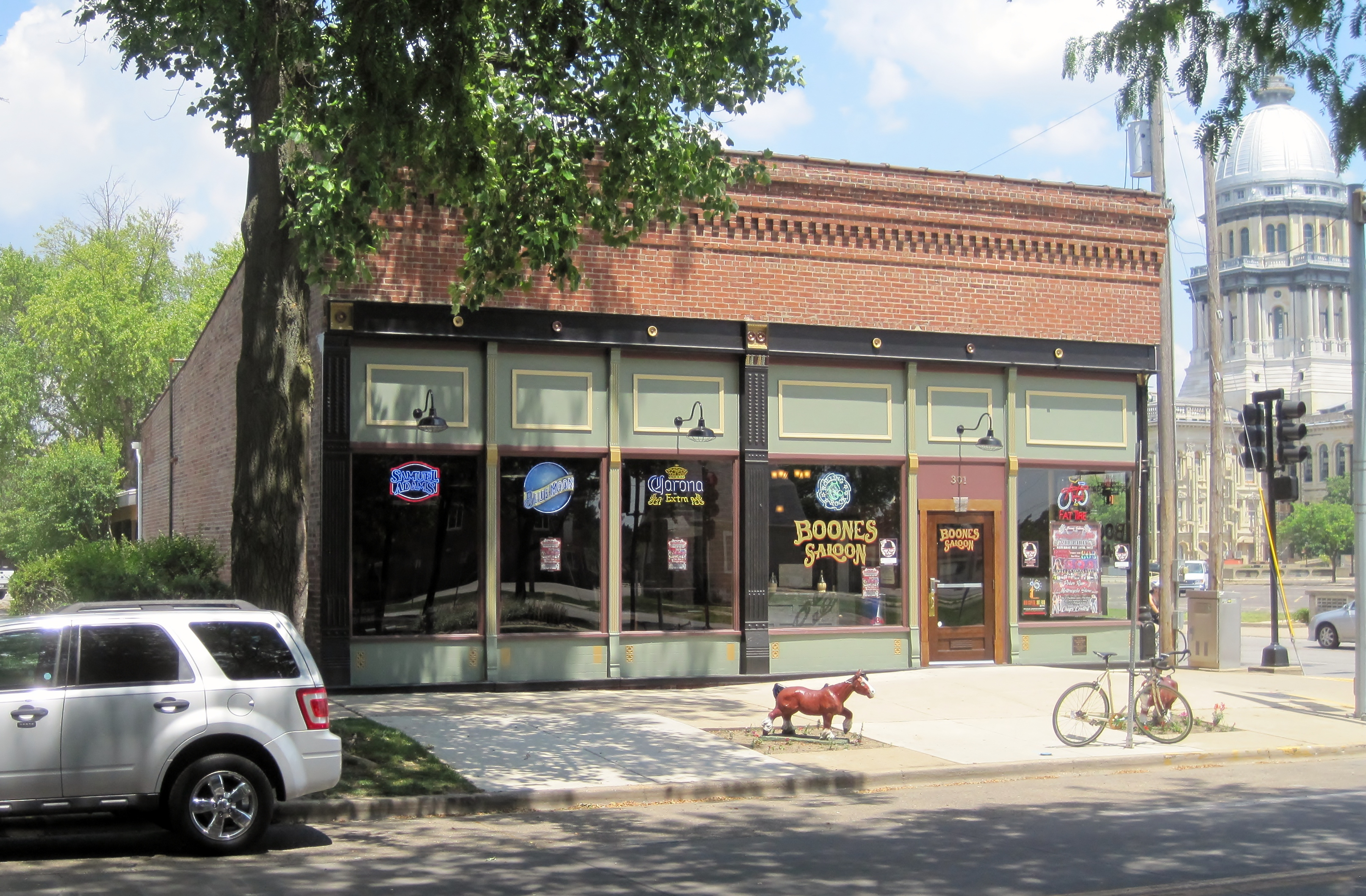

- Location within Illinois Location within the United States
- Location: 301 W. Edwards St., Springfield, Illinois
- Coordinates: 39°47′47″N 89°39′28″W
- Area: 0.1 acres (0.040 ha)
- Built: 1898
- Architectural style: Commercial Style
- NRHP reference No.: 85000607
- Added to NRHP: March 18, 1985

The Fred Gottschalk Grocery Store is a historic grocery store building located at 301 West Edwards Street in Springfield, Illinois. Fred Gottschalk opened his first store at the site in 1887; he built the present building in 1898. The brick building has a Commercial style design with a cast iron storefront and a corbelled cornice. The store, one of several groceries in the area, served many of Springfield's prominent politicians and their families; it also allowed its customers to purchase goods by telephone. Gottschalk and his son Arthur ran the store until 1971; the building is now one of the few surviving neighborhood groceries in Springfield.

The store was added to the National Register of Historic Places on March 18, 1985.
