= Heimberger House =

Historic house in Illinois, United States

- U.S. National Register of Historic Places
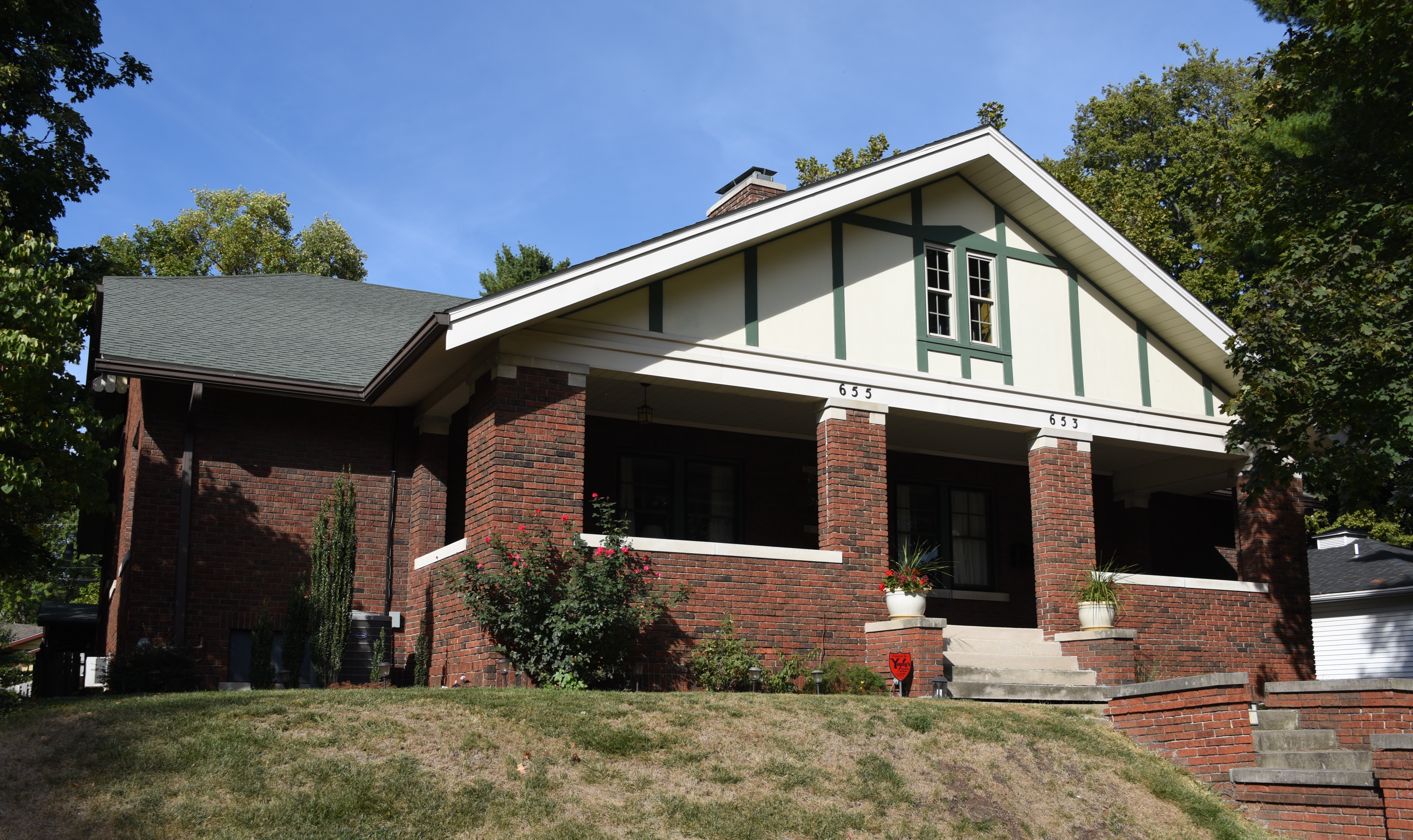

- Location within Illinois Location within the United States
- Location: 653-655 W. Vine St. Springfield, Illinois
- Coordinates: 39°47′18″N 89°39′55″W
- Built: 1915
- Architectural style: Arts and Crafts
- NRHP reference No.: 14000154
- Added to NRHP: April 21, 2014

The Heimberger House is a historic house located at 653-655 West Vine Street in Springfield, Illinois. The two-family house was built in 1915; it was designed to resemble a single-family house to blend in with the surrounding neighborhood. Harry Jasper Reiger designed the Arts and Crafts style bungalow. The house has a characteristic low-pitched Craftsman roof with exposed rafters, wide eaves, and clipped gables. Skylights in the roof let natural light into the interior rooms, an uncommon feature for a Craftsman bungalow. The front porch is covered by a large half-timbered gable and features ornamental tiling.

The house was added to the National Register of Historic Places on April 21, 2014.
