= Price-Prather House =

Historic house in Illinois, United States

- U.S. National Register of Historic Places
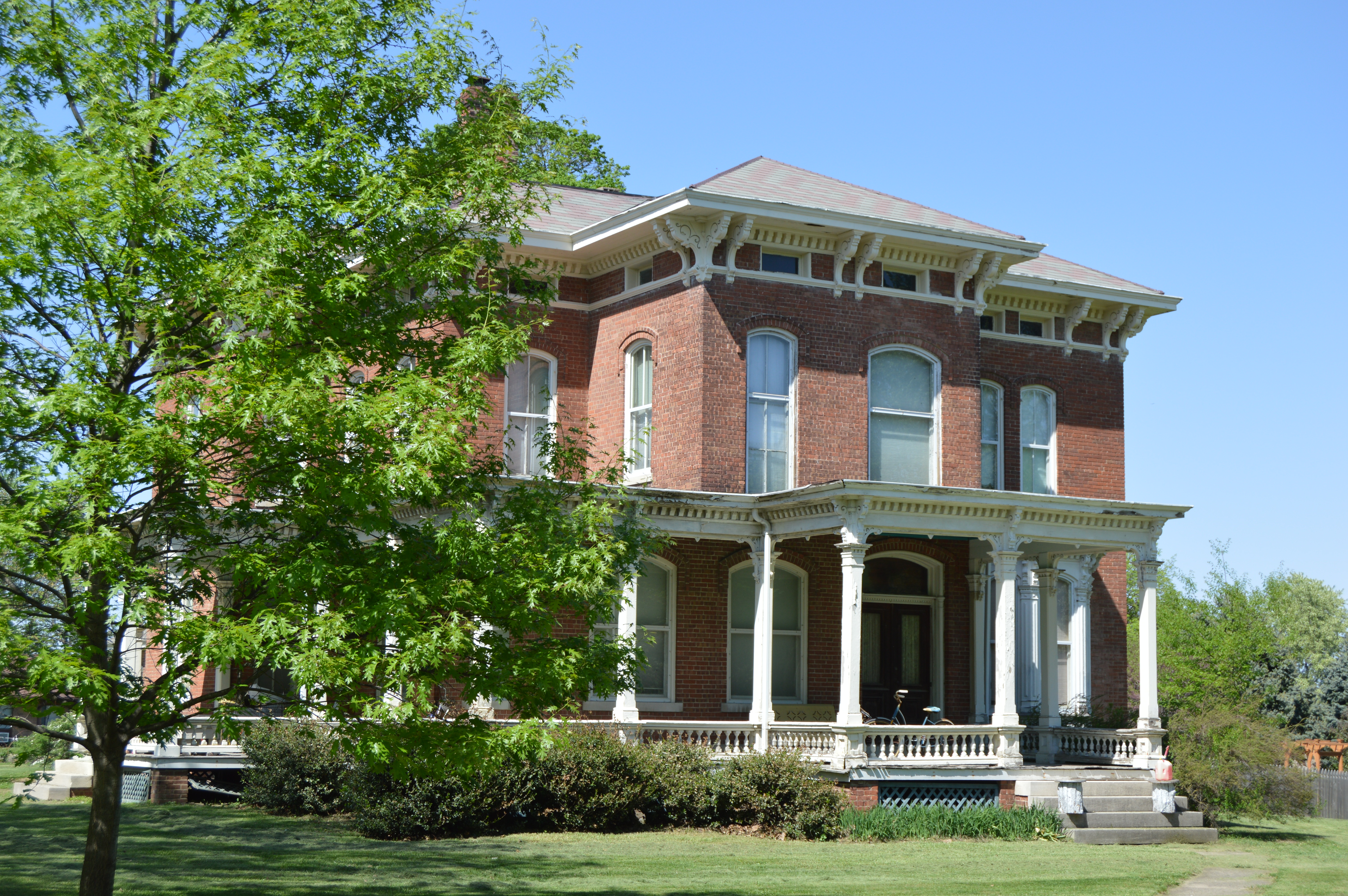

- Location within Illinois Location within the United States
- Location: Jct. of Main and Elkhart Sts., Williamsville, Illinois
- Coordinates: 39°57′17″N 89°32′47″W
- Area: less than one acre
- Built: 1868
- Architectural style: Italianate
- NRHP reference No.: 91000574
- Added to NRHP: May 13, 1991

The Price-Prather House is a historic house located at the intersection of Main and Elkhart Streets in Williamsville, Illinois. The house was built in 1868 for livestock breeder James R. Price. The Italianate house features a multi-component slate roof, a bracketed and dentillated cornice, a wraparound front porch, and long arched windows with brick hoods. Cattle breeder John F. Prather purchased the house in 1882. Prather was an influential Shorthorn cattle breeder; as one of the earliest cattlemen to breed shorthorns in Illinois, he became recognized as an authority on the breed, and he served as president of the American Shorthorn Association and a member of the State Board of Agriculture.

The house was added to the National Register of Historic Places on May 13, 1991.
