= Bell Miller Apartments =

- U.S. National Register of Historic Places
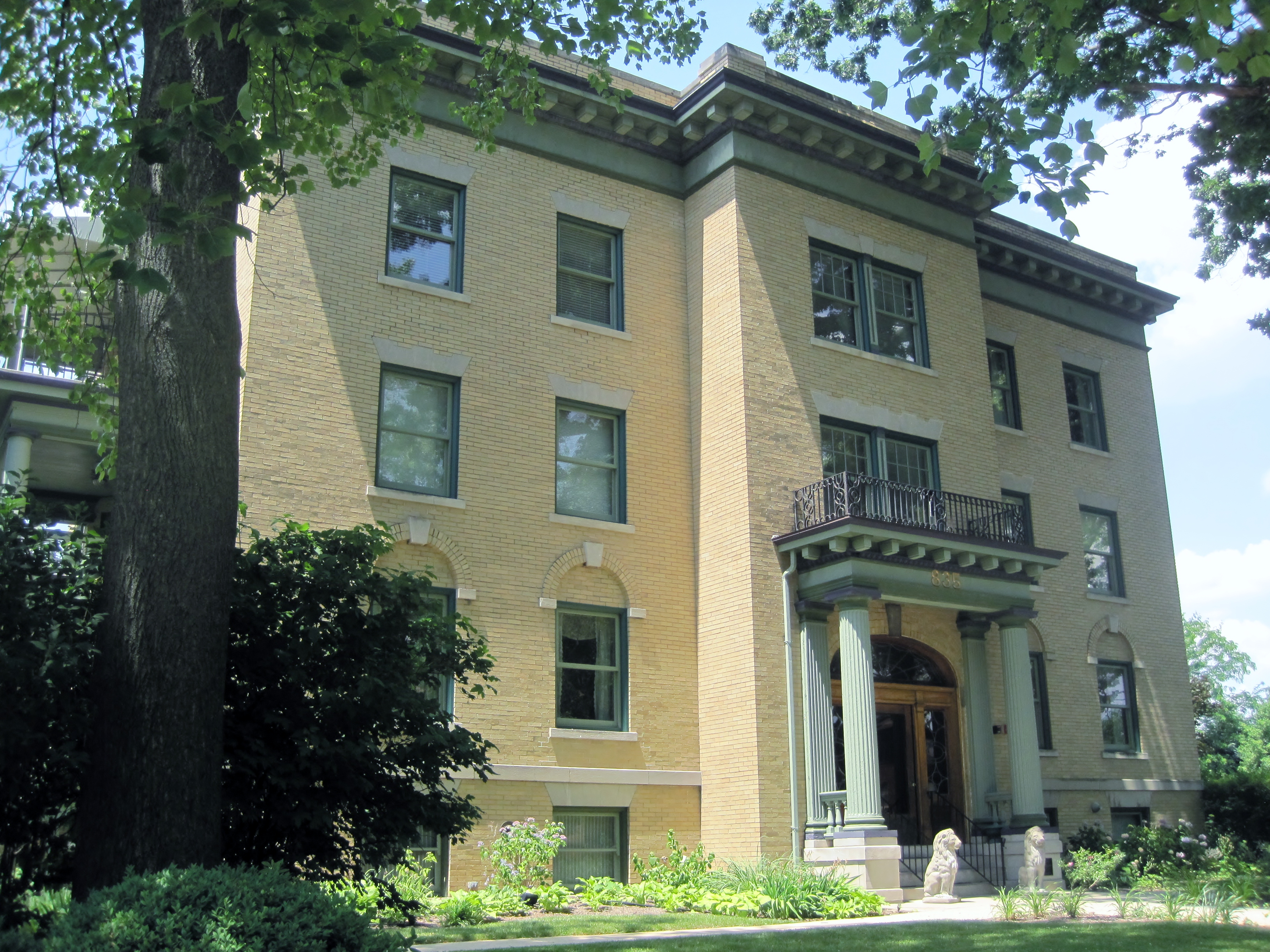

- Location within Illinois Location within the United States
- Interactive map showing the location of Bell Miller Apartments
- Location: 835 S. Second St., Springfield, Illinois
- Coordinates: 39°47′33″N 89°39′14″W
- Area: less than one acre
- Built: 1909
- Architect: Helmle, George H.
- Architectural style: Classical Revival
- NRHP reference No.: 95001242
- Added to NRHP: November 7, 1995

The Bell Miller Apartments are a historic apartment building located at 835 South Second Street in Springfield, Illinois. The six-flat apartments were built in 1909 by Bell Miller, a local florist branching out into real estate. Architect George H. Helmle designed the three-story Classical Revival building. The building's design features an entrance pavilion supported by Doric columns, verandahs on both sides, and an egg-and-dart frieze and dentillated cornice along the roof line. The interior also featured the style, as stairways with Classical balustrades led to each apartment. The apartments were part of a wave of new apartment buildings constructed in Springfield's Aristocracy Hill neighborhood in the 1910s and 1920s. The new apartments were advertised as "luxury apartments" and featured privacy and amenities designed to attract middle-class professionals, successfully countering the stigma that apartments were low-class housing. The Bell Miller Apartments stood apart even from these other buildings due to its commitment to Classical decoration both inside and out; while other buildings had formally styled exteriors, few featured as lavish of interiors. The building is currently owned by the Conn Hospitality Group, and operates as a bed and breakfast under the name of The Inn at 835.

The building was added to the National Register of Historic Places on November 7, 1995.
