= Cornelius Flagg Farmstead =

- U.S. National Register of Historic Places
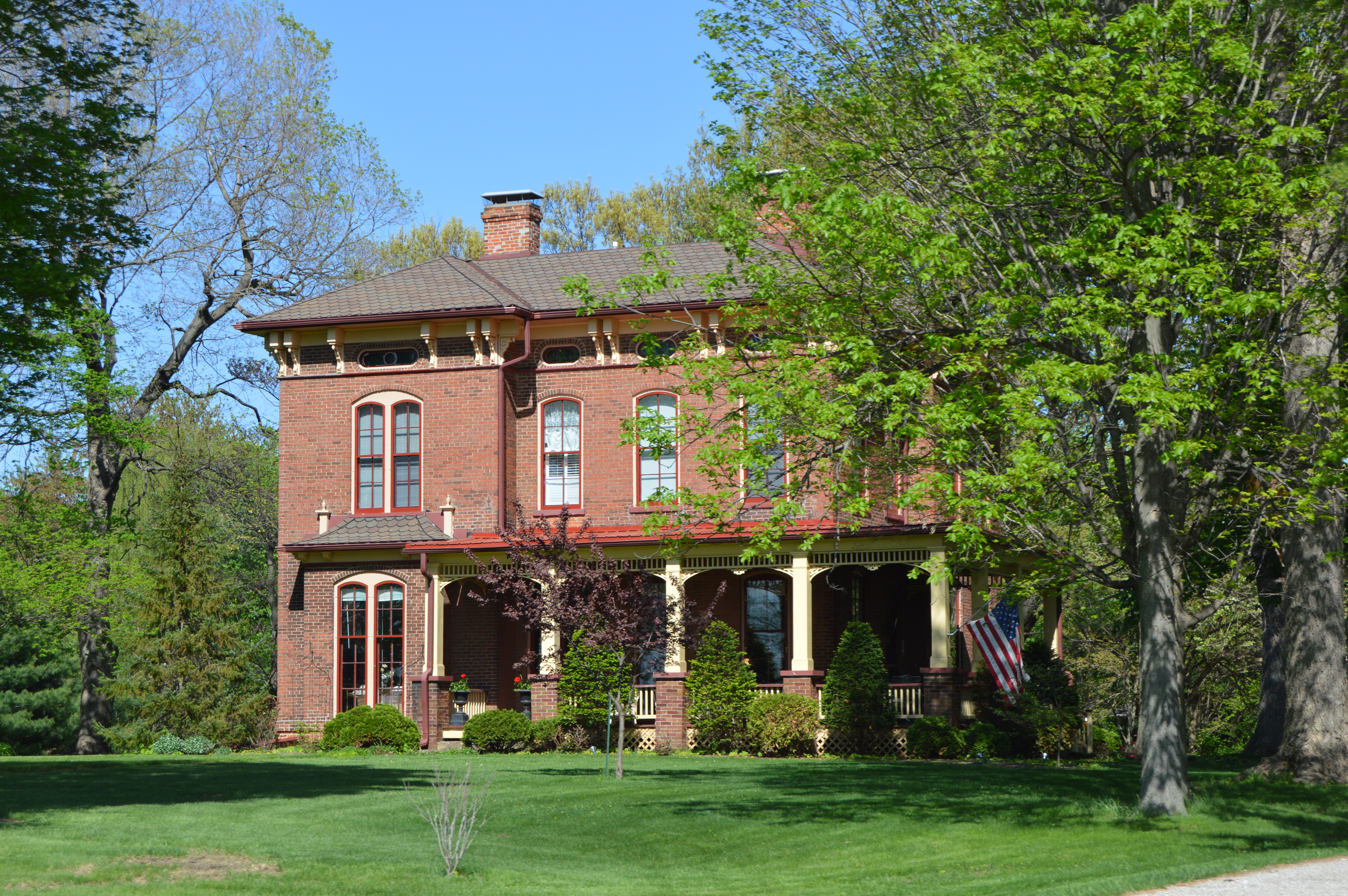

- Location within Illinois Location within the United States
- Nearest city: Sherman, Illinois
- Coordinates: 39°53′27″N 89°36′57″W
- Area: 4.7 acres (1.9 ha)
- Built: 1871-1880
- Built by: Bettinghaus, Henry
- Architectural style: Italianate
- NRHP reference No.: 92001848
- Added to NRHP: February 3, 1993

The Cornelius Flagg Farmstead is a historic farm located on Tipton School Road in Sherman, Illinois. Cornelius Flagg, a farmer and lumber businessman from Ohio, established the farm in the 1870s. The farmhouse, the farm's main building, is a two-story brick Italianate building. The house has an asymmetrical pattern with hip roofs over each component. Several of its key Italianate features are not original; the wraparound front porch was replaced in 1930, and its bracketed cornice was reconstructed in the 1940s after tornadoes damaged the roof. The farm's brick barn is unusually well-crafted for a barn built during the period, a sign of Flagg's wealth. Other buildings on the farm include a machinery shed, a smaller and older farmhouse, a privy, and an ice house.

The farm was added to the National Register of Historic Places on February 3, 1993.
