= Gov. Richard Yates House =

Historic house in Illinois, United States

- U.S. National Register of Historic Places
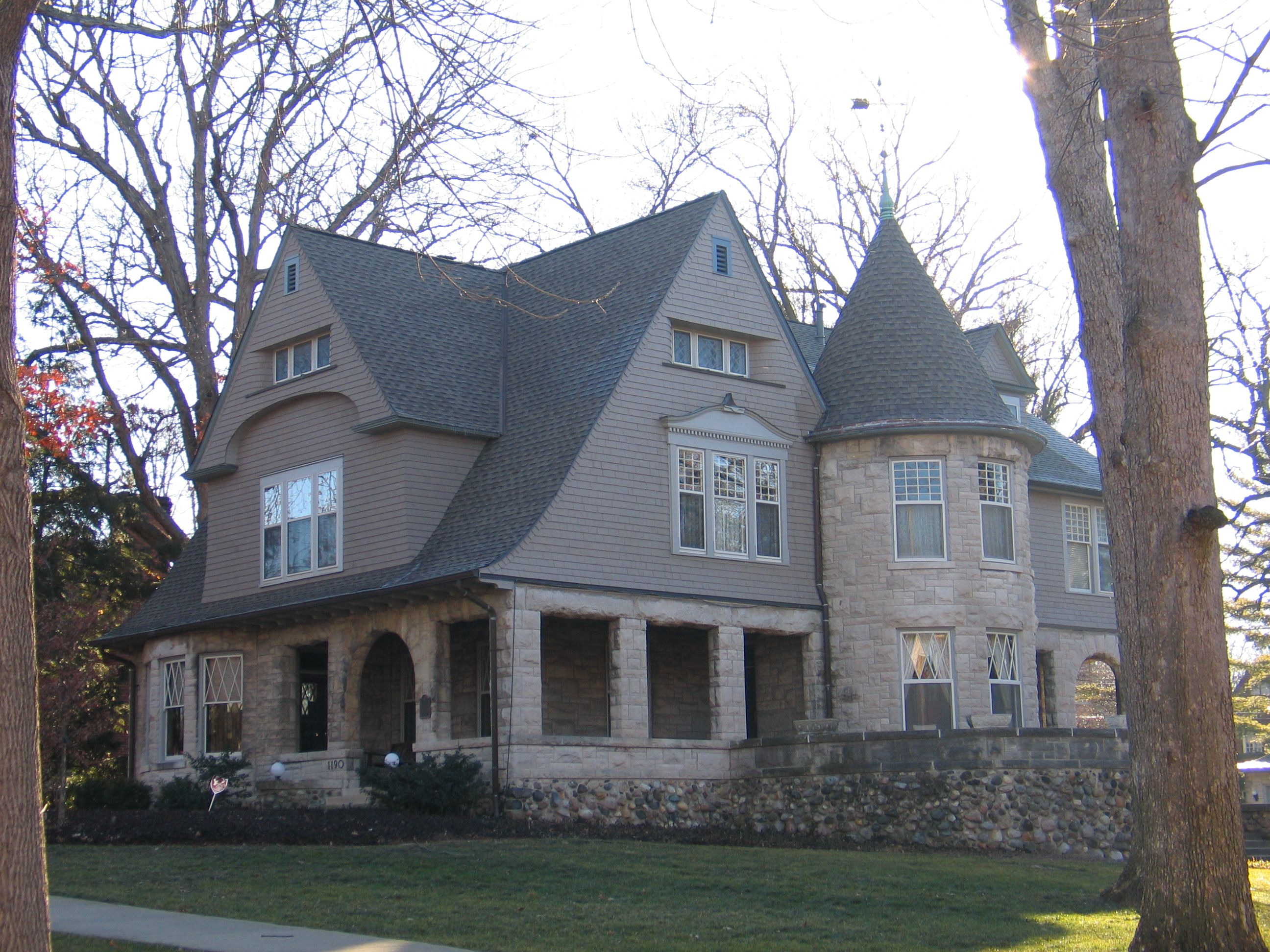

- Location within Illinois Location within the United States
- Location: 1190 Williams Blvd., Springfield, Illinois
- Coordinates: 39°47′24″N 89°40′20″W
- Area: less than one acre
- Built: 1904-05
- Built by: Culver, James
- Architect: Helmle & Helmle
- Architectural style: Romanesque, Queen Anne
- NRHP reference No.: 84001148
- Added to NRHP: March 1, 1984

The Gov. Richard Yates House is a historic house located at 1190 Williams Boulevard in Springfield, Illinois. The house was built in 1904–05 for Illinois governor Richard Yates, Jr. Architects Helmle and Helmle designed the house, which has Romanesque Revival and Queen Anne influences. The house's first floor has rusticated stone walls, as do both stories of the turret on the west side; it is a rare example of rusticated stone in a residential Helmle & Helmle design. The front entrance opens to a great hall, which connects the interior rooms; this arrangement allowed Yates to host political gatherings in his home. A landing in front of the fireplace provided a raised space for Yates or his guests to give speeches. Yates left the governor's office the same year his house was completed; he later served in the U.S. House of Representatives from 1919 to 1933.

The house was added to the National Register of Historic Places on March 1, 1984.
