= H. P. Boult House =

Historic house in Illinois, United States

- U.S. National Register of Historic Places
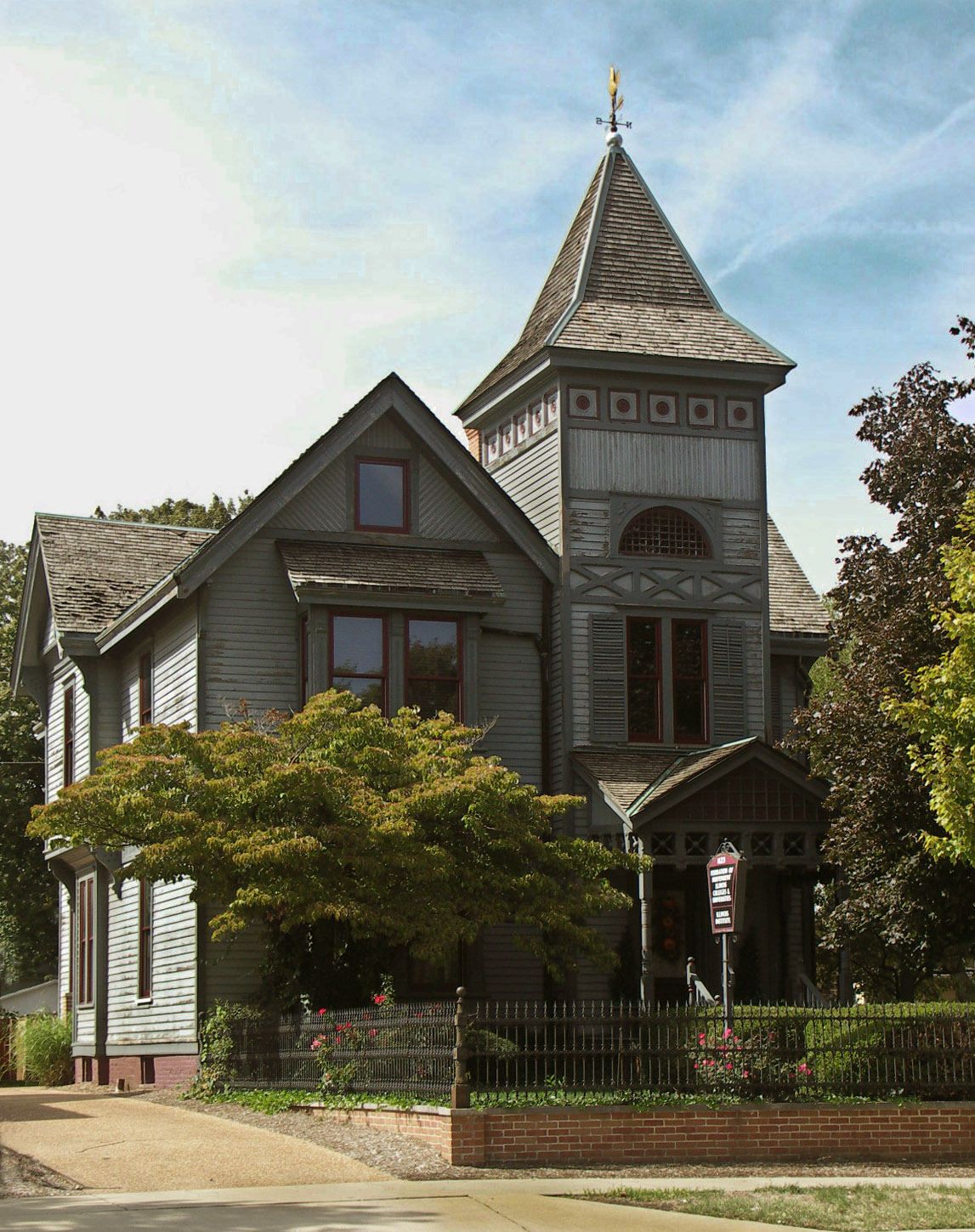

- Location within Illinois Location within the United States
- Interactive map showing the location of H.P. Boult House
- Location: 1123 S. 2nd St., Springfield, Illinois
- Coordinates: 39°47′19.44″N 89°39′14.48″W
- Area: less than one acre
- Built: 1889
- Architectural style: Queen Anne
- NRHP reference No.: 82002598
- Added to NRHP: June 3, 1982

The H. P. Boult House is a historic house located at 1123 South 2nd Street in Springfield, Illinois. The house, which was built in 1889, has a Queen Anne design with Eastlake ornamentation. The two-story wooden house has horizontal siding and X-shaped bracing. The front porch features a gable with a carved pediment, projecting carved panels, and a latticed base. A tower rises above the front porch; the other half of the front facade is dominated by a gable. The house's interior features a curved cherry staircase, decorative woodwork throughout, and a painted slate fireplace.

The house was added to the National Register of Historic Places on June 3, 1982.
