= Rippon-Kinsella House =

Historic house in Illinois, United States

- Rippon--Kinsella House
- U.S. National Register of Historic Places
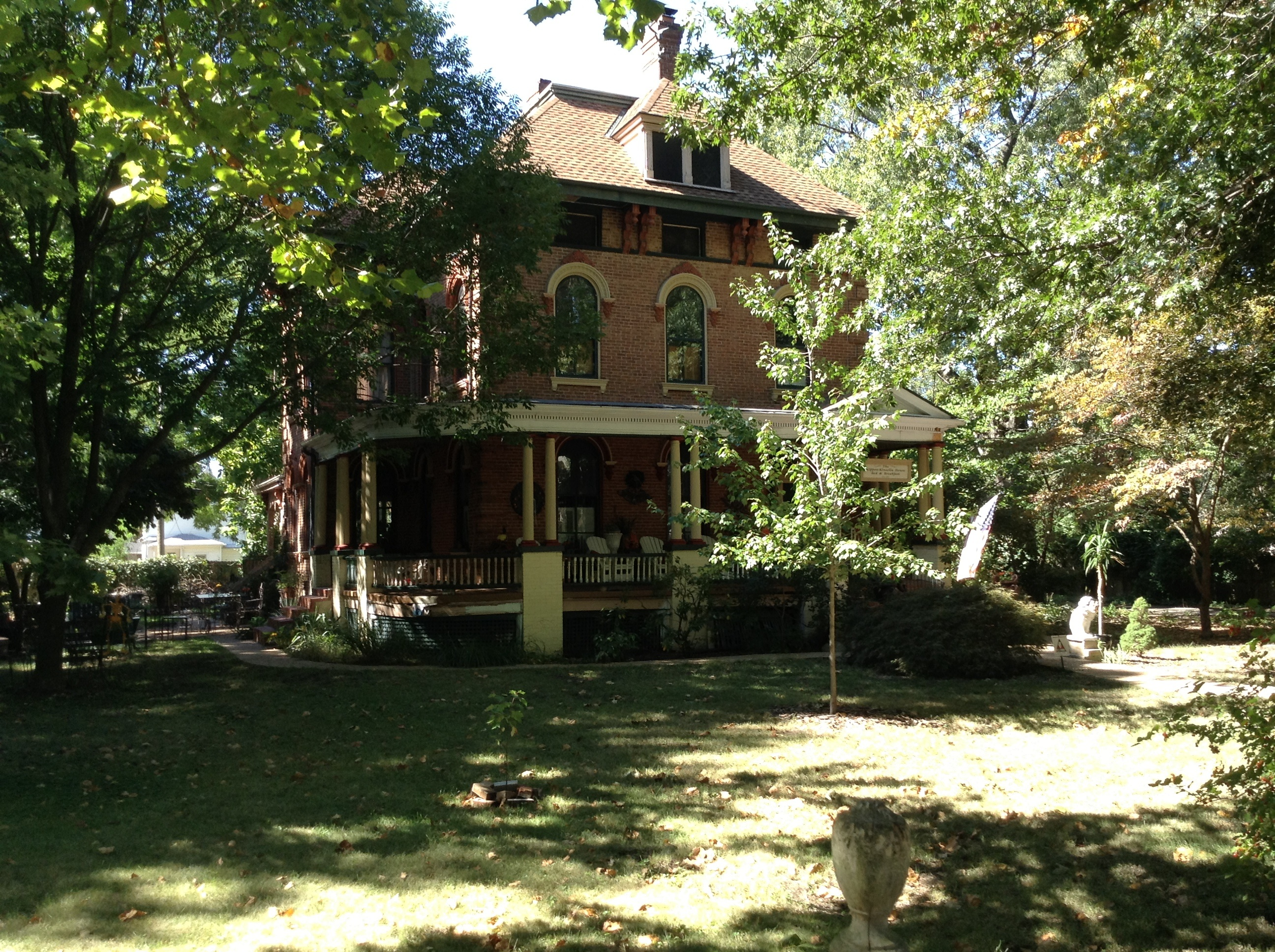

- Location within Illinois Location within the United States
- Location: 1317 N. Third St., Springfield, Illinois
- Coordinates: 39°49′1″N 89°39′6″W
- Area: less than one acre
- Built: 1871
- Architectural style: Classical Revival, Italianate
- NRHP reference No.: 92000073
- Added to NRHP: February 27, 1992

The Rippon-Kinsella House is a historic house located at 1317 North Third Street in Springfield, Illinois. The house was most likely built in 1871 for businessman John Rippon Jr. Its original design was a simple Italianate plan; the style can still be seen in its bracketed eaves and its long arched windows with round hoods. Rippon sold the house in 1891, and after passing through several other owners it was bought by Richard "Dick" Kinsella in 1899. Kinsella ran a local wallpaper and paint business, worked as a scout for the New York Giants baseball team, and was a prominent Sangamon County Democrat. In 1905, Kinsella remodeled his house to incorporate Classical elements; the house's porch with Doric columns and its high-pitched roof were added at this time. Classical Revival architecture was popular in both new and remodeled houses in Springfield at the time, and the more traditional Italianate houses were well-suited to renovations; the house is one of the best-preserved examples of these hybrid designs.

The house was added to the National Register of Historic Places on February 27, 1992.
