= Leland Grove, Illinois =

- City
- City of Leland Grove
- Location of Leland Grove in Sangamon County, Illinois.
- Coordinates: 39°46′43″N 89°41′02″W
- Country: United States
- State: Illinois
- County: Sangamon
- Township: Woodside

Area
  - Total: 0.63 sq mi (1.63 km^{2})
  - Land: 0.63 sq mi (1.63 km^{2})
  - Water: 0 sq mi (0.00 km^{2})
- Elevation: 564 ft (172 m)

Population (2020)
  - Total: 1,454
  - Density: 2,316.9/sq mi (894.57/km^{2})
- Time zone: UTC-6 (CST)
  - Summer (DST): UTC-5 (CDT)
- ZIP code: 62704
- Area code: 217
- FIPS code: 17-42769
- GNIS feature ID: 2395675
- Website: http://www.lelandgrove.com/

Leland Grove is a city in Sangamon County, Illinois, United States, located adjacent to Springfield. It is part of the Springfield Metropolitan Statistical Area. As of the 2020 census, Leland Grove had a population of 1,454.

== History ==
Leland Grove was incorporated by a referendum of residents of several subdivisions in Woodside Township in April 1950 in order to improve the roads in the area, which at the time were mostly unpaved dirt roads. The city had an initial population of 1,060 people, and later grew by annexing additional subdivisions in the area. The new city succeeded in paving nine miles of roads in its first year and half, although this led to a significant budget deficit. The first city government, consisting of a mayor, clerk, treasurer and six aldermen, was voted in without opposition on June 20, 1950.

Like the neighboring village of Jerome, Leland Grove took its name from Jerome Leland, a prominent local farmer who hosted local events at a grove on his farm in the late 19th century. Much of the food served in Springfield's Leland Hotel was grown on the Leland farm. The Leland farmhouse stood in Leland Grove until 2021, when it was demolished by its owner, Frank Vala. In 2022, the summer kitchen outbuilding from the farmhouse was moved from the site to Washington Park in Springfield.

In 1957, Leland Grove residents (known as "Grovers") defeated a bid by the city of Springfield to annex their city. The question was put to a vote in both cities, and both city governments favored annexation. The outcome in Springfield was 5 to 1 in favor, but Grovers voted 3 to 1 against. After the vote, Springfield withdrew fire protection from Leland Grove, which was left without fire protection until 1959. Subsequent efforts by Springfield to annex Leland Grove and neighboring villages followed in 1960, 1971 and 1976, but were also unsuccessful.

For the first twenty years of its existence, Leland Grove did not have a police department. Initially traffic enforcement was handled by residents calling the city government to report if a delivery truck had violated traffic laws, and then a city officer would contact the delivery company to report the violation. In 1966, the city hired a private security agency. The city has maintained its own police force since 1970.

== Geography ==
According to the 2010 census, Leland Grove has a total area of 0.63 square miles (1.63 km^{2}), all land.

== Demographics ==
Historical population
Census	Pop.	Note	%±
1960	1,731		—
1970	1,624		−6.2%
1980	1,864		14.8%
1990	1,679		−9.9%
2000	1,592		−5.2%
2010	1,503		−5.6%
2020	1,454		−3.3%
U.S. Decennial Census

=== 2020 census ===
As of the 2020 census, Leland Grove had a population of 1,454. The median age was 50.6 years. 17.3% of residents were under the age of 18 and 29.4% of residents were 65 years of age or older. For every 100 females there were 93.9 males, and for every 100 females age 18 and over there were 94.8 males age 18 and over.

100.0% of residents lived in urban areas, while 0.0% lived in rural areas.

There were 679 households in Leland Grove, of which 24.0% had children under the age of 18 living in them. Of all households, 54.3% were married-couple households, 16.2% were households with a male householder and no spouse or partner present, and 24.6% were households with a female householder and no spouse or partner present. About 29.7% of all households were made up of individuals and 14.5% had someone living alone who was 65 years of age or older.

There were 711 housing units, of which 4.5% were vacant. The homeowner vacancy rate was 2.9% and the rental vacancy rate was 1.8%.

Racial composition as of the 2020 census
Race	Number	Percent
White	1,321	90.9%
Black or African American	29	2.0%
American Indian and Alaska Native	0	0.0%
Asian	27	1.9%
Native Hawaiian and Other Pacific Islander	0	0.0%
Some other race	12	0.8%
Two or more races	65	4.5%
Hispanic or Latino (of any race)	40	2.8%

=== 2000 census ===
As of the census of 2000, there were 1,592 people, 693 households, and 501 families residing in the city. The population density was 2,540.3 inhabitants per square mile (980.8/km^{2}). There were 724 housing units at an average density of 1,155.3 per square mile (446.1/km^{2}). The racial makeup of the city was 97.30% White, 0.44% African American, 0.13% Native American, 0.88% Asian, 0.31% from other races, and 0.94% from two or more races. Hispanic or Latino of any race were 1.01% of the population.

There were 693 households, out of which 25.7% had children under the age of 18 living with them, 63.5% were married couples living together, 7.4% had a female householder with no husband present, and 27.7% were non-families. 24.4% of all households were made up of individuals, and 11.1% had someone living alone who was 65 years of age or older. The average household size was 2.30 and the average family size was 2.73.

In the city the population was spread out, with 21.0% under the age of 18, 3.5% from 18 to 24, 20.9% from 25 to 44, 33.7% from 45 to 64, and 20.8% who were 65 years of age or older. The median age was 47 years. For every 100 females, there were 85.1 males. For every 100 females age 18 and over, there were 84.9 males.

The median income for a household in the city was $75,437, and the median income for a family was $92,245. Males had a median income of $62,308 versus $45,673 for females. The per capita income for the city was $51,714. It has the highest per-capita income of any city outside the Chicago metropolitan area. None of the families and 2.7% of the population were living below the poverty line, including no under eighteens and 5.0% of those over 64.

== Transportation ==
SMTD provides bus service on Route 8 connecting Leland Grove to downtown Springfield and other destinations.
