= Rochester, Illinois =

Rochester
- Village
- Location of Rochester in Sangamon County, Illinois.
- Coordinates: 39°44′50″N 89°31′51″W
- Country: United States
- State: Illinois
- County: Sangamon
- Township: Rochester
- Settled: 1819

Area
  - Total: 2.65 sq mi (6.86 km^{2})
  - Land: 2.64 sq mi (6.85 km^{2})
  - Water: 0.0039 sq mi (0.01 km^{2})
- Elevation: 577 ft (176 m)

Population (2020)
  - Total: 3,863
  - Density: 1,460.1/sq mi (563.75/km^{2})
- Time zone: UTC-6 (CST)
  - Summer (DST): UTC-5 (CDT)
- ZIP code: 62563
- Area code: 217
- FIPS code: 17-64759
- GNIS feature ID: 2399100
- Website: Rochester website

Rochester is a village and suburb of Springfield in Sangamon County, Illinois, United States. As of the 2020 census, Rochester had a population of 3,863. The village was settled in 1819, and is located in Rochester Township.

Rochester is part of the Springfield, Illinois Metropolitan Statistical Area.

== Geography ==
Rochester is located four miles (6.4 km) outside Springfield, Illinois, down Illinois State Route 29. The village is exit 96A off Interstate 55.

According to the 2010 census, Rochester has a total area of 2.431 square miles (6.30 km^{2}), of which 2.43 square miles (6.29 km^{2}) (or 99.96%) is land and 0.001 square miles (0.00 km^{2}) (or 0.04%) is water.

== Demographics ==
Historical population
Census	Pop.	Note	%±
1880	307		—
1900	365		—
1910	444		21.6%
1920	399		−10.1%
1930	427		7.0%
1940	464		8.7%
1950	506		9.1%
1960	742		46.6%
1970	1,667		124.7%
1980	2,488		49.3%
1990	2,676		7.6%
2000	2,893		8.1%
2010	3,689		27.5%
2020	3,863		4.7%
U.S. Decennial Census

=== 2020 census ===
As of the 2020 census, Rochester had a population of 3,863. The median age was 41.1 years. 26.2% of residents were under the age of 18 and 18.9% of residents were 65 years of age or older. For every 100 females there were 92.2 males, and for every 100 females age 18 and over there were 89.4 males age 18 and over.

98.4% of residents lived in urban areas, while 1.6% lived in rural areas.

There were 1,460 households in Rochester, of which 37.0% had children under the age of 18 living in them. Of all households, 62.9% were married-couple households, 10.1% were households with a male householder and no spouse or partner present, and 22.9% were households with a female householder and no spouse or partner present. About 21.3% of all households were made up of individuals and 13.2% had someone living alone who was 65 years of age or older.

There were 1,509 housing units, of which 3.2% were vacant. The homeowner vacancy rate was 1.9% and the rental vacancy rate was 6.6%.

Racial composition as of the 2020 census
Race	Number	Percent
White	3,546	91.8%
Black or African American	38	1.0%
American Indian and Alaska Native	3	0.1%
Asian	43	1.1%
Native Hawaiian and Other Pacific Islander	0	0.0%
Some other race	26	0.7%
Two or more races	207	5.4%
Hispanic or Latino (of any race)	59	1.5%

=== 2000 census ===
As of the census of 2000, there were 2,893 people, 1,075 households, and 868 families residing in the village. The population density was 1,372.9 inhabitants per square mile (530.1/km^{2}). There were 1,099 housing units at an average density of 521.6 per square mile (201.4/km^{2}). The racial makeup of the village was 98.65% White, 0.28% African American, 0.03% Native American, 0.38% Asian, 0.03% Pacific Islander, 0.10% from other races, and 0.52% from two or more races. Hispanic or Latino of any race were 0.69% of the population.

There were 1,075 households, out of which 39.4% had children under the age of 18 living with them, 70.7% were married couples living together, 8.1% had a female householder with no husband present, and 19.2% were non-families. 18.1% of all households were made up of individuals, and 9.9% had someone living alone who was 65 years of age or older. The average household size was 2.69 and the average family size was 3.05.

In the village, the population was spread out, with 27.5% under the age of 18, 6.3% from 18 to 24, 25.2% from 25 to 44, 29.7% from 45 to 64, and 11.3% who were 65 years of age or older. The median age was 40 years. For every 100 females, there were 94.0 males. For every 100 females age 18 and over, there were 88.3 males.

The median income for a household in the village was $62,891, and the median income for a family was $73,191. Males had a median income of $50,875 versus $35,944 for females. The per capita income for the village was $26,881. About 0.8% of families and 1.2% of the population were below the poverty line, including 1.3% of those under age 18 and 0.9% of those age 65 or over.

== Parks and recreation ==
Located on the northwest side of the village is the Rochester Community Park, erected and operated by the Village of Rochester. The late 1990s saw massive expansion on the park, with the addition of a lighted ballfield, multiple soccer fields, and the Friendship Fort, a massive play-structure built in 1998. The park hosts many village events, including "Sparks In The Park", an annual Independence Day festival with vendors, entertainment, a carnival, and a parade. Spanning three days, the event attracts not only the citizens of Rochester, but visitors from the surrounding areas as well.

Rochester is the southeastern end of the Lost Bridge Trail, a 5.0-mile (8.0 km) trail built by the Illinois Department of Transportation (IDOT) atop an abandoned railbed formerly used by the Baltimore and Ohio (B&O) railroad. It is operated jointly by IDNR and the Village of Rochester. The trail crosses the South Fork of the Sangamon River near Rochester, and crosses Sugar Creek near Springfield. Sugar Creek carries the outflow from Lake Springfield, a sizable nearby reservoir. The Lost Bridge trail name recalls IDOT's failure to prevent salvagers affiliated with the B&O from dismantling the Sugar Creek bridge for scrap.

IDOT future plans include extending the trail to Taylorville, Illinois along the same railroad bed, and this was partly realized in a recent extension from the trail's original end at State Rte. 29 and N. Main St., across Rochester, to just past the intersection of State Rte. 29 and State St.

== Education ==
Rochester's schools are part of District 3A, headed by district superintendent Rolf Sivertson. The district lists its enrollment at 2,322 students for the 2015-2016 year.

Rochester High School students, along with the rest of the state, are no longer required as part of the state's standardized testing program. The PARCC is the new standard for the state and in the first year of testing 91.9% of all freshmen are on track to graduate (Illinois statewide is 82.4%) and in 2016 Rochester had an overall graduation rate of 99% (94% in 4 years) as compared to the state rate of 86%.

In 2015, Rochester High School teachers on average make $48,052, while administrators make $87,488 on average with a 13:1 student:staff ratio.

Construction on a new wing to the high school began in July 2005, and was finished in August 2006. Demolition of the old Rochester Junior High building also took place in the summer of 2006, and junior high students occupied most of the new wing until the new junior high facility was fully completed. A new auditorium was also being constructed for the district, and it was scheduled to be completed in early 2007. The new junior high facility was completed by January 2008. The new auditorium was completed in time for the spring musical.

=== Sports championships ===
Rochester High School teams have won the following championships:

- 2007, girls soccer team won the 2A State Championship.
- 2010, football team was undefeated and became the Class 4A State Champions.
- 2011, football team was 12-2 and won the 4A State Championship for the second straight year.
- 2012, football team won the 4A State Championship for a third year in a row.
- 2013, football team won the 4A State Championship for the fourth year in a row.
- 2014, football team won the 4A State Championship for the fifth year in a row.
- 2015, girls golf team won the Class A State Championship.
- 2015, girls soccer team won the 2A State Championship.
- 2016, girls soccer team won the 2A State Championship for the second year in a row.
- 2016, football team won the 4A State Championship for the sixth time in seven years.
- 2017, football team won the 4A State Championship for the seventh time in eight years.
- 2019, football team won the 5A State Championship as a result of reclassification in regards to the Chicago Teachers Strike.
- 2023, football team won the 4A State Championship, the 9th in school history.

== Notable person ==
- Hank Beatty, college football wide receiver, attended high school in Rochester
