= List of City of Springfield Historic Sites =

List of local historic sites in Springfield, Illinois

Historic Sites is a designation of the City of Springfield's Historic Sites Commission. Many of these landmarks are also listed on the National Register of Historic Places.

== Historic Preservation Commission ==
The City of Springfield's Historic Sites Commission maintains the registry of landmarks and historic districts and recommend historic designation to the city council. The commission was established in Chapter 101, Ordinance § 101.03.

=== Criteria ===
The criteria for inclusion in the historic register are laid out in Ordinance § 101.10.

The commission shall consider the following criteria in determining whether to recommend an improvement for historic designation:

1. Significant value as part of the historical, archaeological, cultural, artistic, social or other heritage of the nation, state, or city;
2. Association with an important person or event in national, state, or local history;
3. Representative of the distinguishing characteristics of architectural type, period, or method of construction, or the notable work of a master builder, designer, architect, or artist, or a work that possesses high artistic value or that represents a significant and distinguishable entity although its components may lack individual distinction;
4. Any additional criteria established by the rules promulgated by the commission.

== List of landmarks ==
=== Individual landmarks ===
| Landmark Name | Image | Location | Built | Style | NRHP date |
|---|---|---|---|---|---|
| President Abraham Lincoln Home | | 413 S 8th St | 1839 | | August 18, 1971 |
| Claus Grocery Store | | 1700 S 11th St | 1905 | | |
| Constant & Groves Chevrolet Building | | 425 S 4th St | | | |
| Adams House | | 2315 Clear Lake Ave | | | |
| Allen Miller House | | 511 S 8th St | | | |
| Bell Miller Apartments | | 835 S 6th St | | | |
| Booth-Grunendike Mansion | | 500 S 6th St | c. 1870 | Second Empire | |
| Bunn-Sankey House | | 1001 S 6th St | 1883 | Queen Anne (Half-Timbered) | |
| Bernard Stuve House | | 526 S 7th St | 1869 | Italianate | |
| Camp Lincoln Commissary Building | | 1301 N MacArthur Blvd | 1903 | | November 13, 1984 |
| Charles Arnold House | | 810 E Jackson St | | | |
| Charles Corneau House | | 426 S 8th St | c. 1849 | | |
| Chatterton Place | | 123/125 S 5th St | 1853 | Eclectic | |
| Clarkson W. Freeman House | | 704 W Monroe St | 1878 | Italianate, Carpenter-Gothic trim | September 29, 1980 |
| Congressman James M.Graham House | | 413 S 7th St | 1862 | Italianate | May 1, 1989 |
| Cook House | | 508 S 8th St | c. 1850 | | |
| Cranmer-Cook House | | 926 South 7th Street | 1877 | Italianate | |
| Dana-Thomas House | | 301 E Lawrence Ave | 1902-1904 | Prairie Style | July 30, 1974 |
| Decker House | | 303 S Glenwood Ave | 1864 | Italianate | |
| Elijah Iles House | | 628 S 7th St | 1837 | Greek Revival | February 23, 1978 |
| Executive Mansion | | 410 E Jackson St | 1855 | Italianate | July 19, 1976 |
| Fisher-Latham Building | | 111/113/115 North 6th St | 1850s | 19th Century classically inspired | April 28, 2000 |
| George M. Brinkerhoff House | | 1500 N 5th St | 1869 | Italianate | December 18, 1978 |
| Grant Store/Harts’ Block | | 225 S 5th St | 1868 | Italianate | |
| Harriet Dean House | | 421 S 8th St | 1850s | | |
| Henson Robinson House | | 520 S 8th St | 1863-1866 | | |
| Hoogland Center for the Arts | | 420 S 6th St | | | |
| Illinois Hotel | | 401 E Washington St | 1903 | | |
| Illinois State Armory | | 107/111 E Monroe St | 1936 | Art Deco | |
| Illinois State Capitol | | 2nd & Capitol | 1868 - 1888 | Renaissance Revival, Second Empire | November 21, 1985 |
| Jessie K. DuBois House | | 519 S 8th St | | | |
| The INB Center The CILCO Building | | 322 E Capitol Ave | 1924 | Classical Revival, Beaux Arts | |
| James Morse House | | 818 E Capitol Ave | 1855 | | |
| Jennings Ford Building | | 431 S 4th St | | | |
| John L. Lewis House | | 1132 W Lawrence Ave | | | September 10, 1979 |
| Julia Sprigg House | | 507 S 8th St | | | |
| K-Mart / Kresge Building | | 127/131 S 5th St | | Art Deco | |
| Kirlin Building | | 107-111 S 7th St | 1889 | | |
| Lanphier Building | | 419/421 E Adams St | c. 1870–1884 | | |
| Lincoln Colored Home | | 427 S 12th St | 1904 | | August 6, 1998 |
| Lincoln-Herndon Law Office | | 6th & Adams St | 1840-1841 | Greek Revival | August 29, 1978 |
| Lincoln Tomb | | Oak Ridge Cemetery | 1869-1874 | | October 15, 1966 |
| Howard K. Weber House | | 925 S 7th St | 1840s | Italianate | October 1, 1979 |
| Lyon / Rosenwald House | | 413 S 8th St | 1850s | | |
| Nelson Building | | 117 S 7th St | | | |
| Old South Town Theater Marque | | 1110 S South Grand St | | | |
| Old State Capitol | | One Old State Capitol Plaza | 1837 to 1853 | Greek Revival | October 15, 1966 |
| Old State House Inn | | 101 E Adams St | | | |
| Pasfield House | | 404 W Jackson Pkwy | 1896 | | |
| Price/Wheeler House | | 618 S 7th St | 1899 | Classical Revival | February 14, 1985 |
| Rippon-Kinsella Home | | 1317 N 3rd St | c. 1870 | Italianate | February 27, 1992 |
| Robert Bullard House | | 1313 Leland Ave | 1906 | Prairie Style | |
| Shutt House | | 525 S 8th St | c. 1859 | | |
| Schnepp Block | | 314 E Adams St | 1912 | | |
| Solomon Allen Barn | | 530 S 8th St | | | |
| St. Nicholas Hotel | | 400 E Jefferson St | 1855 | Georgian Revival | February 10, 1983 |
| The Wetterer-Hodde House | | 1004 Williams St | | | |
| Vachel Lindsay Bridge | | Lake Springfield | 1933-1934 | | |
| Vachel Lindsay Home | | 603 S 5th St | 1848 | Greek Revival | November 11, 1971 |
| Virgil Hickox House | | 518 E Capitol Ave | c. 1839 | | March 5, 1982 |
| William Beedle House | | 411 S 8th St | 1840 | | |
| Witmer-Schuck Building | | 630 E Washington St | 1867 | | |
| Zimmerman Paint Store Building | | 417 E Adams St | c. 1860–1870 | | |

=== Historic Districts ===
==== National Historic Districts ====
- Central Springfield Historic District

== See also ==
- National Register of Historic Places listings in Sangamon County, Illinois

== Sources ==
- "State Historic Sites Springfield". Historic Springfield. March 14, 2024.
- Lincoln Financial Foundation Collection (1936). Illinois: Springfield. Historic buildings.
