= Dana–Thomas House =

Historic house in Illinois, United States

- Susan Lawrence Dana House
- U.S. National Register of Historic Places
- U.S. National Historic Landmark
- Illinois State Historic Site
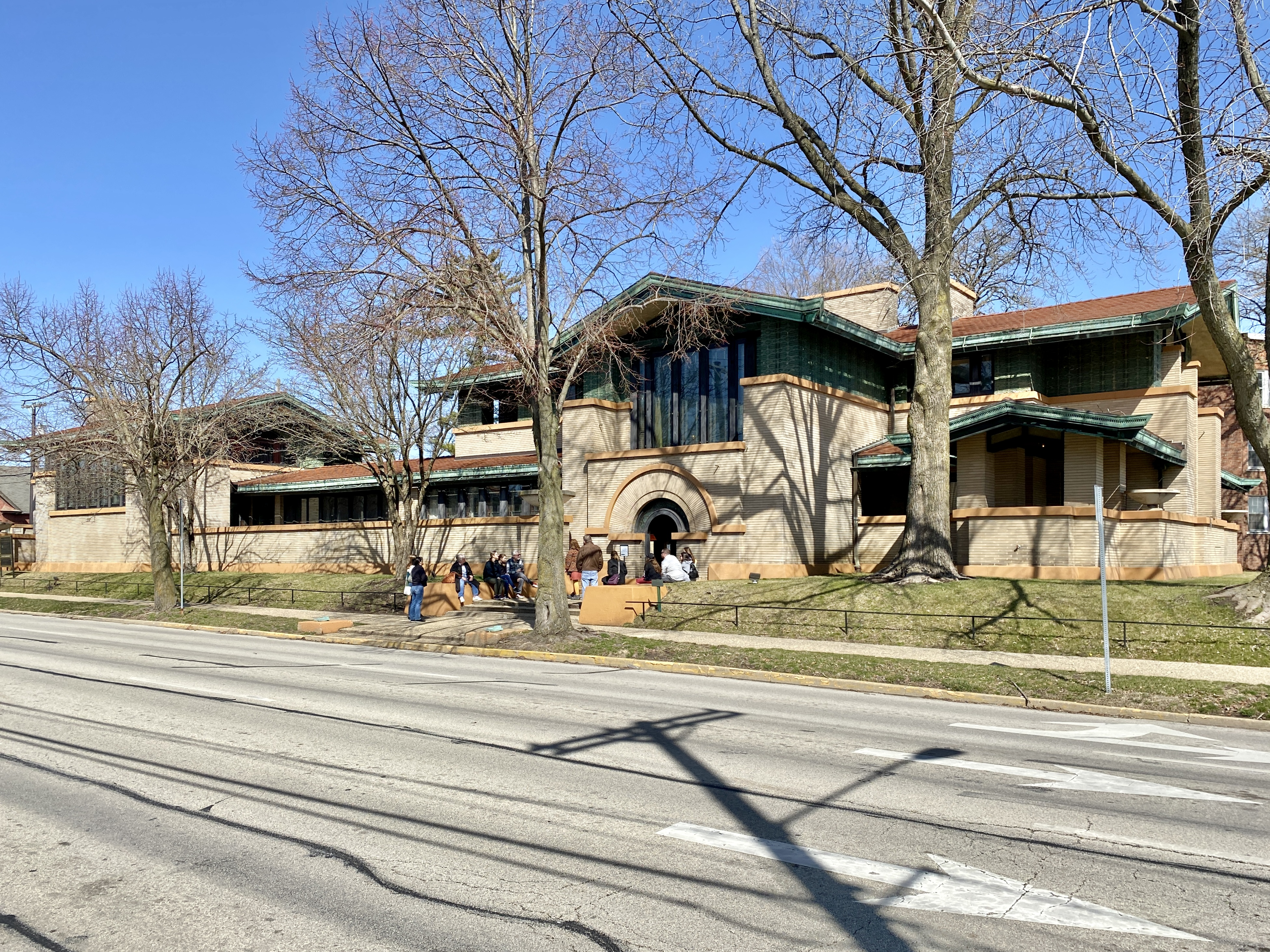
- Seen from Lawrence Avenue

- Location within Illinois Location within the United States
- Interactive map showing the Dana-Thomas House's location
- Location: 301 East Lawrence Avenue, Springfield, Illinois
- Coordinates: 39°47′39″N 89°39′5″W
- Area: 0.65 acres (0.26 ha)
- Built: 1902
- Architect: Frank Lloyd Wright
- NRHP reference No.: 74000774

Significant dates
- Added to NRHP: July 30, 1974
- Designated NHL: January 7, 1976

The Dana–Thomas House (also known as the Susan Lawrence Dana House or Dana House; formerly the Bannerstone House) is a Prairie style house at 301 East Lawrence Avenue in Springfield, Illinois, United States. Designed by architect Frank Lloyd Wright, it was built for the philanthropist Susan Lawrence Dana around an existing 1860s house. The main house to the east, at the intersection of Lawrence Avenue and Fourth Street, is connected with a library–gallery to the west. In addition to the main house, the estate includes a carriage house. The building is operated as a historic house museum by the Illinois Department of Natural Resources (IDNR). The Dana–Thomas House Foundation helps preserve the house, hosts events and programs, and raises funds.

The site was acquired in 1868 by Dana's father Rheuna Lawrence, who built a house there. After Dana's first husband and father both died in the early 1900s, she sought to renovate the existing house but was restricted by the terms of her father's will. Wright designed a new house around part of the existing house; work started in mid-1902 and was completed in December 1904. Dana initially hosted large gatherings and later religious meetings there, but as her finances dwindled, she moved out in 1928. The house was empty until 1944, when the Thomas Publishing Company and the Thomas family bought and renovated it. The Thomases made minimal changes to the structure, selling it to the state in 1981. The house became a state historic site under the Illinois Historic Preservation Agency (IHPA), which led a restoration effort in 1987–1990. The house was again renovated in 2011.

The house, one of Wright's first mansions, incorporated various elements from his other work, including floor plans and materials. Among its exterior features are 250 art glass windows and a gable roof. The house has a total floor area of 12,000 or 12,600 square feet (1,110 or 1,170 m^{2}); although the building is only three stories high, the rooms are split across 16 or 17 partial floor levels. A tall entry hall leads to a gallery, dining room, and living room at the first story. There are bedrooms on the second floor, along with a library and bowling alley in the basement.

The design has received praise over the years and has been depicted in media works such as the Wasmuth Portfolio. Objects from the house have been displayed at museums, and merchandise inspired by the house and its furniture has been sold. The house is designated as a National Historic Landmark, and the complex is a city and state historic site.

== Site ==
The Dana–Thomas House is located at 301 East Lawrence Avenue in Springfield, Illinois, at the northwest corner with South Fourth Street. It occupies a land lot measuring around 125 by 240 feet (38 by 73 m), which was formed through the combination of six smaller lots. The land lot also includes a library–gallery and a garage (or carriage house) west of the main house. The garage, at the western end of the site, abuts an alley that runs parallel to a railroad track. Both the railroad track and Lawrence Avenue are within 15 feet (4.6 m) of the house.

Historian Donald Hoffmann wrote that the house's architect, Frank Lloyd Wright, had wanted to "shape and define as much space as he could" with the landscape design. The original landscape design is poorly documented, but Walter Burley Griffin of Wright's studio may have been involved. The building sits on a berm several feet above the street. The house is surrounded by a brick wall, creating a walled garden around it. This wall extends around the carriage house. The garden itself contains colorful flower beds, trees, and flowering plants. Within the garden (just outside a secondary entrance to the house) is a pool; the garden is otherwise completely flat. Urns surround the building.

The avenue to the south was originally named Wright Street, before being named Douglas Avenue in 1890 and Lawrence Avenue in 1898. The avenue's name honors the Lawrence family, of which the house's original owner Susan Lawrence Dana was a member. Across Lawrence Avenue to the south is a two-story cottage where Dana lived in her later life. The house's parking lot is located across the railroad track from the house itself. There are also an apartment building immediately to the north and houses to the west and south. The Illinois Governor's Mansion is one block north. Other nearby buildings include the Illinois State Capitol three blocks north and Lincoln Home National Historic Site three blocks northeast.

=== Previous site use ===
The site was previously owned by lawyer and later US president Abraham Lincoln, who was active in real-estate speculation. D. E. Rucket built a house there c. 1854. The site then became the Lawrence House, variously cited as being designed in an Italianate or Victorian style. (Note: Multiple sources cite conflicting styles: Victorian; Italianate) The Lawrence House was built for Dana's father, businessman Rheuna D. Lawrence, who purchased the site in 1868. It was a brick structure with a hip roof topped by a cupola. The Lawrence House was nearly square in plan, measuring 30 feet (9.1 m) or 32 feet (9.8 m) wide and 34 feet (10 m) long. It was smaller than adjacent houses on 4th Street, including the Hay House immediately to the north (demolished 1934) and the Matteson House near the Governor's Mansion (destroyed 1873).

The Lawrence House was gradually expanded in the late 19th century. In 1893, a small frame cottage (later known as the White Cottage) was built for Susan and her first husband Edwin. By 1896, the estate included two annexes, along with a carriage house was to the northwest and the cottage at the western end. The Lawrence House occupied the remainder of the site. A stable and washhouse were added in 1900. When Wright rebuilt the Lawrence House, the cottage was moved across the railroad track, and a shed south of the cottage was removed. Concurrently, the stable and carriage house were redesigned with similar design details to the Dana House, along with a wall surrounding them.

== History ==
=== Development ===
From the 1850s onward, Rheuna Lawrence earned his fortune through the construction and mining sectors. Susan, the only one of Lawrence's children who survived to adulthood, married Edwin Dillingham Dana in 1883. The Danas' two children died in childhood, and Edwin himself died in 1900, followed by Lawrence in 1901. Lawrence left Susan a large inheritance; though the inheritance was estimated at about $3 million, the exact amount is unknown because Lawrence's will disappeared under mysterious circumstances. Lawrence's will prevented the existing house's demolition. The will also mandated that the Lawrence House site be used as Susan's main residence, although the existing building was allowed to be remodeled. Dana wanted to memorialize her father while showing off her wealth and hosting large events, and historian Donald Hoffmann wrote that Dana may have wanted to circumvent the will.

==== Wright commission and design ====
In 1902, Dana reached out to Frank Lloyd Wright. The circumstances of their first meeting are unknown, but historian Donald Hallmark suggests that Susan and Edwin Dana may have met one of Wright's aunts in Minneapolis in the 1880s. The Danas may also have met Wright in Oak Park, Illinois, in 1896 at a Daughters of the American Revolution chapter meeting. When Dana contacted him in 1902, Wright had had his own architectural practice for only nine years, and he designed buildings mostly in the Chicago metropolitan area. Dana had previously donated funds for the Hillside Home School II in Wright's hometown of Spring Green, Wisconsin.

Wright was ostensibly commissioned to plan the remodeling of the Lawrences' mansion, and his drawings were labeled as "alterations and additions" to the existing villa of Dana's mother. The commission was one of the largest awarded to Wright's Oak Park architectural studio in the early 1900s. Dana had originally planned to rebuild the house while preserving the foundation and parts of the old house's floor plan (including several rooms). The Wright studio essentially ended up rebuilding the entire house, constructing new rooms around the old house. Wright later wrote that Dana had wanted a home for entertaining and art—with a main house and gallery connected by a conservatory—as well as several double-height spaces. Unlike with the Coonley House or Darwin D. Martin House, he could not create an expansive interior because of both the small site and the restrictions of Lawrence's will.

Wright's early plans for the house were largely similar to the final plan, except for the configuration of the dining room and entry hall. The den (or sitting room) and living room were placed perpendicularly to the entry hall, and the dining room was a single-story room underneath the bedrooms, not readily visible from the entrance. The early plan also included a library and bowling alley; there was also a darkroom, although Dana's interest in photography is not documented. Hoffmann described the layout as an "egregious failing". Albert Van den Berghen, a draftsman at Wright's Oak Park studio, drew up plans for a statue inspired by the Alfred Tennyson poem "Flower in the Crannied Wall", only for Wright to ask Bock to redesign the sculptures. Wright considered Van den Berghen's plans an overly literal interpretation of the poem, and Van den Berghen is not known to have created another plan for Wright.

==== Construction ====
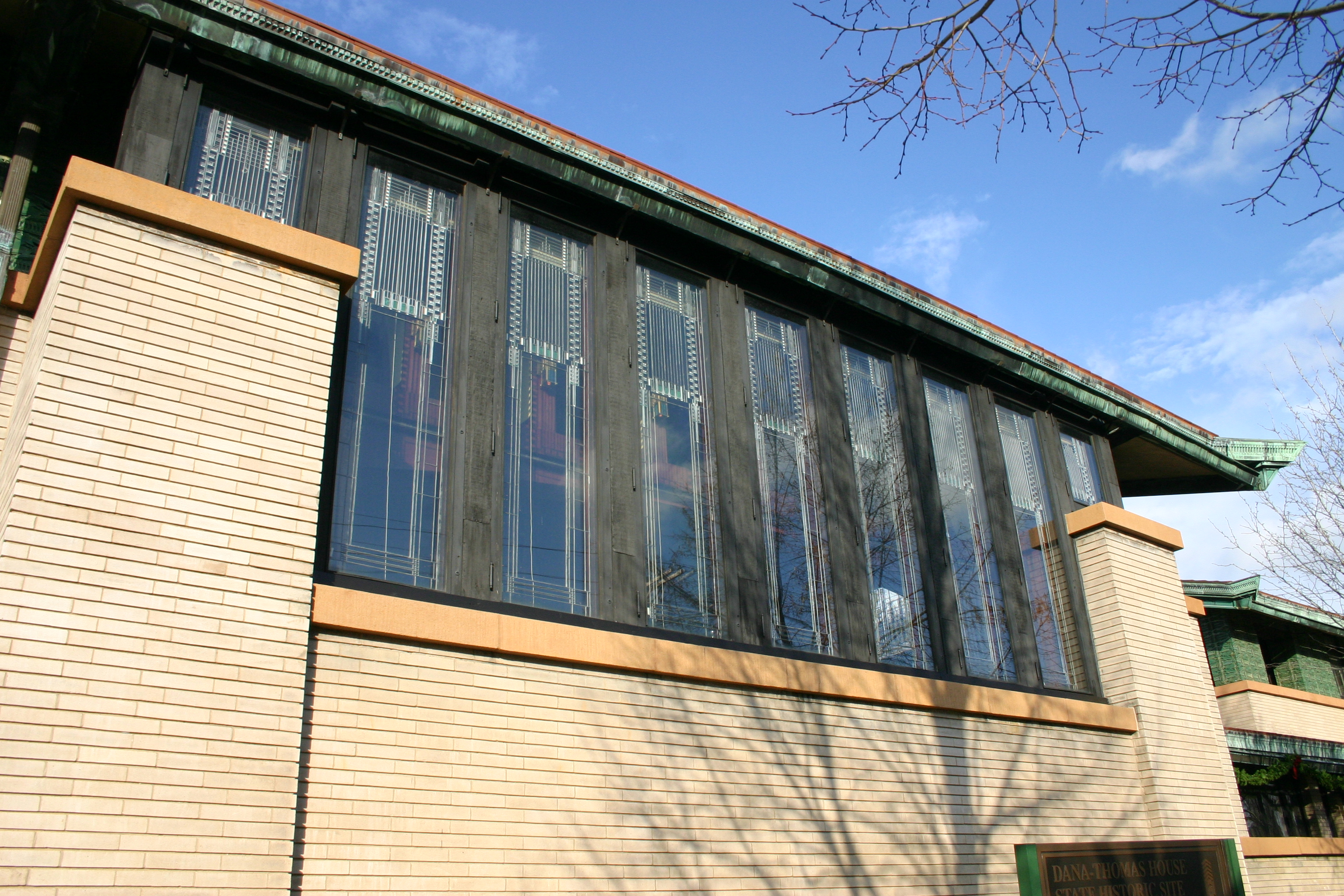
Exterior windows

Demolition of parts of the old house began in mid-1902, though Wright had not yet finalized his plans at that point, and news reports referred to the project as a renovation rather than new construction. Joseph M. Figueira, who oversaw the brickwork, may have been the house's general contractor. S. J. Hanes, who represented Wright on matters relating to the project, was married to the daughter of the judge who had administered Lawrence's will.

Wright's studio also refined the house's details, sketching them out in pencil. Dana quickly became enthusiastic about the design. By early 1903, Wright had revised his plans, which called for a larger house with pavilions at the corners, in addition to a bowling alley and a polygonal dining niche. Wright relocated the bedroom that had been above the dining room. Although the revised plan also included a tree in the building's porch (a detail that had been present in the original design), this tree was not ultimately included.

Although Dana monitored the house's expenses, she did not push back on any budget increases. As such, the building is sometimes cited as having had an unlimited budget. The project is estimated as having cost $60,000–125,000, (Note: Conflicting figures have been given: $60,000 (equivalent to $1,633,000 in 2024). This figure is also implied by one source that gives a figure of $45,000 for the construction and $15,000 for furnishings.; $120,000 (equivalent to $3,266,000 in 2024); $125,000 (equivalent to $3,402,000 in 2024)) and the furnishings alone cost $15,000; (Note: Equivalent to $408,000 in 2024) by contrast, the typical American house cost $4,000. (Note: Equivalent to $109,000 in 2024) The St. Louis Post-Dispatch wrote that "Wright was for the first time allowed to develop his ideas fully without staying within a budget", while Wright biographer Brendan Gill wrote that the unrestricted budget was "a danger to Wright as well as an opportunity". Wright later expressed some compunction about the cost overruns. Hallmark said the house's final cost may have included some expenses for the nearby Lawrence Memorial Library, which were not explicitly recorded. The rebuilt Dana House was his largest commission to date. Despite the extensive reconstruction, Wright still referred to the building as an "alteration—new facade for old house" a half-century after the building's completion.

=== Dana ownership ===
==== Early years ====
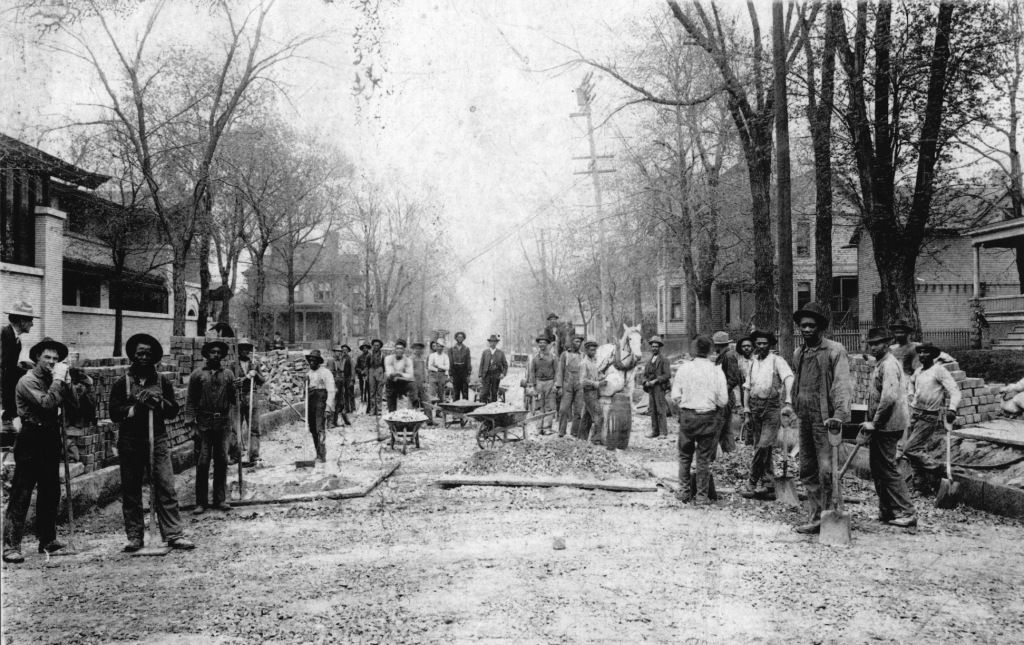
Lawrence Avenue being paved in 1905, shortly after the Dana House was built; the house is at left

Visitors began to tour the Dana House in October 1904, and the house was completed that December with a charity bazaar. Dana originally lived there with her cousin Florence Lawrence and mother Mary Agnes Lawrence, though Mary died soon after moving in. Dana, who had become fascinated with spiritualism and the occult during the building's construction, began trying to communicate with her late husband and parents soon after she moved in. She also owned three carriages, which were stored at the carriage house. Dana employed several servants, including a chef, maid, and carriage driver.

From the start, Dana entertained guests at the house and hosted Christmas celebrations. The house became a popular meeting place for social events and for politicians working in the nearby Illinois State Capitol. Fundraisers and parties were common occurrences, especially prior to 1912. Dana threw a party for over 1,000 people in 1906, and social reformer Jane Addams also hosted a reception there in 1909. Other events included a reception honoring conductor John Philip Sousa, along with poetry readings by writer Carl Sandburg.

In 1912, Dana remarried to Lawrence Joergen-Dahl, a singer in his mid-20s. (Note: Sources disagree on whether Joergen-Dahl was 25 or 26 years old when they married.) Although Dana was 49, she still thought she was capable of having children with Joergen-Dahl, even constructing a nursery at the house. Joergen-Dahl died in 1913, and Dana was married to her third husband, Charles A. Gehrmann, from 1915 to 1920; neither man bore Dana any children. Dana became increasingly reclusive over time and turned her attention to spiritualism. By the 1920s, the house was used mostly for meetings, and Dana had established a group there to teach people about spiritualism. (Note: Various names have been given for the group Dana established: Lawrence Center of Constructive Thinking; Lawrence Center for Constructive Thought; Lawrence Metaphysical Center) The house's library was filled with books on spiritualism. Dana's extravagant spending habits and a series of poor investments depleted her remaining fortune.

==== Dana's move out ====
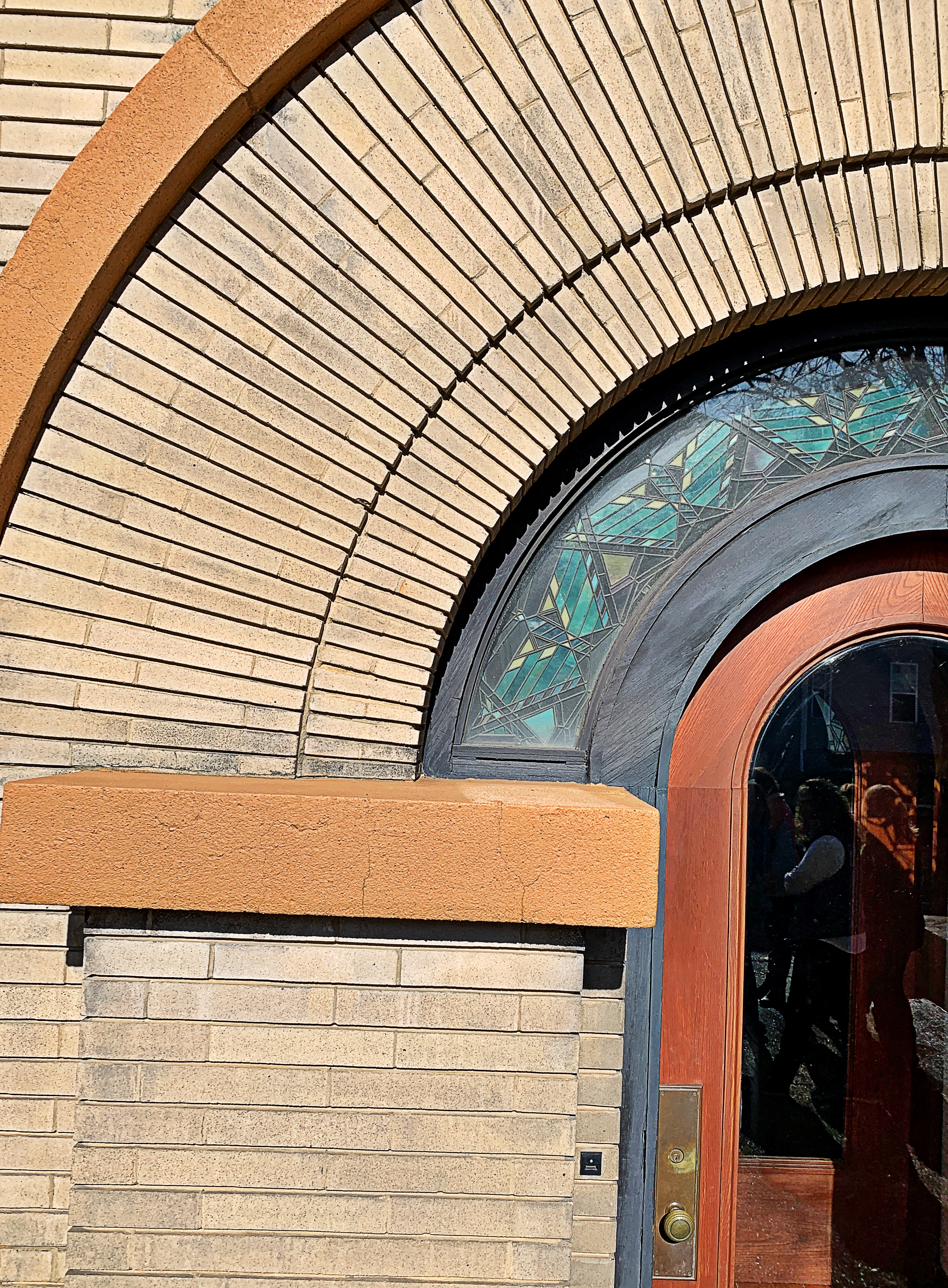
Detail of entrance arch

Florence died in 1928, and Dana closed the Dana House around that time. She moved to the cottage across the street, and the Dana House remained empty from the late 1930s until 1944. In her later life Dana struggled with age-related dementia, and she gained a reputation as the quirky "Aunt Susie". In correspondence with others, Dana continued to claim the Dana House as her address, even though people knew she did not actually live there. Dana could not afford to maintain the house, which deteriorated over the years due to vibrations and sulfur emissions from passing trains, and which began to see infestations of pigeons.

The original Dana House retained objects such as dozens of scarves, handbags, fans, and tapestries. The items were auctioned off in 1943, in an auction lasting five or six days. Many observers came to see the objects, which included china, sculpture, paintings, and a $24,000 Tiffany necklace. (Note: Equivalent to $347,000 in 2024) Conversely, there was relatively little demand for Wright's designs, amid growing interest in other types of modern architecture. Some of the objects received bids for less than $1, (Note: Equivalent to $19 in 2025) such as chairs that had originally cost $7–18 each. (Note: Equivalent to $130–335 in 2025) Architectural writer Blair Kamin wrote that an appraiser had rated the house's value as zero. Appraiser John W. Bice concluded that the house and site were worth $13,175, (Note: Equivalent to $190,000 in 2024) but could be sold to an organization for as much as $20,000. (Note: Equivalent to $289,000 in 2024) Dana died in 1946, having expended most of her fortune.

=== Thomas ownership ===
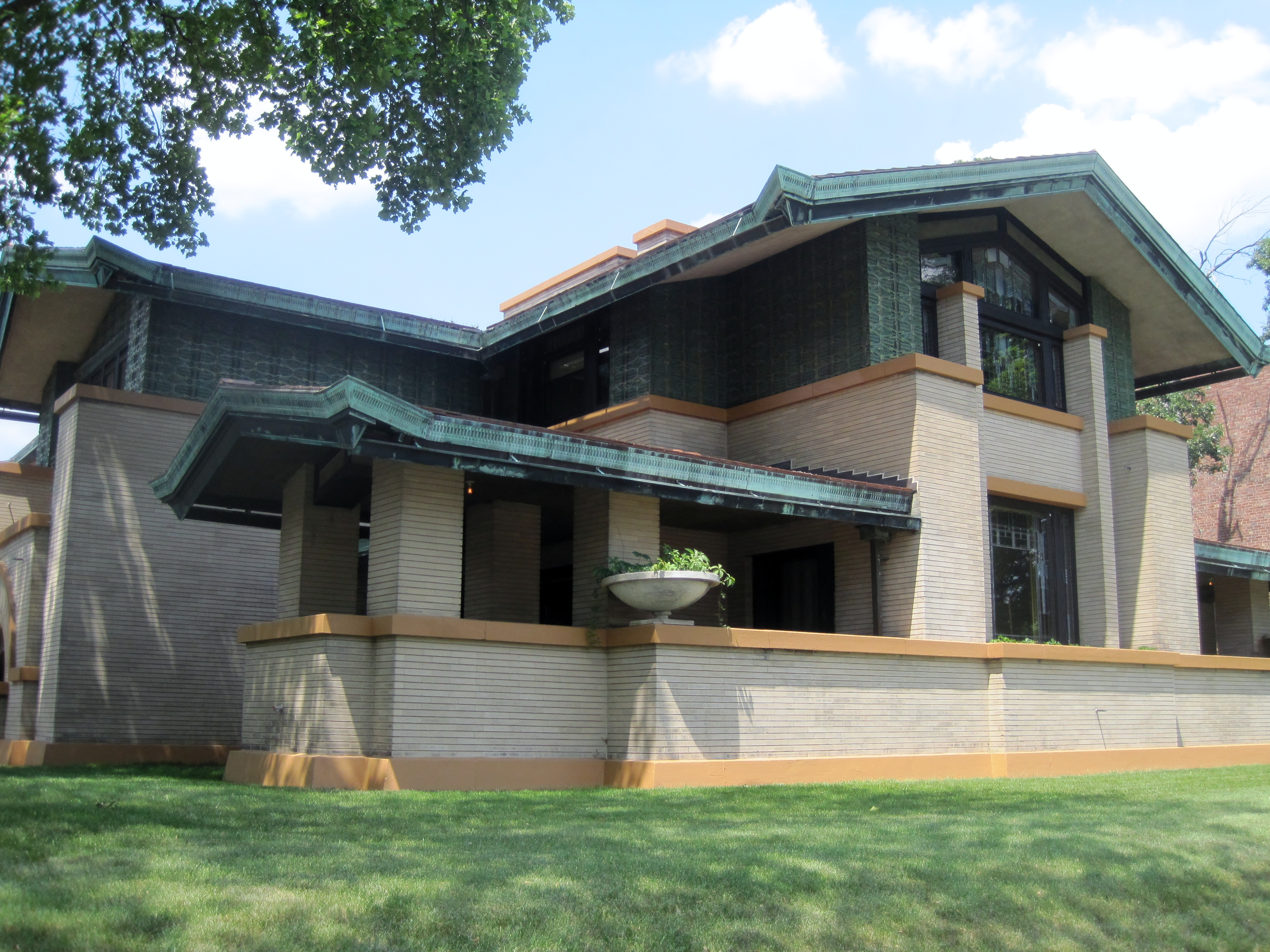
The Fourth Street (eastern) elevation

The next owner was the Charles C. Thomas Publishing Company, a medical publishing firm operated by Charles and Nanette Thomas. In August 1943, Charles Thomas announced his intention to buy the Dana House. At the time, many houses in the area were being sold off for development. The Thomases are cited as having paid $12,250; (Note: Equivalent to $173,000 in 2024) (Note: Other sources give a different value of $17,000 (equivalent to $240,000 in 2024).) this consisted of a $1,000 down payment and a $11,250 mortgage. (Note: The down payment is equivalent to $14,000, and the mortgage equivalent to $159,000, in 2024) Thomas said that "extensive repairs might be necessary", and historian Thomas Heinz wrote that the joints had weakened so significantly that they could be opened with a knife. The Thomas family repaired the house, installed a boiler, added air-conditioning and lighting fixtures, and modified some of the decorations. Some bricks from a collapsed wall were used to build a chimney. Wright suggested to Thomas that the wood be stained to hide the damage caused by pigeons.

The mortgage was paid off within a year, and the Thomas Company moved into the house in April or August 1944. The Thomas Company used the building as offices for several decades. The company called the building the Bannerstone House, although it was also called the Dana House. Secretarial and administrative offices occupied the basement, first floor, and garage, while the upper stories became executive offices. The original furnishings were kept in place, and Nanette Thomas recalled giving tours to new employees where she directed them not to touch the furniture.

The family's Thomas Foundation took over the house in 1946. The next year, Thomas suggested to Wright that the eastern elevation's porches could be enclosed, but Wright rejected the idea. When the Thomas Foundation ceased to exist in 1956, the Thomases' son Payne and Thomas Company employee Wayne Bolinger took over ownership. Over time, the house fell into disrepair, and local children shot BB guns at it. Charles Thomas retained the house until his death in 1968; Nanette then continued to own it.

Later observers credited the couple and the Thomas Company with preserving the house's original furnishings and design, in part by not making any permanent changes to the design. For example, the Thomas Company had stained the wood without varnishing it, and the air-conditioning and lighting systems it had installed were designed to be easily removed. The company had also saved parts of the frieze, which had fallen off and been replaced with plywood. Any alterations the Thomases made were minimal; for example, when the original red-tile roof had to be replaced, the Thomases spent large sums to replicate the roof design. One University of Illinois Springfield architecture professor, whose class studied the house in 1981, said it was the best-preserved Wright-designed house. Nonetheless, parts of the house were in disrepair: The bowling alley had been cut into tabletops, the garden had lost its pond, and the porches were surrounded by chain-link fences.

=== Illinois historic site ===
==== Early and mid-1980s: Acquisition and early years ====
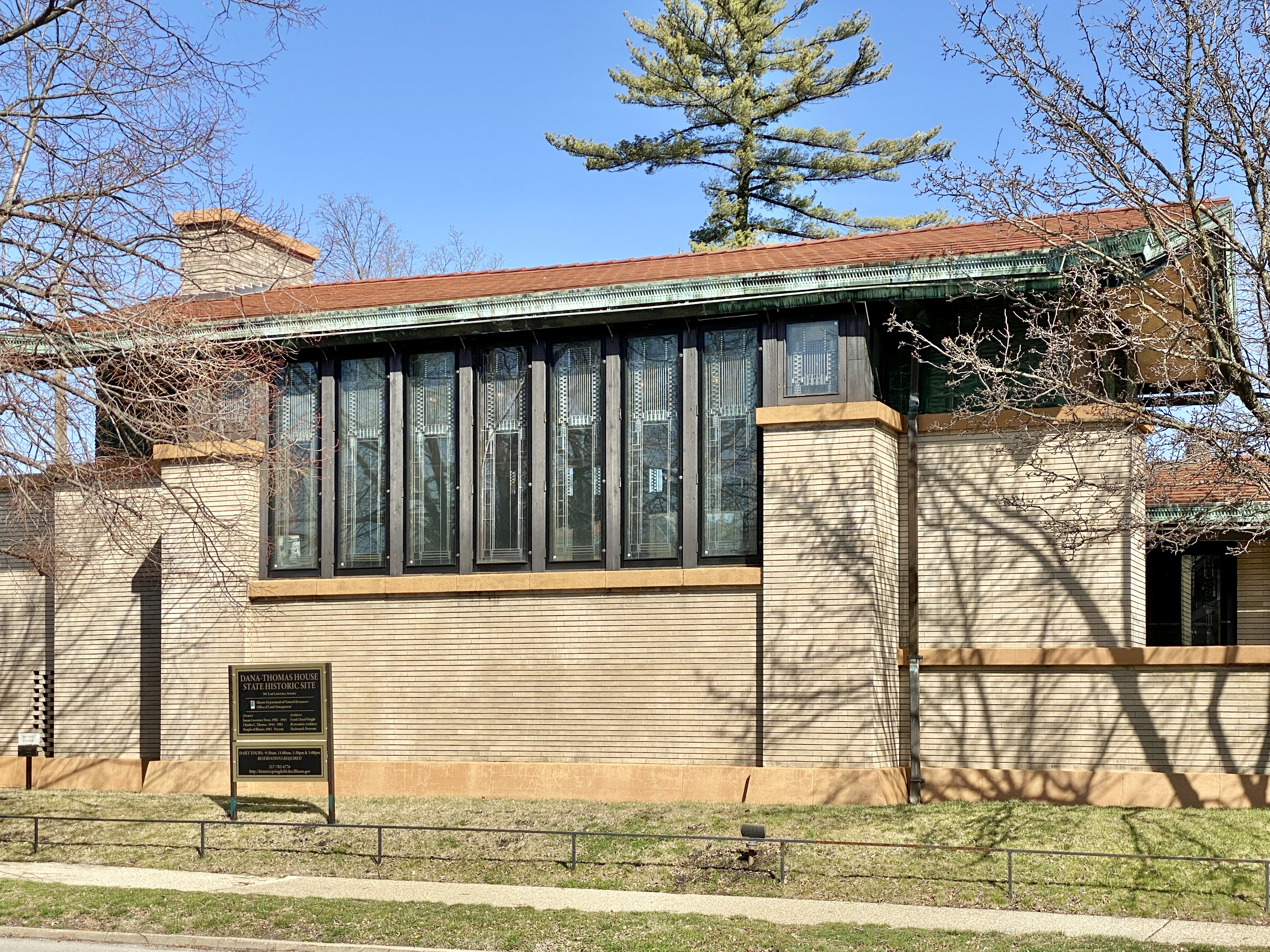
View of the conservatory connecting the main house and gallery–library

The Illinois Senate proposed buying the house for $1 million in 1981; (Note: Equivalent to $2.9 million in 2024) the Thomas Publishing Company agreed on the condition that it remained intact. At the time, there were competing bids to acquire the house at a much higher price and dismantle it for scrap; four of the chandeliers had been valued at more than the state's offer for the entire house. Despite the state government's budget shortfalls, legislators proposed using bond revenues to buy the house, citing a wish to see it preserved. After both chambers of the Illinois General Assembly approved legislation to buy the house, Governor James R. Thompson signed the legislation that July. Unlike other state historic sites, the Dana House had been acquired mainly for its architecture. The state appointed Donald Hallmark as the house's first superintendent.

The house, renamed the Dana–Thomas House after its two previous owners, was partially restored before its opening. It opened for a public viewing in December 1981, which attracted thousands of visitors. The house formally opened as a museum on July 1, 1982, and recorded 20,000 visitors over the rest of the year. When the museum opened, it was operated by the Illinois Historic Preservation Agency (IHPA). Although the house was in good shape, it had sustained weather-related damage, the woodwork had been damaged, and the interior color scheme had washed away. The state lacked $150,000 even to create a master plan for the house, (Note: Equivalent to $411,000 in 2024) let alone a full renovation, which was expected to cost $5.5 million. (Note: Equivalent to $16.0 million in 2024)

The museum recorded 35,000 visitors in its first full year, 1983. Hallmark recalled that, since he lived nearby, people would often call him after hours to ask him to open the house. By September 1983, the state had landscaped the exterior; this involved removing a chain-link fence and planting trees. The state also allocated $100,000 for a master plan, (Note: Equivalent to $274,000 in 2024) and it began upgrading mechanical systems and restoring the decorations in phases as funding became available. That year, the Dana–Thomas House Foundation was created to assist with the restoration process. Thompson proposed allocating $1.3 million for renovations in 1985. (Note: Equivalent to $3.7 million in 2024) By the next year, the house had 55,000 annual visitors; it had become one of the most popular Wright-designed buildings, behind Fallingwater and the Frank Lloyd Wright Home and Studio.

==== Late 1980s renovation ====
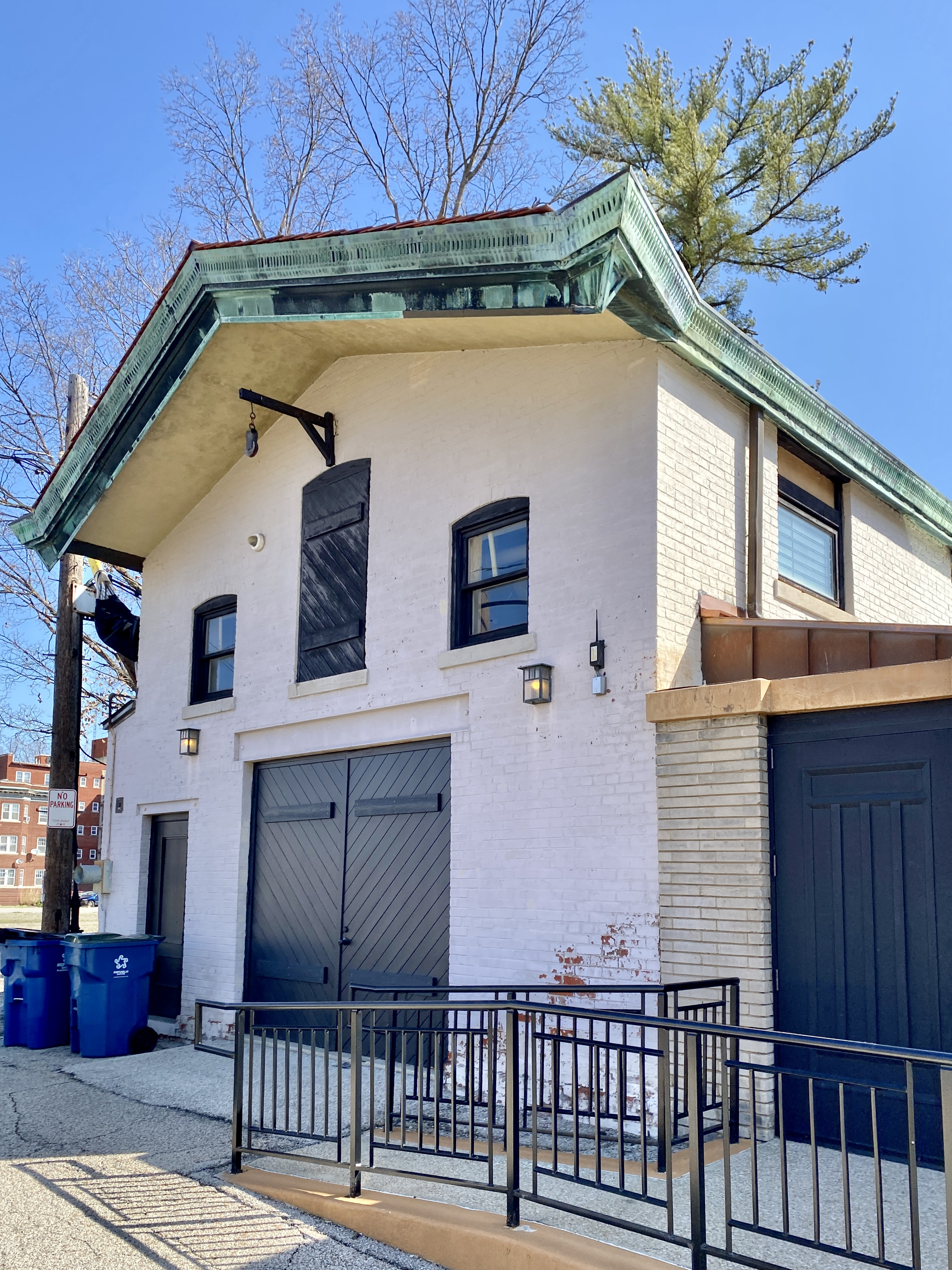
The carriage house, which was converted to a visitor center in the late-1980s renovation

The General Assembly provided $1.4 million for renovations in 1986. (Note: Equivalent to $3.3 million in 2024) Hasbrouck Peterson Associates, which had created the house's master plan, was hired as the restoration architect. Hasbrouck Peterson recommended restoring the house to its appearance in 1910, when the house had been complete for some time. The house closed in July 1987 for rehabilitation. The first phase of renovations involved mechanical repairs, which included new or upgraded temperature-control, lighting, security, and electrical systems. The carriage house's interiors were gutted. The neighboring Dana cottage was converted into a gift shop and visitor center while the main house was closed. The same year, the state and the Dana–Thomas House Foundation began raising money to re-acquire some of the house's original furniture at auction, and 160 private donors raised hundreds of thousands of dollars. The state bought six items that December.

The exterior and interior renovations were delayed pending funding allocations. The mechanical upgrades were completed in 1988, and that year, the IHPA acquired an adjacent site for off-street parking. The exterior and interior renovations were budgeted at $1.6 million (Note: Equivalent to $3.7 million in 2024) and funded by the General Assembly's 1988 budget. Thompson also lent $42,000 from his gubernatorial campaigns for the renovation. (Note: Equivalent to $96,000 in 2024) The next two phases took place simultaneously between 1989 and 1990. Workers repaired the drainage systems, porch, and roof; converted the carriage house to a visitor center; and refurbished the basement as part of the second phase. The interior and exterior were concurrently renovated in the third phase.

The second and third phases included repairing concrete, repointing bricks, and restoring plaster. The original furnishings were also restored; one of the house's employees, Bob Maisenbacher, repaired the furniture in secret because the state did not want the furniture cost to be disclosed. Restoration workers examined woodwork and paint chips, interviewed two of Dana's former maids, and studied old photographs of the house. A local group re-created the house's original linens. The work also involved more landscaping changes and acquiring furnishings that had been sold off. The 1980s renovation did not involve roof replacement. Overall, the renovation had taken three years and cost $5 million. (Note: Equivalent to $10.6 million in 2024) The Dana–Thomas House reopened in September 1990 with a ten-day-long celebration, and the gift shop was moved to the carriage house. The architectural critic Blair Kamin wrote that the house's restoration may have been influenced by its proximity to the Illinois Governor's Mansion.

==== 1990s and 2000s ====
After reopening, the house received 100,000 visitors in its first ten months, a similar visitation rate to Fallingwater and the Wright Home and Studio. Though the house had 150 volunteer guides, the number of paid employees was reduced from eight to six. Due to budgetary shortfalls, in 1992, the state proposed closing the house completely before deciding to keep it open for limited hours, The Dana–Thomas House Foundation suggested that an admission fee be charged to fund the house's operations, and Governor Jim Edgar proposed implementing suggested donations. Guides began soliciting donations in April 1993, and regular hours resumed that September. The success of the donation program led the state to approve a pilot program implementing an admission fee for three years, which went into effect in April 1994. Despite initial concerns, the admission fee did not cause tourism to decline, as Wright fans were already accustomed to paying admission fees. The house underwent accessibility upgrades in 1994–1995, which cost $13,828. (Note: Equivalent to $24,000 in 2024)

During the 1990s, the state spent another $1 million on upgrades, (Note: Equivalent to $1.8 million in 2024) and it continued to buy back some of the house's decorations. The Dana–Thomas House Foundation and IHPA had acquired almost all the remaining major pieces of original furniture by 1998. A series of upgrades began that year, costing $770,000 and lasting through 2002. Among these were repairs to the facade and roof, for which the state allocated $316,000 in 1999. (Note: Equivalent to $558,000 in 2024) The IHPA also requested funds for emergency repairs to the garden's southern wall, which was in danger of collapsing; that wall was shored up with wooden bracing, and repairs began that October. An upgrade of the climate-control system began in 2001, but the project subsequently stalled for nearly five years because of funding shortfalls. By the mid-2000s, the house had five full-time staff and 120 volunteers, and it was recording 23,000 annual visitors. At the time, volunteers hosted about 3,650 tours a year.

The state allocated $3.1 million in 2007 to repair the house and complete upgrades to the climate-control system. The upgrades included repairing windows and doors, as well as adding security systems and a wheelchair lift. The next year, the state government proposed closing the house due to budgetary shortfalls; this required furloughing all of the house's employees except Hallmark, its superintendent. The house was closed in December 2008, and Hallmark maintained the house during the closure. The closure led to declines in the neighborhood's foot traffic and prompted a myriad of visitor queries. After the house reopened in April 2009, the museum saw slight attendance increases compared with before the closure. Though all the house's previous employees were rehired, Hallmark retired soon after the museum reopened, having worked there for nearly three decades.

==== 2010s to present ====
In 2010, the Dana–Thomas House Foundation demolished a nearby two-story house at 227 East Lawrence Avenue (across the railroad track) to provide space for tour bus parking; previously, tour buses sometimes let passengers out onto oncoming traffic. That year, amid proposals to convert the railroad track into a high-speed rail line, preservationists expressed concerns that trains would cause excessive vibrations. The state government also announced plans that December for a $2.5 million renovation, which involved accessibility, utility, climate control, and exterior upgrades. The Dana–Thomas House was closed in January 2011, and the items were stored away for safekeeping. The project was postponed because of a lack of bids; although the house remained closed for eleven months, only half that time was spent on actual restoration. The house reopened that December.

The Dana–Thomas House was temporarily closed after being damaged by floods in 2014. That year, a butterfly garden opened at the cottage adjoining the house. The house's operating hours were also reduced to five days a week, then four, in the mid-2010s because of state budget cuts; it resumed seven-day operations in 2016. By then, the Dana–Thomas House collected more donations than any other state historic site in Illinois except the Galena Historic Sites. The State Journal-Register attributed the high donation figures to the lack of self-guided tours. After the YMCA proposed demolishing its adjacent building in 2018, the city government considered giving the site to the Dana–Thomas House Foundation. During the COVID-19 pandemic in Illinois, in-person tours were temporarily suspended; the IDNR began operating virtual tours of the house in 2021, and holiday tours resumed that year. Also in 2021, the Daughters of the American Revolution provided $25,000 for the renovation of the site's cottage into a library and education center.

During a temporary closure of the Illinois State Museum in 2024, the Dana–Thomas House hosted some of that museum's exhibits. In 2025, the state government allocated $6.6 million for roof repairs, security upgrades, and water mitigation. The state government separately allocated $750,000 to repair the cottage. That year, the Dana–Thomas House Foundation donated $48,874 to the Illinois Conservation Foundation for the restoration of the carpets.

== Architecture ==
The Dana–Thomas House was designed in the Prairie style by Frank Lloyd Wright and is Wright's only house design in Springfield. It was one of six major residential commissions Wright executed in the 1900s, along with the Coonley, Little, Martin, Robie, and Willits houses. Wright collaborated with numerous contractors, as well as employees of his own studio such as Richard Bock and George Niedecken, in the design. As with much of his previous work, Wright was responsible for all aspects of the overall design, creating what historian Lisa Schrenk called a gesamtkunstwerk or "total artwork". When the house opened for tours, sources called the Dana–Thomas House one of the most intact Wright designs.

As one of Wright's first mansions, the Dana–Thomas House was completed before Wright had finalized the characteristics of the Prairie style. Brendan Gill wrote that the house did not relate to the prairie "either physically or emotionally". It also incorporates elements of Japanese styles, which Wright and Dana both liked. The house has similarities with some of Wright's other designs; for instance, the southern elevation of the facade is nearly identical to one facade of the Hillside Home School II, and the furnishings and windows are similar to those in the Francis W. Little House I. The interior layout, which required visitors to zigzag to reach the rooms, is similar to Wright's earlier George Blossom House. Wright had previously used some of the materials and design details—such as the pinwheel floor plan, friezes, and Roman brick—on earlier projects. The general plan was based on "A House in a Prairie Town", a design Wright had submitted for Ladies' Home Journal magazine in 1900.

Very little remains of the original Lawrence House; although parts of the older house's general plan remain intact, the rooms have been enlarged significantly. As such, historian Robert McCarter wrote that scholars had assumed the older house had been destroyed. Wright had previous experience designing a house around another, having built the Peter A. Beachy House around an older house in Oak Park.

=== Exterior ===
==== Form ====
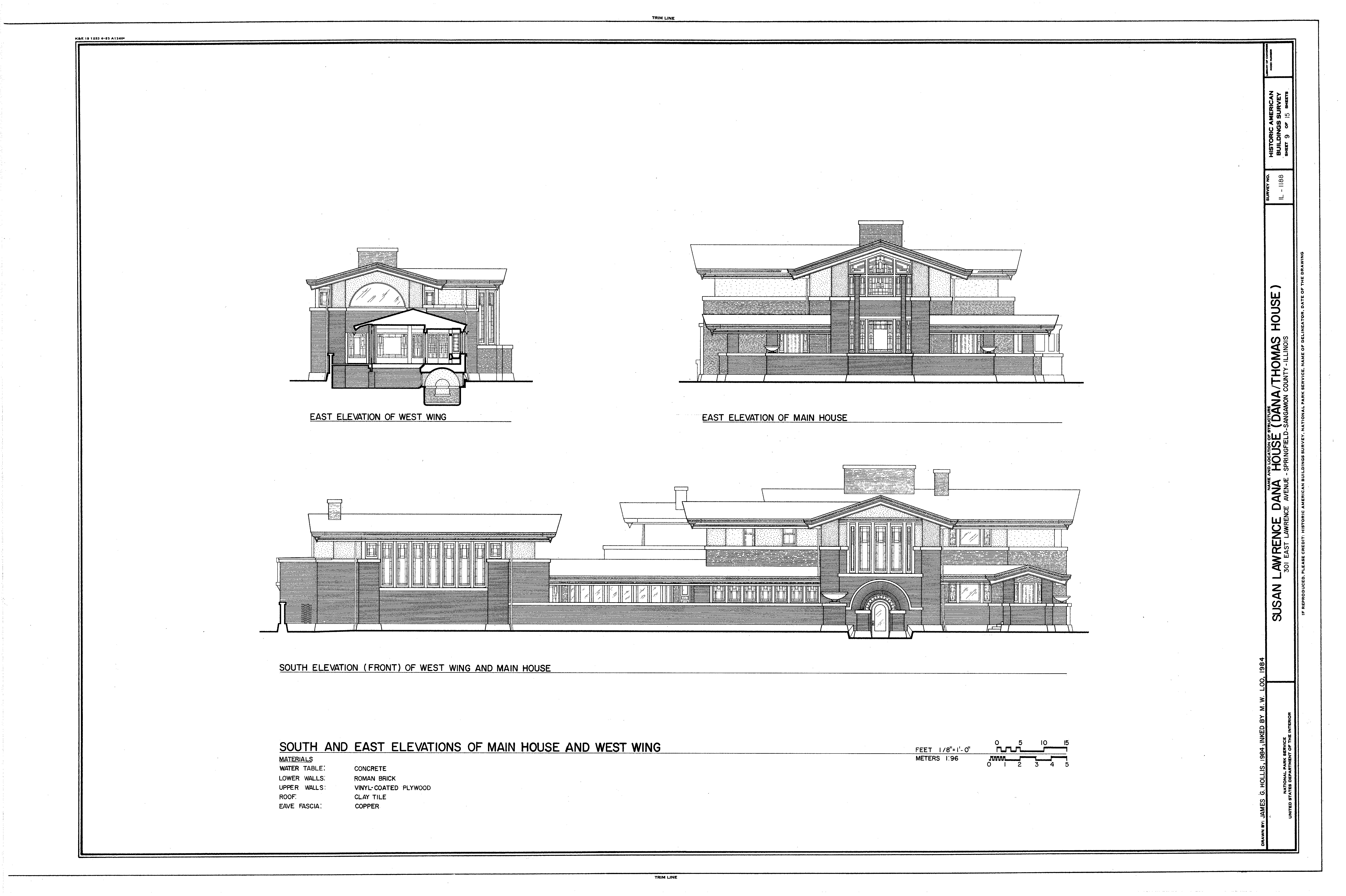
Southern and eastern elevation drawings

The building consists of a main house to the east and a gallery–library structure to the west, connected by a corridor. The reason for the gallery–library's separation from the rest of the house is unclear. Wright had previously built library pavilions for the Frederick Bagley House and his own studio, and he had also used pavilions in the Hillside Home School. His draftsman Marion Mahony had also drawn up plans for a standalone library pavilion in her master's thesis at the Massachusetts Institute of Technology. Despite the house's urban location, Wright thought a larger building would make its occupant's life "broadened, made more free because of sympathetic freedom of plan and structure".

At the north end of the main house, a breakfast alcove extends 15 feet (4.6 m) from the northern elevation, curving outward from the dining room in an apse-like manner. A kitchen wing extends west. Unusually for a Prairie house designed by Wright, the building has overhanging gable roofs, which have shallow pitches. The roofs are covered with red tile, with gutters that flare upward; Hoffmann likened the roof design to a Chinese handscroll.

==== Facade ====
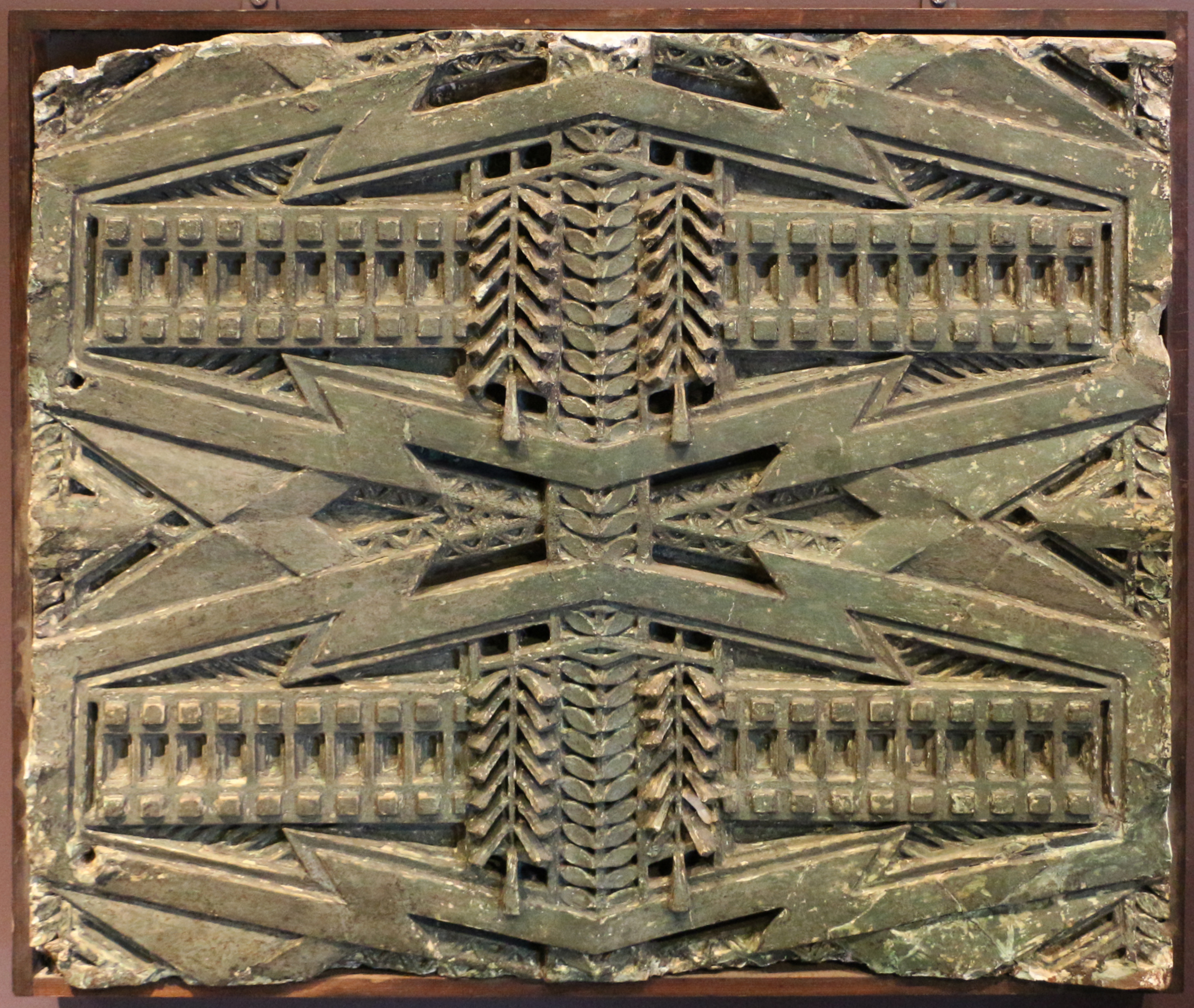
Exterior detail

The foundation is made of yellow limestone. Above, the facade has buff or creamy gray-colored brick, with horizontal joints that were originally deeply recessed to create shadows between the bricks. Subsequent modifications filled in the joints, making them flush with the bricks. The bricks themselves were laid with their header faces measuring 2 inches (51 mm) tall and 12 inches (300 mm) wide, creating a horizontal emphasis. Wright perceived the bricks as a good material with which different architectural details could be articulated (or expressed), comparing the use of brick to Johann Sebastian Bach's music. Throughout the facade, he juxtaposed short masonry abutments and vertical piers to create patterns. The horizontal belt courses and copings, manufactured of cast stone, were cast with precision to give the impression of cut stone.

Wright also designed about 250 stained glass windows (which he called art glass), manufactured by Linden Art Glass. These windows generally have a sumac motif, although a variety of designs are used. During late afternoons and evenings, sunlight passes directly through the windows, casting color inside. Hoffmann wrote that the art glass designs were intended to counteract the lack of natural features outside the house, saying that in general, "Wright's glass patterns become more intricate if the outdoor features lack charm".

The main entrance is through a Romanesque arch on Lawrence Avenue, directly beneath one of the roof gables. An oversized urn is placed in front of the main entrance, and there are art glass windows above the door, depicting a butterfly motif. Another entrance is through the house's garden, where a wide staircase ascends to a set of doors. In contrast to Wright's generally asymmetrical designs, the eastern elevation is symmetrical, with discontinuous porches at the north and south ends. This elevation contains tower-like pavilions for the bedrooms, which are topped by gables. The other elevations are not symmetrical, and the rear elevations (facing the garden) have windows in what Thomas Heinz described as "unrefined locations". Within the main house, the northern elevation of the breakfast alcove is topped by a cantilevered gable, and the kitchen wing has a terrace for servants. The gallery's western elevation has a protruding bay supported by corbels.

The second story contains deep brown terracotta decorations with geometric designs. The top of the facade has a plaster frieze, one of four in a Wright-designed house. (Note: The Heller, Husser, and Winslow houses also have plaster friezes, while the Coonley and Irving houses have ceramic friezes.) Wright had considered constructing the frieze out of cast metal or bronze before deciding on plaster. The frieze depicts an angular motif, a precursor to a common motif later used in Art Deco buildings. The piers are arranged in pairs and terminate under the roofline, creating the impression that the roof hovers above the piers.

=== Interior ===
The house has a total floor area of 12,000 square feet (1,100 m^{2}) or 12,600 square feet (1,170 m^{2}). Although the house is physically three stories high, the interiors are split into 16 or 17 partial floor levels. The interior is cited as having 35 or 41 rooms; (Note: The Springfield News-Leader gives a figure of 16 communal rooms for visitors, as well as 25 small and large rooms for the residents.) the boundaries between some rooms are not clearly delineated, as was the case with other houses. The spaces were arranged to allow gatherings with hundreds of people. Rather than constructing corridors with rooms leading off them, Wright placed multiple doors or doorways in each room, connecting the spaces directly in an enfilade configuration. Smaller spaces, with ceilings just above the height of the average person, lead to other rooms with high ceilings. This succession of rooms created a sense of "expanding space" and was intended to encourage chance interactions.

Wright's studio was extensively involved in creating the interior detail; for instance, Niedecken created many of the decorations, while another Wright draftsman, Walter Burley Griffin, designed a light sconce for the house. Decorations depicting butterflies, sumac, and other prairie flora were used throughout. Plaster walls were given a textured finish and painted in earth tones ranging from orange to green. Stained wood was used inside as well, but it was damaged by air pollution over the years; it was restored to its original red in 1990. Art glass panes created by Linden Art Glass were used extensively inside; the arrangement of the art glass panels, along with the exterior windows, creates sightlines throughout the various rooms. The house includes two rooms with barrel-vaulted ceilings, one of the last times Wright designed barrel vaults.

The house was among the first in Springfield to be equipped with electricity. The original mechanical features also included an icebox and an annunciator panel connected with seven doorbells. The house has retractable fire alarms, which are set into the wall surface and painted to match the wall colors. The basement has mechanical equipment. Wright, anticipating the future need to install utilities, incorporated crawl spaces throughout the house. When the house was renovated in the 1990s, the mechanical equipment was placed in existing closets and ducts or hidden behind grilles.

==== Reception spaces ====
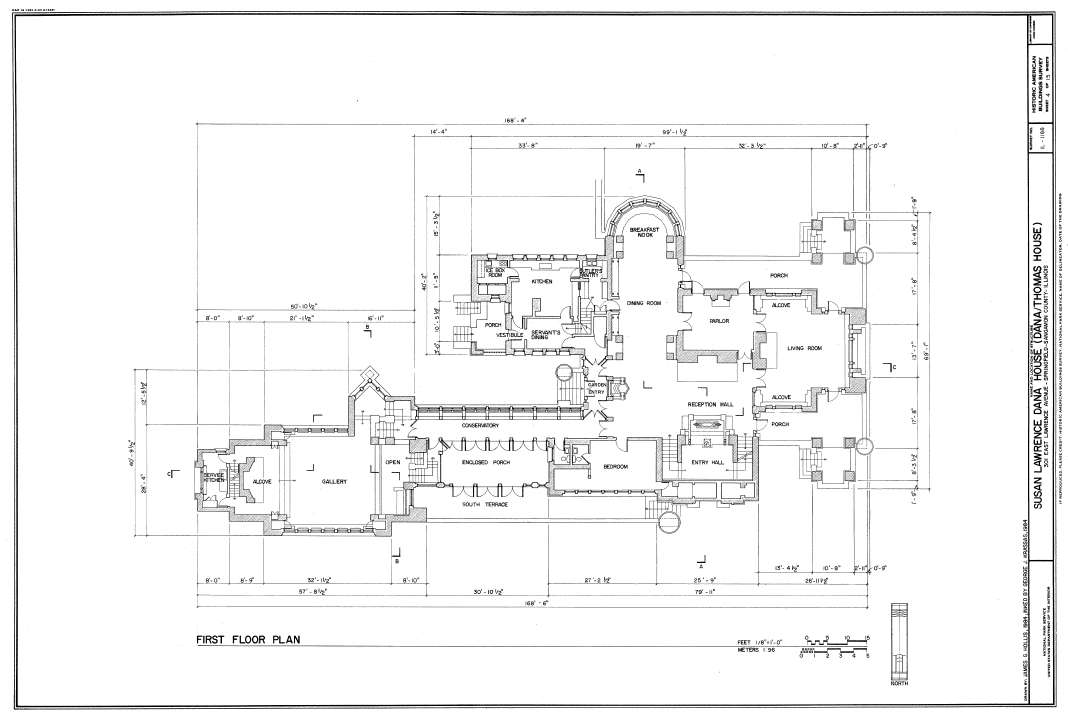
First-floor plan for the Dana–Thomas House

The front door leads to a small vestibule, which measures 4.5 feet (1.4 m) deep and leads to an inner set of doors; the vestibule is flanked by low closets and has a barrel-vaulted ceiling. Past the inner doors is the triple-story entry hall, slightly below street level. The entry hall's walls have slender bricks and horizontal oak strips. Furnishings such as armchairs, casework, an urn, and a pedestal-mounted lamp continued the entry hall's interior design. The entry hall has coatroom shelves and lighting sconces. The bathroom, vault, and niche are also on the entry hall's lower level. These spaces, along with the coatroom, had originally been located on the Lawrence House's first floor, but Wright had considered them an "ugly island of obstructions". Protruding into the entry hall are balconies, which connect with the second story. The upper sections of the walls are painted in an autumnal color scheme of greens and browns.

The entry hall has a life-size terracotta sculpture, designed by Wright and Bock and executed by Gates Potteries. It is known as The Flower in the Crannied Wall and inspired by Alfred Tennyson's poem of the same name. It depicts a female figure above a pyramidal structure, sculpted from casts of a nude model at Wright's studio. Historian Vincent Scully said this sculpture represented Wright's ideal that a family be "an absolute partnership of husband and wife who together shaped a place with the children", while Hoffmann and Heinz both regarded it as an allegory of the similarities between architecture and natural life. Short flights of stairs flank the sculpture, creating an indirect circulation pattern that writer Lisa Schrenk described as a "path of discovery" for visitors. The stair to the left (west) ascends to the reception hall, while the stair to the right (east) descends to the lower level.

The first floor is a half-story above the entrance hall's lower level. The reception hall's north wall contains an arched fireplace, directly behind The Flower in the Crannied Wall and facing the arched entryway. In front of the fireplace is an inglenook with seats and gray tiles. Other rooms radiate off the reception hall. The arrangement is similar to some of Wright's other designs, where rooms extend off a central fireplace, although the rooms are off-axis from the entry hall, requiring visitors to turn. Continuing from the reception-hall level, stairs ascend to the balconies on the second floor. The balcony directly above the reception hall has a brick wall with a piano. There is also a wooden-slatted screen, behind which is an electric pump organ.

==== Other first-story spaces ====
West of the reception hall is a geometric fountain known as The Moon Children, within a reception room just south of the dining room. This fountain, with nude figures designed by Mahony and sculpted by Bock, is non-operational because it lacks a water-circulation system. Drapes are installed between a pair of brick piers north of the fountain, separating it from the dining room. Adjoining the reception room are a series of four windows and six doors made of art glass, which have a wisteria motif, similar to the tree of life windows at the Darwin D. Martin House; the doors lead west to the gallery and the rear garden. South of the reception room was Dana's private bedroom and bathroom, decorated with art glass windows. The rest of the first floor has three major rooms: a dining room, drawing–living room, and gallery.

The dining room is a double-story space with a barrel-vaulted ceiling spanned by beams, which contain friezes with sumac motifs. There are art-glass windows and chandeliers, along with Japanese prints on the walls. The chandeliers, described as butterfly lights, are suspended from each corner, with triangular and square panes. Niedecken designed a floral mural for the Dana–Thomas House's dining room, which depicts purple asters, goldenrod, and sumac. The mural was Niedecken's first recorded collaboration with Wright and his only one still in place in one of Wright's houses. Adjoining the mural are art-glass panels. During dinners, musicians could perform on a balcony, which was originally decorated with urns. Wright placed the tympanum behind the balcony, concealing it with a frame resembling a post and lintel. The dining room also has a protruding breakfast alcove, which extends off the north (rear) wall and has a low ceiling. The alcove's curved wall, along with low passages extending west and east of the dining room, contrasted with the dining room's high ceiling, creating a basilica-like feeling.

Kitchens and servant rooms, extending west of the dining room, were decorated sparsely. Leading off the east wall (north of the reception hall) is a Victorian drawing room or den, with a fireplace retained from the Lawrence House. This room was retained to comply with Rheuna Lawrence's will and is about one-quarter of the old Lawrence House's size. The drawing room itself was largely remodeled to designs by Wright, with decorations such as art-glass windows and wall-mounted lamps, but the fireplace retains a carved-butterfly motif predating Wright's renovation. East of both the reception hall and drawing room is a living room, which has window or door openings on each wall. The living room has a "T"-shaped floor plan, with its narrower stem facing east toward a fireplace. The wider western section contains niches on the north and south walls, which extend the width of the original Lawrence House. The living room has a wood-plank ceiling; the stem of the "T" has a higher ceiling than the side portions.

Gallery interior with barrel vault ceiling

A conservatory connects the gallery in the west and the reception room to the east. This conservatory, originally furnished with Boston ferns, measures 50 feet (15 m) long and has large windows. There is also an art-glass skylight above the conservatory, along with a porch just outside the windows. At the conservatory's western end are a stair to the basement library, along with doors leading to a winding passageway to the gallery.

The gallery, also referred to as the studio, is a double-height space with a large fireplace and a balcony, similar in design to the living room Wright designed at Francis W. Little House II. To reduce vibrations from passing trains, the gallery's walls and floor are built on separate foundations. The gallery's furnishings include a settle with shelves, tables for displaying artwork, and a refillable, built-in champagne barrel that could dispense champagne during parties. The gallery also has a barrel-vaulted ceiling similar to that of the dining room. The windows are recessed between the ceiling beams, creating bays. The gallery's eastern wall has an arched art-glass window hanging from a frame, while the balcony is recessed from the opposite wall.

==== Second story ====
There are three bedrooms on the second floor, which connect to the balconies overlooking the entrance hall and dining room. The master bedroom is at the east end of the house, directly above the living room within the remaining section of the Lawrence House. This room has a fireplace separating two beds, along with an art glass window. The master suite also has a door to a small dressing room, as well as a master bathroom accessed by mirrored cabinets.

The auxiliary bedrooms were intended for her cousin and guests; each contained their own bathrooms. Unlike the large children's bedrooms Wright designed, the auxiliary bedrooms are smaller because they were intended for adults, who Wright anticipated would spend little of their waking hours in the bedroom. The cousin's bedroom is raised slightly above the balcony level and has a built-in seat, bathroom, and dressing room. An additional room, used briefly by Dana's mother Mary, was converted to storage after Mary died. Two more bedrooms were devoted to maids and are also located in the remaining portion of the Lawrence House; they are also raised slightly. Just beneath the balcony level is a passageway to the kitchen wing, where there are stairs both ascending to the servant bathrooms and descending to the kitchen level.

==== Basement ====
Since the Dana–Thomas House was built directly on the foundations of the Lawrence House, it has a finished basement, unlike much of Wright's work. (Note: Heinz 1995, p. 23, describes the Dana–Thomas House as one of two Wright-designed residences with a furnished basement, the other being the Martin House.) Directly beneath the main entrance is an arched space with sidewalk prisms and a vault door. A bowling alley, with a vaulted ceiling, is placed in the basement. Used for duckpin bowling, it is the only sporting facility that Wright is known to have designed. The bowling alley's west end has a steel vault door with inscriptions of Dana's and her parents' names, while at the bowling alley's east end, a stair ascends to the entrance hall. The rest of the main house's basement is used as storage space.

The library (also known as the reading room) is directly under the gallery and has a fireplace of its own. It is about 55 feet (17 m) below grade and is slightly above the rest of the basement. From inside, the library is reached from the conservatory staircase. Local children could also access the library through an exterior staircase used by local children, which connects with a triple-height foyer under the gallery ceiling. The library itself has double-sided bookcases, a darkroom behind the fireplace on the west wall, and a compartment to the north wall. The bookcases are set off from the walls, giving the impression of smaller rooms. Also under the gallery is a small wine cellar.

A plate from the Wasmuth Portfolio (1910), depicting the floor plan of the Dana–Thomas House

=== Furnishings and objects ===
When she moved into the house, Dana's possessions included vases, spoons, a comb, and hand-painted cups and saucers. Dana owned three carriages (one for everyday trips, one for special occasions, and one for hauling heavy items); two of the carriages still exist. Wright also gave Dana five Japanese block prints obtained from his trips to Japan. Furnishings included yellow-green curtains and brown carpets. In conjunction with the house's design, Wright designed all the furniture, which was manufactured by John Ayers. The objects Wright designed included oak sofas, wooden side tables, and beds with simple quarter-sawn oak headboards and footboards.

Wright's chair designs included a piece with an octagonal back, a slatted armchair, an armchair with a slanted back, a reclining chair, a settle, and several spindle-backed chairs with spindles at varying heights. The backs of the dining chairs have spindles and were built to three heights. Side chairs with short backs, 29 inches (740 mm) high, were built for the library. Wright's table designs included a long table and smaller square tables in the dining room, which could seat four people when arranged individually or up to forty people when pushed together. Other table designs included a square-topped library table with cabinets underneath, as well as a print table made of quarter-sawn oak. Wright also made a music cabinet made of oak and leaded glass, which has been described as his only music stand and his only freestanding furnishing with art glass.

Wright also designed lamps, including one with a 16-sided lampshade. His lamp designs include single- and double-pedestal lamps with art-glass lampshades, as well as pyramidal lamps installed at the entrance level above the basement windows. One of the house's lamp designs is similar to a "butterfly lamp" that Wright designed in 1904.

==== Extant items ====
When the house became a museum, it retained more of its original furnishings than most other Wright-designed houses. These included about 100 of the original pieces of furniture and all 250 art glass windows, along with about 200 lights. The entire collection of objects and furnishings was estimated at $50–70 million in 1988. (Note: Equivalent to $114–$160 million in 2024) In 2007, the Dana–Thomas House received a donation of some Dana–Lawrence family possessions, including a print of President Abraham Lincoln and a Turkish rug. Except for a small number of spindle-sided chairs and some copper weed-holders, all of the house's furniture has been documented.

Some of the original decorations have been re-acquired at significant cost, including six objects obtained for $330,000 in 1987, (Note: Equivalent to $0.8 million in 2024) four chairs for $125,000 in 1989, (Note: Equivalent to $0.3 million in 2024) and one of the house's two original double-pedestal lamps for $704,000 in 1989. (Note: Equivalent to $1.5 million in 2024) Although collectors initially did not challenge the museum's bid to re-acquire some of the house's own decorations, this attitude had changed by the 1990s. For example, after a bidding war, the museum obtained one of the original urns for $288,500 in 1998, (Note: Equivalent to $0.5 million in 2024) then a record-high price for any urn designed by Wright. In another case, the museum lost an auction for the other double-pedestal lamp, which was sold in 2003 for almost $2 million; this lamp was resold in 2025 for $7.5 million, setting a record for any Wright-designed furnishing.

== Management ==
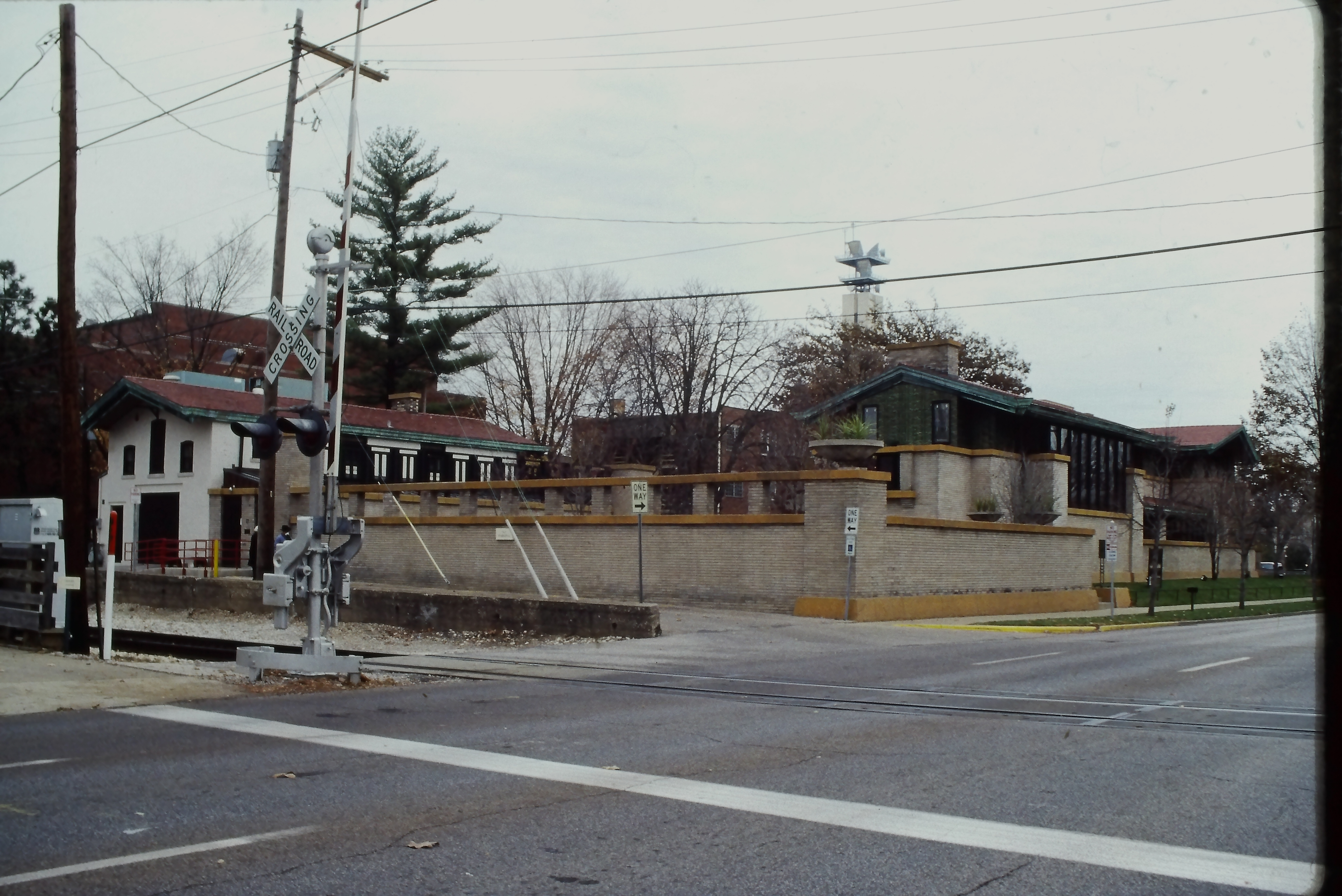
View from the railroad tracks to the west

The Dana–Thomas House is operated by the Illinois Department of Natural Resources (IDNR), an agency of the government of Illinois. The Dana–Thomas House Foundation, created in 1983, was established to help preserve the house, promote the museum, organize events and programs, and raise funds. The foundation has been a tax-exempt nonprofit organization since 1987.

When the museum opened in 1982, it initially hosted tours three days a week. As of 2026, the house is open daily for guided tours hosted four times a day; it is closed on selected holidays throughout the year. The tours are admission-free and cover the house's architecture and Wright, Dana, and the Thomases. The museum has also hosted other types of tours focusing on various aspects of the house. These have included Attention to Detail tours, about the house's architectural details, and Wright Concepts tours, about architectural principles that are used in Wright's other designs. Photography of the interior is prohibited, and visitors cannot access the house outside of guided tours.

The visitor center displays a Lego model of the house, made by a local resident. The Dana–Thomas House Foundation operates the Sumac Shop, a gift shop in the visitor center, which sells items such as books, monographs, stationery, and jewelry. The shop's merchandise sales raise money for the house's programs and events. The house hosts concerts, ice-cream socials, butterfly viewings, luncheons, meetings, and anniversary events. Celebrations hosted at the house have included those for Wright's birthday (during which activities and performances are hosted), Dana's birthday, and the Christmas and holiday season. Each Christmas season, the museum also hosts Luminarias Evening (where sidewalks and ledges are lit by about 1,000 candles), as well as children's storytime readings.

== Impact and legacy ==
Blair Kamin wrote that the house had been "a noteworthy event in Wright's eight-decade career". Eric Lloyd Wright, Wright's grandson, credited both Wright and Dana with the success of the design. William L. Hamilton of The New York Times said the Dana–Thomas House had been one of several major 20th-century house designs commissioned by women, along with others such as the Rietveld Schröder House and Farnsworth House. Conversely, writer Mark Heyman said Wright might not have been fully satisfied with the design, and that the last time he ever published the plans was in 1910. Because the house was not built from scratch, it was excluded from many older studies of Wright's work. Wright himself excluded discussion of the house from his autobiography, though he considered the house's glasswork to be among his best glass designs.

=== Reception ===
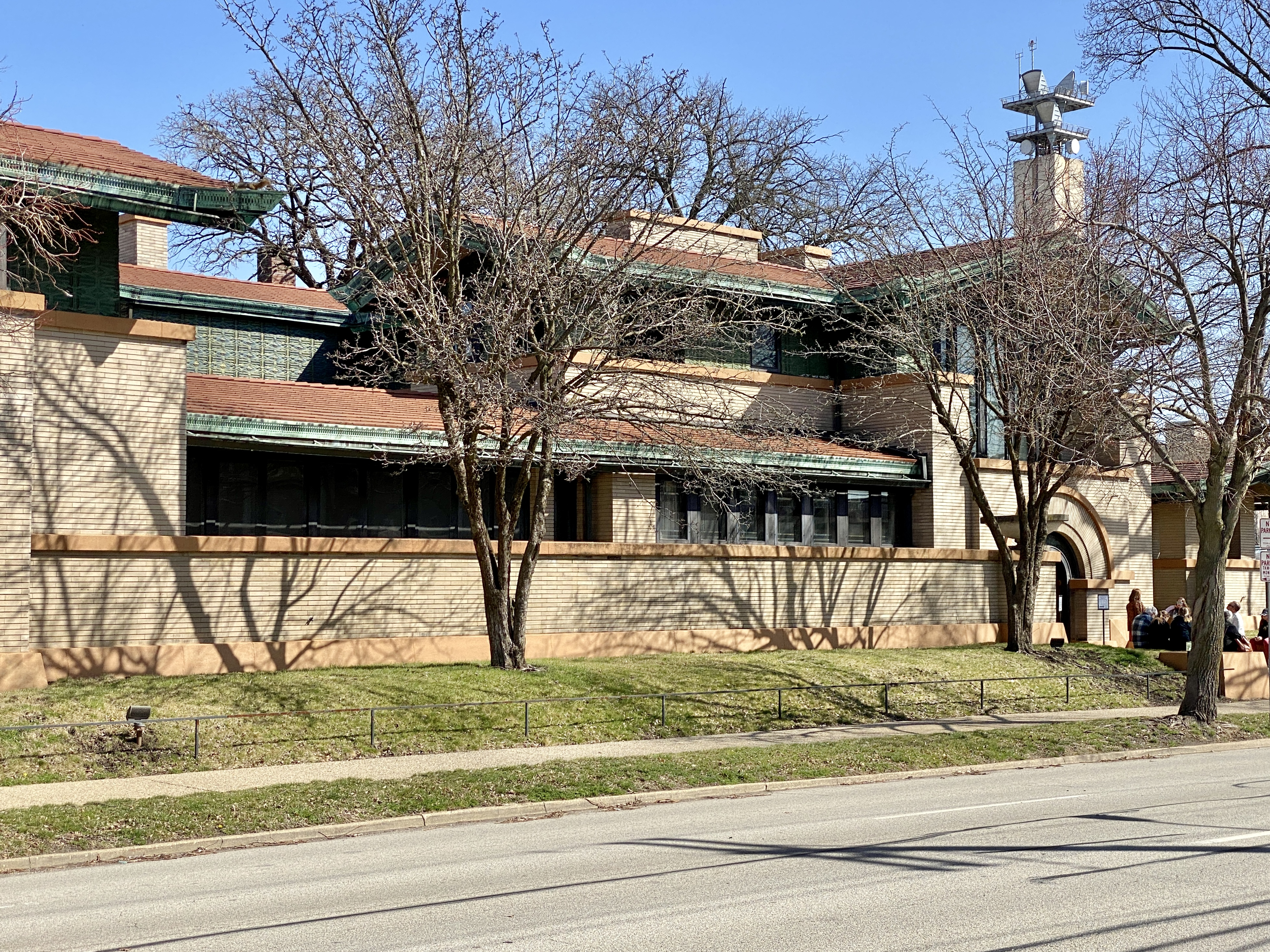
The house's southern (Lawrence Avenue) elevation seen from the west

When the house opened, neighbors dubbed it an Oriental palace because of its unusual design features. Donald Hoffmann called the Dana–Thomas House "a wonderful fantasy" in 1981, while Washington Post writer Bill Howarth wrote in 1983 that the building was "dark inside, too severe and sculpted for comfort". Brendan Gill wrote that the lack of restrictions on Wright's commission contributed to "the distinction of the Dana house". Thomas Heinz wrote that the Dana–Thomas House "contains the best of many types of designs" and that the only other Wright design to rival the Dana–Thomas House's architectural merit was the Darwin D. Martin House. Hoffmann said the building's design "magnifies the sense of shelter and at the same time conquers any sense of confinement".

When the renovation was completed, in 1990, The New York Times wrote that the house's preservation was "no small miracle", at a time when many Wright designs were being sold off. The Globe and Mail likened it to "pagodas joined by a low walkway" and said the preserved furnishings made the house stand out from other Wright designs. Wright biographer Meryle Secrest in 1992 called the Dana–Thomas House "one of the most ambitious houses of Wright's Prairie Style", and the Milwaukee Journal wrote the next year that the house, along with the Lincoln Home National Historic Site, was among Springfield's "most impressive sites". A Chicago Tribune writer said in 1999 that the house "remains a Midwestern monument", albeit to Wright rather than to Dana, Springfield residents, or the prairie.

In 2002, a writer for the Los Angeles Times compared his first visit to the unveiling of King Tut's Tomb. In 2016, a writer for the Chicago Reader wrote that the house was the most interesting building in Springfield, with its open floor plan and Prairie-style features, although "it lacks the old-world opulence of the Illinois State Capitol". That year, The Telegraph called it "a fine example" of the Prairie style. Lisa Schrenk wrote in 2021 that the design was "a magnificent example of what Wright could achieve with a willing client and a vibrant office environment".

=== Media and exhibits ===
Objects from the house have been displayed at museums. The windows have been exhibited at the Cooper Hewitt Museum, American Craft Museum, and Orange County Museum of Art. A lamp from the house has been shown at the Kelvingrove Art Gallery and Museum, and the Museum of Modern Art also has a door from one of the bookcases. Replicas of objects from the house have also been sold, including two models of lamps, art-glass pendants and sconces, dining chairs, and frieze panels. One company manufactured a set of Prairie Style dining furniture based on the measurements of the house's furniture. The house's gift shop has sold items with motifs inspired by the house's decorations, including neckties, drink coasters, table clocks, umbrellas, scarves, jewelry, and stationery.

Soon after the house opened, it was showcased in the 1910 Wasmuth Portfolio, a collection of lithographs of Wright's buildings. A view of the building was featured on the title pages of some of the Thomas Company's productions, and the company commissioned a book about the house's history in 1950. Thomas Heinz's book Dana House: Frank Lloyd Wright (1995) and Donald Hoffmann's book Frank Lloyd Wright's Dana House (1996) both detail the Dana–Thomas House's history and architecture. The house is detailed in Uncommon Places: The Architecture of Frank Lloyd Wright, a documentary that aired on PBS Wisconsin in 1984, and it was featured in Bob Vila's A&E Network 1996 production, Guide to Historic Homes of America.

Photographs of the house were printed in a book created by Pedro E. Guerrero, Wright's longtime photographer, and in the book Frank Lloyd Wright: The Rooms by Margo Stipe and Alan Weintraub. Restoration plans and documents for the Dana–Thomas House are held by the Ryerson & Burnham Libraries at the Art Institute of Chicago.

=== Landmark designations and rankings ===
The Dana–Thomas House was listed as a National Historic Landmark in 1976. It was also designated as a city landmark in 1989. The Dana–Thomas House is designated as a Illinois state historic site, the Dana–Thomas House Historic Site. Since 2018, the Dana–Thomas House has been part of the Frank Lloyd Wright Trail, a collection of 13 buildings designed by Wright in Illinois.

In conjunction with the museum's opening, the National Trust for Historic Preservation gave the state government a preservation award. The Advisory Council on Historic Preservation gave the house another preservation award in 1992, after the house was renovated. In 2007, the Dana–Thomas House ranked 114th among 150 buildings on the American Institute of Architects' (AIA) list of America's Favorite Architecture. In celebration of the 2018 Illinois Bicentennial, the Dana–Thomas House was selected as one of the Illinois 200 Great Places by AIA's Illinois chapter.

== See also ==
- List of Frank Lloyd Wright works
- National Register of Historic Places listings in Sangamon County, Illinois
- List of National Historic Landmarks in Illinois
