= Fisher Building (disambiguation) =

The Fisher Building is a landmark office tower in Detroit, Michigan, United States.

Fisher Building may also refer to:

- Fisher Building (Chicago), an early skyscraper in Illinois
- Fisher Building-Latham Block, a commercial building in Springfield, Illinois

== See also ==
- Fisher's Building, Christchurch, New Zealand
