= Wasmuth Portfolio =

Folio of lithographs by Frank Lloyd Wright

A plate from the Wasmuth Portfolio, depicting the floor plan of the Dana–Thomas House

The Wasmuth Portfolio (1910) is a two-volume folio of 100 lithographs of the work of the American architect Frank Lloyd Wright (1867–1959) and employees of his Oak Park studio.

Titled Ausgeführte Bauten und Entwürfe von Frank Lloyd Wright, it was published in Germany in 1911 by the Berlin publisher Ernst Wasmuth, with an accompanying monograph by Wright. It contained plans and perspectives (in linework only) of buildings designed between 1893 and 1909. It was the first publication of any of Wright's work to appear anywhere in the world. 500 copies reserved for American distribution burned in the Taliesin fire, delaying full recognition of Wright's accomplishment in his native land for years to come.

The portfolio is significant as a link between Wright's pioneering American architecture, and the first generation of modernist architects in Europe. Wright toured Europe for a year from October 1909 through October 1910, partly to support the publication of the portfolio, but also to experience European architectural history at first hand.

Wright's early influence in northern Europe is unquestionable: Le Corbusier is known to have had and shared a copy; Czech architect Antonin Raymond and Austrian architects Rudolf Schindler and Richard Neutra all re-located to the United States in hopes of working for Wright; and one look at Willem Marinus Dudok's 1924 Hilversum Town Hall betrays its origins. At the time of the portfolio's publication, three influential architects of the twentieth century (Le Corbusier, Ludwig Mies van der Rohe and Walter Gropius) were all working essentially as apprentices in the atelier of Peter Behrens in Berlin, where it has been said that work stopped for the day when the portfolio arrived. If this story is true, it reveals the magnitude of the immediate impact of Wright's architecture in European circles, since Behrens could have conceivably received a copy of the Wasmuth portfolio merely days or weeks after its publication.

Wright would never admit that the exchange worked both ways, always claiming that he took nothing from his year in Europe, but the work of Wright scholar Anthony Alofsin suggests that Wright was heavily influenced by the work of the Vienna Secession. In turn, the Dutch De Stijl movement follows Wright's designs by just a few years. De Stijl's major contributors credit Wright with some influence.

Approximately half of the images in the Wasmuth Portfolio are believed to be reworked renderings by the architect and one-time Wright assistant Marion Mahony Griffin, whose visual style has a lot to do with the publication's success.

As of 2009, the Portfolio is in print as Drawings and Plans of Frank Lloyd Wright: The Early Period (1893–1909).

== List of selected works contained in the Wasmuth Portfolio ==
- Edwin H. Cheney House, Oak Park, Illinois (in a National Register of Historic Places District)
- Como Orchard Summer Colony, near Darby, Montana
- Coonley House, Riverside, Illinois (a National Historic Landmark)
- Dana–Thomas House, Springfield, Illinois (a National Historic Landmark)
- Thomas P. Hardy House, Racine, Wisconsin (a National Register of Historic Places listing)
- William R. Heath House, Buffalo, New York
- Larkin Administration Building, Buffalo, New York (demolished in 1950)
- Darwin D. Martin House, Buffalo, New York (a National Historic Landmark)
- Park Inn Hotel, Mason City, Iowa (a National Register of Historic Places listing)
- Robie House, Hyde Park, Chicago (a National Historic Landmark)
- Unity Temple, Oak Park, Illinois (a National Historic Landmark)
- Westcott House, Springfield, Ohio (a National Register of Historic Places listing)
- Winslow House, River Forest, Illinois (a National Register of Historic Places listing)

== See also ==
- List of Frank Lloyd Wright works
