= Lawrence Memorial Library (Springfield, Illinois) =

Library in Springfield, Illinois

Coordinates: 39.783205°N 89.654315°W

- Location: 101 East Laurel, Springfield, Illinois, United States
- Established: 1905
- Architect: Frank Lloyd Wright

The Lawrence Memorial Library in Springfield, Illinois, was designed by American architect Frank Lloyd Wright for client Susan Lawrence Dana in 1905. Wright had previously designed Dana's Springfield residence, now known as the Dana–Thomas House, in 1902.

Dana commissioned the library for the West Room of the Rheuna D. Lawrence School. The school was named after her father, who had been the president of the School Board of Springfield until his death in 1901. According to William Allin Storrer, the memorial library had been mostly demolished but was restored in 1993.

== See also ==
- List of Frank Lloyd Wright works

== Sources ==
- Storrer, William Allin (1993). The Frank Lloyd Wright Companion. Chicago: University of Chicago Press. ISBN 978-0-226-77624-8. (S.073)
