= Susan Lawrence Dana =

American philanthropist (1862–1946)

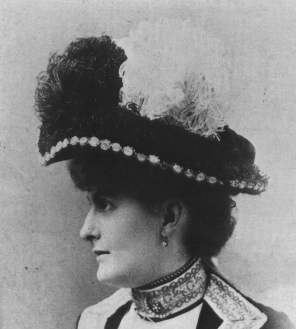
- Born: October 13, 1862; Springfield, Illinois, U.S.
- Died: February 20, 1946 (aged 83); Springfield, Illinois, U.S.

Susan Lawrence Dana (October 13, 1862 – February 20, 1946) was an American philanthropist and heiress to a substantial fortune, including silver mines in the Rocky Mountains. After her father died, Dana took over his western mines and properties throughout central Illinois. She was also a leading philanthropic figure in Illinois. In the early 1900s, Dana commissioned the architect Frank Lloyd Wright to design and build the Dana–Thomas House in Springfield, as well as a library for the Lawrence Education Center, named after her father.

In the 1920s, Dana was heavily involved with the National Woman's Party (NWP) and its efforts to gain equal rights for women. The NWP appointed Dana as the legislative chairwoman for the Illinois branch in 1923. In this role, she organized meetings and communications, and lobbied the legislature. She was in regular correspondence with Alice Paul and Burnita Shelton Matthews regarding these efforts. Dana also arranged for Anita Pollitzer, National Secretary of the NWP, to give a speech at her house in 1923. She also hosted a number of other events that focused on social justice. Dana was appointed by Illinois Governor Edward Fitzsimmons Dunne as the only woman member of the Commission Half-Century Anniversary of Negro Freedom in 1913. She also served as a member of the Executive Committee of the Sangamon County Republican women's organization. After experiencing the death of family members and two husbands, Lawrence Dana began a spiritual journey, which led to her efforts in the creation of Springfield's Unity Church of Practical Christianity.

She was a member of the Daughters of the American Revolution.

== Dana–Thomas House ==
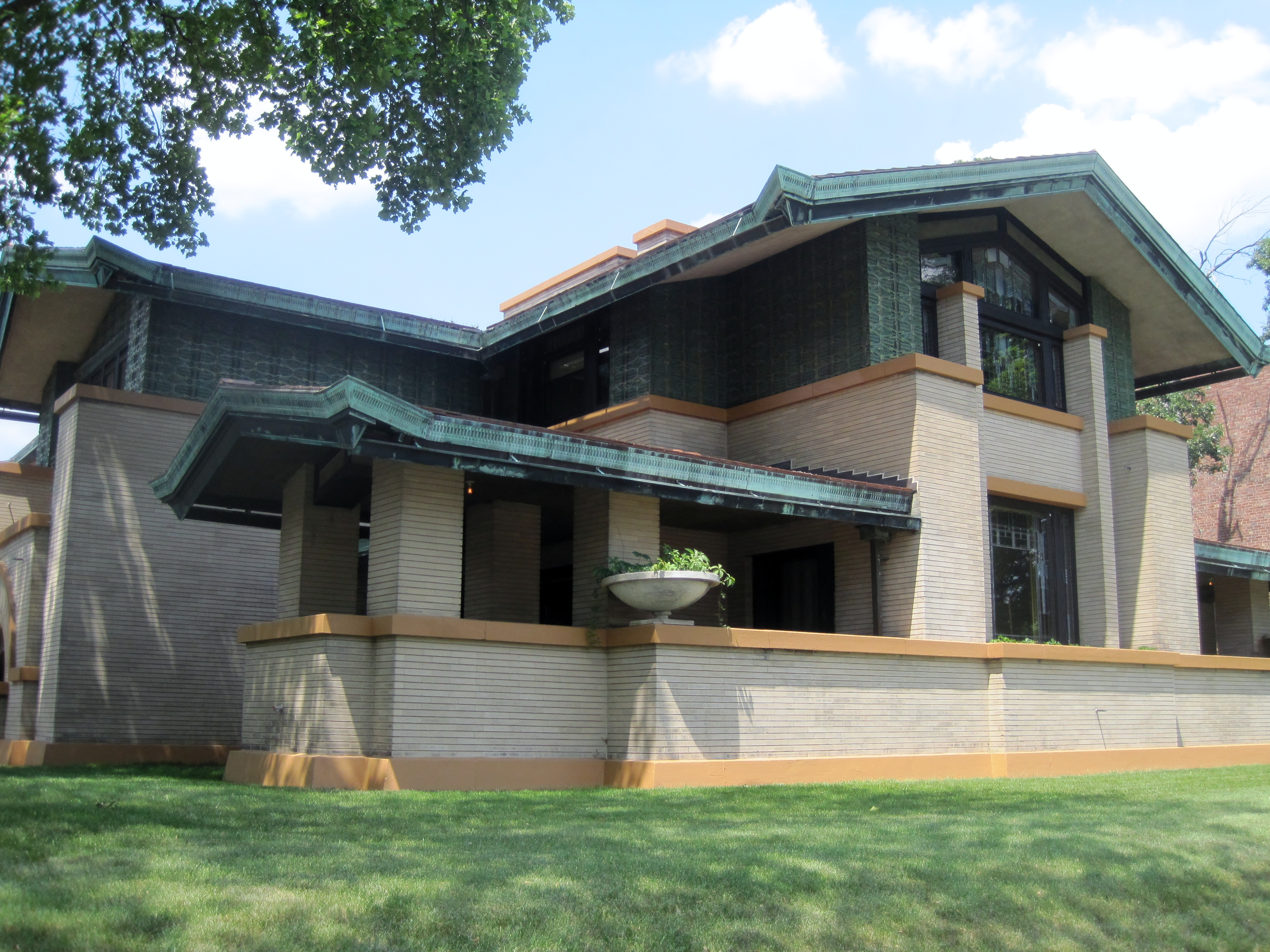
Dana–Thomas House by Frank Lloyd Wright

Susan Lawrence Dana is notable as one of the few women to engage with Frank Lloyd Wright as an architect at this early point in his career. However, Dana's bold design sensibilities, paired with a commitment to advancing social justice for women and within the African American community through political involvement, mark her as a unique patron of architecture at the turn of the century. The project grew and became a blonde Roman brick mansion with 35 rooms on 16 different levels. An anomaly in Springfield, the Dana–Thomas House is considered a masterpiece and one of Wright's finest Prairie designs.

Dana paid $45,000 for the construction and an additional $15,000 for the Wright-designed furnishings. She lived in the home from 1904 until about 1928. In her later years, Dana became less socially active and engaged in her philanthropic work. Suffering from increasing financial constraints, she closed the main house around 1928 and moved to a small cottage on the grounds. As Dana struggled with age-related dementia in the 1940s, her home and its contents were sold. It is now owned by the State of Illinois and open to the public.
