= Virgil Hickox House =

Historic house in Illinois, United States

- U.S. National Register of Historic Places
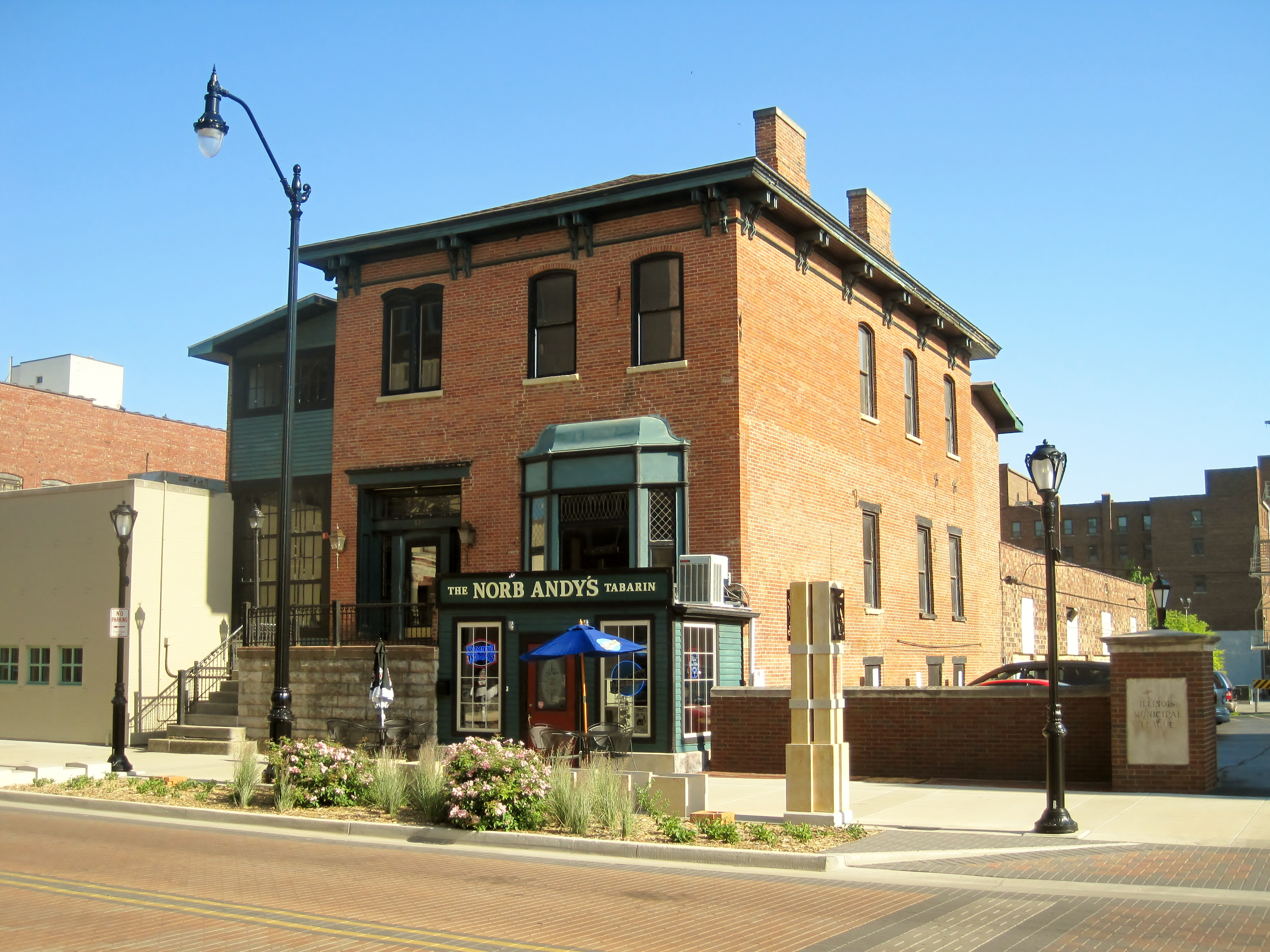

- Location within Illinois Location within the United States
- Location: 518 E. Capitol Ave., Springfield, Illinois
- Coordinates: 39°47′53″N 89°38′55″W
- Area: 0.6 acres (0.24 ha)
- Built: 1839
- Architectural style: Italianate
- NRHP reference No.: 82002600
- Added to NRHP: March 5, 1982

The Virgil Hickox House is a historic house located at 518 East Capitol Avenue in Springfield, Illinois. The house, the only one remaining in downtown Springfield, was built in 1839 for Virgil Hickox and his family. Hickox was a prominent Springfield businessman who helped bring the city its first rail line, an extension of the Chicago and Alton Railroad. In addition, Hickox was a successful attorney and political figure; he chaired the Democratic State Committee for twenty years and was an associate of both Abraham Lincoln and Stephen A. Douglas. The Hickox family remodeled their house several times; when they moved out in 1880, it had largely taken its present form, with an Italianate design featuring bracketed eaves and long arched windows.

The Sangamo Club, a private men's club, opened in the building in 1895 and remained there for over fifteen years. The building became a speakeasy during Prohibition and continued to serve alcohol afterwards as The Norb Andy's Tabarin. The tavern became and remains popular with state legislators; in the 1980s, it was reported to be one of the few remaining bars regularly frequented by politicians.

The building was added to the National Register of Historic Places on March 5, 1982.
