= Price/Wheeler House =

Historic house in Illinois, United States

- U.S. National Register of Historic Places
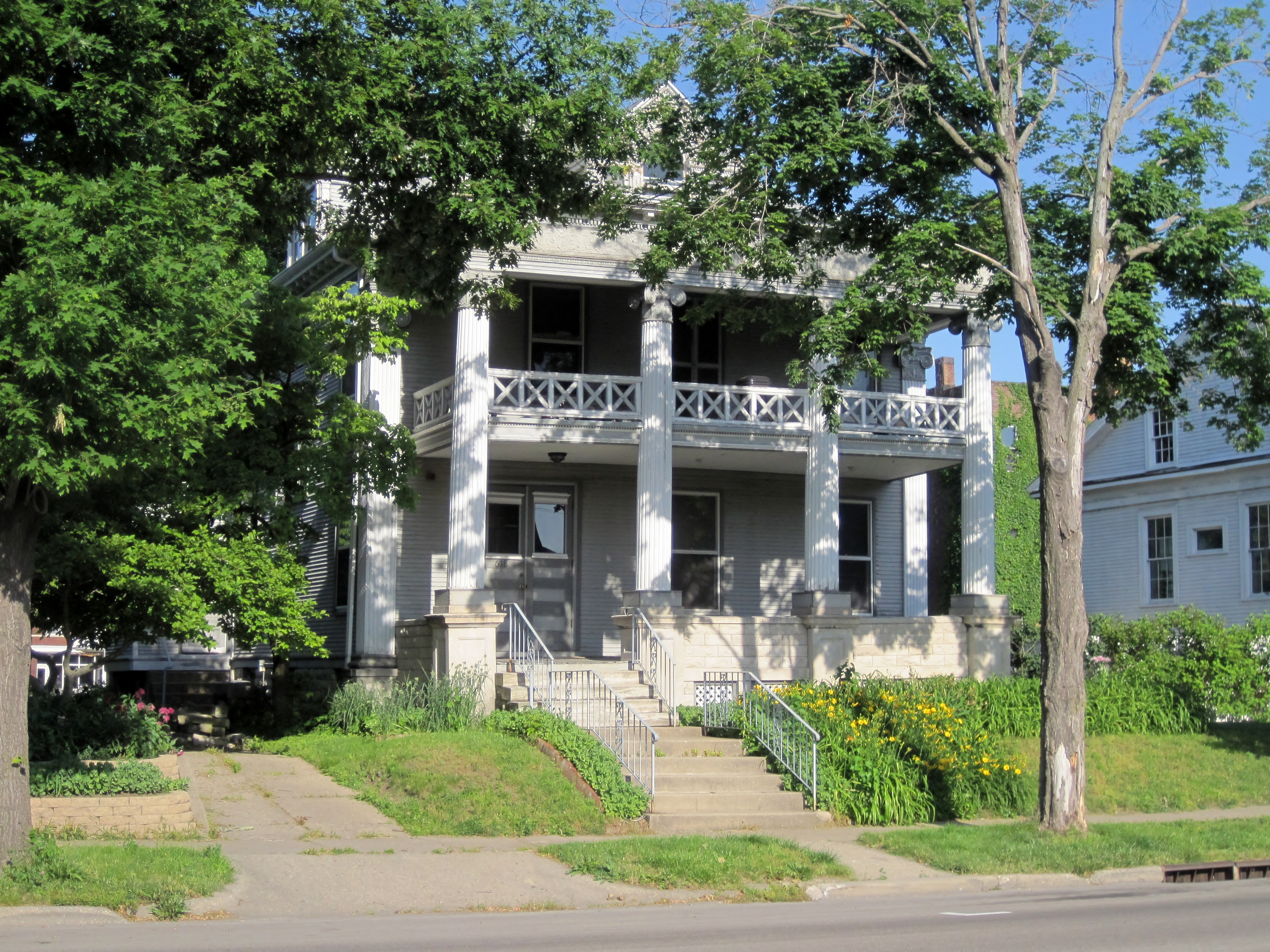

- Location within Illinois Location within the United States
- Location: 618 S. 7th St., Springfield, Illinois
- Coordinates: 39°47′43″N 89°38′46″W
- Area: less than one acre
- Built: 1899
- Architectural style: Classical Revival
- NRHP reference No.: 85000269
- Added to NRHP: February 14, 1985

The Price/Wheeler House is a historic house located at 618 South 7th Street in Springfield, Illinois. Built in 1899, the house was the first of the city's turn-of-the-century Classical Revival residences. The house features a two-story front portico with four Ionic columns and a frieze and dentillated cornice. At the time of its construction, the house's design was unprecedented in Springfield; by 1910, however, the Classical Revival style was well-represented in Springfield's residential architecture. The house was built for Isaiah Price, a businessman who died two years after its construction. Former Springfield mayor and eventual U.S. Representative Loren Wheeler purchased the house in 1904.

The house was added to the National Register of Historic Places on February 14, 1985.
