= Howard K. Weber House =

Historic house in Illinois, United States

- U.S. National Register of Historic Places
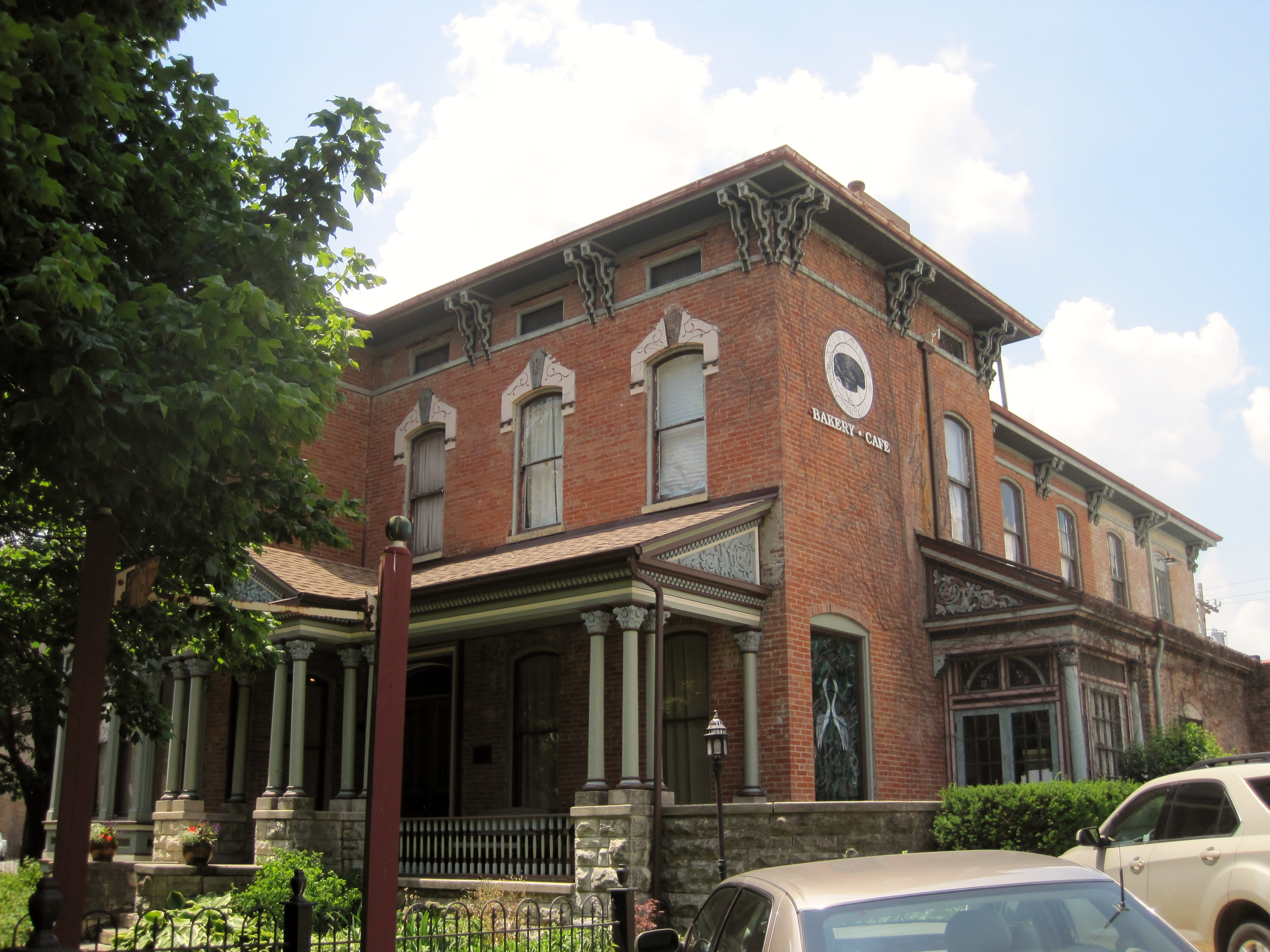

- Location within Illinois Location within the United States
- Location: 925 S. 7th St., Springfield, Illinois
- Coordinates: 39°47′31″N 89°38′49″W
- Area: 0.4 acres (0.16 ha)
- Architectural style: Italianate
- NRHP reference No.: 79000868
- Added to NRHP: October 1, 1979

The Howard K. Weber House is a historic house located at 925 South 7th Street in Springfield, Illinois. While the house was built in the 1840s, its current design comes from a series of additions and renovations which began in 1878. However artifacts discovered in the basement date around the 1820s. Howard K. Weber, a prominent local banker, started this renovation process shortly after buying the house. The house's new design was primarily Italianate, as the style was then nationally popular; its influence can be seen in the asymmetrical plan, the low hip roof with a bracketed cornice, and the arched windows. The house also exhibits a late Victorian influence in its more detailed elements, particularly the first-floor bay windows and the Gothic moldings on the second floor.

The house was added to the National Register of Historic Places on October 1, 1979.
