= Winslow House (River Forest, Illinois) =

Historic house in Illinois, United States

- William H. Winslow House and Stable
- U.S. National Register of Historic Places
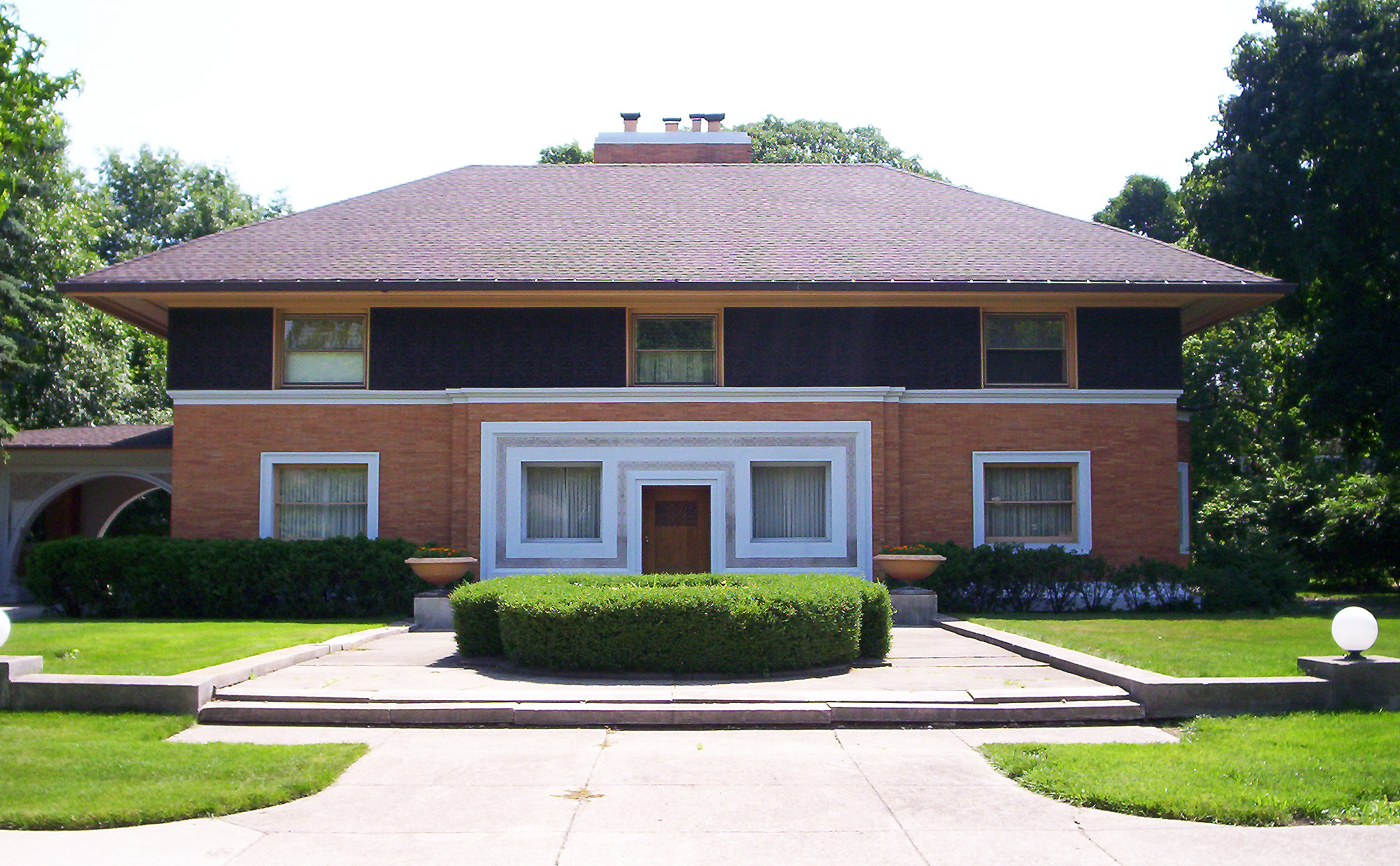

- Location within Illinois Location within the United States
- Interactive map showing the location of William H. Winslow House
- Location: 515 Auvergne Dr River Forest, Illinois
- Coordinates: 41°53′19″N 87°49′44″W
- Built: 1893; 133 years ago
- Architect: Frank Lloyd Wright
- Architectural style: Prairie School
- NRHP reference No.: 70000242
- Added to NRHP: April 17, 1970

The Winslow House is a Frank Lloyd Wright-designed house located at 515 Auvergne Place in River Forest, Illinois. Built in 1894–95, it was his first major commission as an independent architect. While the design owes a debt to the earlier James Charnley House, Wright always considered the Winslow House extremely important to his career. Looking back on it in 1936, he described it as "the first 'prairie house'."

The original owner, William Winslow, was exemplary of Wright's Chicago clients, which the architect described as, "American men of business with unspoiled instincts and ideals." A manufacturer of decorative ironwork, Winslow later worked with Wright on a number of publishing projects, specifically for Keats's The Eve of St. Agnes (1896), and William C. Gannett's The House Beautiful (1896–97). The men were first introduced through Winslow's dealings with Adler and Sullivan, Wright's former employers. He was in the ornamental iron business and his firm had done the facade on the Carson Pirie Scott building for Wright's previous employer. Adler and Sullivan were not interested in performing residential architectural assignments so Winslow turned to Wright.

The house's design is inspired by the works of Wright's mentor Louis Sullivan and anticipates Wright's mature Prairie School buildings of the next decade. Sheltered beneath a low-pitched roof with wide eaves, the home is symmetrical and horizontally divided into a stone section, a golden Roman brick section, and a terra cotta frieze of Sullivanesque ornament. In contrast to the calm and balanced front facade, the rear is a mass of irregular geometric forms. The interior echoes both Wright's own home and the Charnley House, with the fireplace at the center facing the entry with rooms on either side and a hidden main staircase.

The house was added to the National Register of Historic Places on April 17, 1970.

In 2016 the house was sold for $1.375 million. The family of its previous owner, the general manager of a local television station, had owned the house for 57 years.

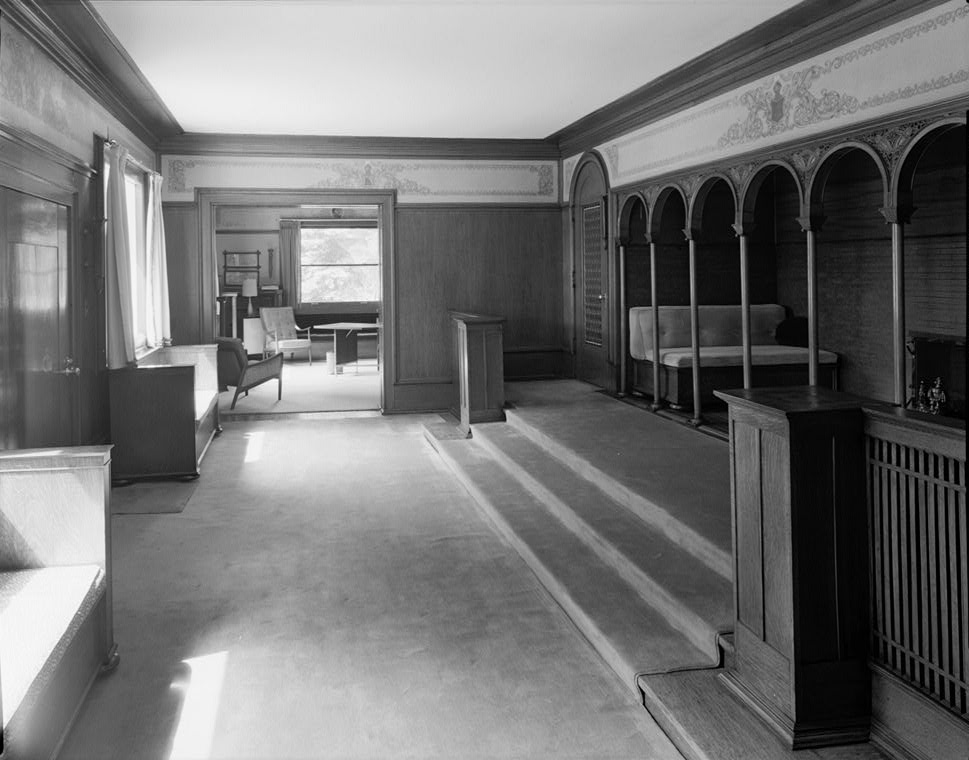
Interior - Entrance Hall

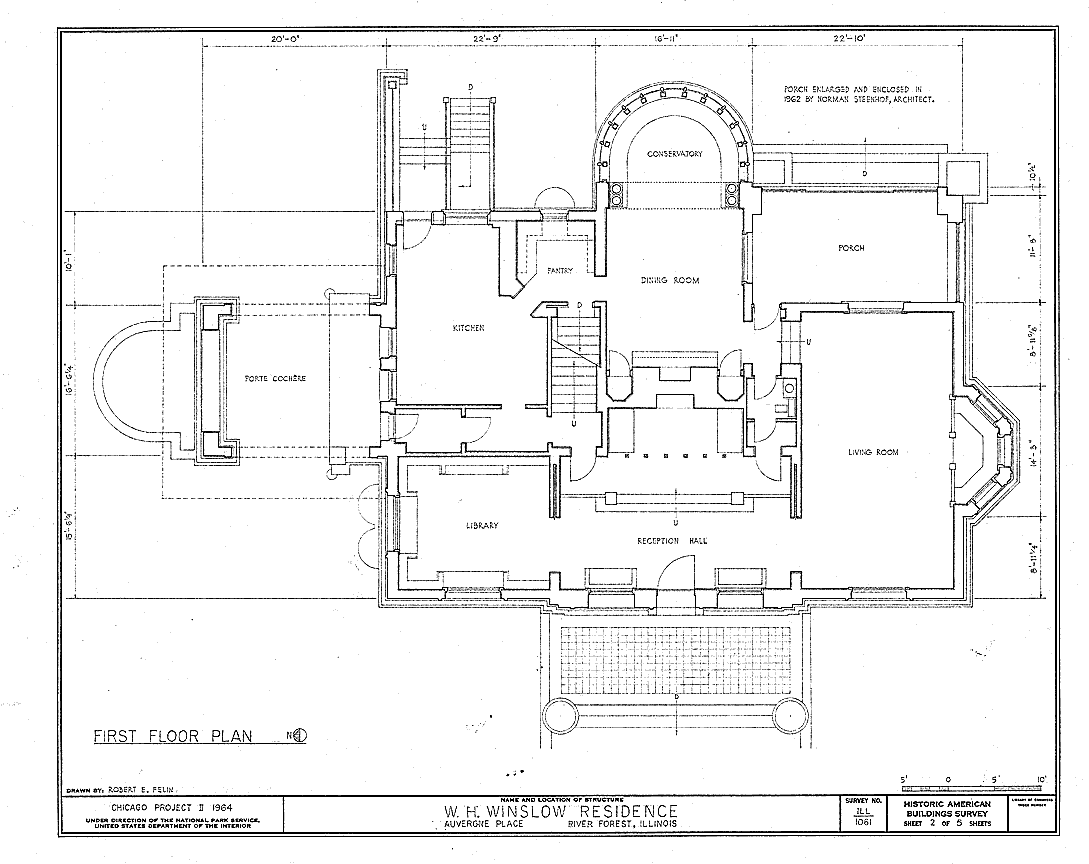
Winslow House floor plan

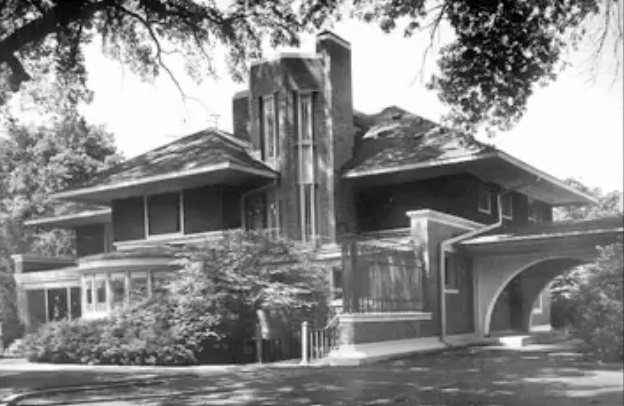
Winslow House rear view

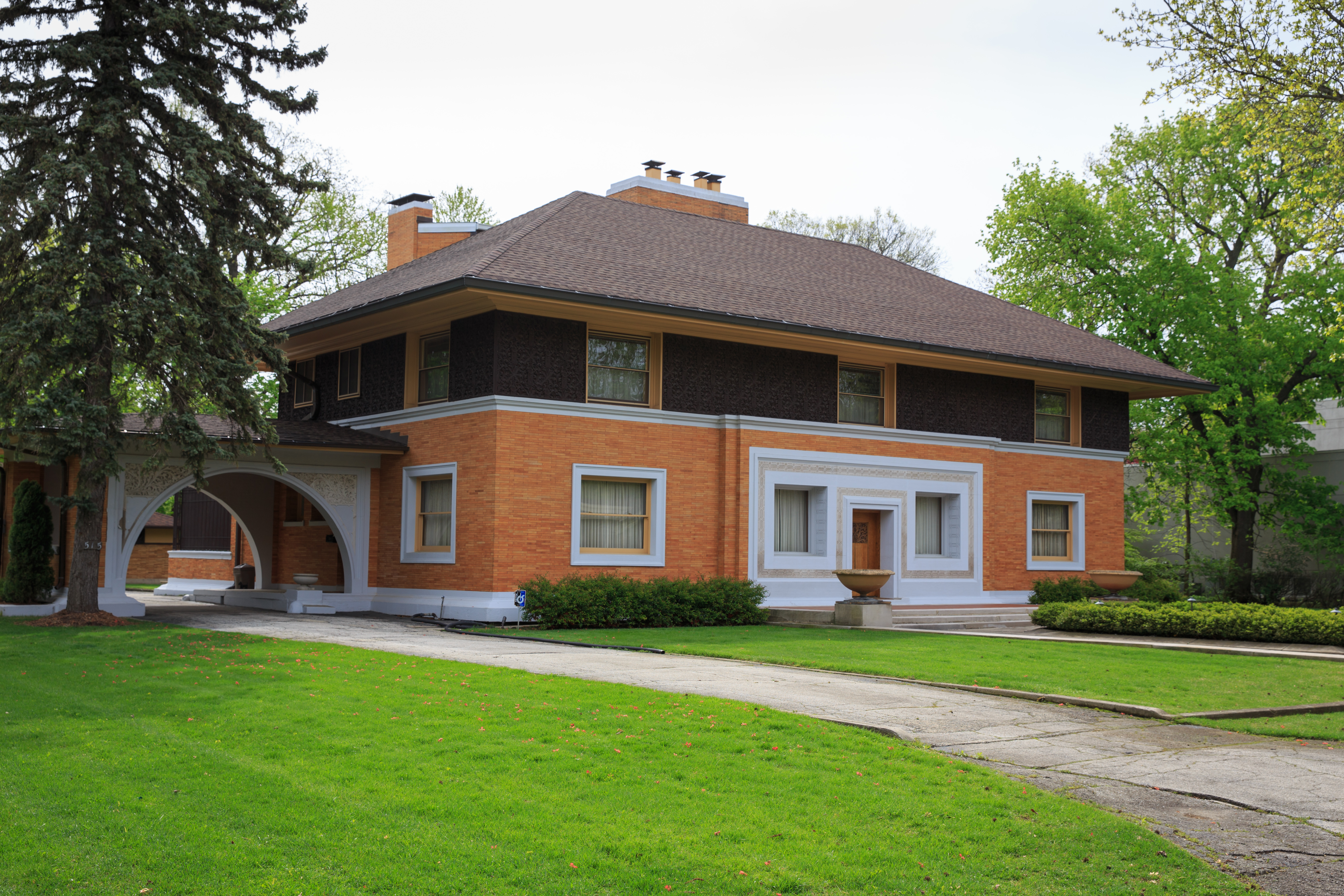

== See also ==
- List of Frank Lloyd Wright works
