= Fisher Building-Latham Block =

- Fisher Building--Latham Block
- U.S. National Register of Historic Places
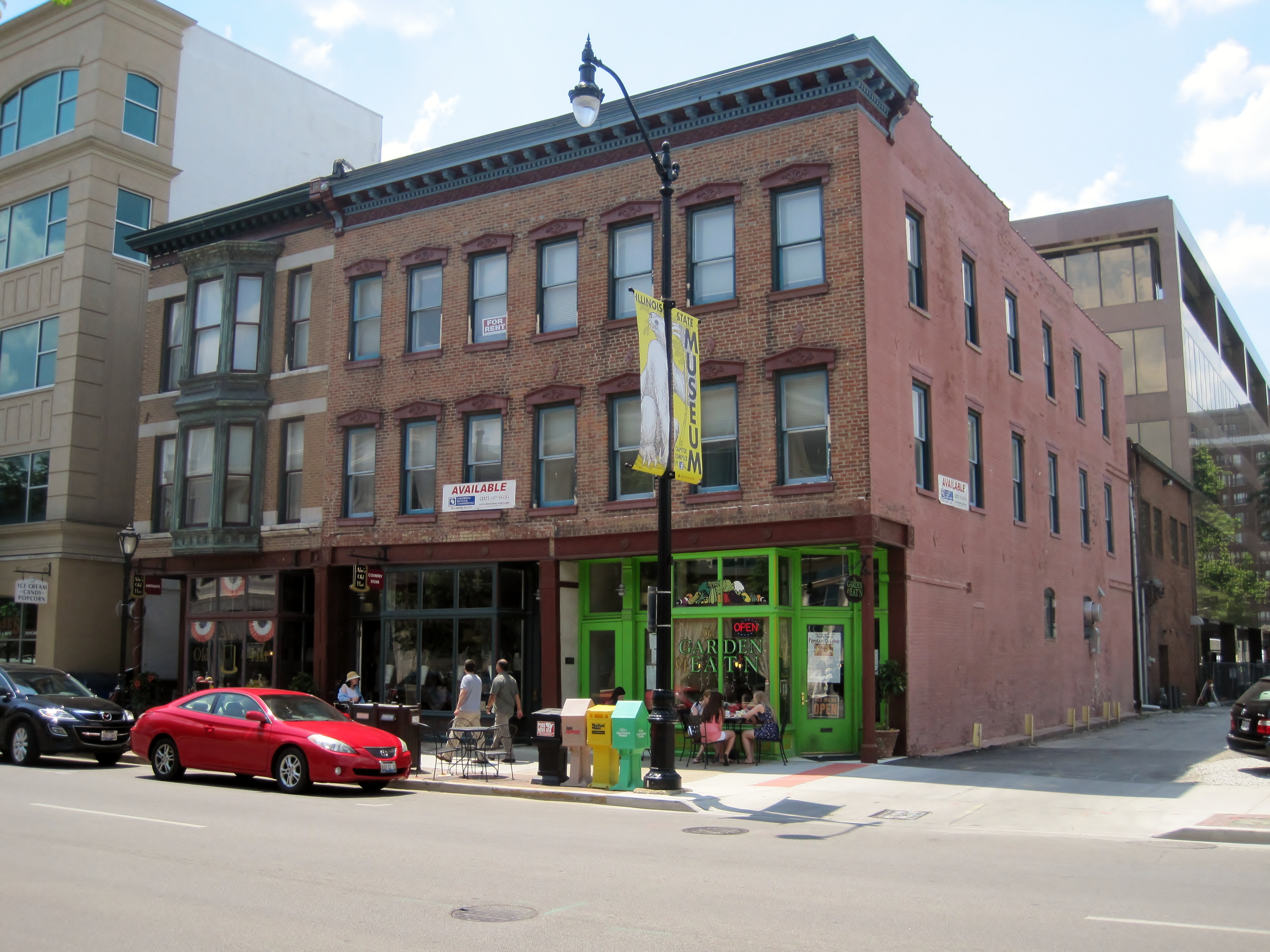

- Location within Illinois Location within the United States
- Location: 111, 113, and 115 N. Sixth St., Springfield, Illinois
- Coordinates: 39°48′08″N 89°38′53″W
- Area: less than one acre
- Built: 1856
- Architectural style: Classical Revival
- NRHP reference No.: 00000411
- Added to NRHP: April 28, 2000

The Fisher Building-Latham Block is a historic commercial structure located at 111, 113, and 115 North Sixth Street in Springfield, Illinois. While built as two separate buildings, the Fisher Building and Latham Block are connected by internal entrances and are now considered components of a single building. Construction on both buildings began in 1856. The larger Latham Block has a typical mid-19th Century commercial design with classical influences, which can be seen in its symmetrical windows with cast iron hoods. While the Fisher Building originally had a similar design, it was renovated in the Classical Revival style in 1900. Its design includes a two-story bay window, a decorative cornice, and limestone trim.

The building was added to the National Register of Historic Places on April 28, 2000.
