= Niedecken =

Niedecken is a surname. Notable people with the surname include:

- George Mann Niedecken (1878–1945), American furniture designer and interior architect
- Junior Niedecken (born 1957), American stock car racing driver
- Wolfgang Niedecken (born 1951), German singer and musician
