= Coonley House =

House in Riverside, Illinois

- Avery Coonley House
- U.S. National Register of Historic Places
- U.S. National Historic Landmark
- U.S. National Historic Landmark District – Contributing property
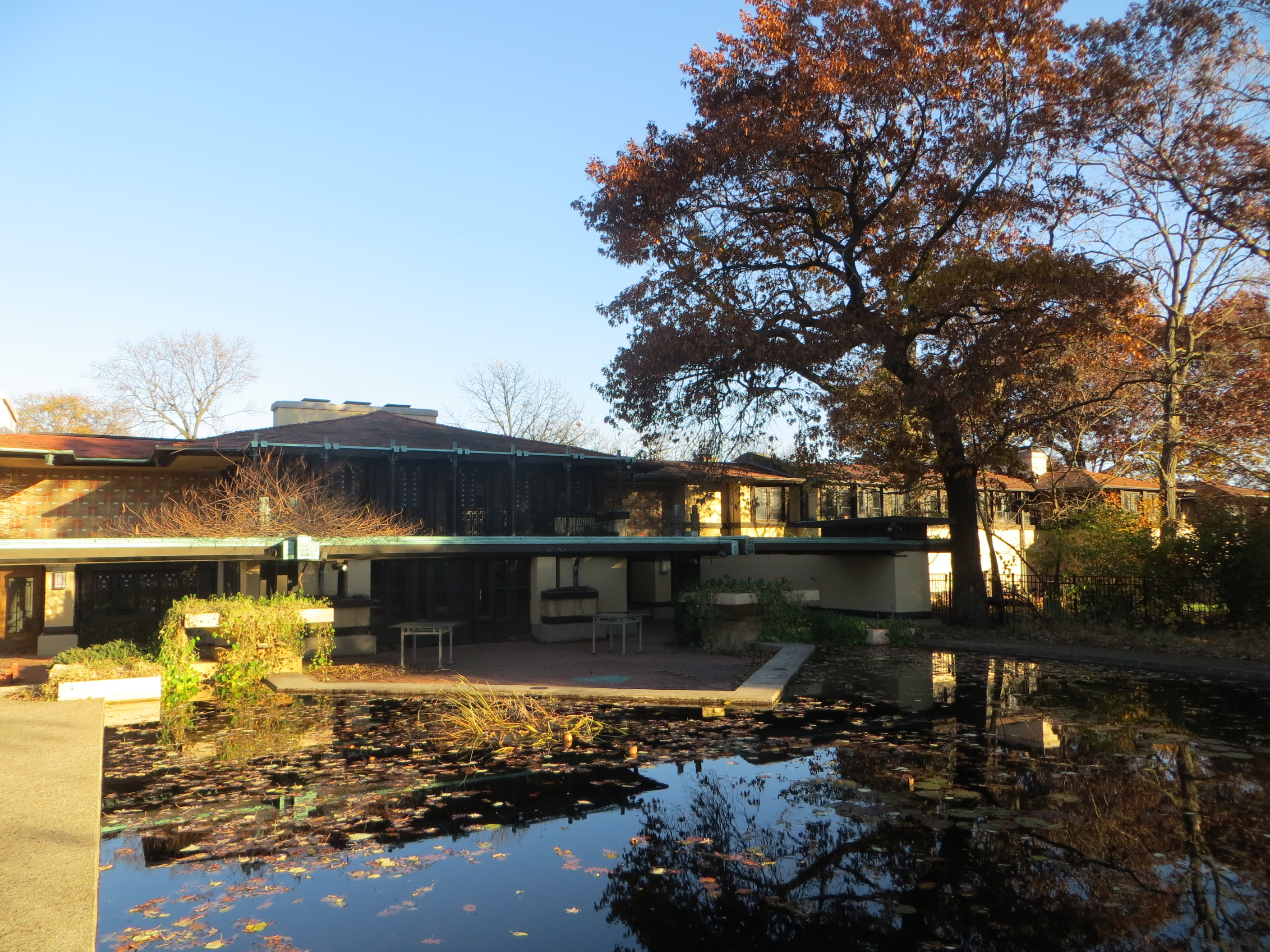
- The northern residence at 281 Bloomingbank Road

- Location within Illinois Location within the United States
- Location: 300 Scottswood Road (southern residence); 281 Bloomingbank Road (northern residence); Riverside, Illinois, US
- Coordinates: 41°49′14″N 87°49′43″W
- Built: 1908–1909
- Architect: Frank Lloyd Wright; William Eugene Drummond (gardener's cottage); Jens Jensen (landscape)
- Architectural style: Prairie School
- Part of: Riverside Historic District (ID69000055)
- NRHP reference No.: 70000243

Significant dates
- Added to NRHP: December 30, 1970
- Designated NHL: December 30, 1970
- Designated NHLDCP: August 29, 1970

The Avery Coonley House (also known as the Avery Coonley Mansion) is a mansion in Riverside, Illinois, United States. Constructed in 1908–1909, it was designed by Frank Lloyd Wright in the Prairie style. The Coonley House, once a single residence, was divided into two residences—300 Scottswood Road and 281 Bloomingbank Road—during the 1950s. It is part of the 10-acre (4.0 ha) Coonley Estate, which has two additional buildings designed by Wright: a carriage house and a gardener's cottage. The Coonley Estate is a National Historic Landmark (NHL) and is included in the Riverside Historic District, a NHL district.

The estate was built for Avery Coonley and his wife Queene Ferry, both heirs to industrial fortunes, who lived there with their daughter Elizabeth for a decade. It was sold in 1921 to Peter Kroehler, a furniture manufacturer from Naperville, Illinois. In 1952, the architect Arnold Skow proposed demolishing much of the property to make way for new homes. A compromise was reached that allowed Skow to preserve the property but divide the estate, including the main house. Since then, the various residences have been resold and renovated multiple times. The main house was damaged by a fire in 1978. In the early 21st century, the carriage house and both sections of the main house were renovated.

The landscape, consisting of extensive raised and sunken gardens, was designed by the landscape architect Jens Jensen. The structure itself is two stories high and is made of frame and stucco on a flat concrete foundation. The entrance hall, playroom, and storage space are on the ground floor, which is treated as a basement. The upper story, with a U-shaped arrangement, is the first example in Wright's work of a zoned plan, with rooms grouped in zones according to function. The larger of the two residences occupies the former public–living room wing on Bloomingbank Road, while the smaller residence occupies the former bedroom wing on Scottswood Road. A servant quarters is attached to the public–living room wing. The house has been praised over the years, and Wright considered the design his most successful work of the time.

== Site ==
The Avery Coonley House is located in the village of Riverside, a suburb of Chicago in Cook County, Illinois, United States. The house is part of an estate designed by Frank Lloyd Wright in the Prairie style, with three buildings (see Coonley House § Architecture). The estate overlooks the Des Plaines River, spanning about 10 acres (4.0 ha). It once occupied an entire city block between Scottswood Road to the south, Bloomingbank Road to the north, and Coonley Road to the east. Due to the river's serpentine route through the village, the block has an irregular shape, described as a teardrop. Nearby is the original Coonley Playhouse, which occupies an adjacent block at 350 Fairbank Road. The entire village was landscaped by Frederick Law Olmsted and Calvert Vaux.

When the estate was built in the 1900s, the site had many trees and was nearly rural in character. The western half of the block remained undeveloped until it was sold in the 1950s. Since then, the estate has been split between five property owners. The main house is divided into two residences, with separate addresses at 300 Scottswood Road to the south and 281 Bloomingbank Road to the north. The other addresses in the complex are 290 Scottswood Road (occupied by a servant cottage), 336 Coonley Road (occupied by a carriage house and sunken gardens), and 348 Coonley Road (formerly the raised garden). The site of the raised garden has been redeveloped with another house, designed in a similar style to the Wright structures. The Coonley House is Wright's only multi-building Prairie-style estate that remains a private residence.

=== Grounds ===
The grounds were landscaped by Jens Jensen. The Coonley House sits on the crest of a small hill and is surrounded by trees. Before the house was built, the center of the hill was flat, and the land sloped down gently to the southwest; it rose up to 10 feet (3.0 m) above the street at Scottswood and Coonley roads. The main house has a largely U-shaped layout surrounding an informal courtyard on three sides. Placed throughout the grounds are a series of sunken and raised gardens. A reflecting pool, abutting the main house to the west, was originally dyed black before being converted into a swimming pool. The pool is positioned directly in front of the living room but, as built, was only partly visible from that room.

There is an entrance court to the east, which is accessed from a service drive to the south, passing under the estate's garage. The estate's primary driveway is from the north, traveling under the kitchen, the entrance court's western edge, and the guest wing; it is adjoined by a walkway. (Note: Snell 1970, p. 2 and McCarter 1997, p. 112, are rotated ninety degrees clockwise from the true orientation; e.g. these sources refer to east as "north". The true orientation of the floor layout is shown in floor diagrams published in Storrer 1993, p. 135, and Wilson & Robinson 1991, p. 128, where east is at the top of the diagram, and north is to the left.) This driveway is paved in gravel, and the walkway is paved in orange tile.

Jensen also oversaw the installation of hardscape features such as trellises and built-in planters. The trellises, along with low walls, are installed throughout the estate to shape its architectural features. One wall surrounds the original estate. Another wall runs through the courtyard, separating the properties. The concrete planters, installed next to the house, copy the square motif found throughout the floor plan. Other hardscape features included poured-concrete tables decorated with fern motifs, along with balcony railings.

== History ==
=== Coonley use ===
Avery Coonley (1870–1920) and his wife Queene (née Adelaide Elizabeth Ferry; 1874–1958) were both heirs to industrial fortunes. Avery was the oldest son of John Clark Coonley, who ran the Chicago Malleable Iron Company, and Lydia Avery Coonley, a writer. Queene's parents were the businessman Dexter M. Ferry—who owned shares in many firms including the Ferry Seed Company—and Adelaide Elizabeth Miller. Avery and Queene may have been introduced by Avery's sister Sarah (who attended Vassar College with Queene), or at their summer houses in Upstate New York. The Coonleys were married in 1901. The Coonleys had one daughter, Elizabeth, born 1902, who later married the architect Waldron Faulkner. The family were politically liberal and were adherents of the Christian Science religious movement.

==== Development ====
In 1906, the Coonley family acquired a plot in Riverside; their decision had been influenced by Elizabeth's birth. At the time, the site was occupied by two existing residences. Queene was more involved in the house's commission than Avery, who preferred traditional architecture. It was Queene who had convinced Avery to meet the architect Frank Lloyd Wright after looking at his other houses; the Coonleys told Wright that they saw in his work "the countenances of principle". Wright stated in his autobiography that the Coonleys' high regard of his work "was to me a great and sincere compliment. So I put my best into the Coonley House." Queene and Wright had taken a quick liking to each other. Wright biographer Meryle Secrest wrote that this was atypical of Wright, saying that "a woman who knew her own mind was the kind of client Wright empathically did not want" unless she shared Wright's outlook on design.

Barry Byrne, a draftsman in Wright's studio, drew up the detailed plans, while Harry Robinson designed details such as the art glass windows. As originally planned, the complex was to include a main house with a servant wing near the eastern end of the block. There were to be a detached stable and garage to the southeast, both served by a driveway from the north, which passed under the middle of the main house. The plans also called for a pergola extending west to a pair of tennis courts. Wright's team revised the plans at least twice to account for trees, terraces, gardens, and other landscape and hardscape features. The plans were completed in 1907, and construction began the next year.

The Coonley family gave Wright an unlimited budget for the new residence. The Wilson Brothers, a prominent local firm that Wright frequently hired, was hired to build the house. George Mann Niedecken, an architect with Wright's studio, was tasked with the interior design, and the Coonleys hired Niedecken to create a mural and custom carpets. Jens Jensen, who had designed Chicago's Humboldt Park, was hired as the landscape architect in 1908, though it is unknown how he was commissioned. The authors Charles E. and Berdeana Aguar write that, given how Jensen and Wright never recommended each other for commissions despite a decades-long relationship, the commission may have come through Queene Coonley, who may have heard of Jensen's previous work or become acquainted with him socially. Avery, who was still hesitant about the house's design, told Wright that he wanted a Georgian house with green shutters; in response, Wright put a green frieze on the new house. The main house is variously cited as having been completed in 1908 or 1909.

==== Usage ====
The Coonleys lived in the main house for about a decade. When the main house was completed, the estate initially also included a servant wing, coachman's house, garage, stable, and gardens. After moving into the house, Queene Coonley—who was a spiritual healer for Christian Science—treated hundreds of patients there. Brendan Gill, one of Wright's biographers, wrote in 1987 that the family "entertained with a formal elegance that one would be unlikely to encounter in the United States in the nineteen-eighties". One picture of Elizabeth Coonley at the house as a young girl, taken in 1910, was widely circulated.

The Coonleys also created a kindergarten at the house; at first intended specifically for Elizabeth, the school was also opened for the use of local children. The Cottage School (later the Avery Coonley School) was expanded by one grade every year, and in 1910, the family bought an adjacent cottage designed by Charles Frederick Whittlesey to house Cottage School. The Coonleys soon rehired Wright for the design of the Coonley Playhouse, which was built nearby in 1912 or 1913. They were among several clients who had hired Wright multiple times, even though he had, at that point, gained a reputation for cost overruns. The Coonleys hired Wright's former associate William Eugene Drummond in 1912 to design a house at 283 Scottswood Road, across from the Coonley House, to house the teachers at the Coonley Playhouse. Drummond also designed a gardener's house next to the main house, which was built sometime between 1911 and 1913.

=== 1920s to 1950s ===
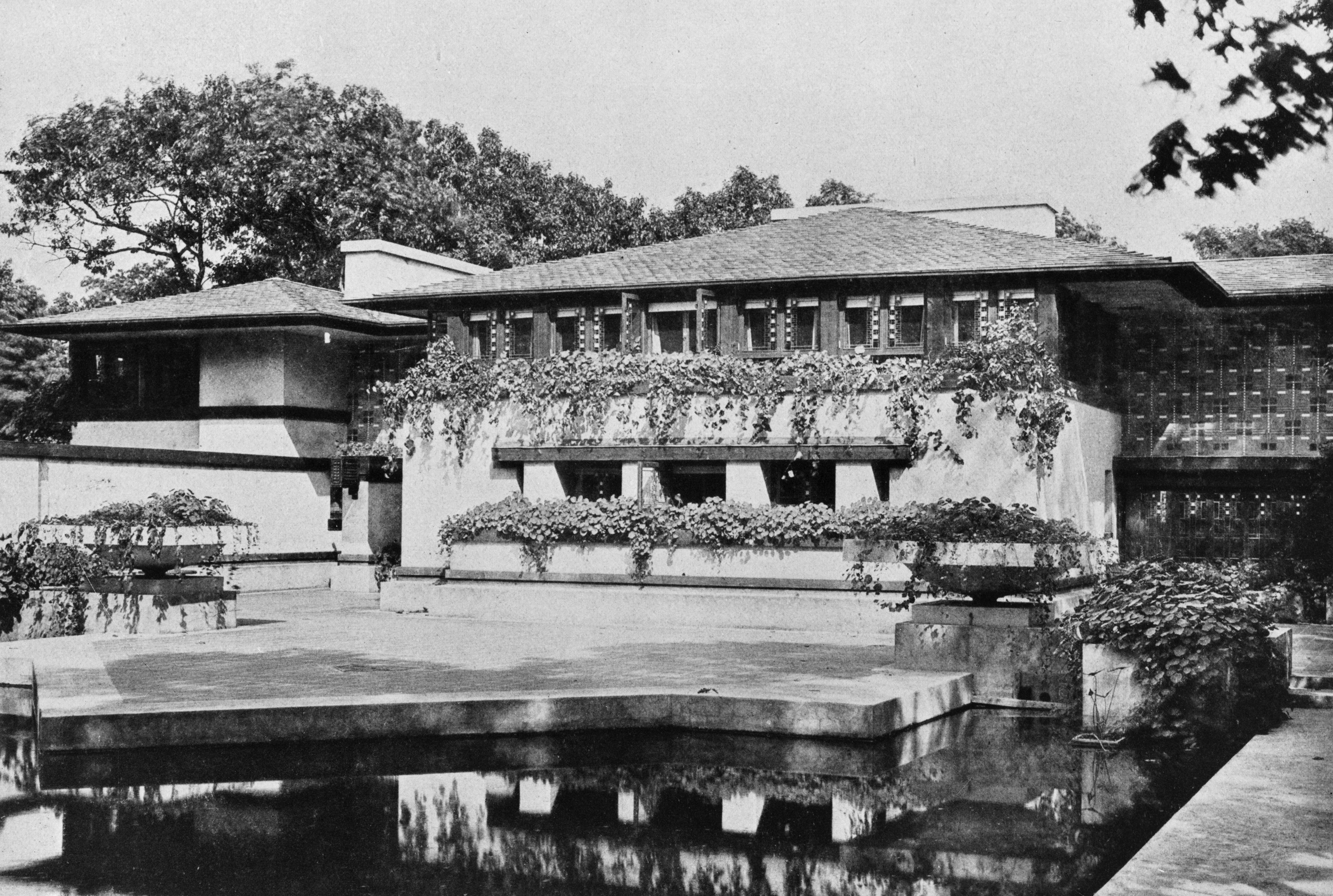
The north wing (now the northern residence) seen from near its reflecting pool

The Coonley family moved to Rosedale in Washington, D.C., in 1917, after Avery Coonley accepted a position on Christian Science's publications committee. Peter Kroehler, founder of the furniture manufacturing firm Kroehler Manufacturing Company, bought the house from the Coonleys. Kroehler moved into the house with his wife Grace Hubert and their son Kenneth in 1921. He lived there for the rest of his life. During Kroehler's occupancy, the gardens were sometimes exhibited to the public.

Kroehler died in August 1950. The house was sold in 1951 or 1952 to the architect and developer Arnold Skow, who paid $250,000. (Note: Equivalent to $2,364,000 in 2024) Skow threatened to raze the buildings and construct ranch homes and two-story housing on the estate. Married couple Carolyn and James Howlett convinced Skow to subdivide the estate into several residences, rather than destroying the estate. Carolyn was familiar with Wright, having seen him at the Chicago Art Institute; she had once stayed over at Wright's Taliesin studio. The Howlett family subsequently agreed to buy the carriage house in 1953, paying $15,000. (Note: Equivalent to $142,000 in 2024)

Carolyn later recalled that it took four years before Skow backed down from his original plans. Skow was finally convinced to change his plans after the Howlett family hired him to renovate the carriage house; according to Carolyn, Skow had come to learn that the house "was really newer than it was old". The Howletts spent a year renovating the carriage house, which they furnished with Wright-inspired decorations. James Howlett convinced his employer, Hearst Communications, to publish an article of the house in one of its publications, House Beautiful magazine; eight of the magazine's editors made frequent trips to the estate. Skow built five two-story houses around the estate; four of these houses were built west of the existing buildings, while the fifth occupied part of the garden at the northeastern corner. Peter E. Riley, a young architect working with a local firm, designed the modifications to the house. A firewall was installed in the main house, splitting it into two portions; the public–living wings and the bedroom wing respectively became the northern and southern residences.

=== 1960s to 1990s ===
By the late 20th century, Wright's fame attracted visitors to the Coonley House. When the house was designated a National Historic Landmark in 1970, a writer for the Riverside–Brookfield Landmark wrote that "no one wanted the [landmark designation] plaque to be affixed to their structure" because of the attention the house elicited. In 1974, the Illinois Department of Conservation requested $15,522 (Note: Equivalent to $77,000 in 2024) in federal preservation funding to renovate the swimming pool and some of the main mansion's details. The house was eligible for these funds because it was a National Historic Landmark, but it would have to be opened to the public annually if such a grant were approved. The Northeastern Illinois Planning Commission approved the grant, which was used only for the Bloomingbank Road residence.

The pharmacist Nicholas Sahlas bought the main house's Bloomingbank Road residence in the late 1970s and restored it over 18 months. At the time, the other residence was owned by James L. Dublinski. Just after Sahlas finished renovating his residence, the house caught fire in June 1978, causing over $100,000 in damage. (Note: Equivalent to $376,000 in 2024) Sahlas's portion of the house was the most severely damaged, with collapsed walls in one room and fire damage in several others, although the fire also damaged two of Dublinski's rooms. Afterward, Sahlas promised to renovate his portion of the house again; these renovations took another 18 months. During the 1980s, the house underwent additional renovations.

The house continued to attract unsolicited visitors. Sahlas said in 1987 that he pretended to be a caretaker when people asked him for tours, and his wife Mary said that tourists frequently pressed their faces to the windows so they could see inside the house. In other cases, strangers came to measure the roof tiles, and one stranger, refused permission to enter the house, tried to have the Sahlases' son take pictures of the interior. By 1996, both portions of the main house were for sale; the northern residence was listed for about $1.3 million, while the southern residence was listed for about $950,000. There was talk of selling both residences to a single buyer who could reunite them, as both residences had never been simultaneously placed for sale. The listing for the northern residence was withdrawn for sale in 1997, even as its owner remained interested in selling. The southern residence's selling price was repeatedly lowered until that residence was sold in 1999 for $679,000.

=== 2000s to present ===
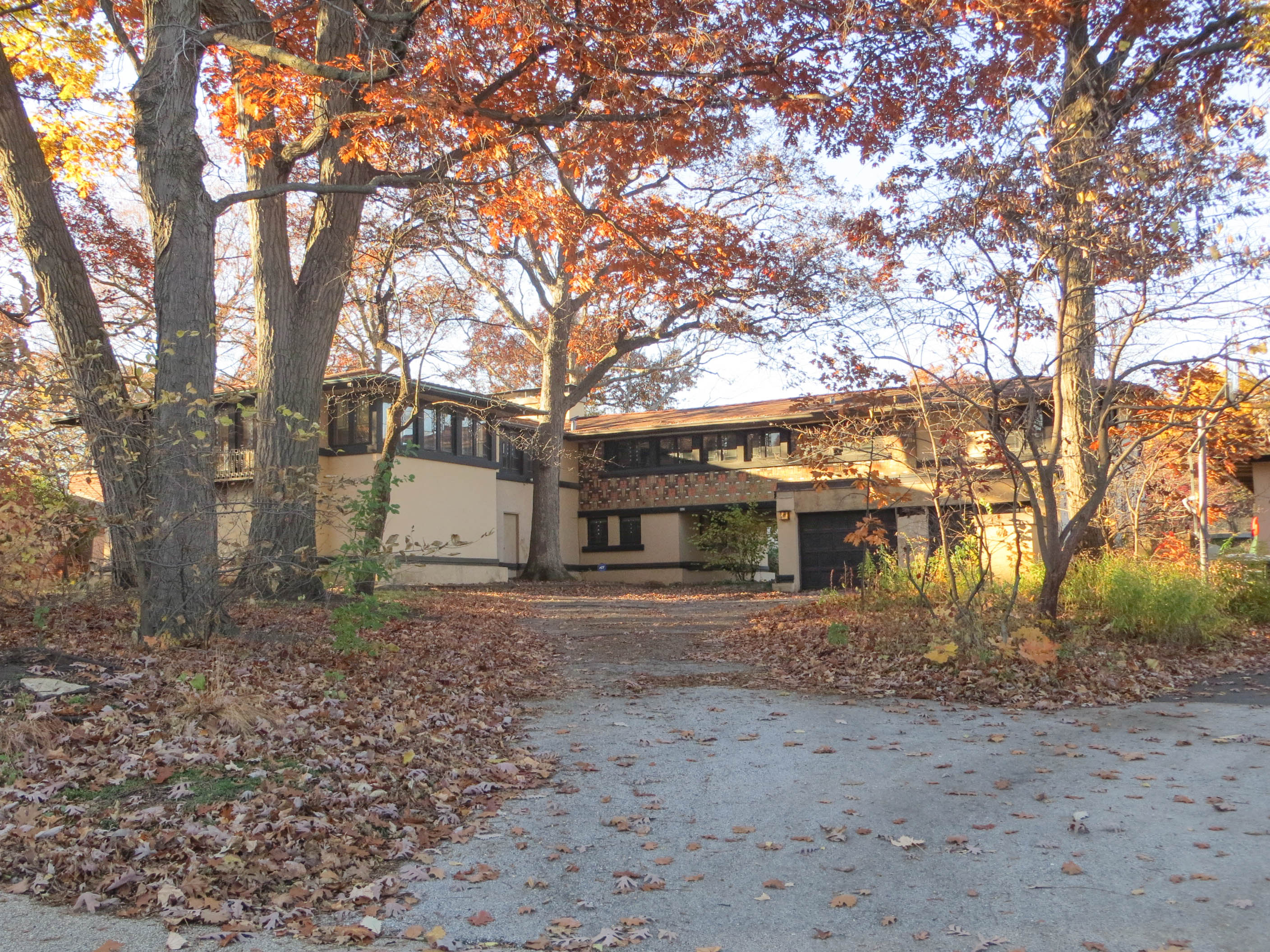
The southern residence, seen from Scottswood Road

Dean Eastman, the former director of the Argonne National Laboratory, acquired the main house's northern residence in May 2000 for $975,000. He and his wife Ella Mae then renovated that residence. At the time, the house was deteriorating, and the interior had been painted white. The other half of the main house was acquired that December by the Frank Lloyd Wright Building Conservancy. The Eastmans renovated the northern residence over the next four years. They restored a mural that had been almost completely destroyed, and they also restored Jensen's original landscape design. The Eastman family's renovation received preservation awards from Landmarks Illinois, the Wright Building Conservancy, and the Gifford Park Association. The southern residence, on Scottswood Road, was owned by Robert Erickson, who sold 26 of the living- and dining-room windows to the Wright Building Conservancy for $390,000 in 2003.

Eastman became acquainted with Carolyn Howlett, who had lived in the carriage house for a half-century. By then, the carriage house's roof was in danger of collapsing. In 2004, the executor of Howlett's estate, the Cook County Public Guardian's office, proposed replacing the carriage house's tile roof, prompting objections from preservationists. Since Howlett could not afford to replicate the original roof to precise specifications, which could cost up to $250,000, the public guardian proposed installing an asphalt roof for $14,000. Privately-owned houses could be sold to nonprofit organizations to increase the likelihood of receiving preservation funding, but this was not possible with the public guardian in control of the house. Several nonprofit organizations had expressed interest in providing funds for the carriage house, but they were legally barred from providing funds to individuals, such as Howlett. The public guardian's office agreed in September 2005 to sell the carriage house to Eastman for an estimated $360,000; Eastman agreed to let Howlett continue living in the carriage house. Howlett died in December 2005, and the next year, the Eastmans began renovating the carriage house.

The northern residence was placed on sale in 2010, and the Eastmans moved into the carriage house. The southern residence was being marketed simultaneously, again prompting discussions that both halves of the main house could be sold to a single buyer. In 2014, vandals broke into the vacant southern residence, breaking a window, spraying graffiti on the walls, and leaving waste in the residence. At the time, the southern residence had substantial water damage. The next year, the Frank Lloyd Wright Trust began including the Coonley House in its annual "housewalk" of Wright-designed homes. The southern residence was also sold for $355,000 in 2015 to married couple John Farneda and Stephanus "Fanie" Greeff, who renovated it. For their renovation, Farneda and Greeff received an award from the Frederick Law Olmsted Society. After Farneda's death, Greeff won the Wright Spirit Award from the Wright Building Conservancy.

Eastman still owned the Bloomingbank Road residence when he died in 2018. The northern residence was finally sold in 2019 for $1.15 million; the buyers, Richard Marritt and Steven Oldham, spent the next several years repairing their portion of the house. In the 2020s, Greeff and the Marritt–Oldham family continued to host guests for regular events and annual housewalk tours.

== Architecture ==
South and north elevation drawings

The Coonley Estate consists of three distinct structures: the main house, carriage house (including garage–stable and coachman's residence), and gardener's cottage. There is a servant quarters attached to the main house. A fourth structure was built on the northeast part of the garden when the estate was split up. The Coonley House was one of six major residential commissions Wright executed in the 1900s, along with the Dana, Little, Martin, Robie, and Willits houses.

=== Main house ===
==== Exterior ====
The mansion is two stories high, with the ground story functioning as a raised basement. Wright had previously used a raised basement in several other houses, such as the Husser, Heurtley, Thomas, and Tomek houses. The house has a flat concrete foundation. It exhibits many design details common to Wright's Prairie-style houses, such as low roofs and windows wrapping around corners, though one later source described the building as being arranged in a Spanish style. Wright used wrought iron, ceramic tile, concrete, bronze, and electroplated glass in the exterior design. The facade is mostly made of creamy-tan or white stucco plaster, along with wood trim. Its decorations are mostly arranged horizontally.

The house's entrance is at ground level, concealed through the driveway. The first (upper) story is raised one floor above ground, and is decorated with an orange, gold, and bronze-tinted frieze. The upper story also has a tile mosaic with a tulip motif, which consists of scored grids of textured square tiles, surrounded by wood trim. Each tulip decoration consists of inscribed lines depicting roots; white squares depicting leaves and stems; and larger pink squares depicting petals on top. Wright also incorporated other nature-based motifs, such as locust trees and ferns, into the exterior design to complement the landscape and hardscape features.

The frieze is interspersed with horizontal ribbons of windows, which are made of multicolored art glass. The panes are arranged in 15 patterns and were electroplated to create metal strips fastening them together. The windows themselves are arranged as casements that open outward, since Wright considered traditional sash windows (which slide vertically) to be akin to a guillotine. When the house was built, Wright produced dozens of spare windows in case any of them needed to be replaced. Above are shallow pitched roofs, which protrude from the facade. The roofs are covered with russet-tinted terracotta tiles. Under the roof are wooden beams, with indented bronze end-plates for weatherproofing. Under the overhanging roof is an observation seat facing the garden.

The U-shaped ground plan is based on the pinwheel plan commonly used by Wright, with arms extending off a central core, except that the Coonley House consists of back-to-back-pinwheels. The use of interconnected yet distinct pavilions was also inspired by the layout of Japanese palaces, and, within the village of Riverside, the concept of standalone pavilions had previously been used in William Le Baron Jenney's Riverside Hotel. Wright said this would allow the building to receive "light and air on three sides" while maintaining a cohesive design. The irregular, asymmetrical layout is centered on the landscape, rather than on any specific architectural feature. The Coonley House is the first example in Wright's work of a zoned plan, with bedroom and public–living wings extending off it. The public wing (containing communal spaces such as the dining room) is situated in the north, while the bedroom pavilion is a cruciform structure extending to the south. The central bar of the U, connecting these two pavilions, runs along the western side of the site.

==== Interior ====
Diagram of the Coonley House's floor layout, as seen from an eastward-facing perspective (i.e. with north at left). The southern (bedroom wing) residence is at lower right. The northern (dining wing) residence is at lower left.

The interiors are generally arranged around a series of square modules. It is cited as spanning 10,000 square feet (930 m^{2}), (Note: Another source gives a figure of 9,000 square feet (840 m^{2}).) although the wings have since been split into separate residences on adjacent land lots. Two modern-day residences share the original house's space. The northern residence, at 281 Bloomingbank Road, occupies the public and living wings. It spans about 6,000 square feet (560 m^{2}), with either four or five bedrooms. The remaining 4,000 square feet (370 m^{2}) is in the southern residence, at 300 Scottswood Road, which occupies the former bedroom wing. The southern residence itself has three bedrooms. Both residences have three and a half bathrooms, out of a total of 11 rooms. (Note: The northern residence is sometimes described as having 12 rooms.)

Because of the angular arrangement of the wings, the interior spaces were originally accessed through a series of right-angled turns, similar to Wright's earlier Cheney House. The lower story originally contained only one of the primary rooms, a central playroom. The rest of the lower story is divided into three sections by the house's primary driveway, which passes north–south under both the bedroom and public–living wings. The house's other primary rooms are on the upper story. The rooms and general layout generally remain intact, despite the mansion having been divided in two.

Wright designed furnishings for the house, such as carpets, napkins, cantilevered dressers, and Queene Coonley's dresses. These objects have included oak-spindle chairs with backs of different heights. George Mann Niedecken designed some of the furnishings. The original objects in the house have long since been dispersed. By the time Skow acquired the Coonley House in the 1950s, the house included furniture, a piano, fabrics, carpets, lamps, and accessories manufactured by other firms.

===== Public–living section =====
At the lower story, a small porte-cochère leads from the driveway into the entrance hall. A short flight of three steps ascends to a landing next to the playroom. The playroom's eastern wall has an alcove with a central fireplace, along with wood-slatted screens and inglenook benches on either side. At each end of this wall are piers, behind which were originally stairs to the upper level, though one stair has been removed. The other three sides have a U-shaped wall with large piers on either side; the terrace and pool extend behind the west wall. The rest of the ground floor has storage and utility areas. The basement spaces are part of the Bloomingbank Road (northern) residence.

At the northwest corner of the house's upper story, directly above the playroom, is the living room. The eastern wall of the living room, facing the courtyard, has a fireplace, originally flanked by the playroom staircases. Bookcases are installed in niches created between the staircases and fireplace. Originally, there was a mural above the fireplace depicting a birch forest, measuring 28 feet (8.5 m) wide. Designed by Niedecken, this mural has been almost entirely painted over. On the other three walls of the living room, casement art-glass windows with geometric patterns occupy the upper two-thirds of the wall. Three of the original windows have since been replaced with French doors, which retain the original art glass; these overlook the reflecting pool. The living room has a sloped wood ceiling, which extends into an adjacent hallway. Skylights are placed in the ceiling above the staircases.

The narrow hallway, leading from the living room, runs along the inner (east) edge of the house. The hall has skylights made of leaded glass, which were intended to draw visitors' focus past the living room toward the stairs and hall. The public section also includes the original dining room, kitchen, servant rooms, and other service functions. The rooms were intended to flow into one another and were decorated in various shades of brown and tan. The dining room is in a wing extending northward from the house's northwest corner. The dining and living rooms originally had a shared carpet, which according to the historian Robert McCarter "reinforce[d] the dynamism of the built-in elements". The original kitchen sat over the driveway, allowing servants to observe everyone coming and going through the driveway.

Queene Coonley had a separate office off the living room where she saw patients, connected to the rest of the house by a corridor. For privacy, the office had two stairways: one each for patients entering and leaving.

===== Other sections =====
The servants' quarters are located next to the main house's kitchen, extending eastward from the house's northwest corner. Only the upper floor is connected to the rest of the house. The servants' quarters has stucco walls with art glass windows and wood boards. The massing rises one story above the basement, and its hip roof has a protruding chimney. Inside, the upper level originally contained a servants' general room, three servants' bedrooms, and a stair. The upper floor has since been turned into a workshop and master suite, while the lower level has been converted to a wine cellar.

The house's hallway had a slight jog at the boundary between the public–living and bedroom sections. The bedroom wing was originally configured as a study and five bedrooms. On the western side of the hall are three rooms, which were originally the study, spare bedroom, and child's bedroom from north to south. The master bedroom, at the south end of the bedroom wing, has a dressing room extending slightly west and was supposed to have a porch. Opposite the dressing room, extending to the east, is another wing with two additional rooms (formerly guest bedrooms), accessed by a hall on their north side. When the house was subdivided, all the bedrooms became part of the southern residence, but the study remained part of the northern residence.

=== Other buildings ===
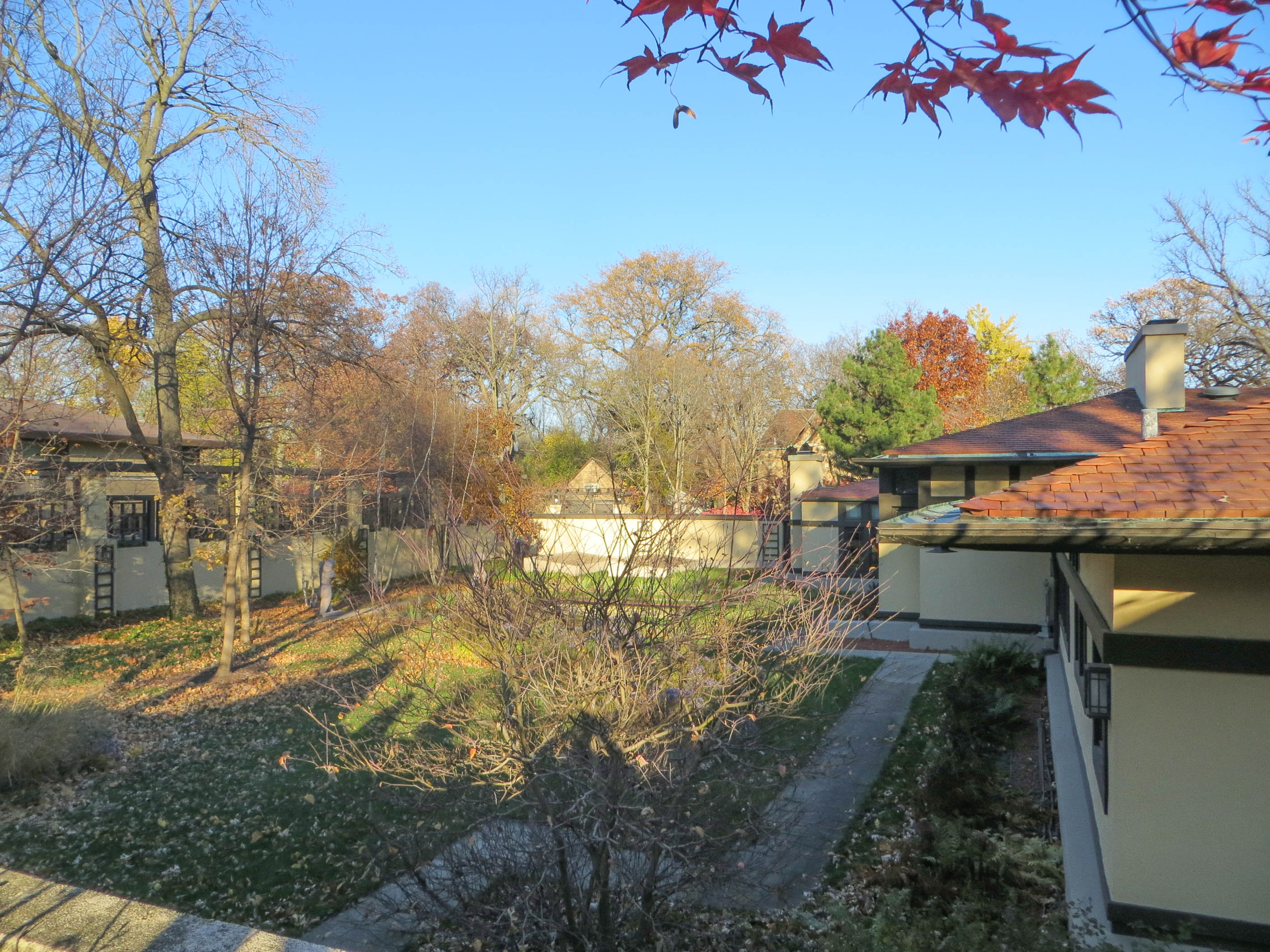
View of the estate's other buildings

A carriage house (comprising a garage–stable and chauffeur's house) and gardener's cottage are also part of the estate. They have been split off as separate residences, though they are built in similar styles. The carriage house is on the northern side of the service driveway that extends east of the main house. The carriage house has a stucco facade, dark wood boards, and a protruding hipped roof with a chimney. Its windows wrap around the corners, and it has four wings, each opening onto a different part of the garden. There are three horse stalls inside the stable, in addition to a garage above the driveway. The chauffeur's house is west of the stalls, with a main room and a studio. East of the chauffeur's house are two rooms. Inside the carriage house are glass and mosaic decorations, along with a private interior garden (the only one in the estate).

The gardener's cottage, dating from 1911–1913, was designed by William Eugene Drummond, one of Wright's students. It is located south of the service driveway. The exterior is one story high, with a stucco facade, dark wood boards, art glass windows, and a protruding hipped roof with a chimney to the east. Measuring about 800 square feet (74 m^{2}), the gardener's cottage has a porch at the north end, a veranda to the south, and exterior stairs. Inside are a living room, kitchen, and two bedrooms.

== Impact and legacy ==
=== Reception ===
Wright called the main house "the most successful of my houses...", and he considered the living room his best such work for the time. The architectural writer Henry-Russell Hitchcock wrote that the Coonley House "offers a quite different and much more extended plan" compared with Wright's earlier work. The plan was not universally liked; the Coonleys' daughter Elizabeth recalled that "the wife of one man wouldn't let him go by the house because it made him sick".

Elizabeth Gordon, editor of House Beautiful magazine, said in 1955 that "of the fine homes I have ever seen, I would like to have reserved the word great for the Coonley house", citing it as a great work of art. Gordon contrasted the house with others that were "little stage settings or scene paintings ... notion bazaars or junk shops". A writer for Historic Preservation magazine wrote in 1973 that the Coonley House's distinct design had been made possible by the landscape design of Riverside itself, which had been intended to "make each man's house 'more beautiful in its surroundings'". The architectural historian Ira J. Bach described the house as being among "the very best of Frank Lloyd Wright's work". Robert McCarter, another Wright biographer, conversely felt that the house lacked "the geometrical purity and rigorous order" of Wright's other Prairie-style work. The historian Grant Manson wrote that the quality of the design derived from the good relationship between architect and client, saying that "the word 'harmonious' constantly comes to mind in connection with the Coonley house".

After the Coonley House was built, more Prairie-style houses were developed in the suburbs of Chicago, Wright also continued to design houses with high living-room ceilings, as he had done at the Coonley House. Gordon wrote that some features, such as the stucco frieze, were just beginning to gain popularity decades after Wright had used them. Brendan Gill, one of Wright's biographers, wrote in 1987 that the Coonley House's design presaged Wright's more famous Fallingwater, Taliesin West, and Wingspread designs.

=== Objects, exhibits, and landmark designations ===
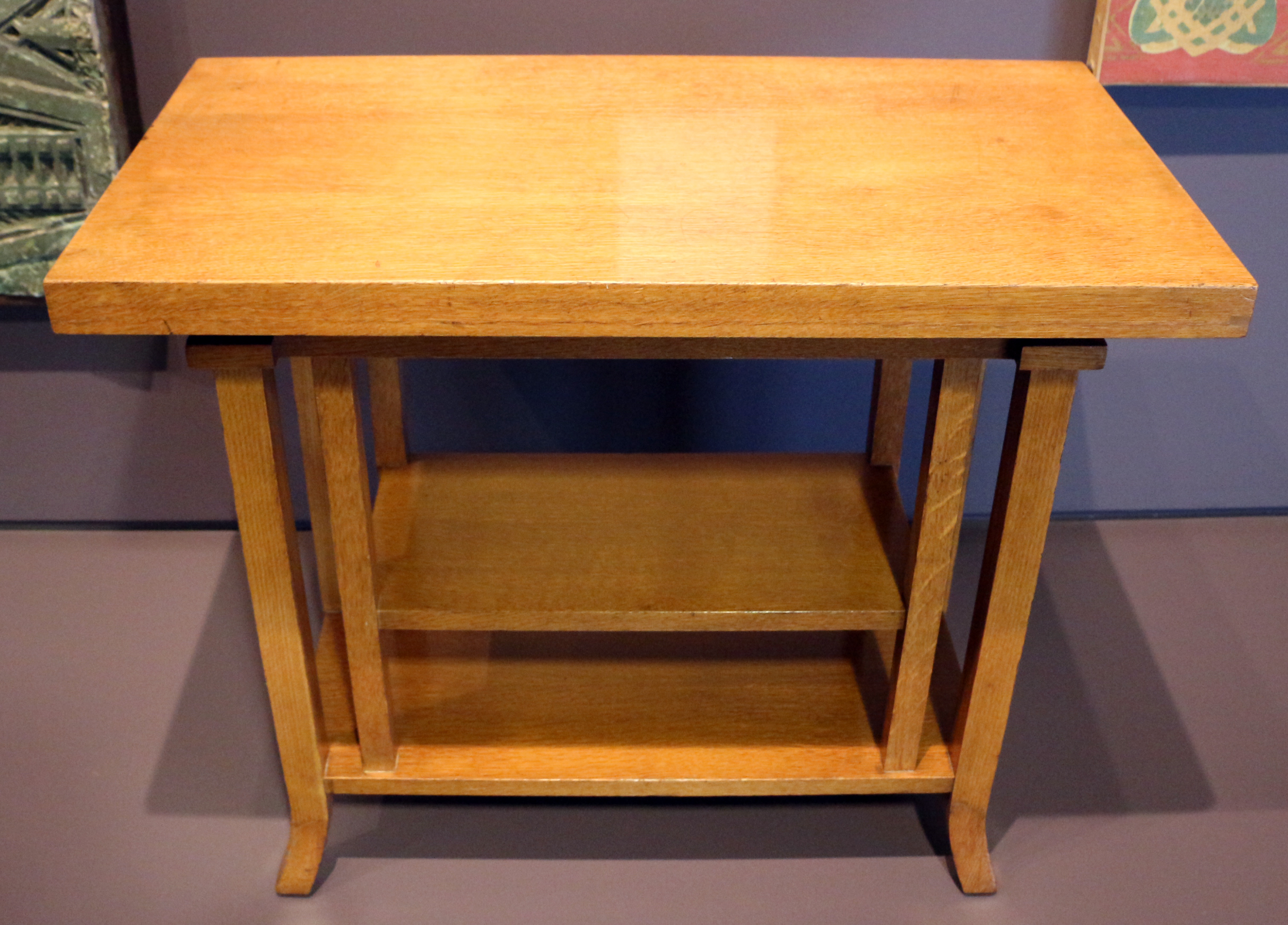
A piece of original furniture exhibited in a museum

Some objects from the house have been dispersed over the years. These have included a pair of wood-framed art glass doors sold at auction, an oak console table sold to Barbra Streisand, and several pieces sold through the Struve Gallery. Many of the spare windows have been acquired by collectors. In addition, a sewing table has been displayed at the Chicago Historical Society, and an art glass window is permanently installed in the American wing of the Metropolitan Museum of Art's main building. Merchandise inspired by the house's design elements, including two styles of drapery panels, has been sold. The house has been detailed in museum exhibits as well, such as a 1995 showcase of Wright's work at the Design Museum in London.

When the Coonley House was declared a National Historic Landmark (NHL) in 1970, the carriage house and main house were included in the designation. It is one of two Wright-designed residences in Riverside designated as NHLs, the other being the Tomek House; one source described the Coonley and Tomek houses as "the chief glories of Riverside". A plaque commemorating the designation is installed on a small stone in a nearby park. (Note: Specifically, across Scottswood Road from the southern residence.) The estate is a contributing property to the Riverside Historic District, itself designated as a National Historic Landmark District. The buildings were all listed in a 1972 survey conducted by the Illinois Department of Conservation. The complex is also a local landmark, a designation granted in 1993. In granting the local landmark designation, the village government said the estate was "established and familiar visual feature in the village".

== See also ==
- List of Frank Lloyd Wright works
- The Avery Coonley School
- List of National Historic Landmarks in Illinois
- National Register of Historic Places listings in Cook County, Illinois
