= Rosedale (Washington, D.C.) =

Historic house in Washington, D.C., United States

- U.S. National Register of Historic Places
- U.S. Historic district – Contributing property
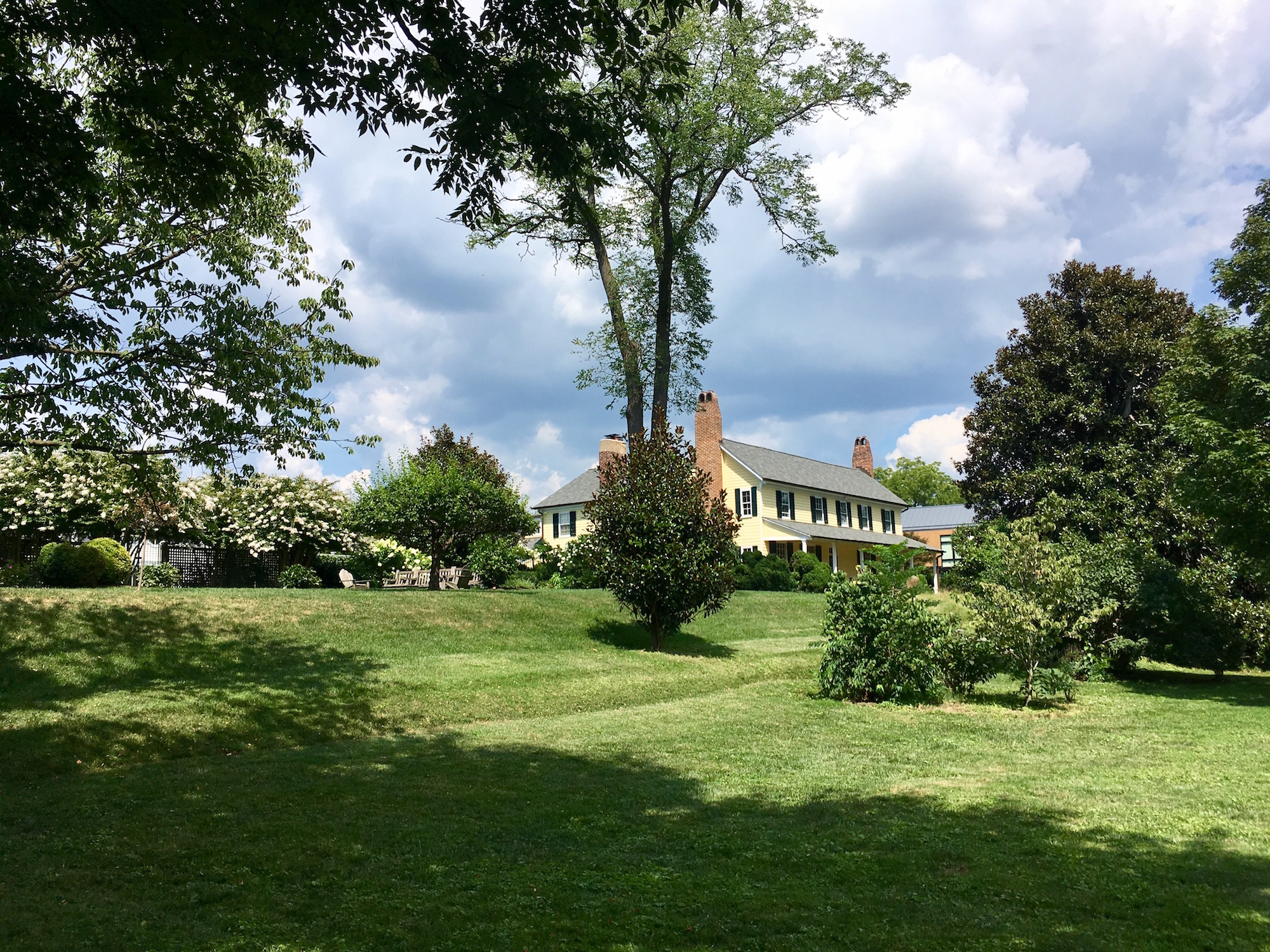
- Rosedale (Pretty Prospects) farmhouse and grounds (2017)

- Location within the District of Columbia Location within the United States
- Location: 3501 Newark Street, N.W., Washington, District of Columbia
- Coordinates: 38°56′7″N 77°4′9″W
- Built: ca. 1740, 1793
- Part of: Cleveland Park Historic District (ID870000628)
- NRHP reference No.: 73002115
- Added to NRHP: May 08, 1973

Rosedale (also known as Pretty Prospects, the Uriah Forrest House, and the Coonley Estate) is an historic home and grounds at 3501 Newark Street, Northwest, Washington, D.C., in the Cleveland Park Historic District. The property is a National Register of Historic Places and District of Columbia landmark.

== History ==
The Rosedale Farmhouse was built in 1793 by Revolutionary War Colonel Uriah Forrest. A small stone cottage constructed in 1740 was incorporated into the house, making Rosedale the oldest surviving house in what is now Washington, DC. The house is set in terraced grounds that are the last remnant of an estate that once encompassed all of what is now Cleveland Park.

Rosedale was owned by Forrest descendants until 1920. That year, it was purchased by Queene Coonley, who along with her late husband Avery Coonley had owned the Frank Lloyd Wright-designed Coonley House in Riverside, Illinois. The Coonleys had rented the house beginning in 1917.

The house was rented to Undersecretary of State William Phillips in 1933, and to John N. Irwin, II in 1959. It was a faculty residence for the National Cathedral School. In 1977, the youth exchange organization Youth For Understanding bought the premises. YFU sold Rosedale to The Rosedale Conservancy, a local trust, in 2002. A renovation project was carried out by Muse Architects in that year.

Rosedale is listed on the National Register of Historic Places, and is a contributing property to the Cleveland Park Historic District.

== See also ==
- National Register of Historic Places listings in Washington, D.C.
