= Avery Coonley School =

School in Downers Grove, Illinois, US

The Avery Coonley School
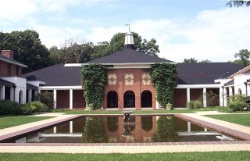

Location
- 1400 Maple Avenue; Downers Grove, Illinois; United States; 41.788°N 88.020°W

Information
- School type: Private; Gifted; Day
- Motto: "Onward and Upward"
- Established: 1906
- NCES School ID: 02024267
- Head of school: Nancy Nassr
- Grades: Preschool–8
- Gender: Coed
- Age range: 3–14
- Enrollment: 338 (2023)
- Campus size: 11 acres (4.5 ha)
- Campus type: Suburban
- Colors: Orange and blue
- Mascot: Fightin' Seahorse
- Accreditation: North Central Association
- Affiliation: National Association of Independent Schools
- Website: www.averycoonley.org
- Coonley, Avery, School
- U.S. National Register of Historic Places
- Location within Illinois Location within the United States
- Location: 1400 Maple Ave., Downers Grove, Illinois
- Area: 10.5 acres (4.2 ha)
- Built: 1929
- Architects: Waldron Faulkner; Hamilton, Fellows & Nedved, et al.
- Architectural style: Prairie School
- NRHP reference No.: 07000477
- Added to NRHP: August 8, 2007

The Avery Coonley School (ACS), commonly called Avery Coonley, is an independent, coeducational day school serving academically gifted students in preschool through eighth grade (approximately ages 3 to 14), and is located in Downers Grove, DuPage County, Illinois. The school was founded in 1906 to promote the progressive educational theories developed by John Dewey and other turn-of-the-20th-century philosophers, and was a nationally recognized model for progressive education well into the 1940s. From 1943 to 1965, Avery Coonley was part of the National College of Education (now National Louis University), serving as a living laboratory for teacher training.

The school moved to Downers Grove in 1916 and became the Avery Coonley School in 1929, with a new 10.45-acre (4.23 ha) campus designed in the Prairie and Arts and Crafts styles, landscaped by Jens Jensen. Avery Coonley was added to the National Register of Historic Places in 2007.

== History ==
=== Founding and Cottage School (1906–1916) ===
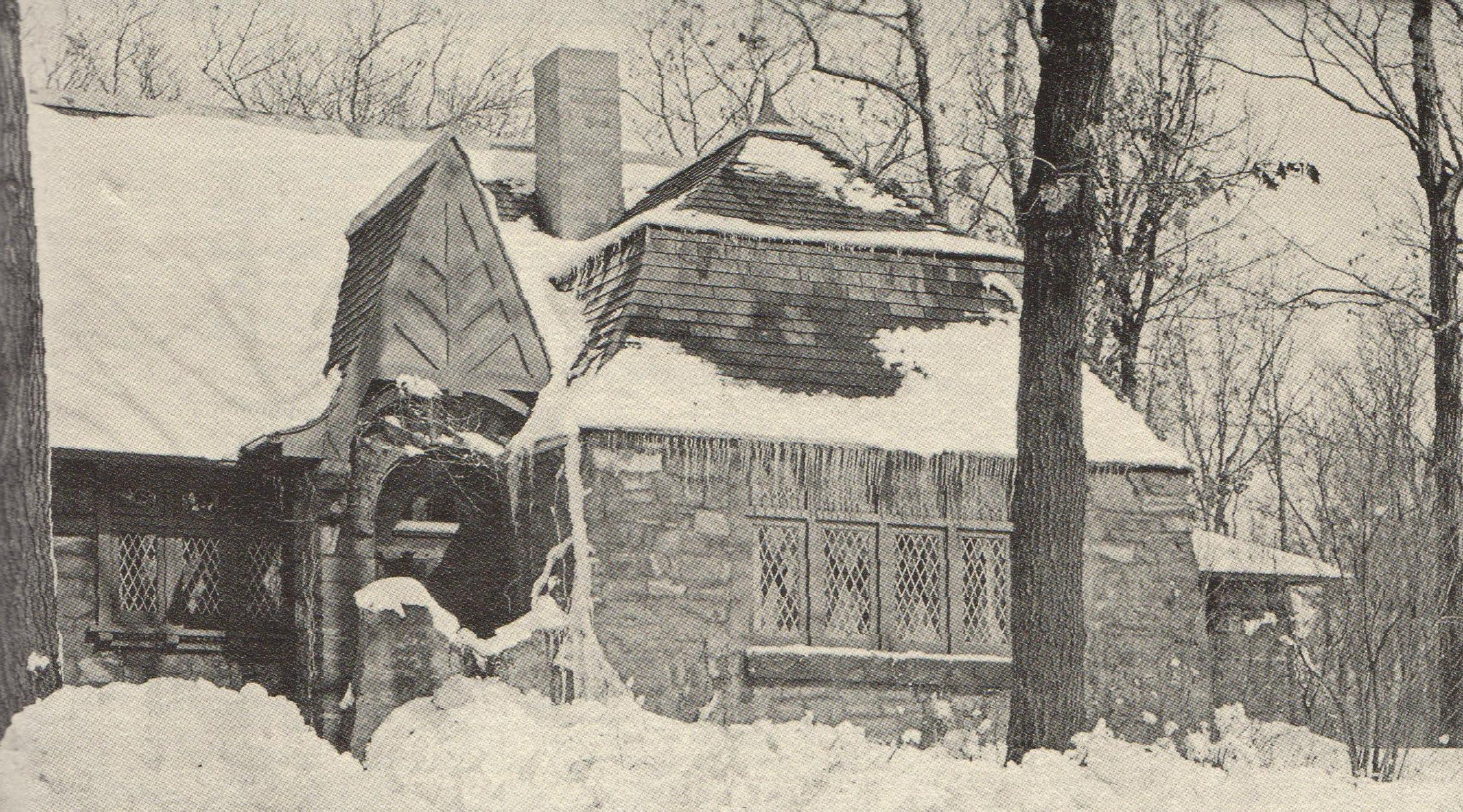
The Cottage on the Coonley Estate, first home of the Avery Coonley School. Designed by Charles Whittlesey in 1894, it later became a private residence.

In 1906, Queene Ferry Coonley, wife of wealthy Riverside industrialist and publisher Avery Coonley, decided to start a kindergarten program to allow children younger than five years old to attend. Queene Coonley was trained as a social worker and kindergarten teacher at the Detroit Normal School (now Wayne State University) and was impressed by the theories of Friedrich Fröbel, who believed children's early education should be an extension of their lives at home.

Coonley persuaded the director of the Riverside program, Lucia Burton Morse, and her assistant, Charlotte Krum, to help launch a new school. Their progressive views on education emphasized an individualized approach to education and children learning from experience and social interaction. Coonley described the new school as "a Children's Community. Its purpose was not so much to teach what others had thought or grown-ups had done, but for the children themselves to do something."

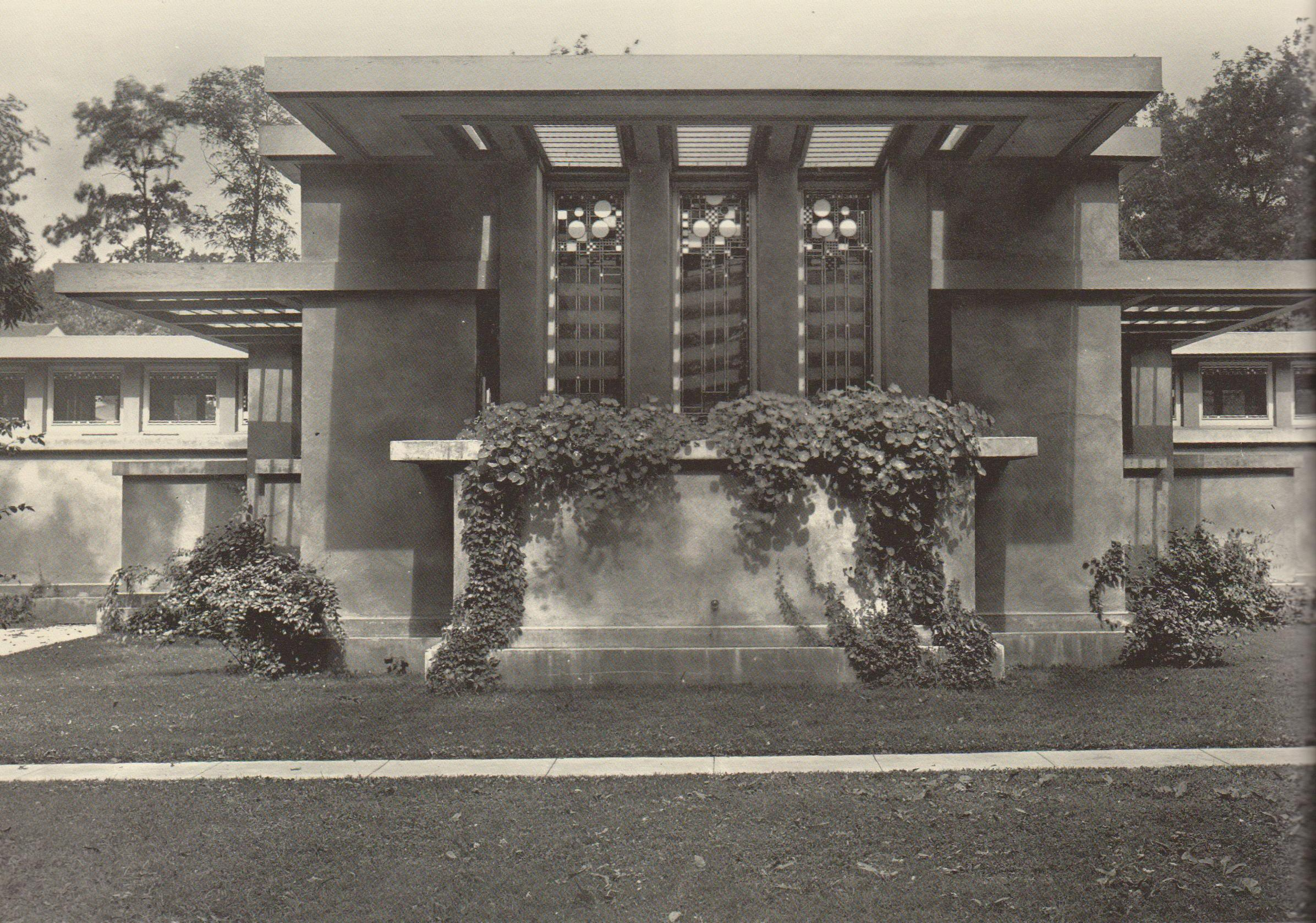
The Coonley Playhouse, with its signature "kinder-symphony" windows, was built by Frank Lloyd Wright to house the Cottage School in 1912. It has been nominated as a National Historic Landmark.

A small cottage on the Coonley estate served as the first school building, and the first name was The Cottage School. The designer was Charles Whittlesey. The estate's main building, the Avery Coonley House, designed by Frank Lloyd Wright, is now a National Historic Landmark. A new building was completed in 1912 and became known as the Coonley Playhouse. It featured colored art glass windows, flags, balloons, and confetti in what Wright referred to as a "kinder-symphony". Some have claimed that they belong to Wright's most famous windows.

The Cottage School was free to all students, and was supported both by Coonley's own resources and funds raised by the Kindergarten Education Association. In 1915, John Dewey and his daughter Evelyn featured the Cottage School in their book, The Schools of To-Morrow, which examined how progressive schools around the country put new educational ideas into action. The Deweys considered the Cottage School to be an example of training in good citizenship and approved of its mock elections, self-government, and public service.

=== Junior Elementary School (1916–1929) ===
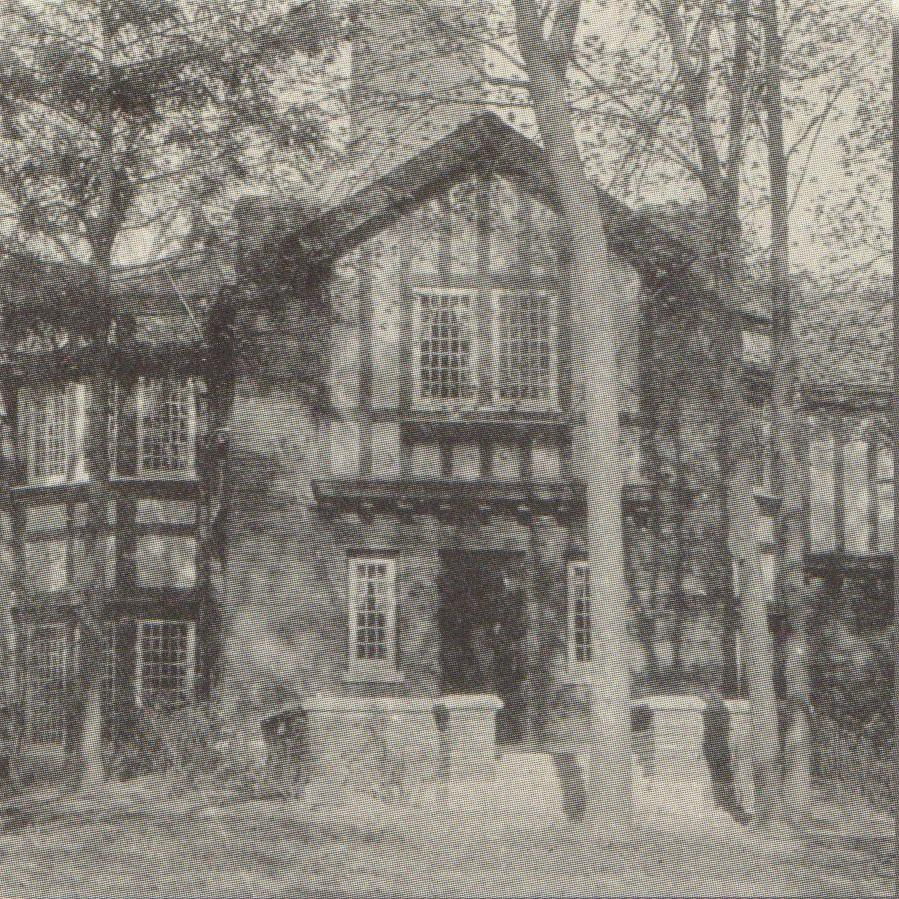
The Junior Elementary School in Downers Grove. The building was demolished in 1944 and the land was sold. It was later donated to create what would become Fishel Park.

At the same time the Playhouse was built, Coonley agreed to build a kindergarten in the nearby town of Downers Grove, which did not have a public school. Coonley purchased land on Grove Street and commissioned the architectural firm of Perkins, Fellows & Hamilton to design the building. The school, led by Lucia Morse, was launched as the Kindergarten Extension Association School in 1912. In 1916, the Cottage School was closed and a first grade program was launched at the Downers Grove kindergarten, which was renamed the Junior Elementary School. To accommodate older students, a second grade class was added in 1920 for students around seven years old, a third grade in 1926 for eight-year-olds, and a fourth grade for nine-year-old students shortly thereafter.

The Coonleys moved to Washington, D.C., in 1916. Morse looked after the day-to-day direction of the school. Teachers at the Junior Elementary School were encouraged to find a new way of relating to students, allowing them more freedom. Coonley recalled that "boys and girls cooked, boys and girls did carpenter work, boys and girls took an equal part in all matters of government." Students re-enacted history and literature, composed music, and spent time outdoors. In 1924, Coonley and Morse helped found a journal entitled Progressive Education, in which they published their own practical experiences at the school and articles by educational theorists including John Dewey. It became the leading professional journal of the progressive education movement and was published until 1957.

=== Avery Coonley School (1929–1960s) ===
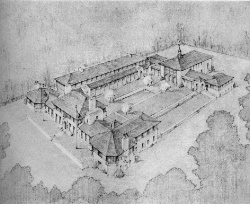
Architectural sketch of The Avery Coonley School campus by Waldron Faulkner. Faulkner would later become one of the principal architects for the campus of George Washington University in Washington, D.C.

Coonley chose a wooded tract in Downers Grove, adjacent to the Maple Grove Forest Preserve, as the site for the new building, and her son-in-law, Waldron Faulkner, was the architect of the new building project. Over one hundred students attended school in the opened building on September 30, 1929, and it was renamed The Avery Coonley School, in honor of Coonley's late husband, who had died in 1920. Coonley chose as a mascot a seahorse, a unique creature who was also a member of a larger community. The seahorse swims upright, from which derives the school motto: "Onward and Upward".

Progressive education, a pedagogy promoting learning through real-life experiences, was at its zenith in the United States in the 1920s and 30s, and the Avery Coonley School was a widely known model of these theories in action. Avery Coonley was featured regularly in Progressive Education and other professional journals, and in 1938, the editor of Progressive Education, Gertrude Hartman, published a profile of the Avery Coonley School in her book Finding Wisdom: Chronicles of a School of Today. She noted, "[v]isitors from all parts of the United States and from foreign countries [came] to see the school—sometimes as many as thirty in a day."

The book described the progress of the students from their first year of kindergarten through their ten years of study, providing photos, stories, and examples of students' work. Finding Wisdom became a classic in the education field and solidified the Avery Coonley School's national reputation as a model of progressive education.

Morse died in 1940, after 34 years as director, and several years went by without a strong local leadership. To ensure a sounder footing for the future, Coonley merged Avery Coonley with the National College of Education (NCE, formerly the Chicago Kindergarten College and now National Louis University) in Evanston, Illinois, in 1943. The two institutions had close ties dating back to Morse's Kindergarten College days, and the arrangement took advantage of the NCE's financial and teaching resources while Avery Coonley provided a living laboratory for teacher training and educational research. The school continued offering the curriculum for which it had become known.

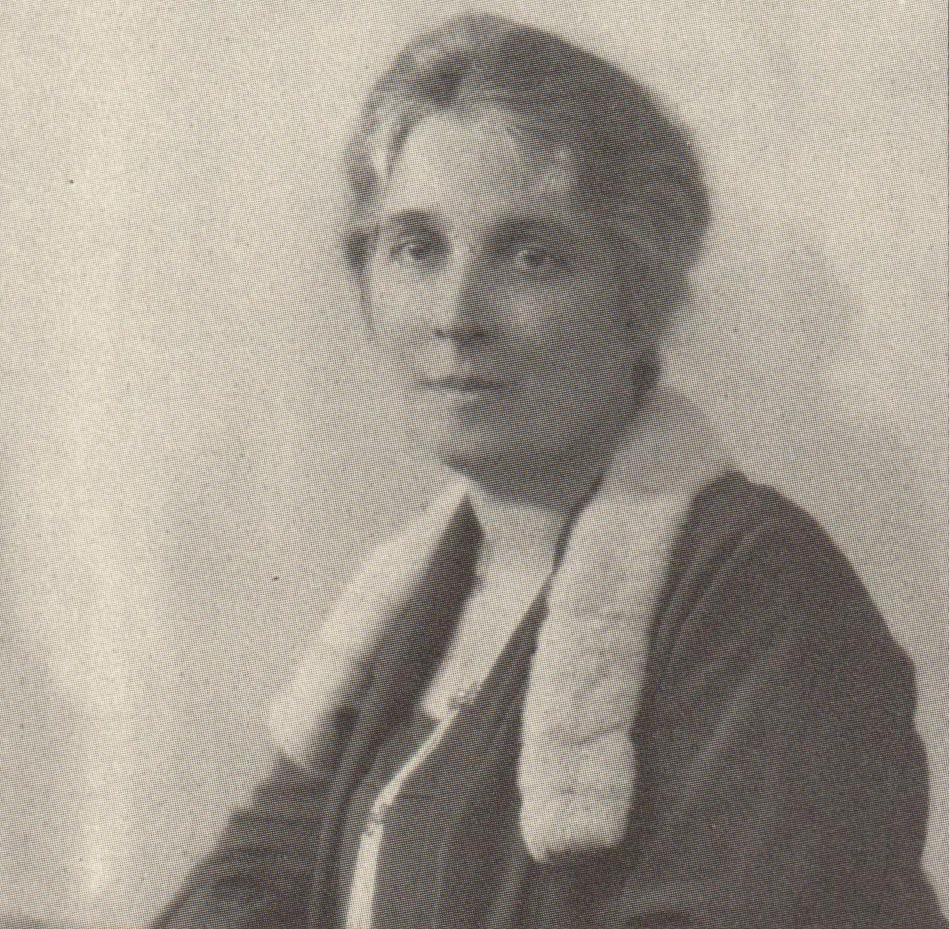
Queene Ferry Coonley, founder and patron of the Avery Coonley School from 1906 to 1958. She was remembered as an advocate for women's suffrage and progressive education.

Coonley died in 1958. With her donations now missing, ACS began charging tuition in 1929. By 1964, enrollment had (again) reached 200 students.

In 1965, the Administrative Board purchased Avery Coonley from the NCE. ACS joined the Independent Schools Association of the Central States (ISACS) in 1961. ISACS was founded in 1908 to promote best practices in independent schools, and instituted a mandatory accreditation program for member schools in 1961. Avery Coonley served as ISACS headquarters from 1970 until the central office was dissolved in 2000.

Malach also established the Institute for Educational Research (IER) in 1964 as a center for educational experimentation. The Institute, headquartered at ACS, was a joint venture with more than thirty public school districts, which collaborated on research projects and shared in the findings. Examples of other projects include kindergarten speech programs, elementary science programs, and speed reading in junior high school.

=== Gifted education (1960s–present) ===
The kindergarten reading program was the first step in the Avery Coonley School's transition to a new focus on the education of the gifted. An increasing focus on gifted education in North America was symbolized by the 1972 Marland Report to the United States Congress, which was the first acknowledgment of the characteristics of gifted children and their specific educational needs. ACS headmaster Malach believed that the educational philosophy of his school was well aligned with the most important objectives of a gifted program.

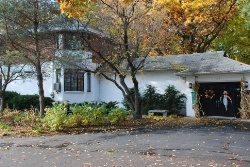
The Gatehouse, originally the headmaster's residence, has housed the early childhood program since 1989.

In 1960, ACS began screening applicants for high intellectual potential, requiring a tested IQ above 120, achievement test results one and a half grade levels above national norms in reading and math, and intensive in-person evaluations. Teachers began adapting the curriculum accordingly. The core of the gifted curriculum remained the individualized approaches and learning by doing.

== Campus ==
=== 1929 building ===
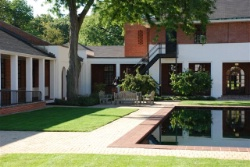
The original 1929 construction, showing the cloister and reflecting pool. The original landscape design was restored in 2006.

The campus occupies 10.45 acres (4.23 ha) off of Maple Avenue in Downers Grove. It borders the Maple Grove Forest Preserve, created in 1919, one of the oldest forest preserves in the Forest Preserve District of DuPage County system. The 82-acre (33 ha) preserve protects "the largest remaining remnant of the vast maple forest that became Downers Grove", and has been categorized a globally endangered ecosystem. The forest is a refuge for a wide range of birds and trees. The preserve is used by students in their science and nature activities.

The designer of the grounds, Jens Jensen, was known as "the father of the Chicago park system." His work became famous for his exclusive use of plants and materials native to the local region, and was characterized by his use of open spaces, flowing water, gently curving lines, and low circular benches, where people can gather. A restoration of Jensen's landscape design was completed in 2006 as part of the ACS centennial celebration.

The building was designed by Coonley's son-in-law Waldron Faulkner with his son Avery Coonley Faulkner. The design in the style of the Prairie School was typical of the American Arts and Crafts style. The building surrounds a courtyard with a large reflecting pool. The classrooms are oriented outward, to provide views of the surrounding forest. There are no interior passages in this part of the building; each class area has an exit to the outside, and students pass between rooms via the covered cloister, even in inclement weather. The design is meant to reinforce the "home and school" atmosphere that dates back to the Cottage School, with child-sized classrooms, ten working fireplaces, draperies, and other home-like details. Decorative tiles designed by Henry Chapman Mercer are placed throughout the building, tinted in deep colors. The tiles on the fireplaces and entry floors contain patterns in literary and educational themes, such as The Canterbury Tales in the old library, and a large tripartite tile on the north wall of the courtyard depicting the eastern and western hemispheres connected by a ship. The easy access to the outdoors, ground floor classrooms, separate science laboratories, and planned outdoor play area are among the features of the design that would later be adopted by schools throughout the US after World War II.

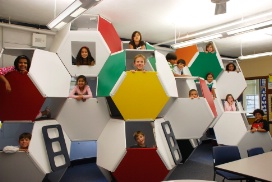
Interconnected "Learning Spaces" in the third grade classroom, designed in 1970 and patented by the school

The Avery Coonley School was designated a historical site by the Downers Grove Historical Society in 2006. It was also added to the National Register of Historic Places in 2007 due to the influence of the curriculum, architecture, and grounds.

=== Recent additions ===
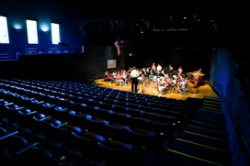
The Performing Arts Center (PAC), part of the 1993 addition. Drama, music, and other performances are an integral part of the curriculum.

A new wing was added in early 1980 to provide additional space for the arts, with a large room for orchestra and music and another for studio art. Filling in the previously open east side of the courtyard, the design is nearly identical in design to the original school, built of red and white-washed brick with a cloister on the courtyard side. The Gatehouse, which was built in 1929 and had served as the headmaster's residence, was remodeled to house the early childhood program in 1988.

A 1992 addition included a new 17,500-volume library, a 16-station computer lab, and a 236-seat Performing Arts Center (PAC). Moravian tiles around the new foyer fireplace and library doors pay homage to the original building. The PAC "is known for its excellent acoustics", and hosts student productions and outside artistic groups, including the Beck Institute for the Arts, which stages musical recitals there.

Avery Coonley added a full-day kindergarten program in 2005, again requiring more space and a 15,000-square-foot (1,400 m^{2}) middle school wing. Its cream and red bricks, hipped roof, deep eaves, and detailed brickwork harmonize with the style of the earlier building.

== Curriculum ==
The founding educational philosophy is still evident in the modern day curriculum in the focus on learning by doing, teaching based on broad themes that cross subjects, an emphasis on collaborative projects, and a de-emphasis of textbooks. There remains a close integration of art and nature in daily activities and a focus on the development of social skills and education for social responsibility. These principles, adapted in the 1970s for gifted students, have been further extended to accommodate new developments in technology and educational research.

ACS refers to grade levels as groups, a practice rooted in progressive education that dates back at least to the Junior Elementary School. There are three divisions of students: the early school, which includes the early childhood Program (EC) for three-year-olds and junior kindergarten (JK) for four-year-olds; the lower school for kindergarten through group four, and middle school for groups five through eight. Each class in kindergarten through group eight has 32 students. Each lower school class is team taught by two teachers. The student-to-teacher ratio in the lower and middle school is 16 to 1, 11 to 1 in kindergarten, 8 to 1 in junior kindergarten, and 7 to 1 in the early childhood program.

=== Academic program ===
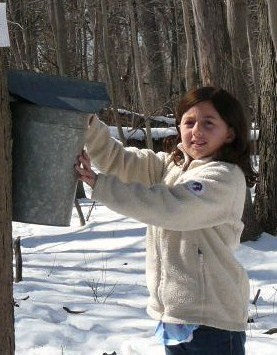
A second group student collecting sap for maple syrup in the Forest Preserve, the culmination of her study of trees

As of 2009, the curriculum is accelerated for each group, which is separated by grade and age; students are instructed a minimum of one year above their current grade level. (For example, the first group is taught at a second grade level.) Students are grouped within their class to allow each of them work at the level of their ability, and they may work several years beyond their current level if they can do so. Students may join older groups to study subjects, which they are exceptionally advanced; however, age groups are usually kept together "for social and emotional values". All middle school students complete a high school level honors course in mathematics in either algebra or geometry.

All students study French, which is taught by language immersion, a technique in which they only speak French during language study. All signs in the building are written in both French and English.

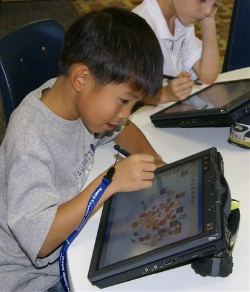
An Avery Coonley student with a tablet computer, assigned to older students and made available to all students beginning at age three

=== Technology ===
Avery Coonley began using computers for instruction in 1971 and offering computer programming to students as young as the fourth group in 1976. Desktop computers were brought into the classrooms to teach math, language arts, music, art, and computer programming, in 1978. Students begin learning basic keyboard and mouse skills in kindergarten and progress to multimedia presentations, data management, and software coding in the eighth group.

In what ACS calls "one-to-one computing", every student in the fifth group through the eighth group receives a tablet computer, which they use to manage their daily schedules, work on class assignments, and prepare special projects. Students in early childhood and junior kindergarten have shared tablets available, and each kindergarten through the fourth group class has at least four. Students study in classrooms equipped with wireless overhead projectors, manipulate programs and presentations on touchscreen-equipped SMART board systems, and engage in self-paced classroom learning using ActiveExpression wireless response systems. Students, teachers, and parents communicate and interact online via a school-wide intranet and an extranet for parents. Sixteen dual platform iMacs were added in 2009 for computer lab work.

== Traditions ==
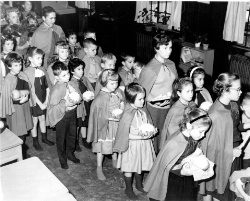
The Thanksgiving Program in 1962, it has been performed each year since 1929.

A hallmark of the curriculum in the earliest days was study organized around major themes—trees, Shakespeare, Egypt and other subjects—that built over the school year into major class projects, performances, and all-school gatherings. Many of these themes and events have grown into lasting school traditions, with which the school community has come to identify each group and certain times of year. One of the school's most cherished traditions, tapping maple trees to make syrup, began with the move to the new building in 1929. The Spring Fair, in which groups one through five each prepare and perform their own dance, has been held annually since the 1930s—the Maypole dance by the fifth group dates back to the beginning of the Cottage School.

In the annual Thanksgiving Program, the students, in identical brown capes, silently construct a large cornucopia of fruits and vegetables in a ceremony choreographed to music prepared by each class. The food is later donated to The Salvation Army. It is the most treasured of the school traditions, and has been performed every year, virtually unchanged, since 1929, until 2023 where speeches about each part of the ceremony were given by 8th group students. This marked the last year any students wore capes, as six students who had attended Avery Coonley from Early Childhood until 8th grade gave a speech in honor of the long-lasting practice, bringing an end to the tradition.

== Extracurricular activities ==
Many of the extracurricular activities offered at ACS offer an extension of classroom subjects and an opportunity for students to pursue those studies in additional depth. Within the arts program, chorus, creative writing, drama, art, and three levels of orchestra are offered as optional activities. Students in these groups have opportunities to perform and exhibit their work throughout the year. The Book Club is available to students in groups six and above to extend the reading program. Art Club, and Fiber Arts Club and Drama Club also offer opportunities to build on classroom activities. Another popular club among students is the Debate Club, which competes in middle and high school debate tournaments locally and around the nation.

The yearbook is called Reflections.

Intramural sports are offered to students in group five and interscholastic sports are available in groups five through eight. ACS competes in the West DuPage Elementary School Association (WDESA) Conference. Team sports include co-ed soccer, boys and girls' volleyball in the fall, boys' and girls' basketball in the winter, and co-ed track in the spring. There are no team tryouts and all students are free to participate.

== Student body and finances ==
Admission is competitive and decisions are based on evaluations of applicants' intellectual ability, social and emotional maturity, and readiness for the accelerated program of study. Applicants for kindergarten through eighth group must submit IQ test results at or above the 95th percentile (at or above 124 on the Wechsler Preschool and Primary Scale of Intelligence (WPPSI) or Wechsler Intelligence Scale for Children (WISC)), with consistent subtest scores, to qualify for consideration.

Avery Coonley serves 338 students aged 3 through 14 as of 2023, with a nearly even ratio of males to females in each grade. ACS seeks to achieve ethnic diversity in every group, and offers limited need-based aid to families of children who would otherwise be unable to attend. The student body is "primarily middle- and upper-class white suburban children", and students "come from some of the most affluent families" in Chicago's western suburbs, but thirty percent of the students are non-white.

Tuition for kindergarten through group eight was $23,950, junior kindergarten was $11,700, and early childhood $6,200 in 2018. The Annual Giving Fund makes up 3.5 percent and the Annual Auction another 5 percent of the operating budget ($5.9 million in 2008–2009).

== Academic achievement ==
"Avery Coonley reports that scores on the Iowa Test of Basic Skills, an exam given in schools across the United States, are in the top 1 percent in the nation", with average scores of 99 in all eight grades and all four test sections (vocabulary, comprehension, language arts, and mathematics). Avery Coonley was one of seventeen Illinois schools recognized as a Blue Ribbon School by the United States Department of Education in 1987–88 for "excellence in student success, school philosophy, curriculum, leadership, and climate". Students have a record of top honors at the state and national level in science, math, geography and other subjects stretching back as far as 1989. In recent competitions, students won 24 Gold Medals at the 2009 Illinois Junior Academy of Science (IJAS) Science Fair, and won the Science Olympiad Jr. High State Championship. Avery Coonley won the 2009 IMSA Junior High Mathematics Competition (with four out of five first place awards) and placed second in the 2009 Illinois State MATHCOUNTS competition. In 2008, a seventh group student placed in the top 0.2 percent of competitors from around the world with a perfect score in the 24th annual American Mathematics Contest.

The school's students regularly win academic competitions or rank highly. Controversy erupted in 1994, when ACS won the Illinois State Science Fair team competition for the fourth year in a row, prompting the IJAS "to banish the school from team competition for [the] next year, on the grounds that their students were 'just too good.'" The incident attracted national attention. Avery Coonley students won 24 top individual awards the following year.

== Notes ==
a: Harrison's teacher's college was founded in 1886 as Miss Harrison's Training School. It was renamed the Chicago Kindergarten College in 1893, became the National Kindergarten College in 1912, and the National College of Education in 1930. It was as the National College of Education that it merged with Avery Coonley in 1943. The National College of Education was renamed yet again in 1990, when it became National Louis University.
b: The windows were later removed and sold at auction. Several of them are in the collections of the Metropolitan Museum of Art in New York and the Art Institute of Chicago.
c: Coonley helped found six private kindergartens between 1906 and 1920. Among these was a kindergarten for the nearby village of Brookfield, Illinois, founded in 1911. The Brookfield Kindergarten was located at 3601 Forest Avenue, and designed by one of Wright's students, William E. Drummond. It is listed on the Historic American Buildings Survey, which considers it "one of his finest designs". It was acquired by the Board of Education in 1929 and used as a public kindergarten. It is now split into two private residences.
d: Faulkner would later design a house in Washington, D.C., for Morse, as a retirement gift from Coonley.
e: Jensen had worked on the extensive gardens at the Coonley House from 1908 to 1917 and designed the Playhouse grounds in 1913.

== Works cited ==
- Brown, Stephen; Finn, Mary; Brown, Eileen (1988). Readings from Progressive Education: A Movement and Its Professional Journal: Vol 1. Lanham, MD: University Press of America. ISBN 978-0-8191-6916-7.
- Dewey, John; Evelyn (1915). Schools of To-Morrow. New York: E.P. Dutton & Company. OCLC 962918.
- Dewey, John (1998). Experience and Education (60th anniversary ed.). West Lafayette, Indiana: Kappa Delta Pi. ISBN 978-0-912099-34-7.
- Follett, Jean A. (November 2006). "NRHP Nomination: Avery Coonley School". National Register of Historic Places. National Park Service..
- Grese, Robert (1992). Jens Jensen: Maker of Natural Parks and Gardens. Baltimore: Johns Hopkins University Press. ISBN 978-0-8018-4287-0.
- Hartman, Gertrude (1938). Finding Wisdom: Chronicles of a School of Today. New York: The John Day Company. OCLC 2922594.
- Marland, S. P. Jr. (1972). Education of the Gifted and Talented: Report to the Congress of the United States by the U.S. Commissioner of Education and Background Papers Submitted to the U.S. Office of Education. Washington, D.C.: U.S. Government Printing Office. OCLC 334925.
- Portman, Chris (2008). A Simple Wish: The First Century of the Avery Coonley School. Downers Grove, IL: The Avery Coonley School. OCLC 225533489.
- Reed, Cleota (1987). Henry Chapman Mercer and the Moravian Pottery and Tile Works. Philadelphia: University of Pennsylvania Press. ISBN 978-0-8122-8076-0.
