= George Mann Niedecken =

American architect (1878–1945)

- George Mann Niedecken
- Born: August 16, 1878; Milwaukee, Wisconsin, U.S.
- Died: November 3, 1945 (aged 67)
- Resting place: Forest Home Cemetery, Milwaukee
- Education: Wisconsin Art Institute
- Alma mater: Art Institute of Chicago
- Spouse: Mary (née) Thayer

George Mann Niedecken (August 16, 1878 – November 3, 1945) was an American prairie style furniture designer and interior architect from Milwaukee, Wisconsin. He is best known for his collaboration with the architect Frank Lloyd Wright. He also designed interiors for Marion Mahony Griffin who was one of the first female architects.

== Early life ==
Niedecken was born August 16, 1878, in Milwaukee. At twelve years old he attended the Wisconsin Art Institute, and he studied under artist Richard Lorenz. When he was 19 he moved to Chicago and entered the Art Institute of Chicago. There he was instructed by Louis Millet. From 1899 to 1902 he studied art in Europe. In 1902 he returned to Milwaukee, Wisconsin where he took a position teaching decorative arts at the Wisconsin School of Arts. Niedecken married Mary (née) Thayer on October 2, 1905, and their only child died shortly after birth.

== Career ==
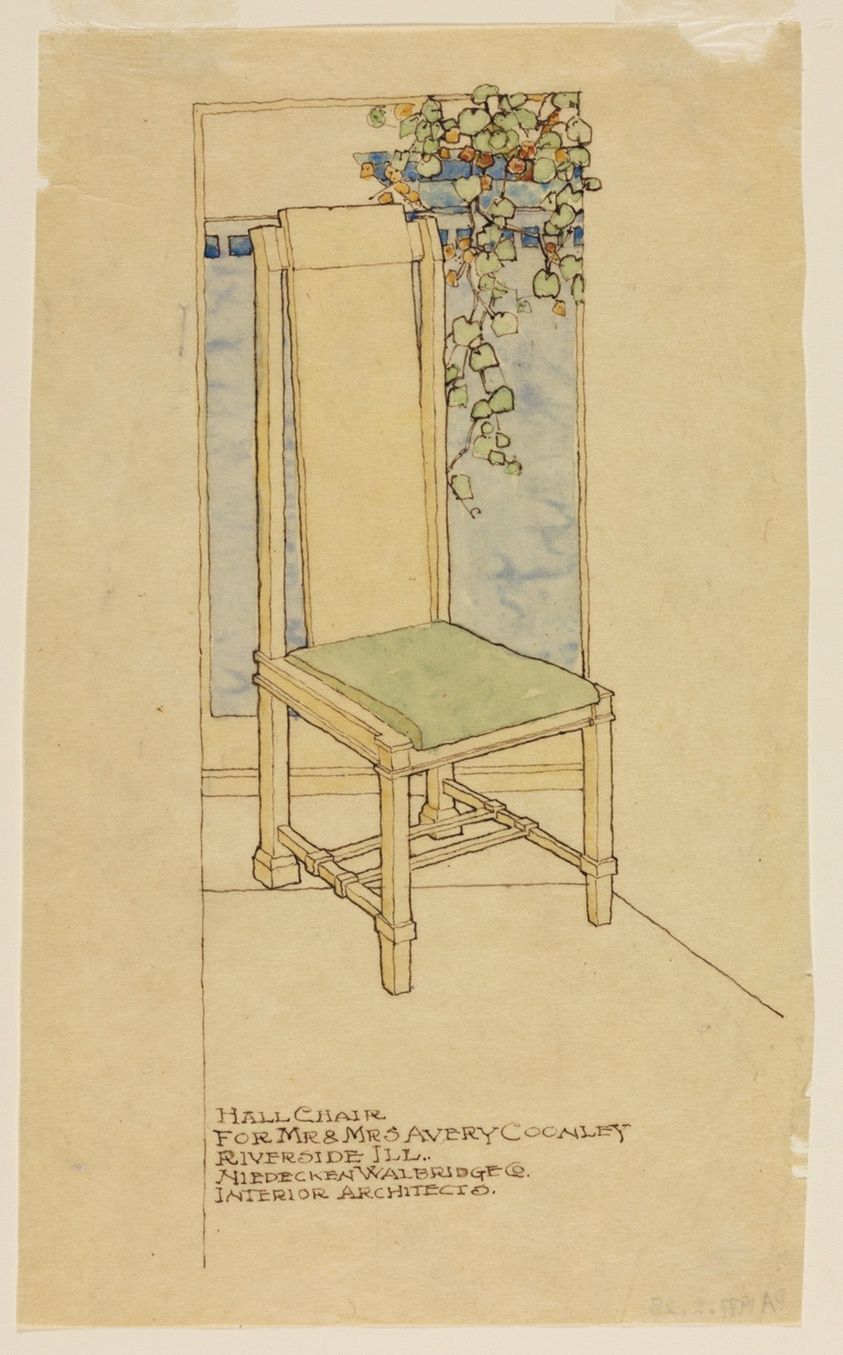
George Mann Niedecken Hall Chair Design 1907

Niedecken started an interior-architecture firm in 1907, called Niedecken-Waldbridge, with his brother-in-law in Milwaukee. He became known for his work in Prairie style buildings. He worked closely with the architect Frank Lloyd Wright (1902 and 1918). Niedecken worked on eleven Wright commissions providing interior design with textiles, lighting, furniture and arts. The relationship began in 1902 when he was commissioned by Wright to make a mural for the Dana–Thomas House. He worked on the design for several Chicago area Wright commissions, including the Avery Coonley House, and the Frederick Robie House. The collaboration ended in 1918 when Wright opened an office in Los Angeles, and Niedecken stayed in Milwaukee. In 1999 Cheryl Robertson wrote a book about Niedecken's work with Wright, Frank Lloyd Wright and George Mann Niedecken : Prairie School collaborators.

He also made interior design for Marion Mahony Griffin's commissions. Mahony was a close associate of Frank Lloyd Wright along with Niedecken. He designed furniture and murals for the Amberg and Irving houses which were Mahony commissions. Mahony was one of the first licensed female architects in the world, and she is considered an original member of the Prairie School.

In 1999 Wendy Moonan of The New York Times said, "Flea market aficionados take note: pieces by Niedecken are a new collecting category." In 2007 he received a Wisconsin Visual Arts Lifetime Achievement Award.
