= F. F. Tomek House =

Historic house in Illinois, United States

- U.S. National Register of Historic Places
- U.S. National Historic Landmark
- U.S. National Historic Landmark District – Contributing property
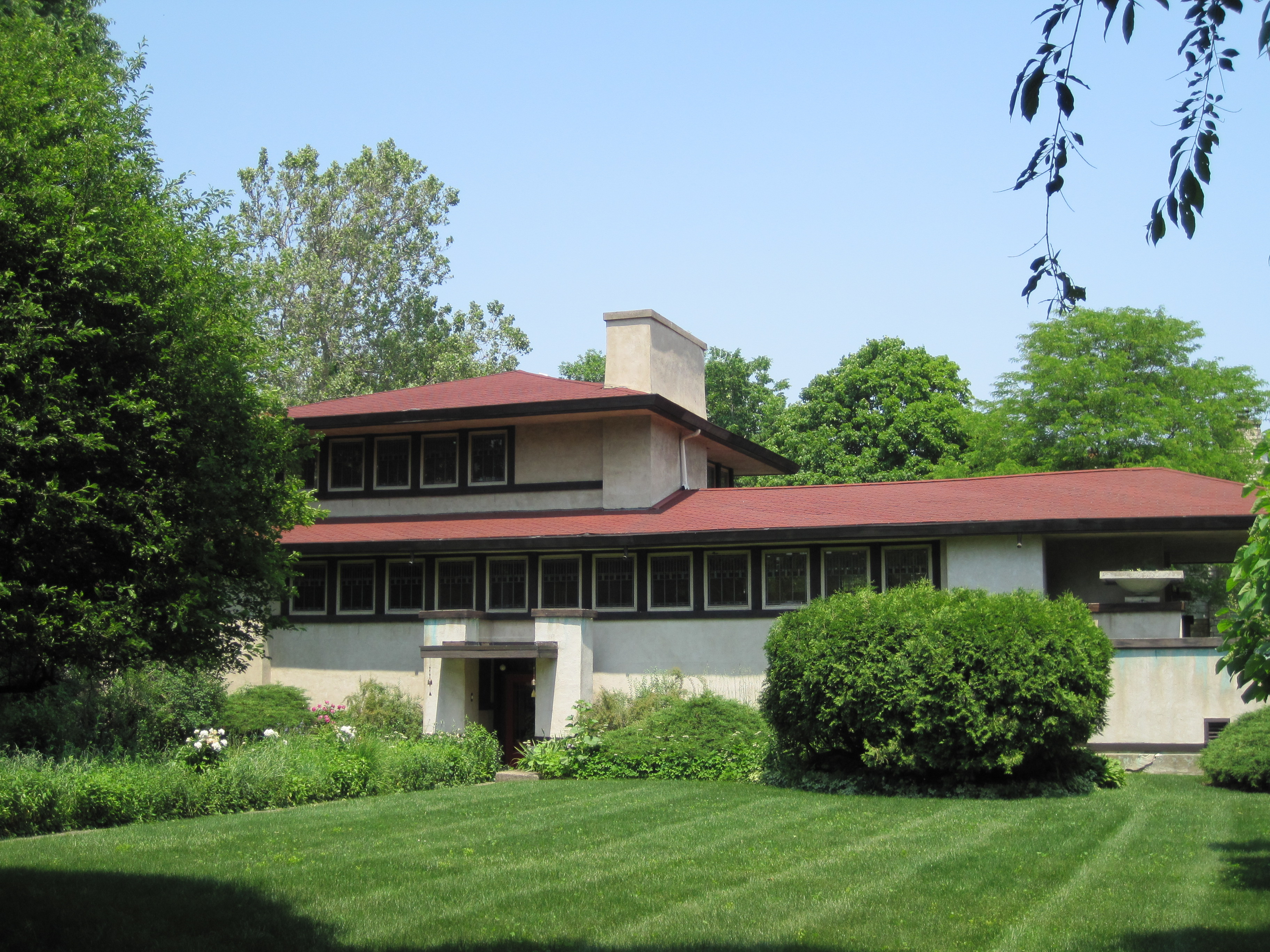
- The F. F. Tomek House in 2011

- Location within Illinois Location within the United States
- Location: 150 Nuttall Road, Riverside, Illinois
- Coordinates: 41°49′55.75″N 87°49′1.56″W
- Built: 1904
- Architect: Frank Lloyd Wright
- Architectural style: Prairie School
- Part of: Riverside Historic District (ID69000055)
- NRHP reference No.: 99000632

Significant dates
- Added to NRHP: January 20, 1999
- Designated NHL: January 20, 1999
- Designated NHLDCP: August 29, 1970

The F. F. Tomek House, also known as The Ship House or as the Ferdinand Frederick and Emily Tomek House, is a historic house in Riverside, Illinois. It is a prominent example of Prairie School design by Frank Lloyd Wright. Designed in 1904 and finished in 1906, the Tomek House is a well-preserved example of the style. In addition to being a good example of the Prairie style, the Tomek house documents the development of the style, which reached its clearest expression in Wright's Robie House in 1908. It is included in the Riverside Historic District and was declared a National Historic Landmark in 1999.

== History ==
The Tomek House was constructed for Ferdinand Frederick Tomek from 1905 to 1906. Tomek worked in a factory that produced picture frames and wooden moldings. The Tomeks resided in the house until 1924. The house is considered an important artifact of the development of Frank Lloyd Wright's Prairie School of design. Barry Byrne was the assistant architect for the house. The Tomek house served as a model for the Robie House, Wright's famed 1910 design. Like most of his projects, Wright designed the furniture for the Tomek house.

In 1973, the Illinois Historic Structures Survey identified it as a significant site. The house has been extensively restored. The Illinois Department of Conservation approved a grant for this purpose to the Moran family in 1979. The Illinois Historic Preservation Agency approved the changes and issued a Certificate of Rehabilitation. In 1993, the Frank Lloyd Wright Building Conservancy was offered an easement to help protect the residence. On January 20, 1999, the house was named a National Historic Landmark by the National Park Service, owing to its role as a site of national-level significance.

Floor layouts

== See also ==
- List of Frank Lloyd Wright works
- List of National Historic Landmarks in Illinois
- National Register of Historic Places listings in Cook County, Illinois

== Sources ==
- Storrer, William Allin (1993). The Frank Lloyd Wright Companion. Chicago: University of Chicago Press. ISBN 978-0-226-77624-8. (S.128)
- Moran, Maya (1995). Down to Earth: An Insider's View of Frank Lloyd Wright's Tomek House. Southern Illinois University Press. ISBN 978-0-8093-1559-8.
