= Waldron Faulkner =

American architect (1898–1979)

- Born: January 21, 1898; Paris, France
- Died: May 11, 1979 (aged 81); Washington, D.C.
- Occupation: Architect

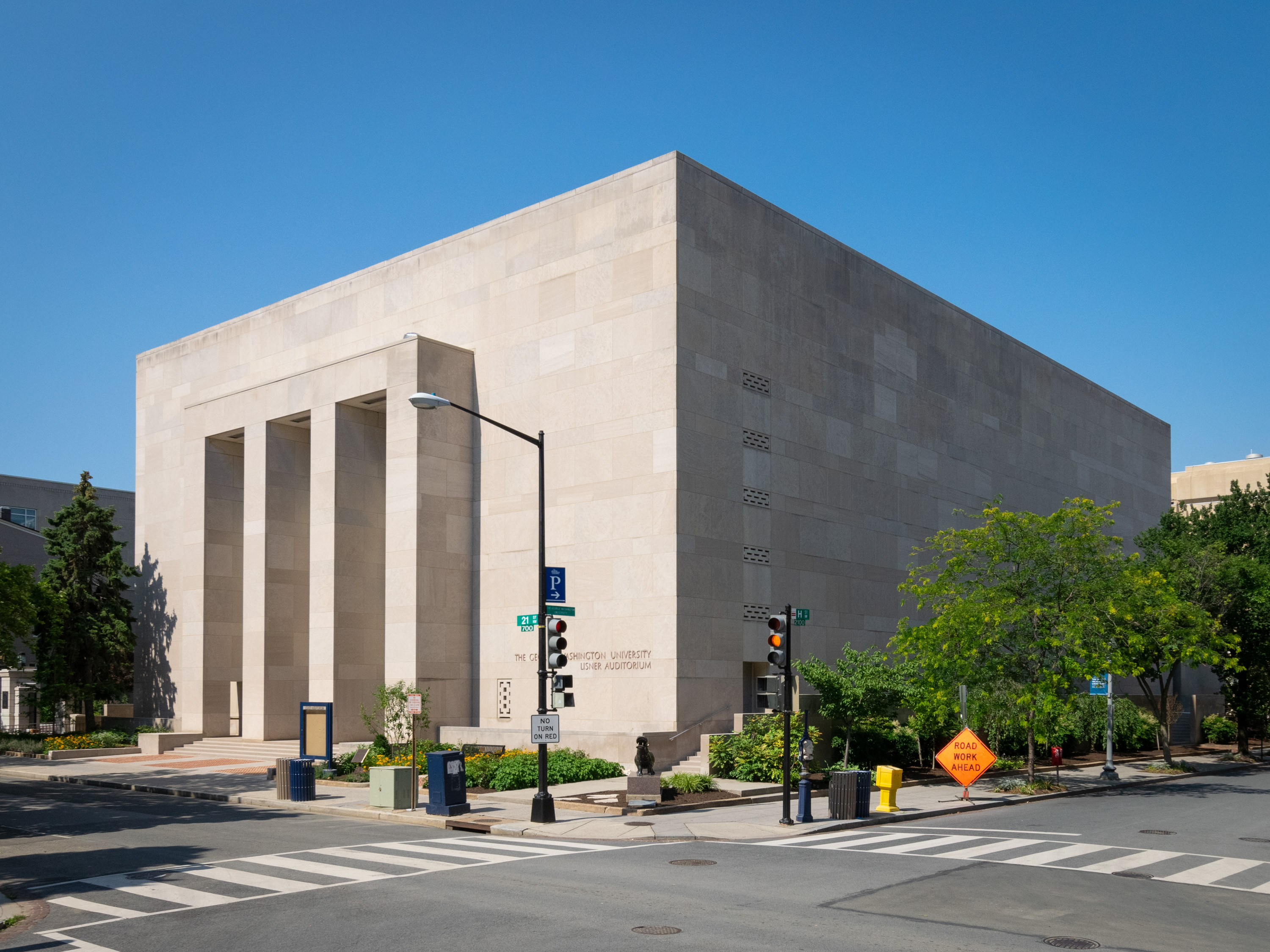
Lisner Auditorium of George Washington University, designed by Faulkner & Kingsbury and completed in 1946.

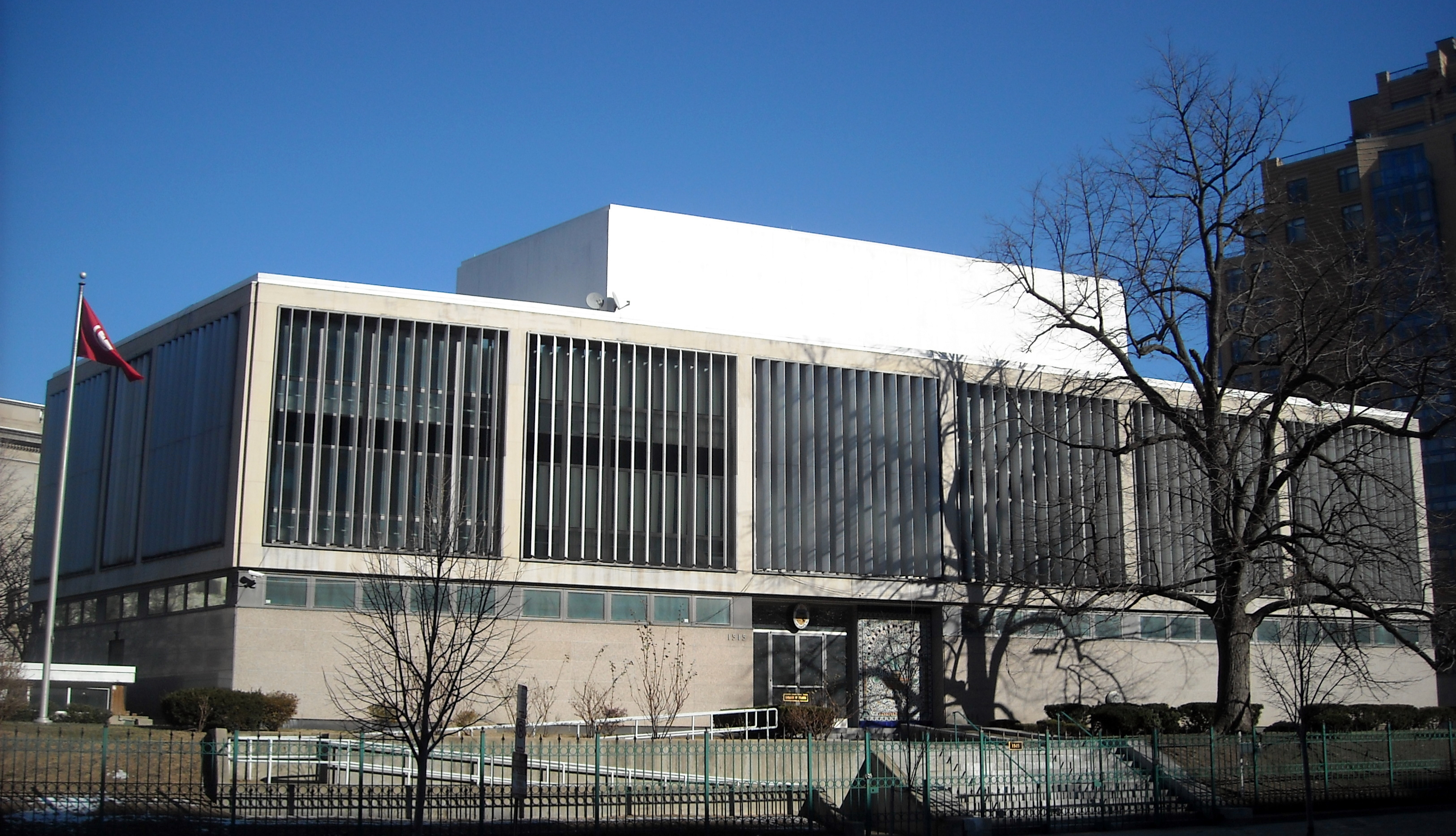
The former American Association for the Advancement of Science building, now the Embassy of Tunisia, completed in 1956.

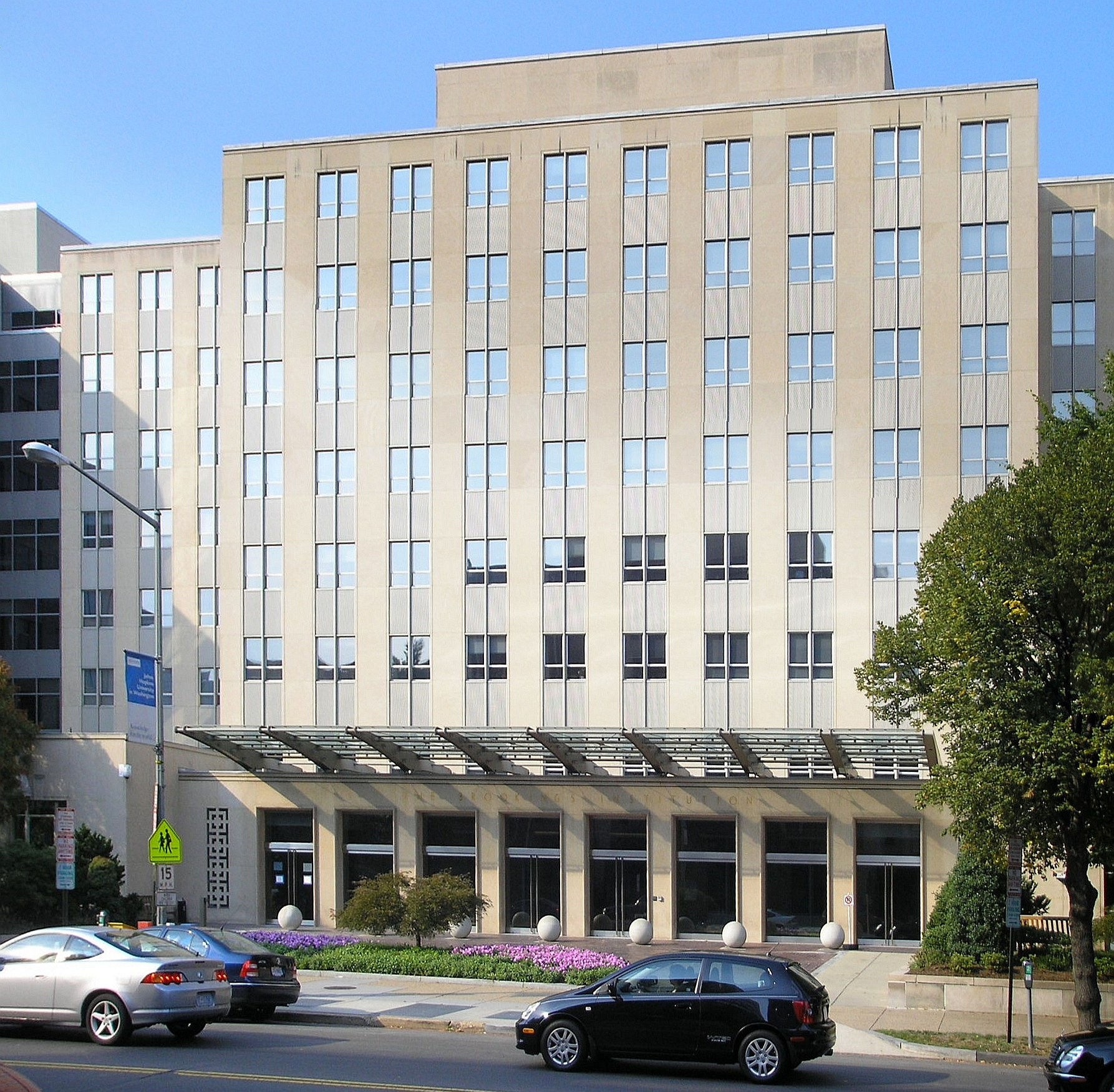
The Brookings Institution building in Washington, designed by Faulkner, Kingsbury & Stenhouse and completed in 1957.

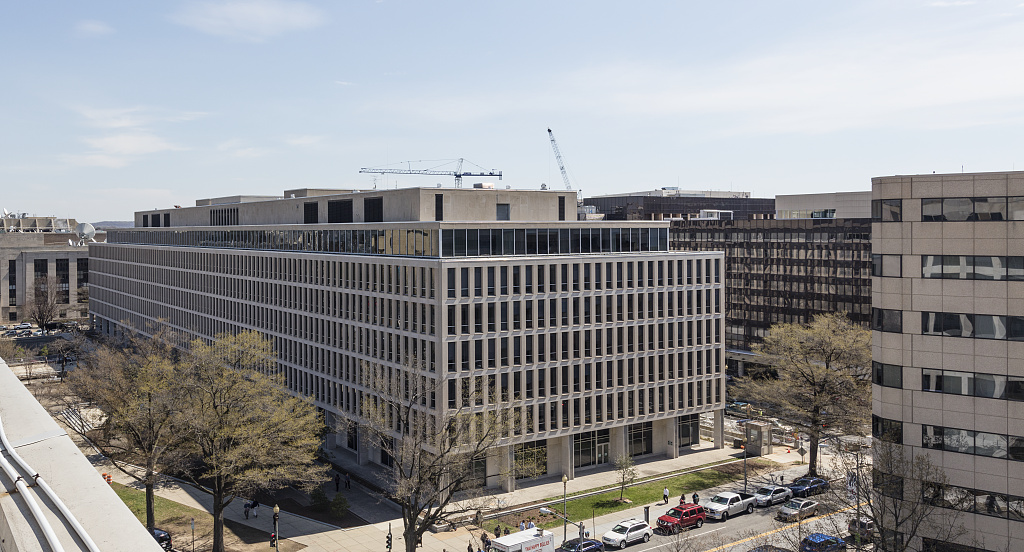
The Lyndon Baines Johnson Department of Education Building in Washington, D.C., designed by Chatelain, Gauger & Nolan and Faulkner, Kingsbury & Stenhouse and completed in 1961.

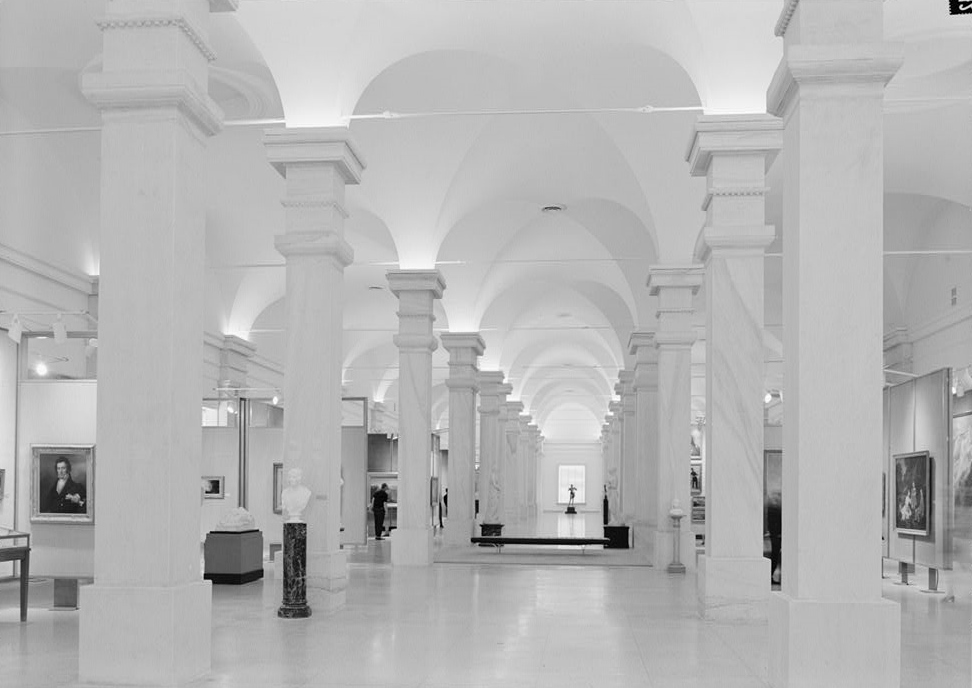
The Lincoln Gallery in the Smithsonian American Art Museum, as remodeled by Faulkner, Stenhouse, Fryer & Faulkner, completed in 1968.

Waldron Faulkner (January 21, 1898 – May 11, 1979) was an American architect in practice in New York City and Washington, D.C. from 1927 to until his retirement 1968. Faulkner was a sole practitioner until 1939, when he formed a partnership with Slocum Kingsbury FAIA, his long-time collaborator. Later partners of the firm included Faulkner's son, Avery C. Faulkner FAIA, who sold the firm to CannonDesign in 1982.

== Life and career ==
Herbert Winthrop Waldron Faulkner was born January 21, 1898, in Paris to American parents. He was educated at Yale University, graduating with a BFA in architecture in 1924. He worked for New York City architects Richard Henry Dana IV, York & Sawyer, James Gamble Rogers and Leigh French Jr. before opening his own office in 1927. In 1934 he moved to Washington. In 1935 he hired Slocum Kingsbury, a coworker from York & Sawyer, and in 1939 they formed a partnership, Faulkner & Kingsbury. In 1946 the partnership was expanded to include another employee, John W. Stenhouse, as Faulkner, Kingsbury & Stenhouse. They practiced together until Kingsbury's retirement in 1964, and in 1966 the partnership was reorganized to include Frederick L. Fryer and Faulkner's son, Avery C. Faulkner, as Faulkner, Stenhouse, Fryer & Faulkner. Faulkner retired from active practice in 1968. The firm, afterwards led by the younger Faulkner, was renamed Faulkner, Fryer & Vanderpool and was ultimately acquired by Cannon Design of Grand Island, New York, now CannonDesign, in 1982.

Faulkner first came to prominence in the late 1920s as the architect of the Avery Coonley School in Downers Grove, Illinois, founded by his mother-in-law, Queene (Ferry) Coonley. After his move to Washington he was noted as an architect of public-facing buildings, including extensive work for George Washington University and American University. The office was also architect for many hospitals, the design of which was usually led by his partner, Kingsbury. Faulkner's last major work was the conversion of the Old Patent Office Building into the Smithsonian American Art Museum and the National Portrait Gallery, which both opened in 1968.

Faulkner joined the American Institute of Architects in 1929, and was elected a Fellow in 1951. Faulkner was president of the Washington chapter for the year 1942–43 and was chair of the national library committee from 1954 to 1963. Faulkner was an authority on the use of color in architecture, and in 1949 he was appointed AIA delegate to the Inter-Society Color Council, of which he was president from 1956 to 1958. He was the author of Architecture and Color, published by John Wiley & Sons in 1972.

== Personal life ==
Faulkner was married in 1926 to Elizabeth Coonley, the daughter of Chicago industrialist Avery Coonley. They had two sons, Winthrop W. Faulkner and Avery C. Faulkner, both architects, and one daughter, Celia. Faulkner died May 11, 1979, at home in Washington at the age of 81.

== Architectural works ==
=== Waldron Faulkner, 1927–1939 ===
- Avery Coonley School, 1400 Maple Ave, Downers Grove, Illinois (1928–29, NRHP 2009)
- Hattie M. Strong Residence Hall, (Note: Designed in association with Alexander B. Trowbridge.) George Washington University, Washington, D.C. (1934–36, NRHP 1991)
- Bell Hall, George Washington University, Washington, D.C. (1935)
- Stuart Hall, George Washington University, Washington, D.C. (1936)
- Waldron Faulkner house, 3415 36th St NW, Washington, D.C. (1937)
- Hall of Government, George Washington University, Washington, D.C. (1938–39)
- Lisner Hall, George Washington University, Washington, D.C. (1939–40)

=== Faulkner & Kingsbury, 1939–1946 ===
- Baldwin House, Vassar College, Poughkeepsie, New York (1939–40)
- Lisner Auditorium, George Washington University, Washington, D.C. (1940–46, NRHP 1990)

=== Faulkner, Kingsbury & Stenhouse, 1946–1966 ===
- George Washington University Hospital, 901 23rd St NW, Washington, D.C. (1948, demolished 2003)
- Hannah Harrison School, 4470 MacArthur Blvd NW, Washington, D.C. (1950, demolished)
- Potomac School, 1301 Potomac School Rd, McLean, Virginia (1951)
- Bethesda Public Library, 7400 Arlington Rd, Bethesda, Maryland (1952, demolished)
- New Orleans VA Medical Center (former), (Note: Designed in association with Favrot & Reed.) 1601 Perdido St, New Orleans, Louisiana (1952)
- Broadcast House, 4001 Brandywine St NW, Washington, D.C. (1953)
- Embassy of South Korea (originally the Canadian Joint Staff Building), 2450 Massachusetts Ave NW, Washington, D.C.
- Providence Hospital, 1150 Varnum St NE, Washington, D.C. (1954)
- Armed Forces Institute of Pathology (former), 7144 13th Pl NW, Washington, D.C. (1955)
- Tompkins Hall of Engineering, George Washington University, 725 23rd Street, NW, Washington, DC,(1956)
- American Association for the Advancement of Science building (former), (Note: Presently (2023) the Embassy of Tunisia.) 1515 Massachusetts Ave NW, Washington, D.C. (1956)
- Brookings Institution building, Washington, D.C. (1957)
- Washington Evening Star building (former), 225 Virginia Ave SE, Washington, D.C. (1958, altered)
- Lyndon Baines Johnson Department of Education Building, (Note: Designed in association with Chatelain, Gauger & Nolan.) 400 Maryland Ave SW, Washington, D.C. (1959–61)
- Setting of the Equestrian statue of Simón Bolívar, Virginia Ave NW, Washington, D.C. (1959)
- American Chemical Society building, 1155 16th St NW, Washington, D.C. (1960, altered)
- St. Agnes Hospital, 900 S Caton Ave, Baltimore, Maryland (1961)
- Holy Cross Hospital, 1500 Forest Glen Rd, Silver Spring, Maryland (1963)
- McLean Medical Building, 1515 Chain Bridge Rd, McLean, Virginia (1965)
- Old Patent Office Building remodeling, 8th and G Sts NW, Washington, D.C. (1965–68)

=== Faulkner, Stenhouse, Fryer & Faulkner, 1966–1968 ===
- Beeghly Chemical Building, American University, Washington, D.C. (1967)
- Sacred Heart Hospital, 900 Seton Dr, Cumberland, Maryland (1967, demolished)
