= Junior Niedecken =

American stock car racing driver

- Born: February 10, 1957 (age 69); Pensacola, Florida, U.S.
- Achievements: Three-time NASCAR Grand American champion

NASCAR O'Reilly Auto Parts Series career
- 4 races run over 1 year
- Best finish: 42nd (1984)
- First race: 1984 Goody's 300 (Daytona)
- Last race: 1984 Mello Yello 300 (Charlotte)
Wins	Top tens	Poles
0	0	0

Sunoco Gulf Coast Championship Series career
- Debut season: 2009
- Current team: Niedecken Enterprises
- Car number: 99
- Starts: 18
- Wins: 0
- Poles: 0
- Statistics up to date as of September 12, 2013.

Wayne Niedecken Jr. (born February 10, 1957, in Pensacola, Florida), better known as Junior Niedecken, is an American stock car racing driver. Son of NASCAR driver Wayne Niedecken Sr., he is a long-term competitor in late model stock car competition in the southeastern United States.

== Career ==
Niedecken has competed in NASCAR races and is a three-time champion of the Grand American Stock Car series, winning the series' national championship back to back in 1980 and 1981. He competed in the Busch Series for Sims Brothers Racing in four races during the 1984 season, posting a best finish of ninth at Darlington Raceway. He finished twelfth in All Pro Super Series standings in 1988, and has competed in the Snowball Derby twenty-eight times, with a best finish in the event of second in 1990.

== Motorsports career results ==
=== NASCAR ===
(key) (Bold – Pole position awarded by qualifying time. Italics – Pole position earned by points standings or practice time. * – Most laps led.)

==== Busch Series ====
NASCAR Busch Series results
Year	Team	No.	Make	1	2	3	4	5	6	7	8	9	10	11	12	13	14	15	16	17	18	19	20	21	22	23	24	25	26	27	28	29	NBGNC	Pts
1984	Sims Brothers Racing	76	Pontiac	DAY; 13	RCH	CAR; 14	HCY	MAR	DAR; 9	ROU	NSV	LGY	MLW	DOV	CLT; 11	SBO	HCY	ROU	SBO	ROU	HCY	IRP	LGY	SBO	BRI	DAR	RCH	NWS	CLT	HCY	CAR	MAR	42nd	513
