= Brinkerhoff =

Brinkerhoff or Brinckerhoff may refer to:

== People ==
- Brinkerhoff (surname)
- Brinkerhoff (given name)

== Places ==
- Brinkerhoff Avenue, which runs on the south side of the South Jamaica Houses in South Jamaica, Queens, New York City
- Brinkerhoff Avenue, Palisades Park, New Jersey
- Brinckerhoff, New York, a hamlet in Dutchess County, New York, United States.
- The Brinkerhoff, a vacation lodge in Grand Teton National Park on the shore of Jackson Lake in Wyoming
- Brinckerhoff Hall, a building (built in 1896) at Barnard College in New York City
- Brinkerhoff Street Historic District, a district of residences in Plattsburgh, New York
- Brinkerhoff Mall, a park in Queens, New York City
- Brinkerhoff Pond, in Bicknell, Wayne County, Utah
- Brinckerhoff Cemetery (aka Black Stump Cemetery), colonial-era burial ground located in the Fresh Meadows neighborhood of Queens, New York City

== Historical houses ==
National Register of Historic Places listings:
- Storm-Adriance-Brinckerhoff House, a 1769 home listed in East Fishkill, Dutchess County, New York
- Brinckerhoff House (1717), Fishkill, New York
- Brinkerhoff–Demarest House, listed in Teaneck, New Jersey
- Brinkerhoff Hill, listed in Madison County, New York
- George M. Brinkerhoff House, listed in Sangamon County, Illinois
- Romeyn-Oldis-Brinkerhoff House, listed in Bergen County, New Jersey
- Brinkerhoff–Becker House, listed in Washtenaw County, Michigan

== Commerce ==
- Parsons Brinckerhoff, an engineering and construction management organization with 14,000 employees in 150 offices worldwide, founded in 1885 in New York City
- Brinkerhoff Piano Company, an American manufacturer of pianos – high-quality, affordable uprights, baby grands, and player pianos – founded in Chicago in 1906 by William Temple Brinkerhoff (1870–1959); incorporated in 1911, affiliated with the M. Schulz Piano Company
