= Brinkerhoff (surname) =

Brinkerhoff or Brinckerhoff is a surname. Notable people with the surname include:

== 18th century ==
- Abraham Jorise Brinkerhoff (1745–1823), American trader, merchant, and patriot
- Dirck Brinckerhoff or Derick Brinkerhoff (1724–1789), American Revolutionary War soldier and New York legislator
- Henry Roelif Brinkerhoff (1787–1844), U.S. Congressman from Ohio

== 19th century ==
- Clara Maria Brinkerhoff (pseudonym, Henri Gordon; née Clara Maria Rolph; born 1828– ), English-born American singer and music educator
- Elbert Adrain Brinckerhoff (1838–1913), first mayor of Englewood, New Jersey
- George W. Brinkerhoff (1838–1919), American farmer and politician from Wayne County, New York
- Henry Morton Brinckerhoff (1868–1949), American highway and railway engineer
- Jacob Brinkerhoff (1810–1880), American jurist, Congressman, and author of the Wilmot Proviso
- John Hezekiah Brinkerhoff (1835–1915), American newspaper publisher from Wisconsin
- Robert Moore Brinkerhoff (1880–1958), American political cartoonist
- Roeliff Brinkerhoff (1828–1911), American Civil War officer and founder of the Ohio Historical Society
- William Brinkerhoff (1843–1919), American attorney and politician from Hudson County, New Jersey

== 20th century ==
- Burt Field Brinckerhoff (born 1936), American actor, director, and producer
- Charles McFarlan Brinckerhoff (1901–1987), American mining engineer and executive
- Constance Elizabeth Brinckerhoff (née Laurence; born 1942), American microbiologist, physician, and Professor Emeritus of Medicine at the Geisel School of Medicine, Dartmouth College
- Corinne Noel Brinkerhoff (born 1979), American television writer and producer
- John Brinkerhoff (1928–2020), associate director for national preparedness at FEMA
- Peter Corlies Brinckerhoff (born 1952), nonprofit management consultant
- Peter Andrew Brinckerhoff (born 1948), American television actor and director

== 21st century ==
- Corvas Kent Brinkerhoff II (born 1983), founding member of Meow Wolf, artist collective in Santa Fe, New Mexico

== Fictitious surname ==
- Brinkerhoff, character (last name only) in the 1936 film comedy, Love Before Breakfast
- Chad Brinkerhoff, character in the 1998 techno-thriller novel, Digital Fortress
- Richard Brinkerhoff, a professor at Godolkin University in charge of the Lamplighter School of Crimefighting, portrayed by Clancy Brown in The Boys (comics)
