= Greenville Downtown Historic District =

Historic district in Michigan, United States

- U.S. National Register of Historic Places
- U.S. Historic district
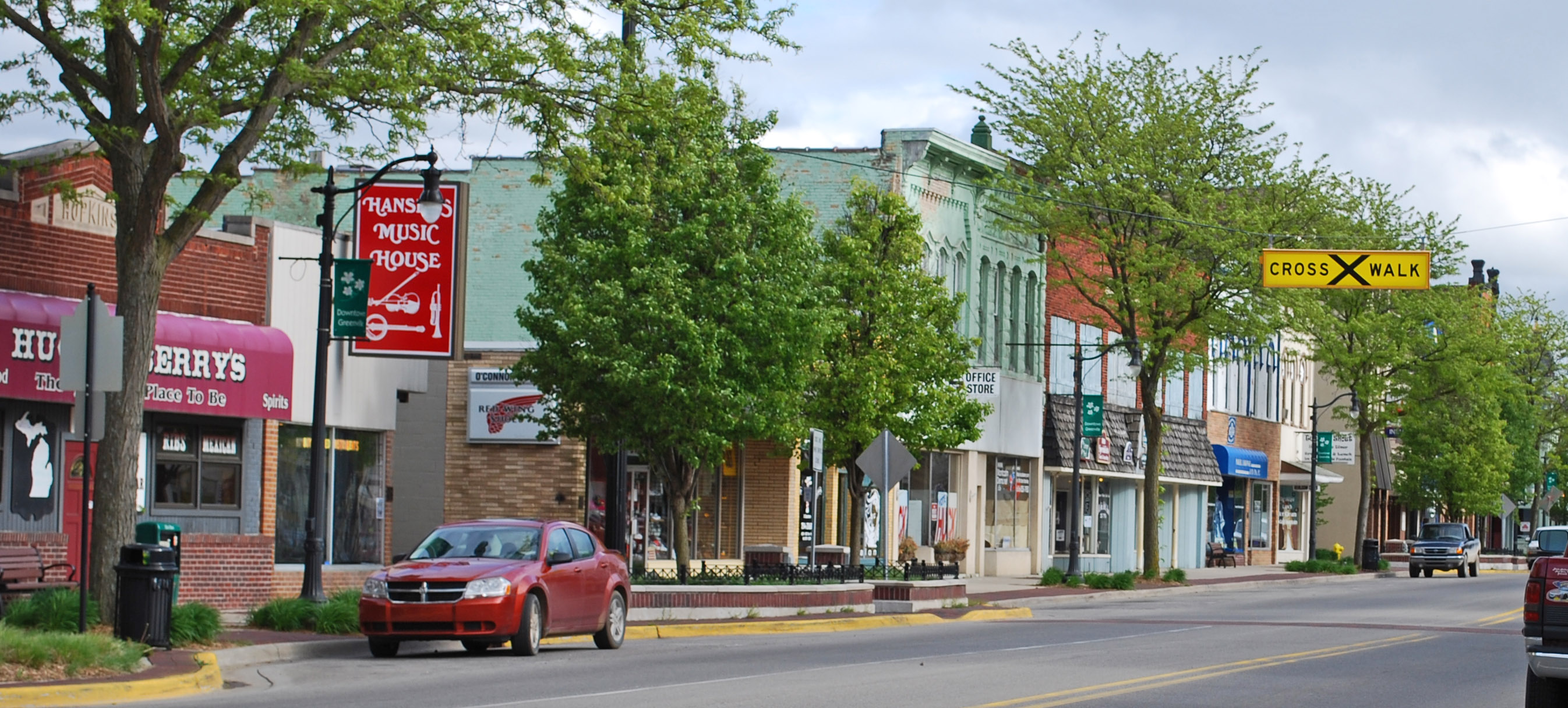
- East side of Lafayette between Grove and Cass

- Location within Michigan Location within the United States
- Interactive map
- Location: Lafayette between Montcalm and Benton and adjacent block of Montcalm, Grove, Cass, and Washington on either side, Greenville, Michigan
- Coordinates: 43°10′48″N 85°15′9″W
- Area: 15 acres (6.1 ha)
- Architect: Elijah E. Myers
- Architectural style: Late Victorian, Early Commercial
- NRHP reference No.: 08001104
- Added to NRHP: November 19, 2008

The Greenville Downtown Historic District is a commercial historic district located in Greenville, Michigan along Lafayette between Montcalm and Benton, along with the adjacent blocks of Montcalm, Grove, Cass, and Washington on either side. It was listed on the National Register of Historic Places in 2008.

== History ==
In 1844, John and Deborah Green moved from Fulton County, New York to this site in Montcalm County. The Greens purchased a plot of land and built a dam and sawmill. More settlers quickly arrived, including a millwright, blacksmith, carpenter, and doctor (John Green's brother, Thomas), who all settled in Greenville in 1845. The first merchant arrived in 1846, and a small town grew from that location. John Green himself financed many of the early businesses, and the site soon became a commercial hub for the county. In 1853, John Green and Manning Rutan platted areas of Greenville that included Lafayette and surrounding streets. John Green died in 1855, but when the city was later chartered, it was officially named Greenville in his honor.

In the 1850s and 60s, Greenville's business district began developing along Lafayette between Washington and Cass. The commercial buildings of the time were a mixture of one- and two-story wooden structures, none of which survive today. In 1868, Greenville adopted a fire code prohibiting new wooden buildings. Coupled with the rise in population due to logging activities, this created a construction boom in commercial buildings along Lafayette, and by 1875, about twenty substantial brick commercial blocks had been constructed. The national economic downturn prevented more construction until the mid-1880s. At that time, a series of fires along Lafayette prompted a new wave of construction, and a dozen more buildings were constructed in the later 1880s and early 1890s.

Development in the early 1900s was slow, as buildings were replaced or lots infilled. Construction halted during the Great Depression, then picked up again after World War II before essentially ceasing in the mid-1960s.

== Gallery ==
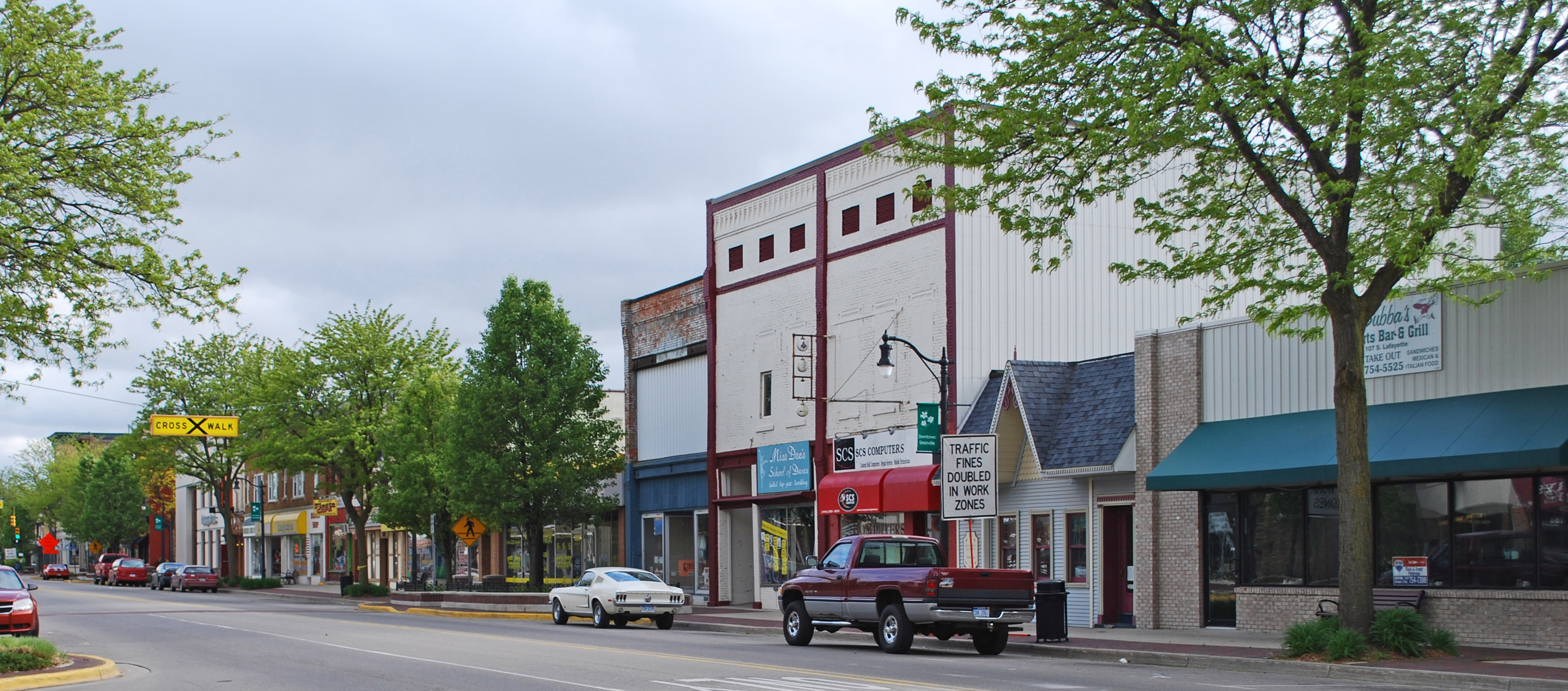
West side of Lafayette between Grove and Cass

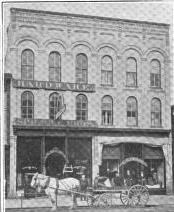
Sprague Hardware

== Description ==
The district contains 60 contributing buildings dating from the later nineteenth and early twentieth centuries; the oldest dates to 1869. Most of the structures are commercial blocks located along Lafayette, housing businesses on the first floor and office space or social meeting spaces on the upper floors. The district also includes churches, houses, and a hotel.

The significant structures in the district include:

=== Winter Inn (100 N. Lafayette) ===
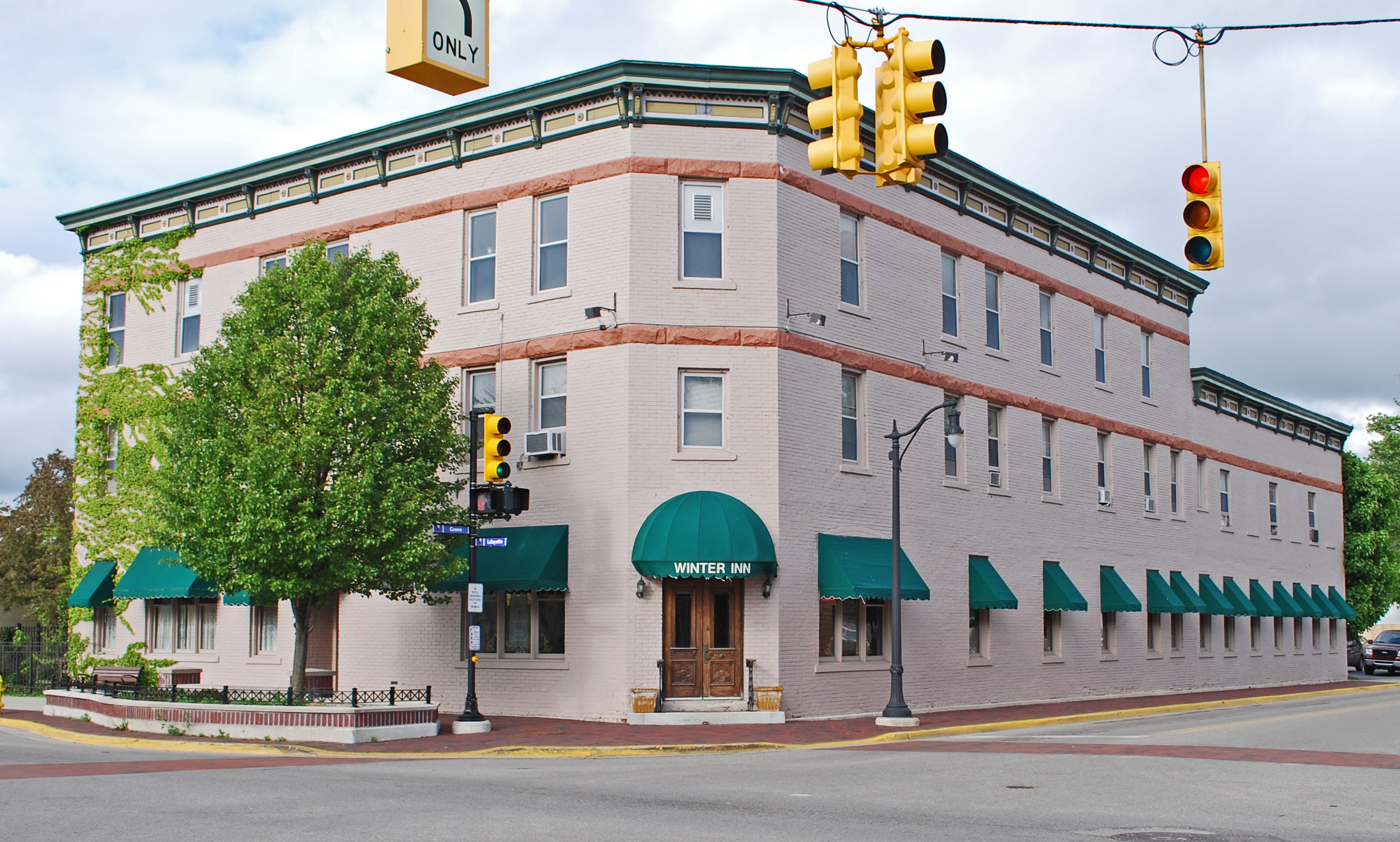
Winter Inn

The Winter Inn was built in 1901-02 by Thomas B. Winter on a site that had previously hosted a string of hotel buildings. The Winter Inn has continued to serve as a hotel until the present day, and is significant as a still-functioning example of a modest, locally owned hotel of a type once common in small towns like Greenville. It was designated a Michigan State Historic Site in 1979 and listed on the National Register of Historic Places in 1980.

=== Grabill Block (226 S. Lafayette) ===
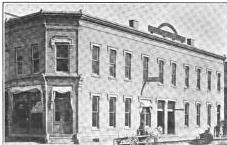
Grabill Block

Elliott F. Grabill was a Civil War veteran who settled in Greenville after the war. In 1866, he became the owner and editor of the Greenville Independent, and he constructed this building in the early 1880s. The Greenville Post Office was located in the building at the time Grabill was postmaster, and the Grabill ran the Independent out of this building well into the 20th century. The Grabill Block also housed a string of banks, starting with the First National Bank, which occupied part of the block starting in 1884, and then C. J. Church & Co. Bank and the Greenville State Bank, which occupied the same space until 1914.

=== St. Paul’s Episcopal Church (305 S. Clay) ===
St. Paul's Episcopal Church began life as the Greenville First Congregational Church, constructed in 1855/56. In 1879, the Congregationalists began construction of a new and larger church, and sold their 1856 building to the Episcopal congregation, who moved it across the street to the present site. The church is a simple gable roof structure covered with clapboard with a projecting square tower. The steep pitch of the roof, pointed arches over the windows, and triangular caps on the doorways and belfry openings give the building a Gothic Revival appearance.

=== Rider & Potter Block (301 S. Lafayette) ===
In 1870-71, Myron Rider and Thomas J. Potter constructed this brick building. It has a unique set of oculus windows above the third story, giving the structure a commanding appearance. At 50 feet high, it is still the tallest building located along Lafayette.

=== First Congregational Church (126 E. Cass) ===
The Greenville First Congregational Church was organized in 1852. In 1855/56 the congregation constructed a wood frame church on the site of the present church. In 1879, this church was sold to the Episcopalians and moved across the street, where it now serves as St. Paul's Episcopal Church. The Congregationalists hired Elijah E. Myers to design a new church, which was built in 1879-80.

=== Post Office Block (328-332 S. Lafayette) ===
In 1869, Hiram B. Fargo and James W. Belknap constructed the first brick building in Greenville on the corner of Lafayette and Washington, known then as the "Fargo & Belknap Block". In 1871-72, two additional store buildings of the same exterior design were constructed directly north of the Fargo & Belknap Block; the three together became known as the "Post Office Block" due to the early location of the post office in the center building.

=== Rutan Block (400-404 S. Lafayette) ===
In the late 1860s, Greenville eliminated what once had been a small public square at the corner of Lafayette and Washington, deeding the lots back to the original owners. One of those was Manning Rutan, one of the original platters of Greenville. In 1873-74, Rutan constructed a building on the site. The building initially housed his hardware stora and a stove business owned by Rutan's son, and a Grange Hall on the third floor.
