= Old Grand Rapids City Hall =

Coordinates: 42.9678°N 85.6696°W

- Grand Rapids City Hall
- Formerly listed on the U.S. National Register of Historic Places
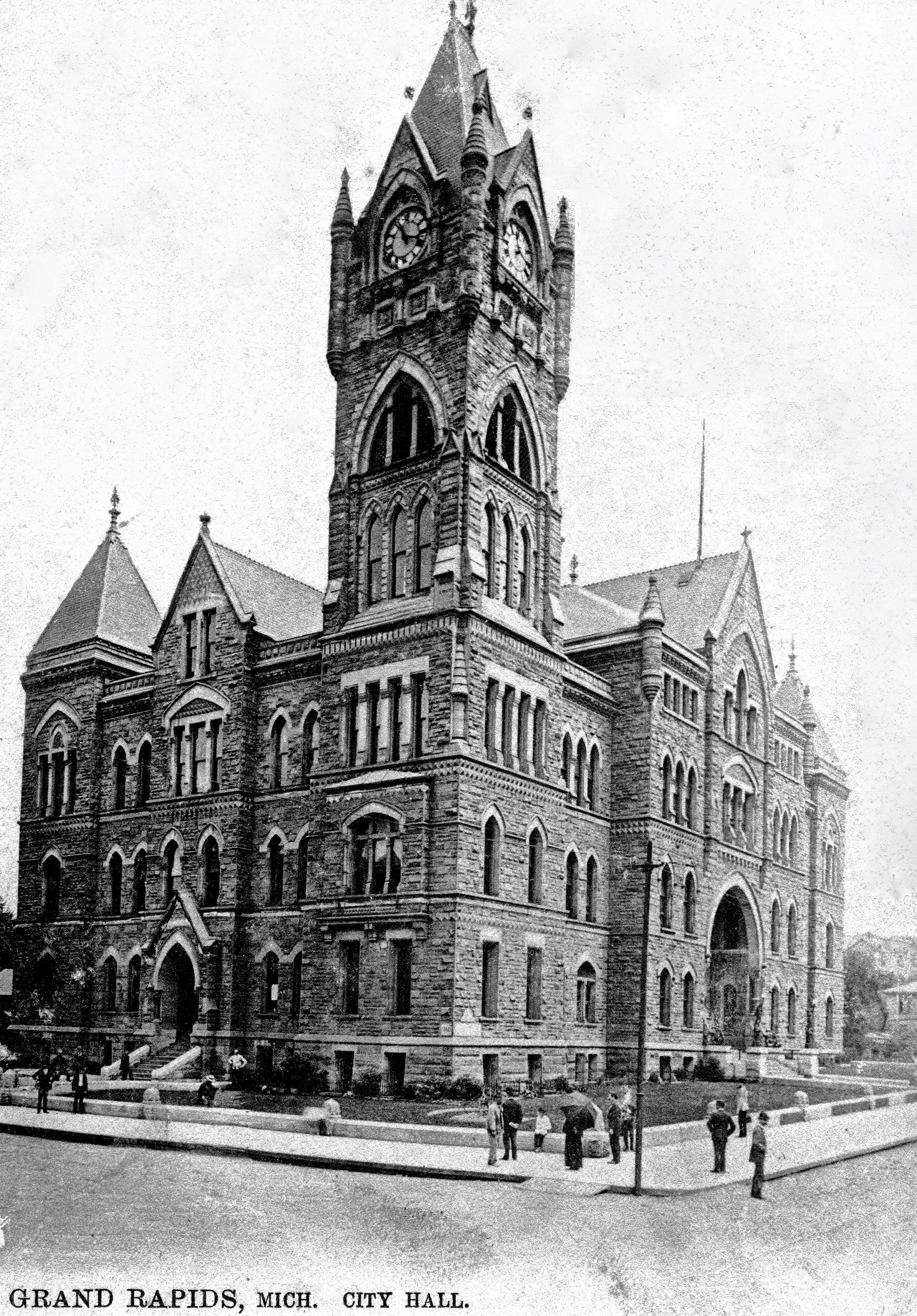
- Interactive map
- Location: 35 Lyon St., NW, Grand Rapids, Michigan
- Area: 0.8 acres (0.32 ha)
- Built: 1885
- Built by: W.D. Richardson
- Architect: Elijah E. Myers
- Architectural style: Gothic Revival
- Demolished: October 27, 1969
- NRHP reference No.: 69000375

Significant dates
- Added to NRHP: May, 1969
- Removed from NRHP: May 1, 1970

The Grand Rapids City Hall was a government building located at 35 Lyon Street, NW, in Grand Rapids, Michigan. It was added to the National Register of Historic Places in 1969, but demolished later that year, and de-listed from the register in 1970.

== History ==
The old Grand Rapids City Hall was designed by architect Elijah E. Myers. Construction began in 1885, supervised by W.D. Richardson of Springfield, Illinois. The building was dedicated in 1888, having cost $314,800 to construct. After extended efforts to save the building, it was demolished in 1969. At the same time the International Style current city hall was built at 300 Monroe Ave NW. In 2001, the current Kent County Courthouse was built on the former site, with a new clock tower outside the building.

== Description ==
The old Grand Rapids City Hall was a three- of four-story Gothic Revival structure with a six-story corner tower. The tower was capped with a belfry. The main structure was roughly rectangular, and measured approximately 96 feet by 163 feet. Slightly projecting pavilions were locate on each side. The building had a hipped roof with gables over the central pavilions and pyramidal roofs over corner pavilions. The exterior windows were arched and a cornice ran across the top. The interior had rich Gothic detail with a tiled floor.
