= Brinckerhoff Cemetery =

Historic cemetery and landmark in Queens, New York

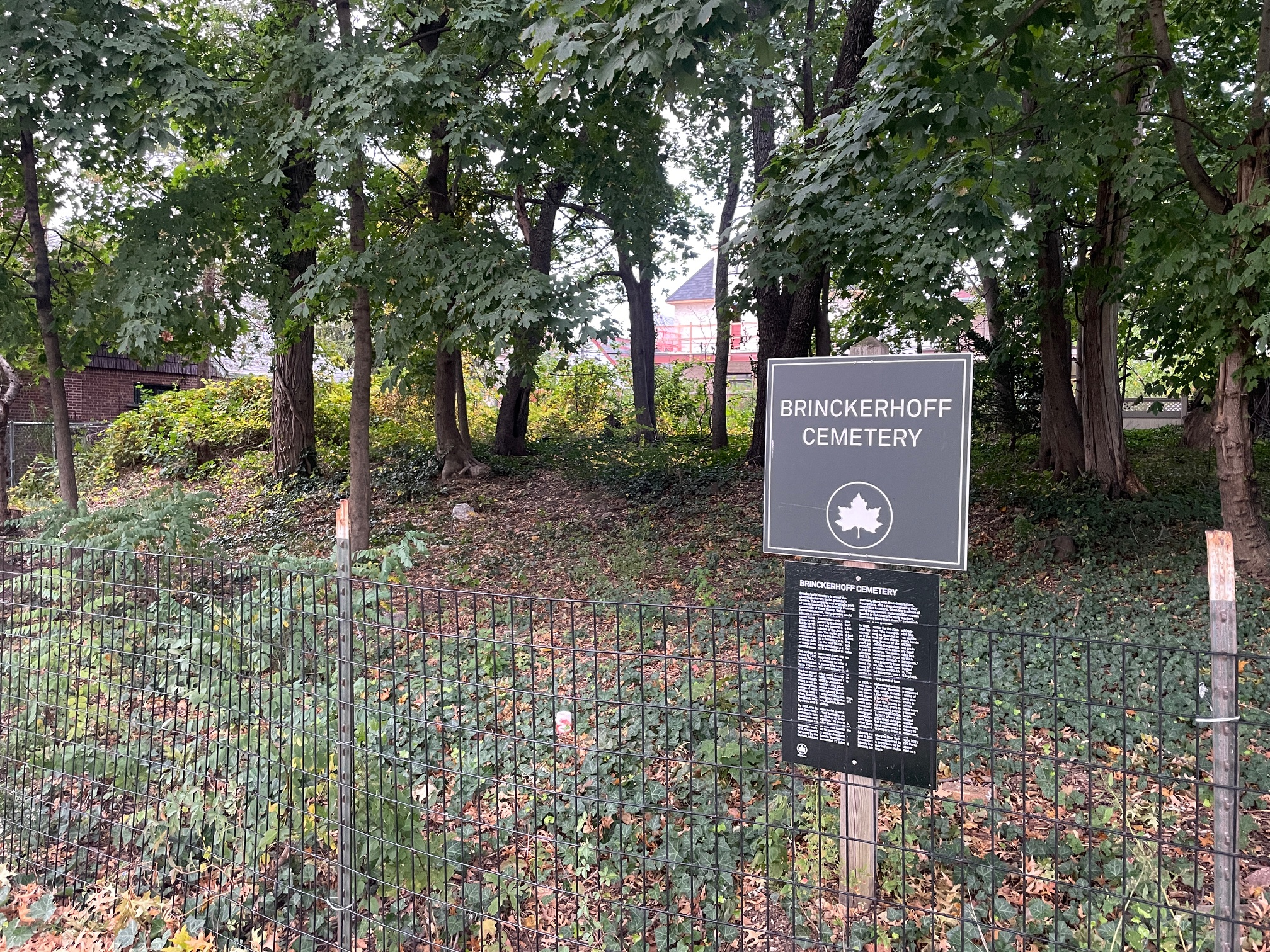
- View from 182nd street facing northeast.
- Interactive map of Brinckerhoff Cemetery

Details
- Established: Before 1730
- Location: Fresh Meadows, New York
- Country: US
- Coordinates: 40°43′55″N 73°47′18″W
- Owned by: NYC Parks
- No. of graves: More than 77
- Find a Grave: Brinckerhoff Cemetery

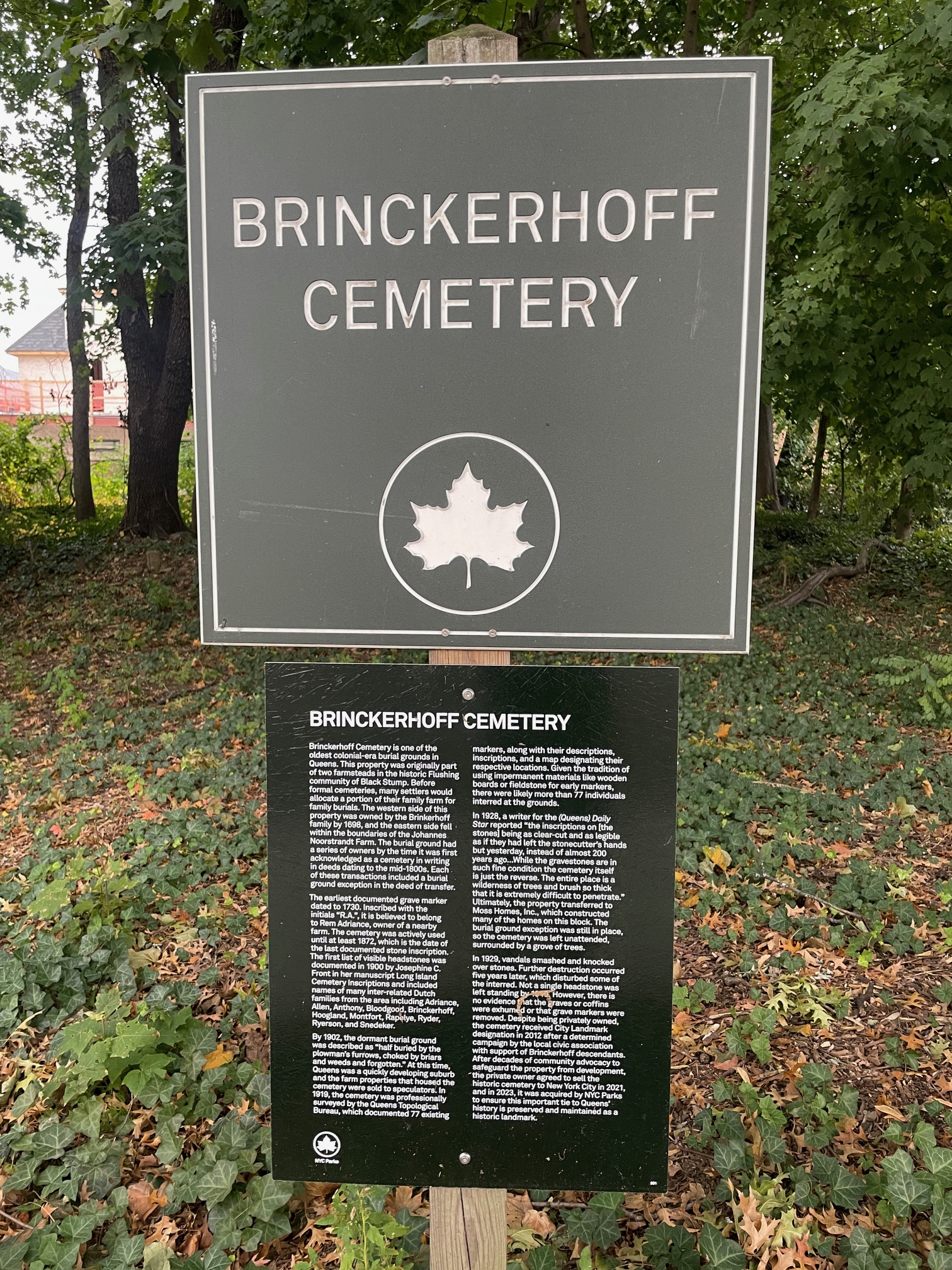
Sign installed by NYC Parks to describe the site for visitors located on the southwest corner of the cemetery facing 182nd street.

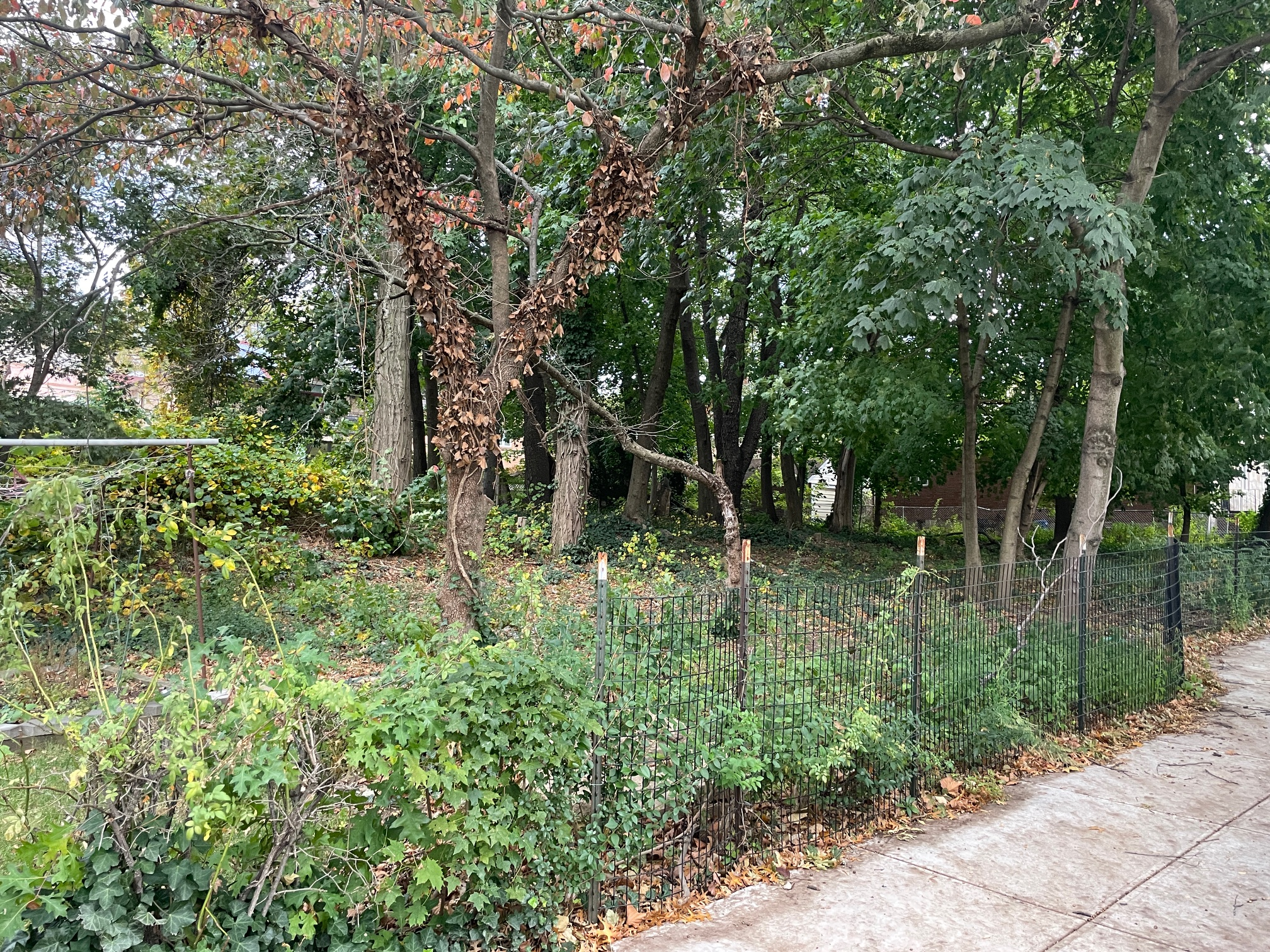
View from 182nd street facing southwest.

Brinckerhoff Cemetery (also called Black Stump Cemetery) is a colonial-era burial ground located in the Fresh Meadows neighborhood of Queens, New York City. It was primarily used by the Dutch settler families of the area, including the Brinckerhoff family, where the name originates. At least 77 burials have been documented on the site, but there are no extant gravestones.

== History ==
Brinckerhoff Cemetery was created sometime before 1730 as a family cemetery shared by local farmers and landowners. A 1919 survey identified 77 remaining gravestones dating between 1730 and 1872, but made no mention of whether or not the cemetery was actively used at that time. By 1900, burials were no longer occurring in the cemetery, and it was vandalized several times during the 20th century. In 1952, the City of New York declared the land abandoned, and it was sold at auction. The status of the site was a source of conflict for several decades as the land was unmaintained and remained undeveloped. Many attempts were made to obtain ownership of the land by parties who opposed its development on the grounds that the cemetery was historically significant.

In 2012, the New York City Landmarks Preservation Commission declared the site a landmark. Complaints about the site's cleanliness continued, and the debate over its ownership and administration was reinvigorated. in 2018 it was announced that a nonprofit called Friends of Brinckerhoff Colonial Cemetery was purchasing the land and would "work with the city and the Department of Parks and Recreation on a long-term plan for the cemetery and its continued maintenance." However, in 2023 it was reported that the land was owned by the New York City Department of Parks and Recreation and that the Fresh Meadows Homeowners Civic Association had recently lodged complaints about the site's maintenance.
