= Helen Newberry Nurses Home =

- U.S. National Register of Historic Places
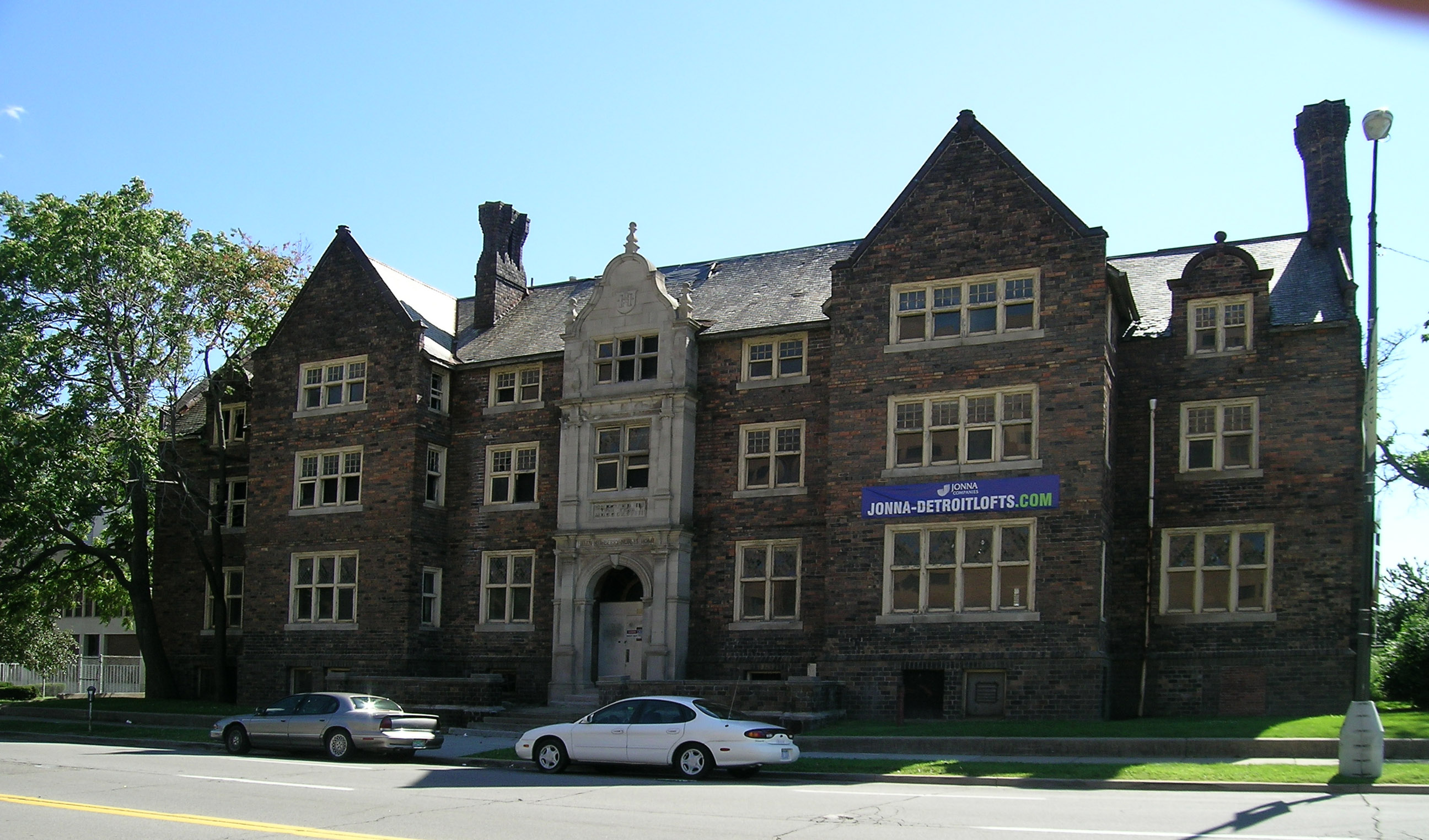
- Facade of the Helen Newberry Nurses Home facing John R. Street
- Interactive map
- Location: 100 East Willis Avenue; Detroit, Michigan
- Coordinates: 42°21′7.5″N 83°3′31.5″W
- Built: 1898
- Architect: Elijah E. Myers
- Architectural style: Jacobean Revival
- NRHP reference No.: 08000576
- Added to NRHP: July 03, 2008

The Helen Newberry Nurses Home is a multi-unit residential building located at 100 East Willis Avenue (at the corner of Willis and John R.) in Midtown Detroit, Michigan. It was listed on the National Register of Historic Places in 2008, and is now the Newberry Hall Apartments.

== History ==
Detroit's Grace Hospital opened in 1888; the next year Grace Hospital Training School for Nurses was opened under the direction of Eugenie Hibbard. The first class had fourteen students. Grace Hospital Training School was one of the first training schools for nurses in the United States. By 1898, it was recognized that student nurses needed nearby housing while attending the Training School. The Helen Newberry Nurses Home was built to house these nursing students. Funds to construct the building were donated by Helen Handy Newberry, wife of John Stoughton Newberry and mother of Truman Handy Newberry. Architect Elijah E. Myers designed the building.

The Helen Newberry Nurses Home housed nursing students from the time of its construction until Grace Hospital Training School closed its doors in 1968. It was afterward used in the 1980s as office space for the Detroit Medical Center. A fire in 2006 severely damaged some of the building's interior on the first floor. In 2011/2012 the building was renovated to house 28 apartments.

== Description ==
The Helen Newberry Nurses Home is a large three-story, L-shaped, red-and-brown brick Jacobean Revival residential building. The basement level is partially raised, and the roof is gabled and covered with slate. A three-story limestone entry bay projects slightly from the center of the main facade. Within this bay on the first floor is an arched entryway flanked with Doric pilasters, while the second story has two windows flanked with Ionic pilasters, and the third floor has a triple window. A small terrace with perimeter walls surrounds the entryway.

On either side of the entry bay, the facade is divided into three bays: a narrow recessed bay beside the entryway, a wider projecting cross-gabled bay adjacent, and another recessed bay at the outer end of the building. The outer bay on each side is surmounted by a brick Flemish dormer with stone cap. Although the facade is not entirely symmetrical, the projecting and recessed bays give the sense of balance. Basement windows are small three-by-three lights. Windows on the upper floors are all double hung, with diamond-paned leaded glass upper sashes on the first floor and on the entry bay, nine-over-one lights on the second floor, and six-over-one lights on the third floor. The windows are paired in most sections, but tripled or quadrupled in the projecting bays, and with single windows on the sides of the projecting bays.

Two massive corbelled ornamental brick chimney stacks rise through the roof, one on the right side of the building and one near the center. The remaining facades are less detailed than the front, although the window patterns are similar.

The interior of the structure has a central corridor in both the main section and the ell with rooms to either side. Stairs leads from the entryway up to the main corridor level, and two more stairways are located at each end of the building. The original building plan had a group of more decorative public rooms on the first floor, having arched openings, wall paneling, and decorative trim. More modest dormitory rooms took up the rest of the first floor and the upper floors.
