= Brinkerhoff House =

Historic building in New Jersey, US

- U.S. National Register of Historic Places
- New Jersey Register of Historic Places
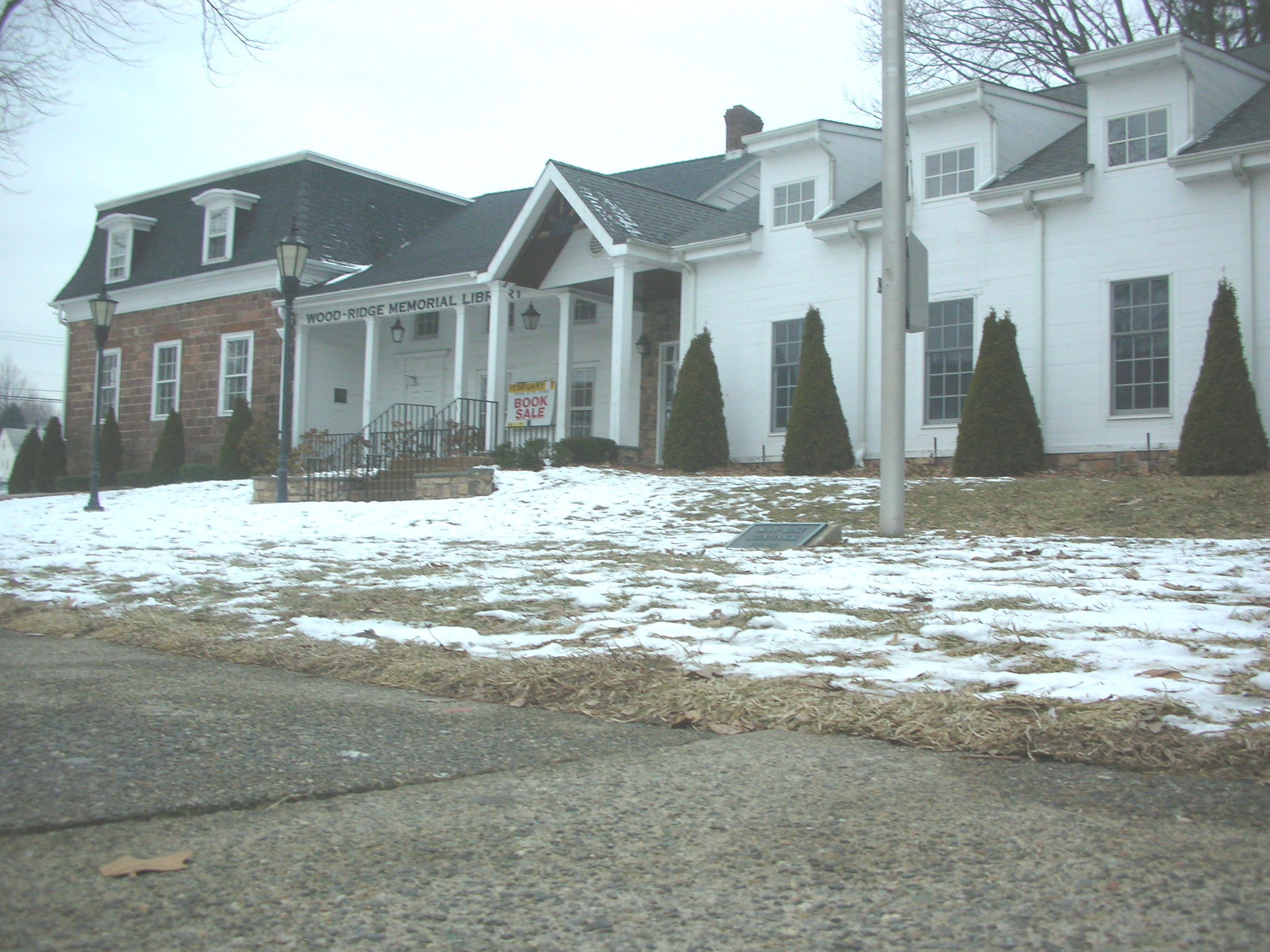

- Location within Bergen County, New Jersey Location within New Jersey Location within the United States
- Location: 231 Hackensack Road, Wood-Ridge, New Jersey
- Coordinates: 40°50′52″N 74°4′56″W
- Built: 1792
- Architect: George Brinkerhoff
- NRHP reference No.: 84002541
- NJRHP No.: 722

Significant dates
- Added to NRHP: July 24, 1984
- Designated NJRHP: October 3, 1980

The Brinkerhoff House is located in Wood-Ridge, Bergen County, New Jersey, United States. The building was originally constructed in 1792 by George Brinkerhoff. In the 1870s the house was remodeled by Henry E. Brinkerhoff. The house was renovated and turned into the Wood-Ridge Memorial Library in 1954 by Rutherford, NJ architect Edgar I. Williams. The house was renovated again and expanded in 2000. The house was added to the National Register of Historic Places on July 24, 1984.

== See also ==
- National Register of Historic Places listings in Bergen County, New Jersey
