= George M. Brinkerhoff House =

Historic house in Illinois, United States

- U.S. National Register of Historic Places
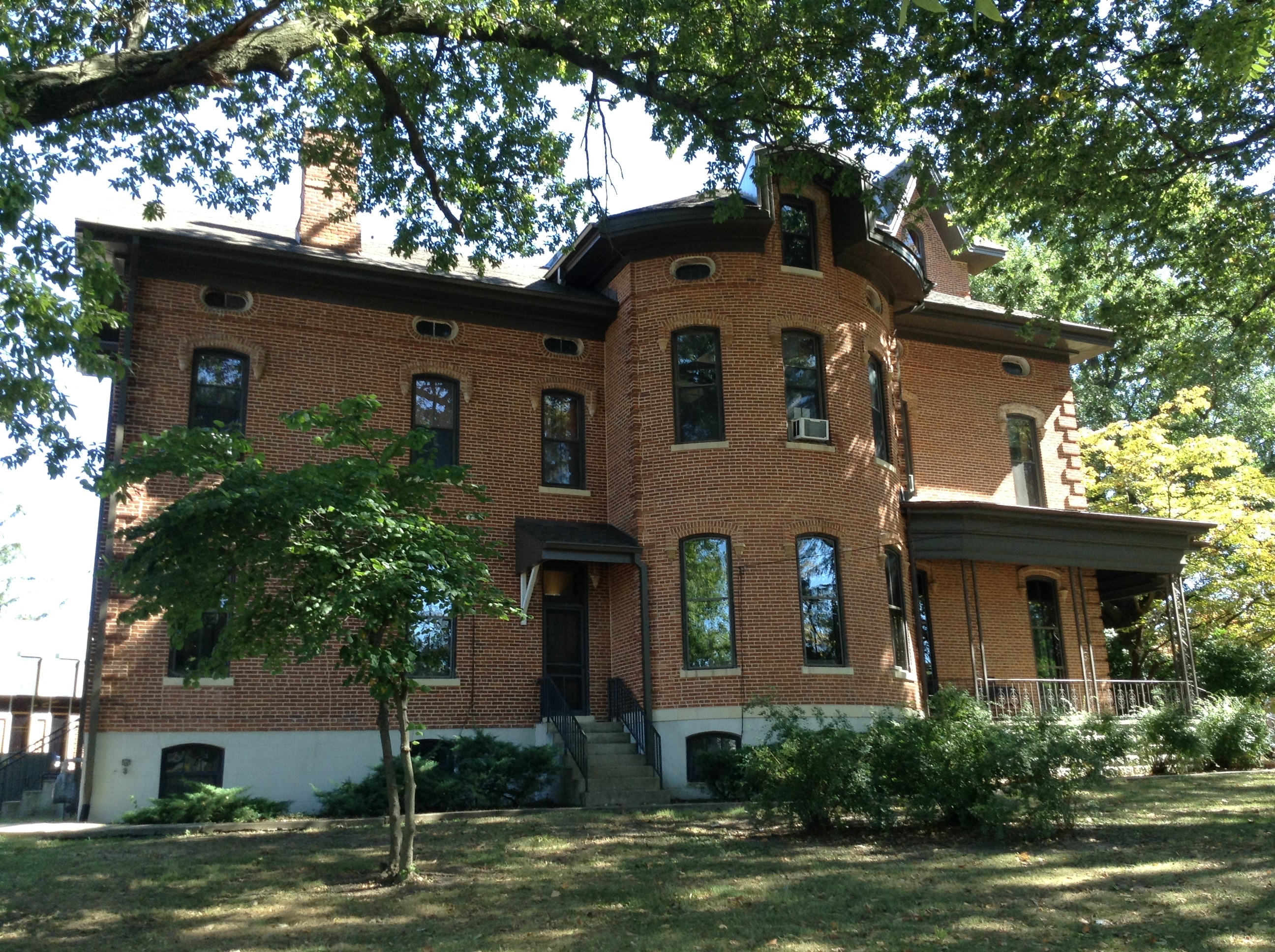

- Location within Illinois Location within the United States
- Location: 1500 N. 5th St., Springfield, Illinois
- Coordinates: 39°49′16″N 89°38′54″W
- Area: less than one acre
- Built: 1869-70
- Architect: Myers, Elijah E.
- Architectural style: Italian Villa
- NRHP reference No.: 78001186
- Added to NRHP: December 18, 1978

The George M. Brinkerhoff House is a historic house located at 1500 North 5th Street in Springfield, Illinois. Businessman George M. Brinkerhoff commissioned the house in 1869; it was completed the following year. Architect Elijah E. Myers designed the Italian Villa style house. The 2 1/2-story brick house features a Gothic-inspired tower on its southwest corner; the tower was originally four stories tall but was shortened in 1960. The house's design includes angled porches, brick quoins on the corners, bracketed eaves, a dentillated cornice, and Myers' signature ornamental rope trim. After Brinkerhoff died in 1928, Springfield College bought the house to serve as its main building.

The house was added to the National Register of Historic Places on December 18, 1978.
