= Brinkerhoff–Demarest House =

Historic house in New Jersey, United States

- U.S. National Register of Historic Places
- New Jersey Register of Historic Places
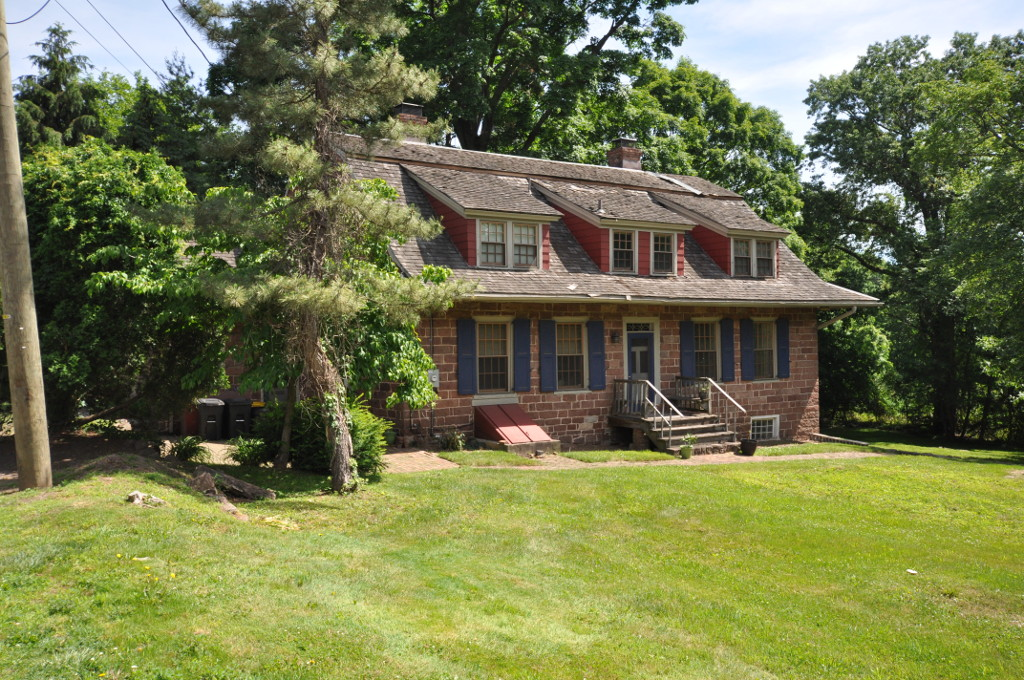
- The house in 2019

- Location within Bergen County, New Jersey Location within New Jersey Location within the United States
- Location: 493 Teaneck Road, Teaneck, New Jersey
- Coordinates: 40°52′34″N 74°0′43″W
- Built by: Hendricks Brinkerhoff
- MPS: Stone Houses of Bergen County TR
- NRHP reference No.: 83001478
- NJRHP No.: 698

Significant dates
- Added to NRHP: January 10, 1983
- Designated NJRHP: October 3, 1980

The Brinkerhoff–Demarest House is located at 493 Teaneck Road in the township of Teaneck in Bergen County, New Jersey, United States. The historic stone house was documented by the Historic American Buildings Survey (HABS) in 1936. It was added to the National Register of Historic Places on January 10, 1983, for its significance in architecture. It was listed as part of the Early Stone Houses of Bergen County Multiple Property Submission (MPS).

== History and description ==
According to the nomination form, the oldest part of the house was built from 1728 to 1735 by Hendrick Brinkerhoff. The main part was built from 1775 to 1800 based on architectural evidence. The Brinkerhoff family owned the property until 1829, when it was sold to Jaspar Demarest. The house was built with red sandstone.

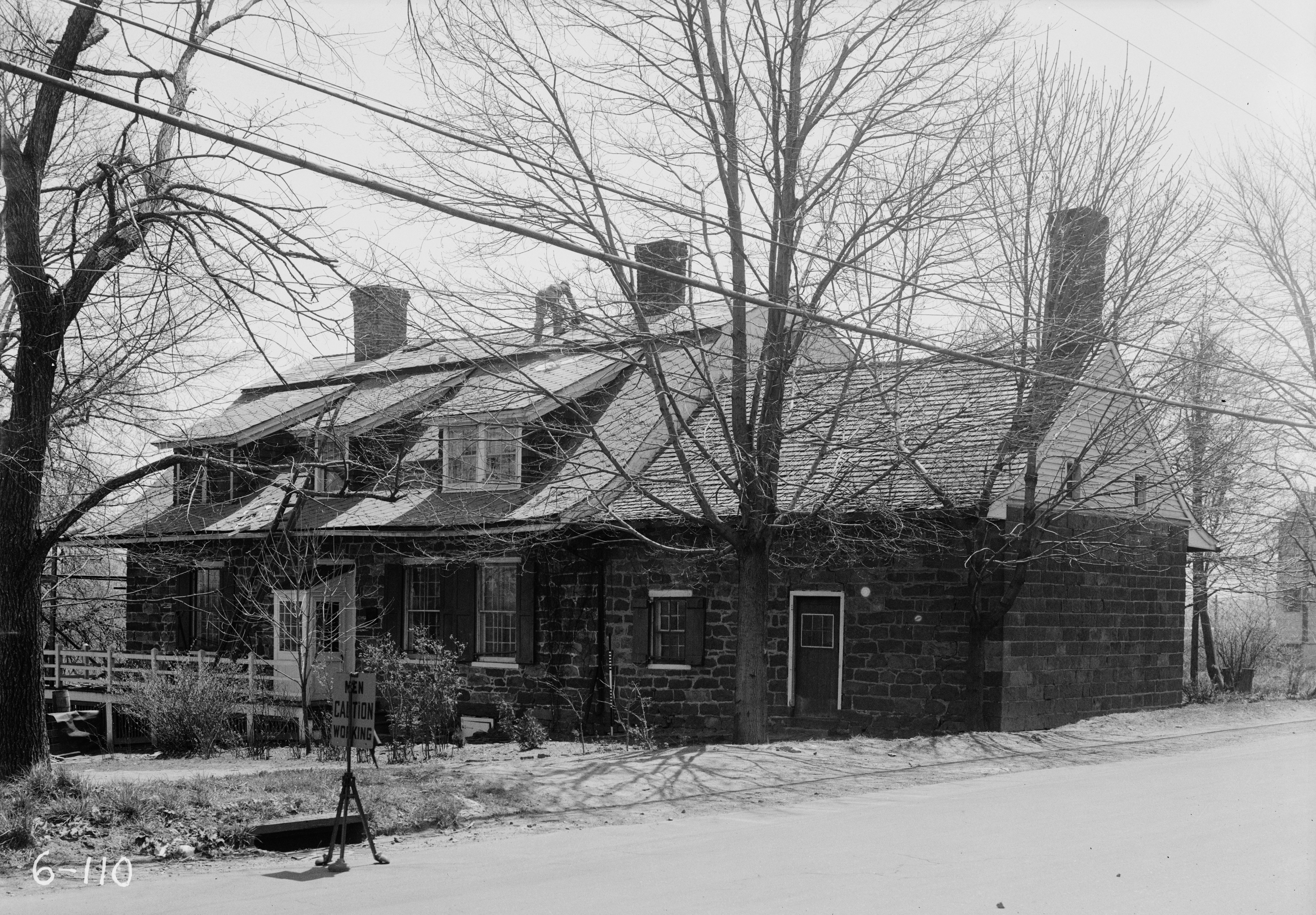
HABS photo from 1936

== See also ==
- National Register of Historic Places listings in Bergen County, New Jersey
