= Clara M. Brinkerhoff =

American singer and musical educator

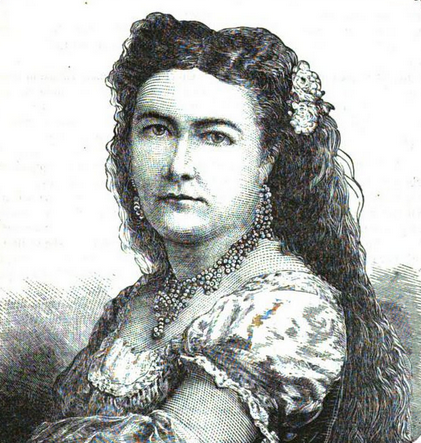
- Born: Clara Maria Rolph; 8 September 1828; London, England
- Died: Unknown
- Occupations: Singer, romance novelist
- Spouse: Charles E. L. Brinkerhoff (m. 1848)
- Writing career
- Pen name: Henri Gordon
- Language: English
- Genre: opera

Clara Maria Brinkerhoff (pseudonym, Henri Gordon; 8 September 1828 – Abt. 1913) was an English-born American singer and musical educator. She sang in public while still a child, her voice and culture attracting the attention of the highest and most critical circles. Her father, Mr. Rolph, would not consent to her going on stage as a professional singer, so only the occasional concert employed her voice when she was still young.

At the age of 17, she married Charles E. L. Brinkerhoff, of New York, and for three or four years after the marriage, in consideration of the wishes of her husband's family, she did not appear in concert. It was through the insistence of her manager, Theodore Eisfeld, that Brinkerhoff appeared again before the public, singing in concert and oratorio. Critics spoke of her voice as possessing phenomenal qualities and extraordinary power. Its unusual range and richness enabled her to cover a very wide scope of subject and author. While in oratorio she was superb, in opera, she was at home. With George Cumming, Brinkerhoff co-invented and patented an award-winning telegraph key.

== Early years and education ==
Clara Maria Rolph was born in London, England, 8 September 1828. She was the daughter of Mr. and Mrs. John A. Rolph who emigrated to the United States circa 1834-35. Her father was an artist, whose specialty was steel engraving. Her mother was an artistic, literary and musical woman, with a fine voice that had been trained in the old Italian school by Maestro Domenico Corri. The mother trained Brinkerhoff in singing from age five through twelve. After the death of the mother, Brinkerhoff's musical education was continued under Henry Derwort, who tried to persuade her to go on the stage in grand opera, but respect for her dead mother's wishes kept her from an operatic career. She next studied with Mr. Chadwick, a teacher of ballad and English song. Her next instructor was Mme. Arnault, a pupil of Marco Bordogni, who prepared her for her debut on the concert stage. She took lessons in oratorio music from George Loder, conductor of the Philharmonic Society, and also studied with Mrs. Edward Loder, an oratorio singer.

== Career ==
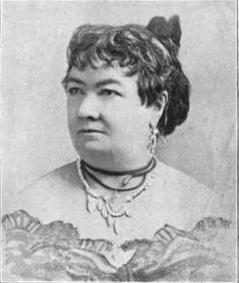
Clara M. Brinkerhoff

At the age of 16, Brinkerhoff made her debut under the direction of Henry Meiggs, President of the American Musical Institute, at a concert given in Apollo Hall, on Broadway, with marked success. In her first musical season, she had the principal parts in The Seven Sleepers, Waldenses, Judas Maccabaeus, Lobgesang, and Louis Spohr's The Last Judgment. Afterwards, she appeared in Elijah, Athalia and Stabat Mater, and in classical concerts from Gluck, Beethoven, Mozart, Haydn and Wagner, with a full repertoire of the best Italian composers. She gave in New York City and other places a remarkable series of vocal recitals, comprising portrayals of the best compositions, planned and executed by herself, with no assistance beyond piano-forte accompaniment.

Brinkerhoff was the soprano of Grace Church at the time of her marriage, and sang the full Christmas service on the morning of her wedding day. She married Charles E. L. Brinkerhoff on 25 December 1848. She sang in concerts in many cities of the United States and abroad. In 1861, she visited Europe, where she received positive attention. Among the acquaintances she made there was that with Auber, who admitted her as an auditor to all vocal classes in the Paris Conservatoire, where she made a critical study of the different methods pursued in training. In Paris, she was urged to sing in grand opera, but refused. As a singer, she was master of the methods of the English, French, German and Italian schools. Her voice was a rich soprano with a range of nearly three octaves.

Brinkerhoff lived in New York City, where she was the first to teach the rudiments of music and sightsinging in the public schools of the City of New York. She taught for six months in the girls’ department in the Thirteenth Street School a class of 300 girls. She refers to this phase of her career with greater pride than to any other of her achievements, for she was among the first, if not the first, to demonstrate the feasibility of teaching music to large classes of children by use of the blackboard, etc.

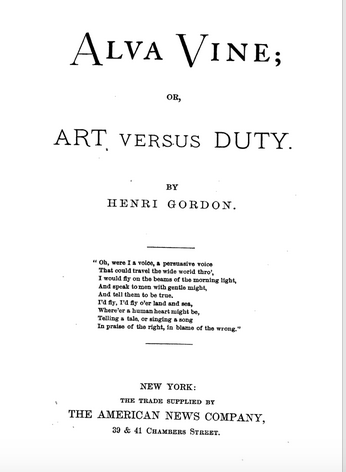
Alva Vine (1880)

Besides her talents and accomplishments as a singer, she was a composer, and was the author of a number of songs. One of the song, “One Flag or No Flag," had a large sale during the American Civil War. She lectured before the polytechnic section of the American Institute. Her skill as a romance novelist is demonstrated with her book, Alva Vine: Art Versus Duty, under the pseudonym "Henri Gordon". With George Cumming, Brinkerhoff co-invented and patented an award-winning telegraph key in 1882. They established the firm of Cumming & Brinkerhoff where they sold the key and design.

== Personal life ==
Clara married December 25, 1948, in Bushwick, Charles Edgar Laing Brinkerhoff (1823–1900), who was of Spanish descent. They had one child, a son, Charles Rolph Brinkerhoff (c. 1850–1893),

== Selected works ==
- Gordon, Henri (pseudonym of Clara Maria Brinkerhoff) (1880). Alva Vine; or, Art Versus Duty. New York: The American News Company. LCCN 06-27485; OCLC 1512929302 (all editions).
1. Via HathiTrust (Harvard).
2. Via Google Books (Harvard).

Musical scores

- The nation's hymn, 1865
- Clarita : romanza, 1864
- Love, 1854
- On flag or no flag, 1864
- Annie Laurie, between 1858 and 1875

== Bibliography ==
=== Attributed references ===
- This article incorporates text from this source, which is in the public domain: Brown, James Duff (1886). Biographical Dictionary of Musicians: With a Bibliography of English Writings on Music (Public domain ed.). A. Gardner. p. 116.
- This article incorporates text from this source, which is in the public domain: Jones, F. O. (1887). A Handbook of American Music and Musicians: Containing Biographies of American Musicians and Histories of the Principal Musical Institutions, Firms and Societies (Public domain ed.). C.W. Moulton & Company.
- This article incorporates text from this source, which is in the public domain: Staten Island Academy, New Brighton, N.Y. Arthur Winter Memorial Library (1906). Catalogue, 1906 (Public domain ed.). Holywell press. p. 27.
- This article incorporates text from this source, which is in the public domain: Wells, Samuel R. (1877). The Phrenological Journal and Life Illustrated. Vol. 64 (Public domain ed.). Samuel R. Wells.
- This article incorporates text from this source, which is in the public domain: Werner, Edgar S. (1896). Werner's Magazine. Vol. 18 (Public domain ed.). E.S. Werner.
- This article incorporates text from this source, which is in the public domain: Werner's Magazine Company (1900). Werner's Magazine: A Magazine of Expression. Vol. 25 (Public domain ed.). Werner's Magazine Company.

=== References ===
- Genealogical Publishing Company (1987). Index to Marriages and Deaths in the New York Herald: 1835-1855. Genealogical Publishing Company. ISBN 978-0-8063-1184-5.
- Stanley, Autumn (1995). Mothers and Daughters of Invention: Notes for a Revised History of Technology. Rutgers University Press. ISBN 978-0-8135-2197-8.
- Willard, Frances Elizabeth Caroline; Livermore, Mary Ashton, eds. (1893). "Brinkerhoff, Mme. Clara M., Singer". A Woman of the Century – Fourteen Hundred-Seventy Biographical Sketches – Accompanied by Portraits of Leading American Women in All Walks of Life (with Preface). "Assisted by a corps of able contributors". Buffalo, Chicago, New York: Charles Wells Moulton. OCLC 1402400639 (all editions).

See Wikipedia article: A Woman of the Century.

1. Via HathiTrust (4 archival sources).
2. Via Internet Archive (Illinois).
3. Via Google Books (Harvard).
4. Via Wikimedia Commons (Illinois).
