= Abraham Brinkerhoff =

American trader, merchant, and patriot (1745–1823)

Abraham Jorise Brinkerhoff
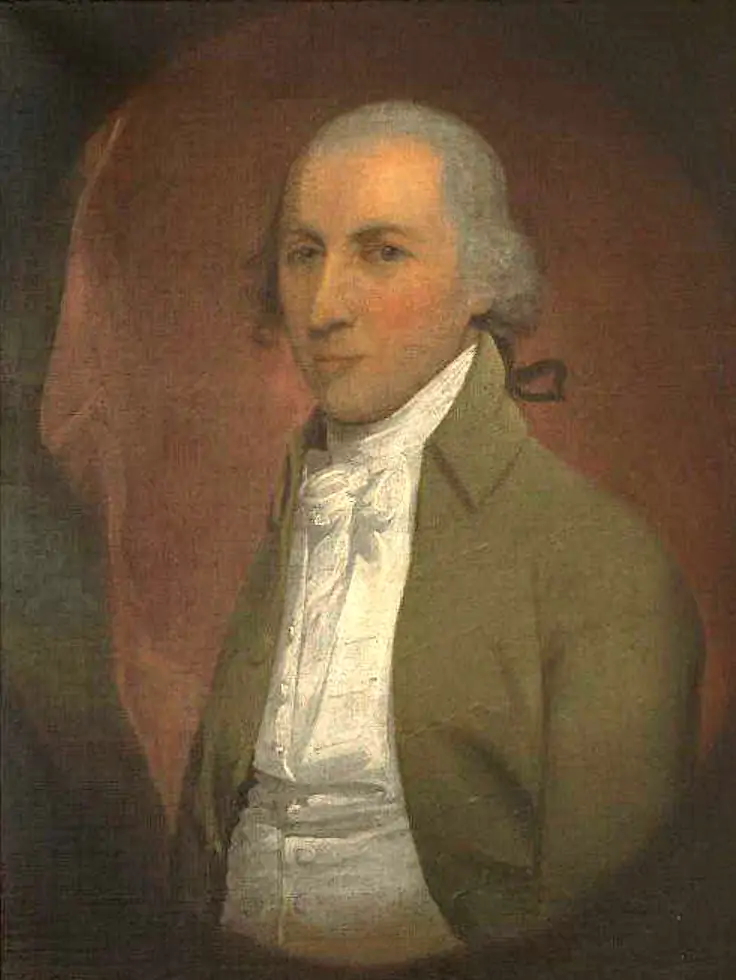
- Contemporary depiction of Brinkerhoff

Member of the Committee of One Hundred
- In office May 1, 1775 – May 23, 1775
- Preceded by: Office established
- Succeeded by: Office abolished

Personal details
- Born: July 22, 1745 Brooklyn, New York
- Died: March 7, 1823 (aged 77) Brooklyn, New York

Abraham Jorise Brinkerhoff (July 22, 1745 – March 7, 1823), also known as Abraham Brinckerhoff, was an American trader, merchant, and patriot, known for his reported involvement in the Committee of One Hundred. The Committee, composed largely of New York traders and merchants, was established in 1775 for the sake of organizing resistance against British rule during the Revolution.

== Background ==
Abraham Brinkerhoff was born in New York City on July 22, 1745, the baptized taking place there on July 24, 1745. His parents were Joris Brinkerhoff and Maria Van Deusen (or Van Deursen); Abraham's great-great-grandfather, Joris Dircksen Brinckerhoff, was a Dutchman who settled in Brooklyn in 1638.

== Committee of One Hundred ==
A passionate advocate for the rebel cause, Brinkerhoff was said to have been a member of the Committee of One Hundred. As a well-established trader and merchant, he joined this group of likewise people aimed at "taking possession" of New York City to promote American independence. Their first actions included seizing ships and weapons in anticipation of the impending conflict. The Committee also implemented measures to disarm Loyalists with commercial ties.

== Later life and death ==
In 1815, Abraham had $50,000 in personal property taxed, which increased to $60,000 in 1820. The tax records from 1822 indicate that he resided at 34 Broadway, where his house was valued at $11,000 and his personal property at $60,000.

Brinkerhoff died on the morning of March 7, 1823, at his residence in New York at age 78.

== Bibliography ==
=== References ===
- Green-Wood Cemetery Administration (May 24, 2024). "Revolutionary War Biographies" → "Brinkerhoff (or Brinckerhoff), Abraham (1745-1823)". Brooklyn. Archived from the original on October 7, 2024.
- Lanier, Henry Wysham (1873–1958) (1922). A Century of Banking in New York, 1822–1922. New York: George H. Doran Company. LCCN 39-1065, LCCN 99-3723; OCLC 2749828 (all editions).
1. "Brinckerhoff, Abraham". p. 97 – via Internet Archive (San Francisco Public Library).
- New-York Evening Post (The). LCCN sn83-30385, LCCN sn83-30388, LCCN sn83-30384; ISSN 2638-2199; OCLC 9485473 (all editions), OCLC 2260927 (all editions).
1. "Died" (... Mr. Abraham Brinckerhoff ...") (issue [whole] no. 6452). March 7, 1823. p. 2 (column 5, bottom half) – via Newspapers.com.
