= WSP USA =

Engineering and design firm founded 1885

- Type: Subsidiary
- Industry: Design, Engineering consulting, Environment consulting, Project management
- Founded: 1885 (as Parsons Brinckerhoff)
- Founder: William Barclay Parsons (1885)
- Headquarters: One Penn Plaza, New York City, United States
- Number of locations: New York, London, Dubai, Hong Kong, Singapore, Sydney and approximately 150 other offices worldwide
- Area served: Global
- Key people: Lewis Cornell, President and CEO, U.S.
- Products: Strategic consulting, planning, design, program management, engineering, construction services and operations & maintenance
- Number of employees: Approximately 14,000 worldwide
- Parent: WSP Global
- Website: www.wsp.com/en-us

WSP USA, formerly Parsons Brinckerhoff, is an American multinational engineering and design firm. The firm operates in the fields of strategic consulting, planning, engineering, construction management, energy, infrastructure and community planning. It is a subsidiary of WSP Global.

In 2013, the company was named the tenth largest U.S.-based engineering/design firm by Engineering News Record. In 2020, it was ranked #7 of the Top 500 Design Firms and #2 of the Top 100 Pure Designers by the same magazine. On October 31, 2014, Parsons Brinckerhoff became a wholly owned independent subsidiary of WSP Global, a Canadian-based professional services firm. Parsons Brinckerhoff was renamed to WSP|Parsons Brinckerhoff, then to WSP in 2017. Part of WSP Global, WSP USA is one of the largest professional services firms in the world, with approximately 31,500 employees in 500 offices serving 39 countries.

== History ==
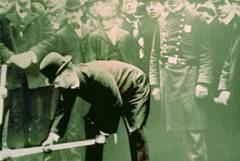
Chief Engineer William Barclay Parsons and the NYC Subway

Founded in 1885 in New York City by civil engineer William Barclay Parsons, among Parsons Brinckerhoff's earliest projects was the original IRT line of the New York City Subway, designed by Parsons Brinckerhoff and opened in 1904. Parsons Brinckerhoff also designed the Cape Cod Canal, which opened in 1914 and charted the course of a railway in China from Hankow (Wuhan) to Canton (Guangzhou), a line that is also still in use today. In 1906, Henry M. Brinckerhoff, a highway engineer, brought his expertise in electric railways to the firm. He is known for his co-invention of the third rail.

The firm has worked on some of the most notable infrastructure projects of the 20th century, including: the Detroit–Windsor Tunnel (1930); the Scheldt Tunnel in Antwerp, Belgium (1933); The Buzzards Bay Railroad Bridge on Cape Cod, Massachusetts (1935); The 1939 World's Fair in New York City; the Garden State Parkway in New Jersey (1957); the Hampton Roads Bridge-Tunnel in Virginia (1957); the Pell Bridge in Newport, Rhode Island (1969); the Strategic Petroleum Reserve (United States) (1980); the Fort McHenry Tunnel on I-95 (1980); the Cumberland Gap Tunnel on US 25E at the Tennessee–Kentucky state line, the H-3 Highway in Oahu, Hawaii (1997); the Sabiya Power Station in Kuwait (2000) and the rapid transit systems of San Francisco (1972); Atlanta (1979); Singapore (1987); Taipei (1996); and Caracas (1983).

Parsons Brinckerhoff was acquired by Balfour Beatty in October 2009 and operated as a wholly owned subsidiary of the Balfour Beatty plc. In October 2010 Balfour Beatty acquired Halsall Associates, which became a subsidiary of Parsons Brinckerhoff and part of its Canadian operations.

=== Acquisitions ===
Former logo of WSP Parsons Brinckerhoff

On September 3, 2014, WSP Global offered to purchase Parsons Brinckerhoff from Balfour Beatty plc for US$1.24 billion. The transaction closed on October 31, 2014 and Parsons Brinckerhoff became a wholly owned subsidiary of WSP Global. On January 10, 2017, it was announced that the brand Parsons Brinckerhoff would be retired and combined into the parent company, WSP Global.

In 2018, WSP Global bought Louis Berger Group for $400 million, then merged the U.S. operations of Louis Berger Group with WSP USA.

WSP USA acquired two US-based environmental consulting firms: Ecology & Environment (E & E) in 2019, and LT Environmental in 2020.

WSP purchased Golder Associates in 2021, Wood PLC’s Environment & Infrastructure Solutions, Inc. business in 2022.

== Current projects ==
The firm is involved in Long Island Rail Road's East Side Access to Grand Central Terminal in New York City, with a planned opening of December 2022. It is also involved with the redevelopment of LaGuardia Airport in New York City, announced in 2015, with an expected completion date of 2022. In 2018, it was selected as the lead firm for the Charlotte Douglas International Airport Airfield Expansion, with a targeted completion of 2022. It is working on the new Dallas Fort Worth International Airport Southwest End-Around Taxiway, with an expected completion date of 2021. In 2018, it started working on a master plan update for San Antonio International Airport.

== Controversies ==
Parsons Brinckerhoff partnered with rival engineering firm Bechtel to build the troubled Big Dig in Boston, Massachusetts. The Big Dig, or Central Artery/Tunnel project as it was officially known, was intended to replace an elevated Interstate freeway and connecting roads with a tunnel system underneath Boston. The project was beset with bad engineering, shoddy workmanship, and the death of an automobile passenger as a poor ceiling design caused a tunnel roof section to collapse on a car in the tunnel, crushing the victim. The Big Dig was years over schedule and engineering costs to several times of Bechtel/Parsons Brinckerhoff's original estimates, from $8 Billion to in excess of $24 Billion. Due to the poor construction, it has been estimated that the Big Dig's life span will be far short of the original specification that taxpayers paid for. The tunnels still have "thousands of leaks" and substandard materials. Subsequent to the fatal tunnel ceiling collapse, light fixtures have been found to have been incorrectly installed and corroding, posing a risk of failure and falling to the tunnel roadway.

Parsons Brinckerhoff was also the lead engineering firm to build the Silver Spring, Maryland transportation center. Despite a ballooning budget and a project that has run far behind schedule, the transit center was poorly constructed and has not become operational due to poor design and workmanship. In April 2014, The Washington Post published an exposé on Parsons Brinckerhoff's troubled transit center, reporting that an independent report has found that the public would be at risk due to falling concrete and needs a significant redesign and upgrades.

Parsons Brinckerhoff was part of a lawsuit for Lane Cove Tunnel, Sydney, Australia. The claim by AMP Capital Investors for Australian $144 million was settled in September 2014. The basis of the claim was 'Misleading and defective conduct' but the settlement is on confidential terms with no admission of liability.
