= Elijah E. Myers =

American architect (1832–1909)

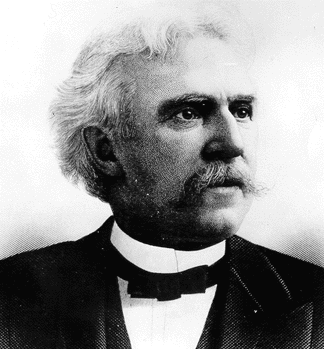
- Elijah E. Myers
- Born: December 29, 1832; Philadelphia, Pennsylvania, U.S.
- Died: March 5, 1909 (aged 76); Detroit, Michigan, U.S.
- Occupation: Architect
- Notable work: Michigan State Capitol • Texas State Capitol • Colorado State Capitol

Elijah E. Myers (December 29, 1832 – March 5, 1909) was an American architect of government buildings in the latter half of the 19th century, and the architect of three state capitols: the Michigan State Capitol, the Texas State Capitol, and the Colorado State Capitol. He also designed buildings in Mexico and Brazil. Myers favored Victorian Gothic and Neo-Classical styles, but he worked in other styles as well.

== Biography ==
He was born on December 29, 1832, in Philadelphia, the second largest city in the country, at the time. Historians suggest Myers may have studied architecture under Samuel Sloan before serving in the Civil War. On March 24, 1860, Myers married Mary Haines, the daughter of a prominent businessman, John Haines. The Myers family raised five children.

In 1863, Elijah and Mary decided to move westward, settling in Springfield, Illinois, where they lived for nine years. In 1872, they moved to Detroit while Myers was working on the Michigan State Capitol, where they remained. In 1881, he won the competition for the best design for the new Texas capitol in Austin. He was paid $12,000 USD ($289,000 in 2018) to be the project's architect, and the capitol cost $3,700,000 USD to build. Other examples of his work are the parliament buildings in Rio de Janeiro, the asylum building in Mexico City, as well as multiple courthouses, churches, hospitals, and city halls throughout the United States.

Myers had conflicts with fellow architects, who he claimed stole his designs and sued, and sometimes his clients. He was fired from the Texas Capitol project in 1886 over complaints that he was not giving enough attention to the project, and his design was subsequently changed. He was also fired from the Colorado State Capitol project and the Howell Library project, apparently in disputes about money.

In 1879, Myers sued Edwin May, the architect of a new Indiana State House, claiming that elements of design were stolen. Myers lost the lawsuit.

In 1891, Myers applied for the position of Supervising Architect of the U.S. Treasury but another was chosen.

During the Chicago World's Fair in 1893, Myers served on the Board of Examiners for the fair's buildings.

Myers died at home in Detroit on March 5, 1909. The day following his death, his obituary was shown in The New York Times. The only known portrait of Myers hangs in the Elijah Myers room of the Michigan State Capitol.

He was buried in Woodlawn Cemetery. His grave was unmarked until 2009, when funds were raised and a memorial erected by the Elijah E. Myers Memorial Commission.

== Legacy ==
On January 5, 1914, the Supreme Court decided Radford v. Myers, 231 U.S. 725 (1914), in favor of Myers’ estate. The case was a business dispute between Myers and his attorney, George W. Radford, involving litigation about the unbuilt Luzerne County Courthouse.

== Works ==
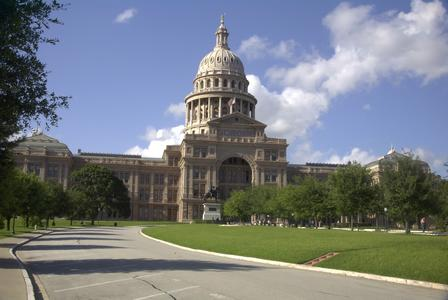
Texas State Capitol

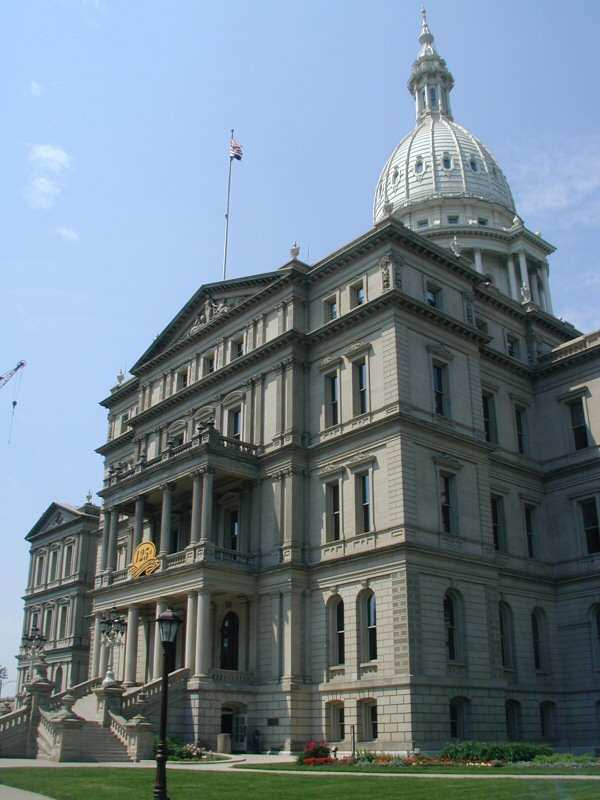
The Michigan State Capitol

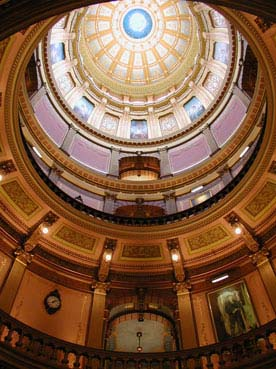

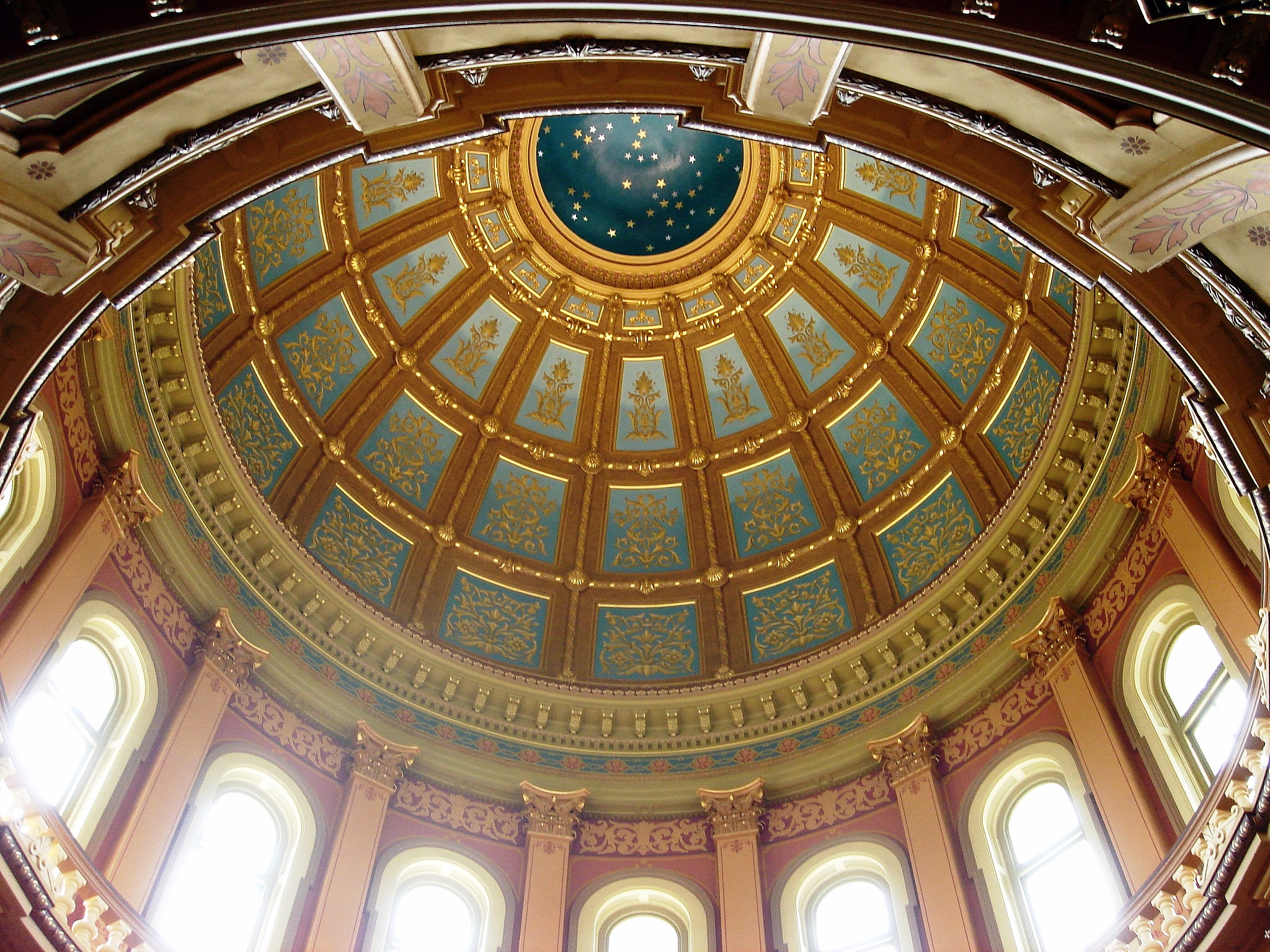
Interior of the Michigan capitol dome

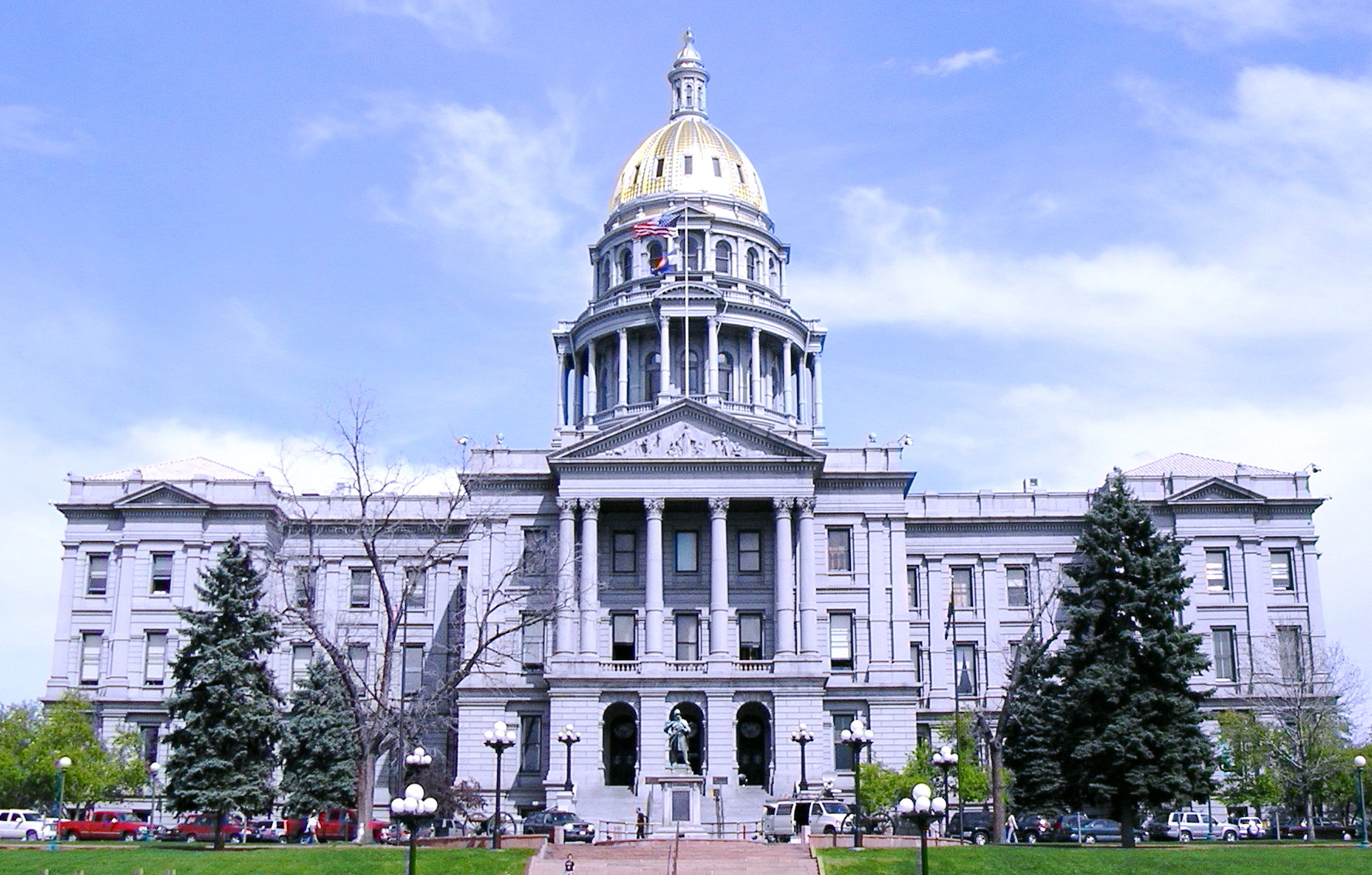
Colorado State Capitol

- Lincoln Memorial, 1868 (unbuilt)
- George M. Brinkerhoff Mansion, Springfield, Illinois, 1869
- Macoupin County Courthouse, Carlinville, Illinois, 1870
- Michigan State Capitol, Lansing, Michigan, 1872
- First Presbyterian Church, Albion, Michigan, c. 1873 (burned 1883, but the shell was incorporated in the replacement)
- President's House, Michigan State University, East Lansing, Michigan, 1874 (demolished 1940s)
- Grosvernor House, Jonesville, Michigan, 1874
- Lansing High School, Lansing, Michigan, 1875 (demolished summer 2006)
- Residence of William A Butler, 811 W Lafayette, Detroit, Mi.
- Residence of Philo Parsons, 2966 Woodward Avenue, Detroit, MI.
- Plymouth Congregational Church, 1877 (burned, 1971)
- Eastern Michigan Asylum for the Insane (Clinton Valley Center), Pontiac, Michigan, c. 1878 (demolished, 2000)
- Grant County Courthouse, Marion, Indiana, c. 1880 (dome removed)
- Lorain County Courthouse, Elyria, Ohio, c. 1881 - same design as Grant County, Indiana (dome also removed)
- Texas State Capitol, Austin, Texas, 1881
- Harper Hospital, Detroit, Michigan, 1883 (demolished in 1977)
- Knox County Courthouse, Galesburg, Illinois, 1885
- Idaho Territorial Capitol, c. 1885
- Colorado State Capitol, Denver, Colorado, 1885
- Seneca County Courthouse, Tiffin, Ohio, c. 1886 (demolition started 1/4/2012; to be completed by 2/1/2012) - Live Demo Cam
- (Old) City Hall, Richmond, Virginia, c. 1887
- Central United Methodist Church, Lansing, Michigan, 1888
- Grand Rapids City Hall, Grand Rapids, Michigan, 1888 (demolished 1960s)
- Alumni Hall, Knox College, Galesburg, Illinois, 1890
- San Joaquin County Courthouse, Stockton, California, c. 1891 (demolished 1961)
- Stockbridge Town Hall, Stockbridge, Michigan, 1892
- Grand Rapids Police Headquarters, Grand Rapids, Michigan, 1892 (demolished 1960s)
- Columbia Buildings, World's Columbian Exposition, Chicago, Illinois, c. 1890 (demolished)
- Asylum, Mexico City, Mexico, ante 1893
- Brazilian Parliament Building, Rio de Janeiro, Brazil, ante 1893 (demolished)
- Luzerne County Courthouse, Wilkes-Barre, Pennsylvania, 1894 (unbuilt)
- Bay City City Hall, Bay City, Michigan, 1897
- Helen Newberry Nurses Home, Detroit, Michigan, 1898
- Howell Carnegie District Library, Howell, Michigan, 1902
- McDonough County Courthouse, Macomb, Illinois
- Stephenson County Courthouse, Freeport, Illinois
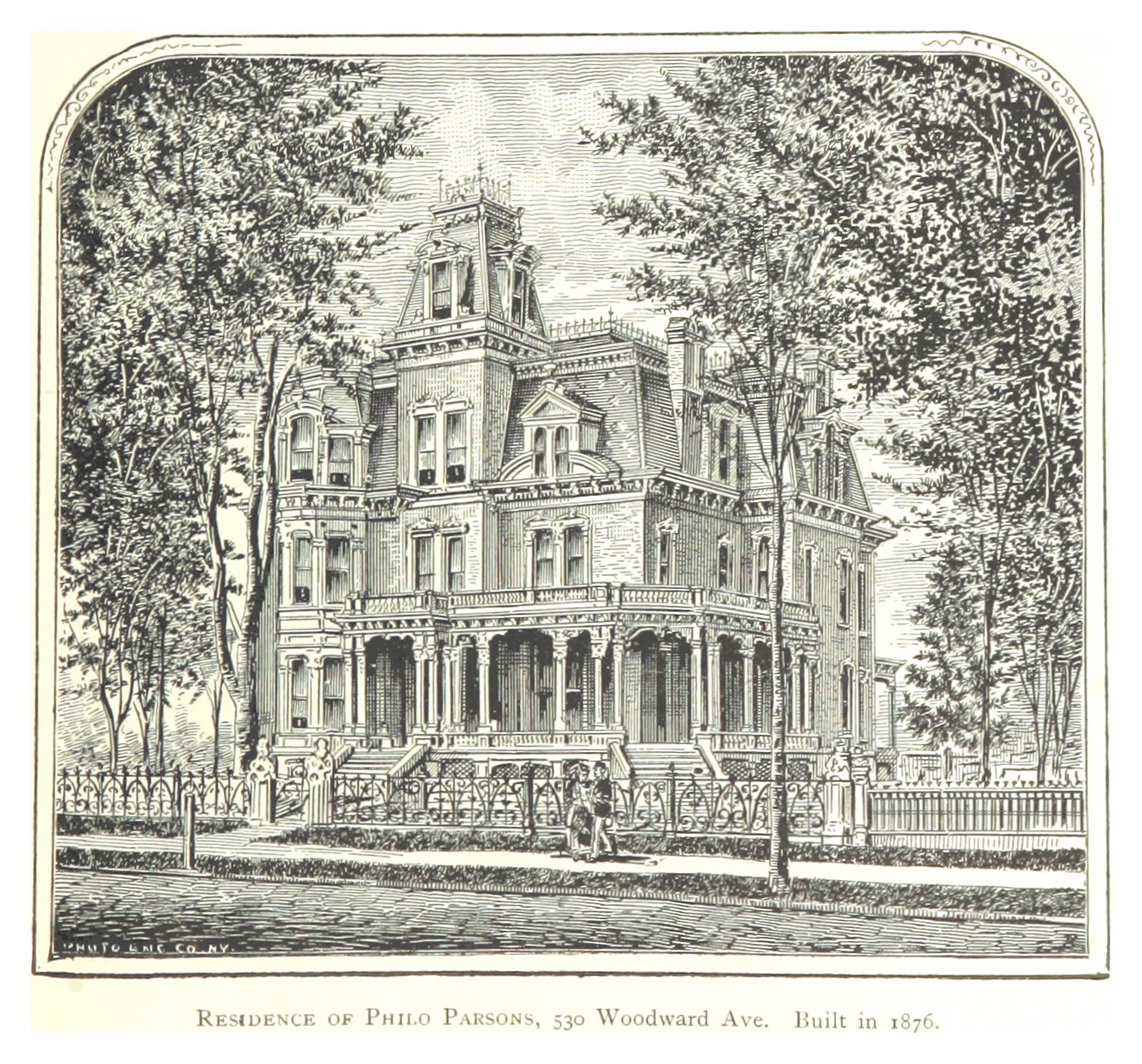
- Residence of Philo Parsons built in 1876.
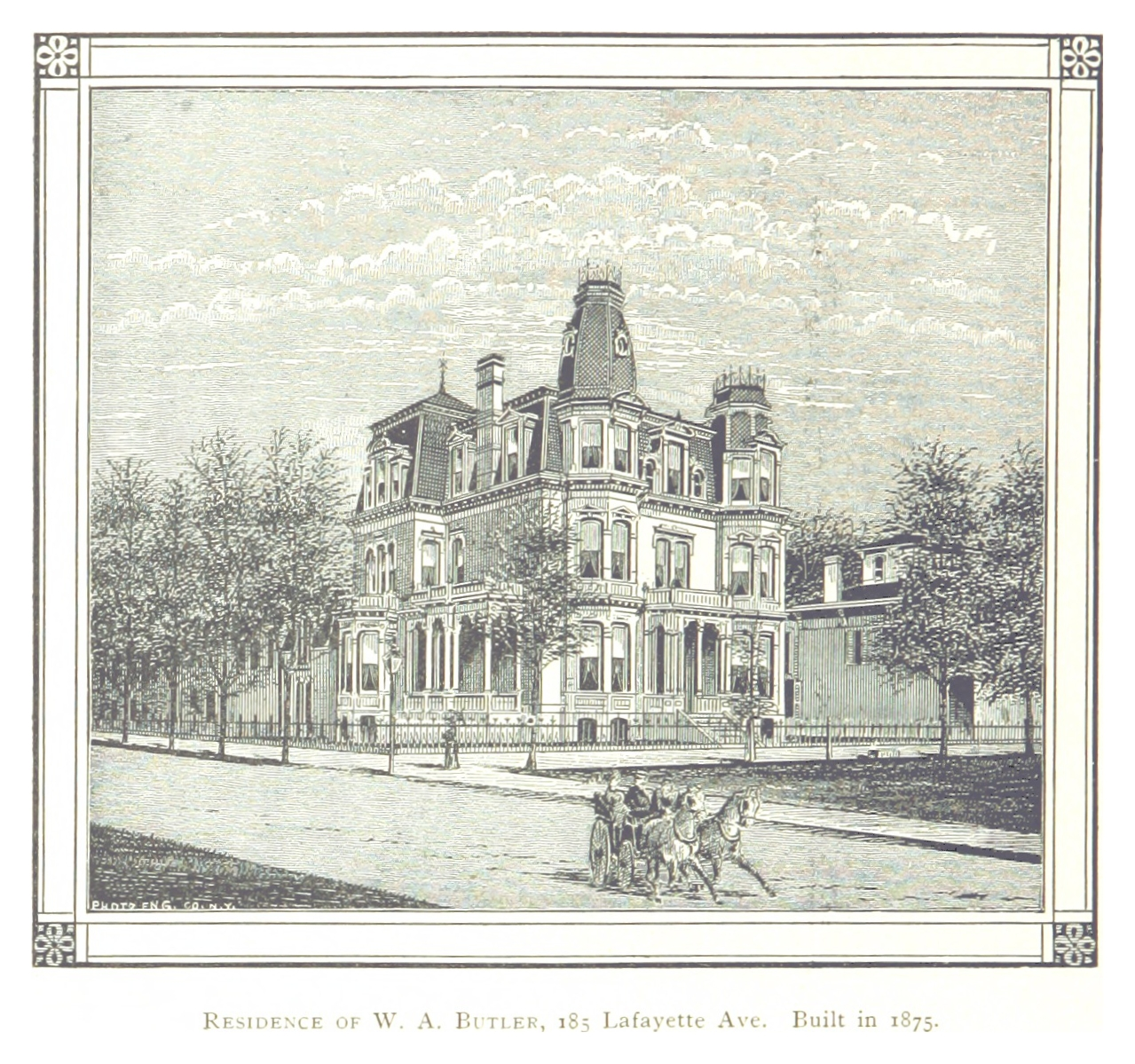
  Residence of William A Butler built in 1875.
  Silverton Miner's Union Hospital 1907, Silverton, Colorado, under restoration 2014

== Other sources ==
- Asylum: Pontiac's Grand Monument from the Gilded Age, Bruce J. Annett Jr., ISBN 0-9719141-0-9
- "A Michigan Architect in Indiana: Elijah E. Myers and the Business of Architecture in the Gilded Age", Ronald D. Rarick, The Michigan Historical Review Vol. 26, No. 2, Fall 2000
- Elijah E. Myers: Politics, patronage, and professionalism, Paul Goeldner
- "The Designing Architect: Elijah E. Myers", Paul Goeldner, Southwestern Historical Quarterly 92 (October 1988)
- Radford v. Myers 231 U.S. 725 (1914)
