= Brinkerhoff Street Historic District =

Historic district in New York, United States

- U.S. National Register of Historic Places
- U.S. Historic district
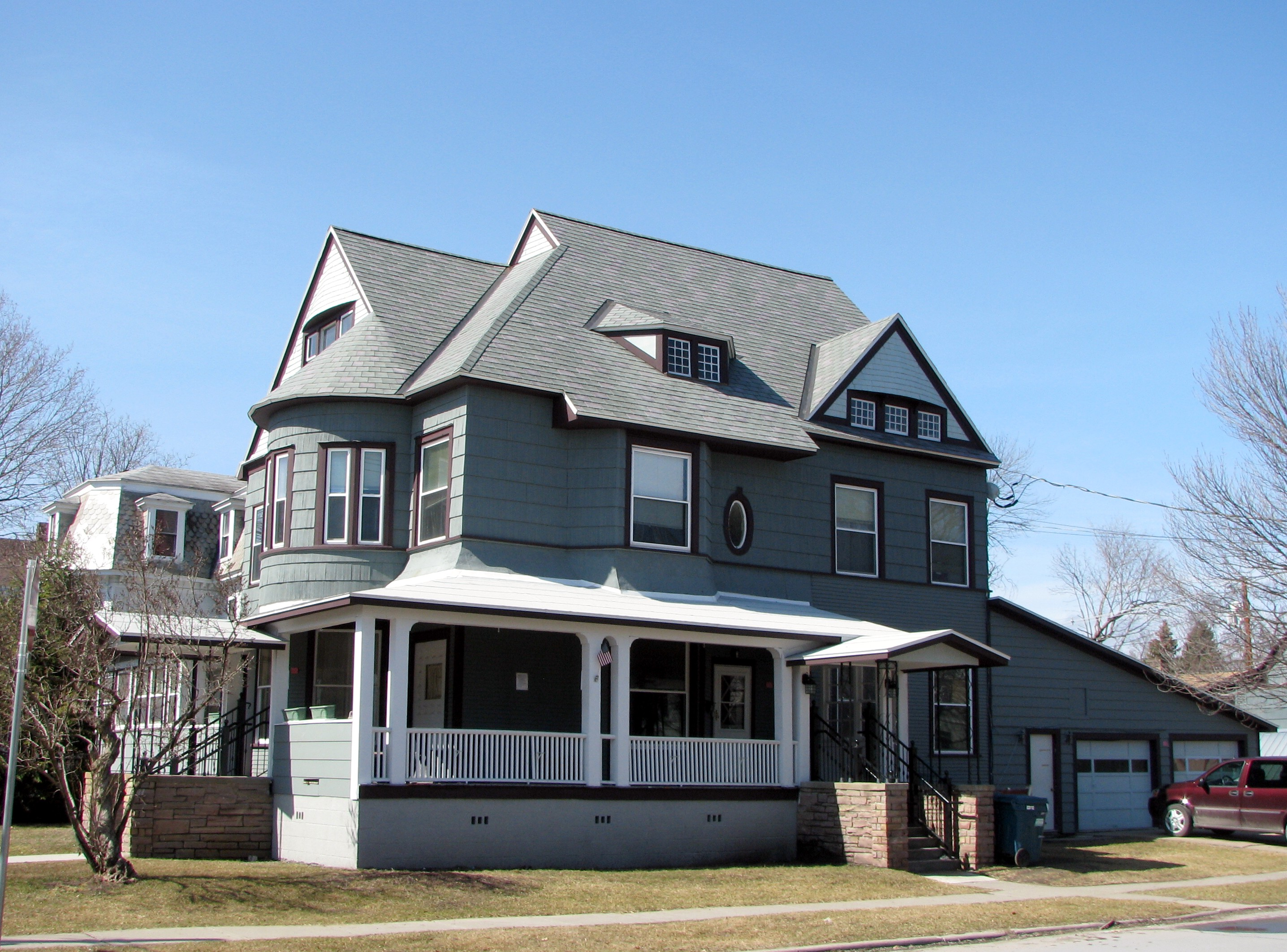
- A house in the Brinkerhoff Street Historic District

- Location within New York Location within the United States
- Location: Brinkerhoff St. between Oak and N. Catherine Sts., Plattsburgh, New York
- Coordinates: 44°41′49″N 73°27′25″W
- Area: 6 acres (2.4 ha)
- Built: 1845
- Architectural style: Mid 19th Century Revival, Late 19th And 20th Century Revivals, Late Victorian
- MPS: Plattsburgh City MRA
- NRHP reference No.: 82001099
- Added to NRHP: November 12, 1982

Brinkerhoff Street Historic District is a national historic district in Plattsburgh, New York. The residential district includes 13 contributing buildings. The district generally consists of one-and-one-half- to two-story brick or frame residences built between 1845 and 1890.

It was added to the National Register of Historic Places in 1982.
