= Henry M. Brinckerhoff =

American engineer (1868–1949)

Henry Morgan Brinckerhoff
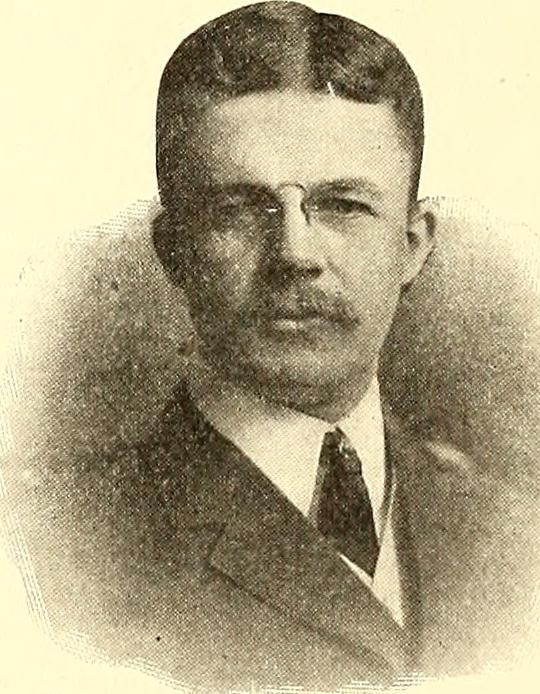
- Brinckerhoff in the Street Railway Journal (Feb. 17, 1906).
- Born: Henry Morgan Brinckerhoff; April 20, 1868; Beacon, New York
- Died: October 12, 1949 (aged 81); Englewood, New Jersey

Henry Morton Brinckerhoff (Note: Some branches of the family have shortened the surname spelling as "Brinkerhoff".) (20 April 1868 Beacon, New York – 12 October 1949 Englewood, New Jersey) was a pioneering highway engineer who in 1906 partnered with William Barclay Parsons to found what would eventually be known as Parsons Brinckerhoff, one of the largest transportation, planning and engineering companies in the United States.

== Engineering innovations ==
Brinckerhoff specialized in electric railways and he is best known for his co-invention of the third rail, (Note: The third-rail system was developed through multiple late-19th-century innovations; Brinckerhoff helped design early practical versions, while Granville T. Woods (1856–1910) patented later improvements.) which revolutionized rapid transit. He subsequently played a key role in the planning and development of transit systems of Chicago, Detroit, Cleveland and Cincinnati. Brinckerhoff also designed the network of roads at the 1939 New York World's Fair.

== Formal education ==
Brinckerhoff was educated at Trinity School in New York City and at the Stevens Institute of Technology in Hoboken, where he graduated in 1890 with a degree in mechanical engineering and was valedictorian of his class.

== Bibliography ==
=== References ===
- Bergen Evening Record. Hackensack, New Jersey. LCCN sn84-26624; OCLC 10518949 (all editions).
1. "Brinckerhoff, Inventor, Dead at Englewood – Engineer, Consultant for Chicago, Transport Expert Was 81" (obituary). Vol. 55, no. 110 (whole no. 16095). October 13, 1949. p. 2 (column 6, top).
  1. Via Newspapers.com.
- ENR – Engineering News-Record. New York: McGraw-Hill. LCCN 89-646589; ISSN 0891-9526; OCLC 15041368 (all editions).
1. "Henry M. Brinckerhoff (1868–1949)". Archived from the original on February 11, 2015.
- Pederson, Jay P. (ed.). International Directory of Company Histories. Detroit: St. James Press. LCCN 2001-208775; ISSN 1557-0126; ISBN 1-5586-2393-0; OCLC 43262799 (all editions).
1. Halasz, Robert (2000). Vol. 34: "Parsons Brinckerhoff, Inc.". pp. 333–336 – via Internet Archive (Kahle/Austin Foundation).
- Street Railway Journal (weekly). New York: McGraw Publishing Company. LCCN sn86-32979; ISSN 2771-6392; OCLC 8012554 (all editions).
1. "Personal Mention" – "Mr. H. M. Brinckerhoff". Vol. 27, no. 7. February 17, 1906. p. 298 – via Internet Archive (Smithsonian Libraries).
