= Brinkerhoff (given name) =

Brinkerhoff or Brinckerhoff is a given name derived from a surname. Notable people with the name include:

- Charles Brinckerhoff Richards (1833–1919), inventor, gunsmith, engineer (Colt's Patent Fire Arms Co., where he innovated the Colt Single Action Army revolver), Yale University professor
- J. B. Jackson or John Brinckerhoff "Brinck" Jackson (1909–1996), writer, publisher, instructor, and sketch artist in landscape design
- John Brinckerhoff Jackson (1862–1920), American lawyer and diplomat who spent most of his career in Europe and the Middle East
- Melbert Brinckerhoff Cary (1852–1946), Chairman of the Democratic Party of Connecticut from 1896 to 1900
- Melbert Brinckerhoff Cary, Jr. (1892–1941), graphic artist who imported numerous typefaces from Europe
- Remsen Brinckerhoff Ogilby (1881–1943), Episcopal priest and teacher, and the president of Trinity College in Hartford, Connecticut from 1920 to his death in 1943
- Robert Brinckerhoff Fairbairn (1818–1899), third president (aka "The Great Warden") of Bard College, Annandale-on-Hudson, New York, from 1863 to 1898
- Samuel Brinckerhoff "Brinck" Thorne (1873–1930), American college football player (Yale), coach, and 1970 inductee to the College Football Hall of Fame
