= William Brinkerhoff =

American politician

Member of the New Jersey Senate from Hudson County
- In office 1884–1887
- Preceded by: Elijah T. Paxton
- Succeeded by: William D. Edwards

Member of the New Jersey General Assembly from the 6th Hudson County district
- In office 1870–1871

Mayor of Bergen City, New Jersey
- In office 1868–1869
- Preceded by: John Hilton
- Succeeded by: Stephen D. Harrison

Personal details
- Born: July 19, 1843 Bergen City, New Jersey
- Died: January 26, 1931 (aged 87) Jersey City, New Jersey
- Party: Democratic
- Relations: James Fairman Fielder (nephew)

William Brinkerhoff (July 19, 1843 – December 7, 1919) was an American attorney and Democratic Party politician who represented Hudson County, New Jersey in the New Jersey General Assembly and the New Jersey Senate from 1884 to 1887.

His nephew, James Fairman Fielder, was governor of New Jersey from 1914 to 1917.

== Early life, military service, and education ==
William Brinkerhoff was born on July 19, 1843, in Bergen City, New Jersey (today part of Jersey City) to John and Hannah Brinkerhoff. The Brinkerhoff family were prominent local citizens throughout the history of the area, and his father was a director of the Hudson County Board of Chosen Freeholders and a judge of the Hudson County courts.

After attending local public schools, Brinkerhoff attended Rutgers College until the start of the American Civil War, when he dropped out to join the New Jersey volunteers in the VI Army Corps.

After returning from war, Brinkerhoff read law in the office of Jacob R. Wortendyke and was admitted to the bar as an attorney in 1865 and a counselor in 1869.

== Legal career ==
Following his admission to the bar, Brinkerhoff began practice in Jersey City. He served as counsel to the Hudson County Board of Chosen Freeholders from 1868 to 1872 and held three separate terms as corporation counsel for Jersey City beginning in 1884. At the time of his death, he was considered the oldest active member of the New Jersey bar.

In addition to his legal work, he was a director and charter member of the Commercial Trust Company of New Jersey and had offices in its building. He served as director of the First National Bank of Jersey City for several years.

In 1887, Brinkerhoff served as an advisor to the Tax Adjustment Commission of Jersey City.

== Political career ==
From the start of his legal career, Brinkerhoff was heavily involved in local and state politics. He was elected to the Bergen City Common Council as a young man. Upon the reincorporation of Bergen as a city, Brinkerhoff served on its first board of aldermen, representing the second ward alongside James Soper and John S. Sutphen. He was president of the board in 1868, when he became mayor ex officio upon the resignation of mayor John Hilton, serving the remainder of the term until Stephen D. Harrison was sworn into office in 1869. Brinkerhoff served during a period of exponential growth in the small city, with the population nearly doubling from 1868 to 1870.

During his career in municipal politics, Brinkerhoff was a leading advocate for the consolidation of Hudson County into a single municipality to create a uniform system of taxation, roads, and drainage systems. He and Robert Gilchrist Jr. submitted a bill to the county freeholders in 1868 which proposed to consolidate every municipality except Harrison and Kearny, which lay west of the Hackensack River. It was approved on April 2, setting up a special election for consolidation in each municipality in October of that year. Jersey City, Bergen City, and Hudson City overwhelmingly approved of consolidation; Union City and the town of Union also approved the measure but were not permitted to consolidate, as they were separated from the other three by towns which had rejected it.

In 1869, Brinkerhoff was elected as a member of the Democratic Party to represent the 6th Hudson County district in the New Jersey General Assembly, defeating Republican freeholder William E. Benjamin of Hudson City. He served a single term representing the district, which consisted of Bergen City, Hudson City, Bayonne and Greenville Township.

In 1873, he was chosen as a member of the state constitutional convention which framed several amendments to the Constitution of 1844. From 1880 to 1883, he was a member of the Democratic state executive committee. In 1884, he was elected to represent Hudson County in the New Jersey Senate, and he served until 1887.

== Personal life and death ==
Brinkerhoff married Melissa Clark in 1868 in Jersey City. She died in 1921. They had one daughter, Lillie Billings. Many years after his death, their home in Jersey City was cited as an eminent example of American brownstone architecture and was the subject of historic preservation efforts.

His nephew, James Fairman Fielder, was governor of New Jersey from 1914 to 1917.

He was a trustee of the Holland Society of New York and a member of the Carteret Club and the Jersey City Club. He was also a member of the Grand Army of the Republic.

Brinkerhoff died of pneumonia on January 26, 1931, at his home in Jersey City.
