= List of archaeological sites on the National Register of Historic Places in Illinois =

This is a list of archaeological sites on the National Register of Historic Places in Illinois.

Historic sites in the United States qualify to be listed on the National Register of Historic Places by passing one or more of four different criteria; Criterion D permits the inclusion of proven and potential archaeological sites. More than eighty different sites in Illinois are listed under this criterion, including both Native American and European sites. This list includes all properties in Illinois that qualify under this criterion.

== Current listings ==
| | Landmark name | Image | Location | County | Culture | Comments |
|---|---|---|---|---|---|---|
| 1 | Albany Mounds Site | | Albany: Albany Mounds Trail; 41°46′40″N 90°13′48″W | Whiteside | Middle Woodland: Hopewell | |
| 2 | Alton Military Prison Site | | Alton: inside the block bounded by Broadway and William, 4th, and Mill Sts. 38°53′30″N 90°11′26″W | Madison | Euro-American | |
| 3 | Apple River Fort Site | | Elizabeth: 0.25 miles east-southeast of the junction of Myrtle and Illinois Sts. 42°19′6″N 90°12′53″W | Jo Daviess | Euro-American | |
| 4 | Warren Bane Site | | Ellsworth: northeast of the junction of 3000E and 750N; 40°23′51″N 88°40′44″W | McLean | Kickapoo | |
| 5 | Beattie Park Mound Group | | Rockford: N. Main St. between Park and Mound Aves. 42°16′28″N 89°5′30″W | Winnebago | Late Woodland | |
| 6 | Bieker-Wilson Village Site | | New Haven: Sandy Slough, southeast of the junction of County Road 300N and 1650E; 37°55′2″N 88°4′34″W | White | Late Woodland and Mississippian | |
| 7 | Briscoe Mounds | | Channahon: Front St. along the Des Plaines River; 41°25′10″N 88°13′8″W | Will | Oneota | |
| 8 | Cahokia Mounds | | Collinsville: 7850 Collinsville Rd. at Cahokia Mounds State Park; 38°39′9″N 90°4′0″W | St. Clair | Mississippian | |
| 9 | Carrier Mills Archeological District | | Carrier Mills: along the Saline River south of Carrier Mills; 37°39′28″N 88°37′4″W | Saline | Late Archaic through Middle Woodland | |
| 10 | John Chapman Village Site | | Hanover: western side of Illinois Route 84, south of Hanover; 42°14′33″N 90°22′3″W | Jo Daviess | Late Woodland and Mississippian | |
| 11 | Civilian Conservation Corps Camp Shiloh Encampment Site | | Pleasant Grove Township: northwestern quarter of the northeastern quarter of the southwestern quarter of Section 21, Township 11 North, Range 9 East, of the Illinois Third Principal Meridian; 39°22′52″N 88°12′34″W | Coles | Euro-American | |
| 12 | Clear Lake Site | | Manito: junction of 1200E and 2600N in Sand Ridge State Park; 40°26′8″N 89°54′0″W | Mason and Tazewell | Late Woodland and Mississippian | |
| 13 | Cleiman Mound and Village Site | | Gorham: northeast of the junction of Big Lake and Thomas Town Rds. 37°46′50″N 89°31′51″W | Jackson | Middle Woodland through Mississippian | |
| 14 | Collins Archeological District | | Danville: west of Lake Mingo at Kennekuk County Park; 40°12′28″N 87°44′32″W | Vermilion | Late Woodland | |
| 15 | Corbin Farm Site | | Utica: Long Point, between Illinois Route 71 and the Illinois River; 41°18′37″N 88°56′21″W | LaSalle | Late Woodland and Upper Mississippian | |
| 16 | Dickson Mounds | | Lewistown: off County Road 4; 40°21′2″N 90°6′50″W | Fulton | Mississippian | |
| 17 | Dogtooth Bend Mounds and Village Site | | Willard: western end of Lake Milligan; 37°3′50″N 89°20′5″W | Alexander | Mississippian | |
| 18 | Duffy site | | New Haven: Sally Hardin Rd., southeast of New Haven; 37°51′31″N 88°5′47″W | Gallatin | Late Woodland | |
| 19 | Duncan Farm | | Grafton: southern side of Illinois Route 100, ½ mile west of Brussels Ferry; 38°58′5″N 90°30′49″W | Jersey | Paleoindian through Mississippian | |
| 20 | Emerald Mound and Village Site | | Lebanon: northwest of the junction of Emerald Mound Grange and Midgley Neiss Rd. 38°37′50″N 89°47′9″W | St. Clair | Mississippian | |
| 21 | Evelyn Site | | Newark: midway between Newark and Lisbon Center Rds., east of Big Grove Rd. 41°31′49″N 88°30′26″W | Kendall | Archaic | |
| 22 | Farm Creek Section | | East Peoria: southern side of Farm Creek; 40°40′40″N 89°29′25″W | Tazewell | Not applicable | |
| 23 | Fort Massac Site | | Metropolis: southeast of Metropolis on the Ohio River; 37°8′40″N 88°41′40″W | Massac | Euro-American | |
| 24 | French Colonial Historic District | | Prairie du Rocher: from Fort Chartres State Park to Kaskaskia Island; 38°5′20″N 90°10′0″W | Monroe and Randolph | Paleoindian through Mississippian and Euro-American | |
| 25 | Giant City Stone Fort Site | | Makanda: Stone Fort Rd. 37°37′24″N 89°11′49″W | Jackson | Late Woodland | |
| 26 | Golden Eagle-Toppmeyer Site | | Brussels: western side of Quarry Rd., south of Illinois River Rd. 38°54′55″N 90°31′13″W | Calhoun | Late Woodland | |
| 27 | Grand Tower Mining, Manufacturing and Transportation Company Site | | Grand Tower: Devil's Backbone Park; 37°38′12″N 89°30′33″W | Jackson | Euro-American | |
| 28 | Griggsville Landing Lime Kiln | | Valley City: Township Road 490, north of Napoleon Hollow; 39°41′23″N 90°38′45″W | Pike | Euro-American | |
| 29 | Horseshoe Lake Mound and Village Site | | Granite City: southwest of the junction of Illinois Route 111 and Horseshoe Lake Rd. 38°42′15″N 90°4′7″W | Madison | Late Woodland through Mississippian | |
| 30 | Hotel Plaza Site | | Utica: northeast of the lodge at Starved Rock State Park; 41°19′11″N 88°59′34″W | LaSalle | Archaic through Upper Mississippian | |
| 31 | Hubele Mounds and Village Site | | Maunie: east of the junction of County Roads 950N and 1900E; 38°1′0″N 88°1′56″W | White | Middle Woodland: Hopewell | |
| 32 | Kamp Mound Site | | Kampsville: Illinois Route 100, north of Kampsville; 39°19′56″N 90°37′15″W | Calhoun | Woodland | |
| 33 | Kellogg's Grove | | Kent: southeast of Kent; 42°17′44″N 89°52′52″W | Stephenson | Sauk and Euro-American | |
| 34 | Kincaid site | | Brookport: Newcut Rd. 37°4′50″N 88°29′31″W | Massac and Pope | Mississippian | |
| 35 | Kolmer Site | | Prairie du Rocher: Levee Rd., west of Fort Chartres State Park; 38°5′30″N 90°10′51″W | Randolph | Michigamea | |
| 36 | Koster Site | | Eldred: 200 yards (180 m) east of the Eldred-Hillview road, 5.5 miles (8.9 km) south of Eldred; 39°12′30″N 90°33′0″W | Greene | Archaic | |
| 37 | Kuhn Station Site | | Edwardsville: Rosewood Hills Dr. 38°47′11″N 89°51′38″W | Madison | Mississippian | |
| 38 | Larson Site | | Lewistown: Waterford Rd. north of the Waterford Cemetery; 40°20′36″N 90°7′52″W | Fulton | Late Woodland through Mississippian | |
| 39 | Lebanon Historic District | | Lebanon: irregular pattern centered along St. Louis and Belleville Sts. 38°36′3″N 89°49′21″W | St. Clair | Late Woodland through Mississippian | |
| 40 | Little Beaver Site | | Utica: Starved Rock State Park, west of Illinois Route 178; 41°19′10″N 89°1′16″W | LaSalle | Middle Woodland | |
| 41 | Lunsford-Pulcher Archeological Site | | Columbia: western side of Oklahoma Hill Rd. 38°29′40″N 90°13′52″W | Monroe and St. Clair | Mississippian | |
| 42 | Marseilles Hydro Plant | | Marseilles: Commercial St. 41°19′35″N 88°42′52″W | LaSalle | Euro-American | |
| 43 | Pierre Martin House | | North Dupo: 1st St. at Old Illinois Route 3; 38°32′50″N 90°11′56″W | St. Clair | Euro-American | |
| 44 | Mayberry Mound and Village Site | | Sims: northeast of the junction of County Road 900E and the Skillet Fork; 38°19′15″N 88°31′30″W | Wayne | Archaic | |
| 45 | McCune Mound and Village Site | | Sterling: western side of Illinois Route 40, north of Science Ridge Rd. 41°50′0″N 89°42′24″W | Whiteside | Upper Mississippian | |
| 46 | Millstone Bluff | | Glendale: Illinois Route 147 west of its junction with Illinois Route 145; 37°28′1″N 88°41′17″W | Pope | Late Woodland through Mississippian | |
| 47 | Millville Town Site | | Apple River: Apple River Canyon State Park, 8663 E. Canyon Rd. 42°26′48″N 90°3′9″W | Jo Daviess | Euro-American | |
| 48 | Mitchell Archeological Site | | Mitchell: western end of University Dr. 38°45′32″N 90°5′10″W | Madison | Mississippian | |
| 49 | Modoc Rock Shelter | | Modoc: northeastern side of County Road 7 southeast of Roscow Hollow Rd. 38°3′46″N 90°3′50″W | Randolph | Early Archaic through Mississippian | |
| 50 | Morris Wide Water Canal Boat Site | | Morris: E. Washington St. 41°21′58″N 88°24′13″W | Grundy | Euro-American | |
| 51 | Mound House Site | | Hillview: Eastern bank of the Illinois River, ½ mile west of the end of 600E; 39°29′36″N 90°35′1″W | Greene | Early Woodland through Mississippian | |
| 52 | Naples Archeological District | | Naples: eastern bank of the Illinois River south of Naples; 39°44′18″N 90°37′6″W | Scott | Early Woodland through Mississippian | |
| 53 | Naples Mound 8 | | Griggsville: north of Interstate 72 just west of the Illinois River; 39°41′15″N 90°39′8″W | Pike | Middle Woodland: Hopewell | |
| 54 | New Philadelphia Town Site | | Barry: Township Road 156, east of Barry; 39°41′45″N 90°57′35″W | Pike | Euro-American | |
| 55 | Nutwood Site | | Nutwood: western side of Illinois Route 100, 500 feet south of the Narrows Creek bridge 39°4′54″N 90°33′23″W | Jersey | Late Woodland | |
| 56 | Ogden-Fettie Site | | Lewistown: south of Lewistown; 40°20′29″N 90°7′3″W | Fulton | Middle Woodland: Hopewell | |
| 57 | Old Kaskaskia Village | | Ottawa: Dee Bennett Rd. on the northern side of the Illinois River; 41°19′19″N 88°57′36″W | LaSalle | Kaskaskia | |
| 58 | Orendorf Site | | Canton: western side of U.S. Route 24 near the northern end of the Duck Creek Cooling Pond; 40°29′15″N 89°57′6″W | Fulton | Mississippian | |
| 59 | Orr-Herl Mound and Village Site | | Rosiclare: northern bank of the Ohio River midway between Elizabethtown and Rosiclare; 37°26′4″N 88°19′39″W | Hardin | Mississippian | |
| 60 | Piney Creek Site | | Campbell Hill: north of Piney Creek in Piney Creek Ravine Nature Preserve; 37°53′49″N 89°38′10″W | Randolph | Late Woodland through Mississippian | |
| 61 | Piney Creek South Site | | Campbell Hill: south of Piney Creek in Piney Creek Ravine Nature Preserve; 37°53′47″N 89°38′9″W | Randolph | Late Woodland | |
| 62 | Piney Creek West Site | | Campbell Hill: north of Piney Creek in Piney Creek Ravine Nature Preserve; 37°53′49″N 89°38′14″W | Randolph | Late Woodland | |
| 63 | Riverton Site | | Palestine: northern side of 1150th Avenue immediately west of the Wabash River, northeast of Palestine; 39°1′18″N 87°34′32″W | Crawford | Late Archaic: Riverton | |
| 64 | Rock Island Arsenal | | Rock Island: Rock Island in the Mississippi River; 41°31′0″N 90°33′0″W | Rock Island | Euro-American | |
| 65 | Rockwell Mound | | Havana: Rockwell Park at the northern end of Orange St. 40°18′18″N 90°3′49″W | Mason | Middle Woodland: Havana Hopewell | |
| 66 | John Roy Site | | Clayton: southwest of the junction of 1700th Ave. and 2950th St. 39°59′56″N 90°56′59″W | Adams | Late Woodland | |
| 67 | Saline Springs | | Equality: Salt Well Rd., ½ mile west of the Saline River bridge 37°42′18″N 88°17′43″W | Gallatin | Early Woodland through Mississippian and Euro-American | |
| 68 | Schudel No. 2 Site | | Hamburg: 200N, west of Mississippi River Rd. 39°9′49″N 90°41′36″W | Calhoun | Early Woodland through Mississippian | |
| 69 | Shaky Shelter Site | | Utica: in a ravine south of Illinois Route 71 at Starved Rock State Park; 41°18′22″N 88°56′41″W | LaSalle | Upper Mississippian | |
| 70 | Sheets Site | | Lewistown: County Road 14, west of Lewistown; 40°24′1″N 90°12′40″W | Fulton | Late Archaic through Early Woodland | |
| 71 | Sinnissippi site | | Sterling: Sinnissippi Park, off 13th St. 41°47′49″N 89°39′50″W | Whiteside | Middle Woodland: Hopewell | |
| 72 | Sleeth Site | | Liverpool: northeast of the junction of U.S. Route 24 and Pollitt Rd. 40°25′27″N 90°0′0″W | Fulton | Mississippian | |
| 73 | Starved Rock | | Ottawa: 6 miles from Ottawa on Illinois Route 71, Starved Rock State Park; 41°19′8″N 88°59′36″W | LaSalle | Kaskaskia and Euro-American | |
| 74 | Stoner Site | | Robinson: eastern side of 1550th St. between 1300th and 1235th Aves. 39°2′18″N 87°39′20″W | Crawford | Allison-Lamotte | |
| 75 | Swan Island Site | | Palestine: northern side of the junction of the Wabash River and the Crawford/Lawrence county line 38°51′12″N 87°32′18″W | Crawford | Late Archaic: Riverton | |
| 76 | Tampico Mounds | | Maples Mill: west of the junction of U.S. Route 24 and County Road 8; 40°24′58″N 90°0′56″W | Fulton | Late Woodland | |
| 77 | Tegtmeyer Site | | Campbell Hill: north of Piney Creek in Piney Creek Ravine Nature Preserve; 37°53′51″N 89°38′16″W | Randolph | Mississippian | |
| 78 | Ware Mounds and Village Site | | Ware: west of the junction of Illinois Routes 3 and 146 at Ware; 37°26′47″N 89°24′0″W | Union | Late Woodland through Mississippian | |
| 79 | White and Company's Goose Lake Stoneware Manufactury | | Morris: 5010 N. Jugtown Rd. 41°20′50″N 88°19′19″W | Grundy | Euro-American | |
| 80 | White and Company's Goose Lake Tile Works | | Morris: 5010 N. Jugtown Rd. 41°20′46″N 88°18′59″W | Grundy | Euro-American | |
| 81 | Wilson Mounds and Village Site | | Maunie: within and surrounding the Marshall Ferry Cemetery at Rising Sun; 37°59′57″N 88°1′55″W | White | Middle Woodland: Havana Hopewell | |
| 82 | Windrose Site | | Bourbonnais: Kankakee River Nature Preserve, west of Bradley; 41°10′20″N 87°57′3″W | Kankakee | Pottawatomie | |

== See also ==
- National Register of Historic Places listings in Illinois
