= National Register of Historic Places listings in Calhoun County, Illinois =

Location of Calhoun County in Illinois

This is a list of the National Register of Historic Places listings in Calhoun County, Illinois.

This is intended to be a complete list of the properties and districts on the National Register of Historic Places in Calhoun County, Illinois, United States. Latitude and longitude coordinates are provided for many National Register properties and districts; these locations may be seen together in a map.

There are 7 properties and districts listed on the National Register in the county, including one former National Historic Landmark.

This National Park Service list is complete through NPS recent listings posted December 12, 2025.

== Current listings ==
	Name on the Register	Image	Date listed	Location	City or town	Description
1	Brussels Historic District	Brussels Historic District	August 6, 1998 (#98000981)	Roughly along Main and Community Sts. 38°56′59″N 90°35′13″W	Brussels	
2	Golden Eagle-Toppmeyer Site	Golden Eagle-Toppmeyer Site	June 14, 1979 (#79000816)	Western side of Quarry Rd., south of Illinois River Rd. 38°54′55″N 90°31′13″W	Brussels	
3	Goldenrod	Goldenrod	December 24, 1967 (#67000029)	Kampsville riverfront 39°20′27″N 90°37′10″W	Kampsville	Burned in 2017 and remains subsequently scrapped; NHL designation withdrawn in 2023.
4	Kamp Mound Site	Kamp Mound Site	August 24, 1978 (#78001114)	Illinois Route 100, north of Kampsville; 39°19′56″N 90°37′15″W	Kampsville	
5	Kamp Store	Kamp Store	February 4, 1994 (#94000027)	Northeastern corner of the junction of Oak and Broadway; 39°17′54″N 90°36′37″W	Kampsville	
6	Michael Klunk Farmstead	Michael Klunk Farmstead	June 23, 1982 (#82002518)	Crater Creek Rd., south of Kampsville; 39°15′23″N 90°38′14″W	Michael	
7	Schudel No. 2 Site	Schudel No. 2 Site	June 15, 1979 (#79000817)	200N, west of Mississippi River Rd. 39°09′49″N 90°41′36″W	Hamburg	

== See also ==
- List of National Historic Landmarks in Illinois
- National Register of Historic Places listings in Illinois
