= Windross =

Windross is a surname. Notable people with the surname include:

- Dennis Windross (1938–1989), British footballer
- Rose Windross, British singer-songwriter

== See also ==
- Windrose (disambiguation)
