= Mayberry Mound and Village Site =

Archaeological site in Illinois, United States

- U.S. National Register of Historic Places
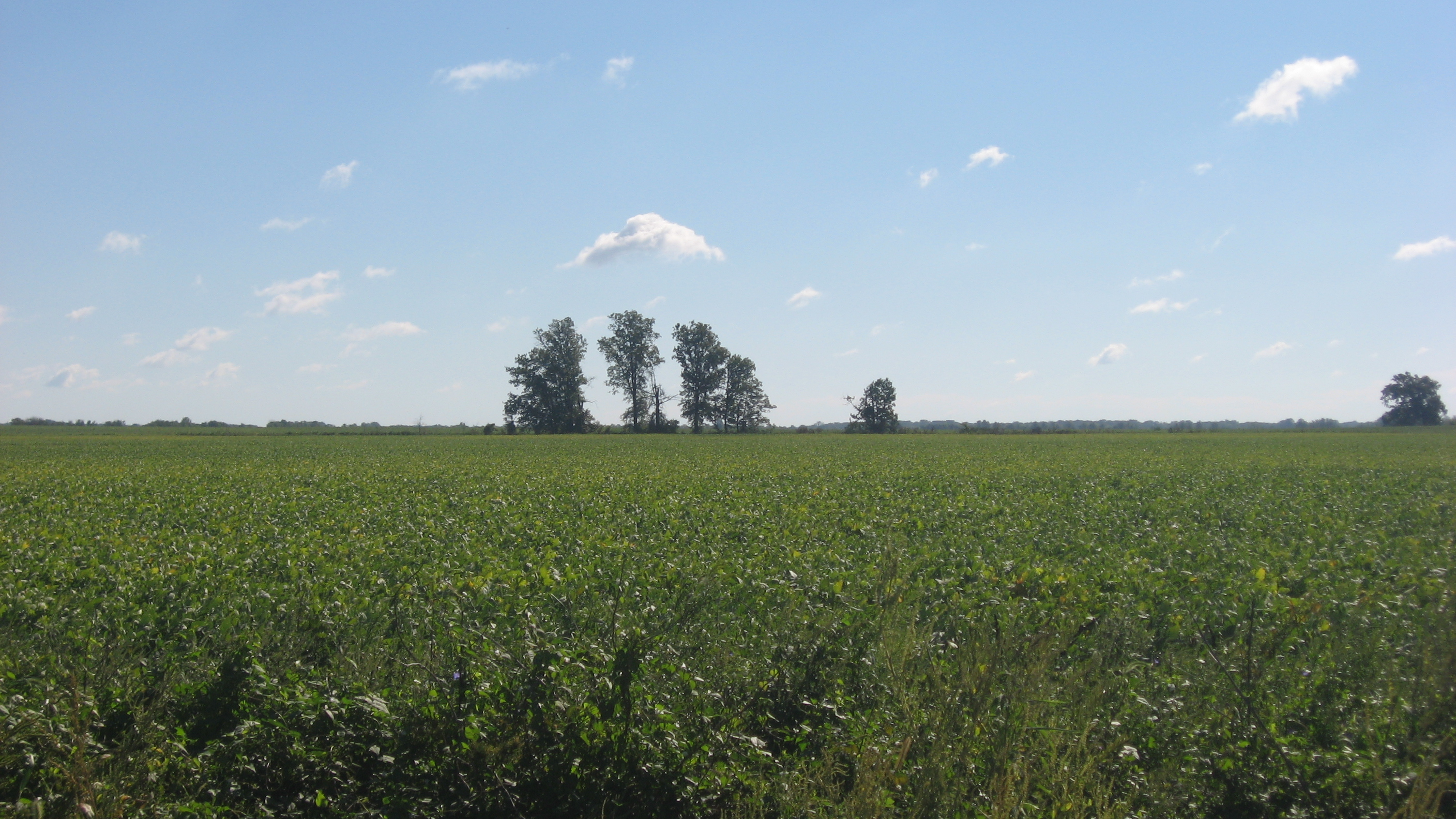
- Comprehensive view from the west

- Location within Illinois Location within the United States
- Location: Northeast of the junction of County Road 900E and the Skillet Fork
- Nearest city: Sims, Illinois
- Coordinates: 38°19′15″N 88°31′30″W
- Area: 90 acres (36 ha)
- NRHP reference No.: 78001195
- Added to NRHP: November 21, 1978

The Mayberry Mound and Village Site are a valuable archaeological site in the southeastern portion of the U.S. state of Illinois. Located near the village of Sims in southern Wayne County, the site comprises what was once a substantial village during the Archaic period, and it has been designated a historic site because of its archaeological importance.

== Surroundings ==
Mayberry occupies part of the southern side of a low ridgeline known as the Fleming Ridge, a short distance north of a stream known as the Skillet Fork. It lies about 2,000 feet (610 m) away from the nearest public right-of-way, a small unpaved north-south road to the west. The site centers around a small hill, the "mound" that contributes to its name; it measures approximately 80 by 60 metres (260 ft × 200 ft) north-south by east-west and is approximately 2 metres (6 ft 7 in) high. Despite the presence of recently dug holes in the middle, the overall structure of the hill has been well preserved. Surrounding the "mound" is a region of soil that appears substantially darker than other parts of the same farm field when seen from the air.

== Investigations ==
In 1974, archaeologists from Southern Illinois University Museum conducted a field survey at the Mayberry Site. Their survey recovered substantial numbers of artifacts from the "mound" and the surrounding area of darkened soil, including projectile points, bits of bones and shells, and quantities of charcoal. As a result of these findings, the site has been classified as a village from the Archaic period: the "mound" appears to be a simple midden approximately 1.5 metres (4 ft 11 in) deep, and the surrounding soil seems to have been darkened by the presence of buried cultural materials left behind by the villagers. After the field survey was concluded, local residents reported the discovery of twelve skeletons that had been buried in the southeastern portion of the "mound" in such a way that they overlapped each other.

== Conclusions ==
Post-survey analysis of the 1974 survey produced excitement among the analyzing archaeologists. Most important was the presence of an apparent village: they concluded that the area surrounding the mound could perhaps produce rich information about Archaic period villages if excavation prove it to be a village site. Moreover, the very size of the site made it significant: few Archaic sites in Illinois encompass an area as large as Mayberry, which covers approximately 90 acres (36 ha), or more than 1/8 of a square mile. Thirdly, the survey showed that typical artifacts from the site had been preserved excellently, and the skeletons from the "mound" were in an equally good condition. Some damage has been done to the site — the recently dug holes in the middle of the "mound" were the work of pothunters, and the skeletons would not have been found if the surface had not been worn down. Nevertheless, the site as a whole remains mostly intact, and its value is compounded by the close proximity of burials, a deep midden, and a potential village site. As a result of its archaeological value, the site was listed on the National Register of Historic Places in late 1978. It is the only Wayne County location on the Register, aside from houses in the city of Fairfield to the northeast.

== See also ==
- List of archaeological sites on the National Register of Historic Places in Illinois
