= Nutwood =

Nutwood may refer to:

== Places ==
=== Australia ===
- Nutwood Downs, Northern Territory

=== United States ===
- Nutwood (La Grange, Georgia), listed on the National Register of Historic Places (NRHP)
- Nutwood Site, Nutwood, Illinois, listed on the NRHP in Jersey County, Illinois
- Nutwood, Illinois, an unincorporated community
- Nutwood Place, Urbana, Ohio, NRHP-listed

== Other ==
- Nutwood is a fictional locale in the Rupert Bear children's book series
- Nutwood is a common name for Terminalia arostrata and Terminalia grandiflora
