= John Roy Site =

Archaeological site in Illinois, United States

- U.S. National Register of Historic Places
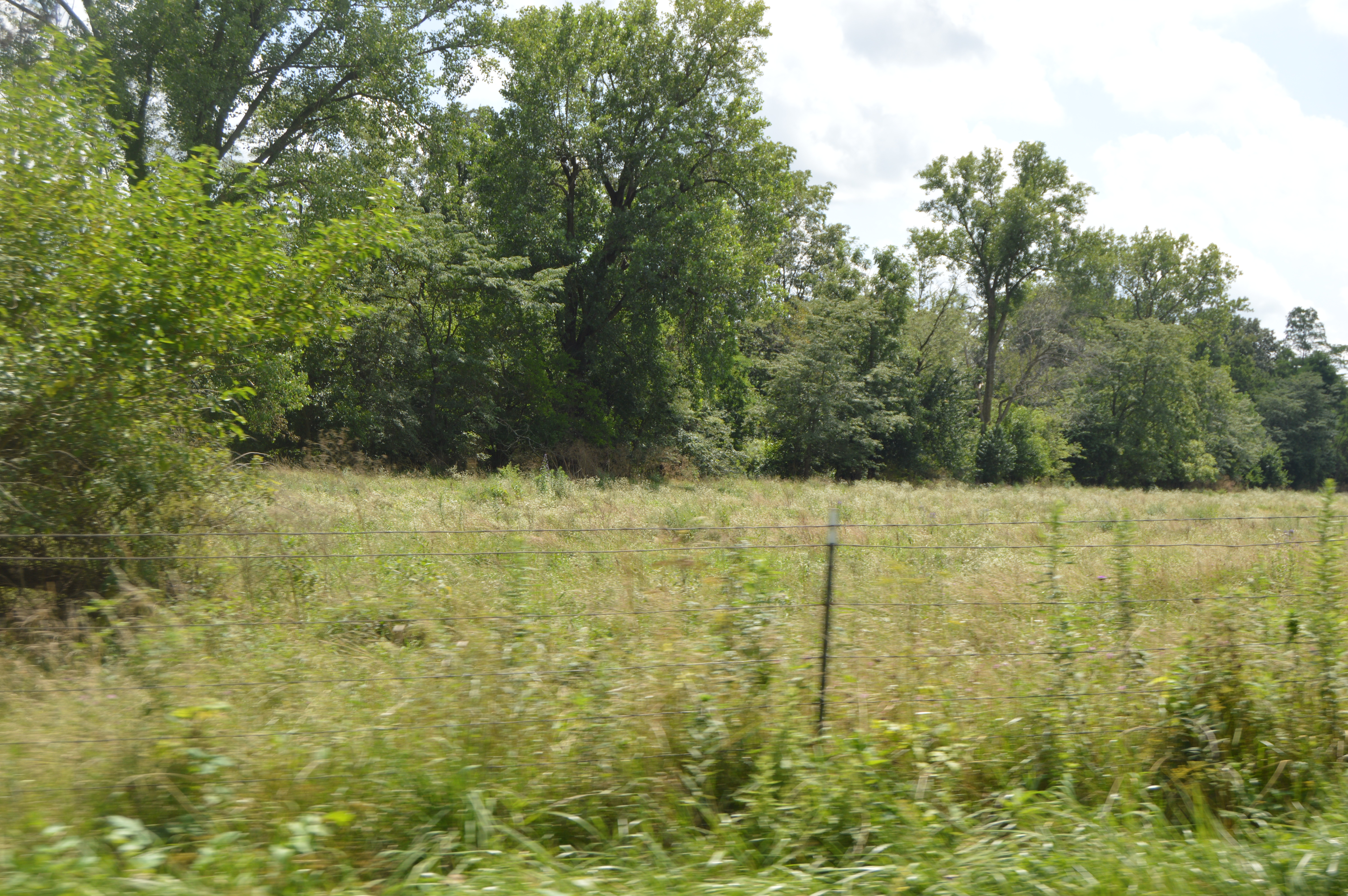
- Fields at the site

- Location within Illinois
- Location: Southwest of the junction of 1700th Ave. and 2950th St.
- Nearest city: Clayton, Illinois
- Coordinates: 40°1′45″N 90°57′29″W
- Area: 3 acres (1.2 ha)
- NRHP reference No.: 78001109
- Added to NRHP: May 22, 1978

The John Roy Site is a pre-Columbian archaeological site located roughly 2 miles (3.2 km) south of Clayton in Adams County, Illinois. The site consists of a Woodland period village site inhabited from roughly 450 to 650 A.D.; five burial mounds are also associated with the site. The site's upland location is uncommon for village sites from the period, which have mostly been located in river valleys. The location may have been affected by the development of plant cultivation at the time, and extensive seed deposits at the site provide insight into developing agricultural practices. In addition, preserved remnants of woven artifacts have been found at the site; such items are rare and may help explain how weaving developed during the period.

The site was added to the National Register of Historic Places on May 22, 1978.

== See also ==
- List of archaeological sites on the National Register of Historic Places in Illinois
