= Grand Village of the Kickapoo =

Archaeological site in Illinois, United States

- Warren Bane Site
- U.S. National Register of Historic Places
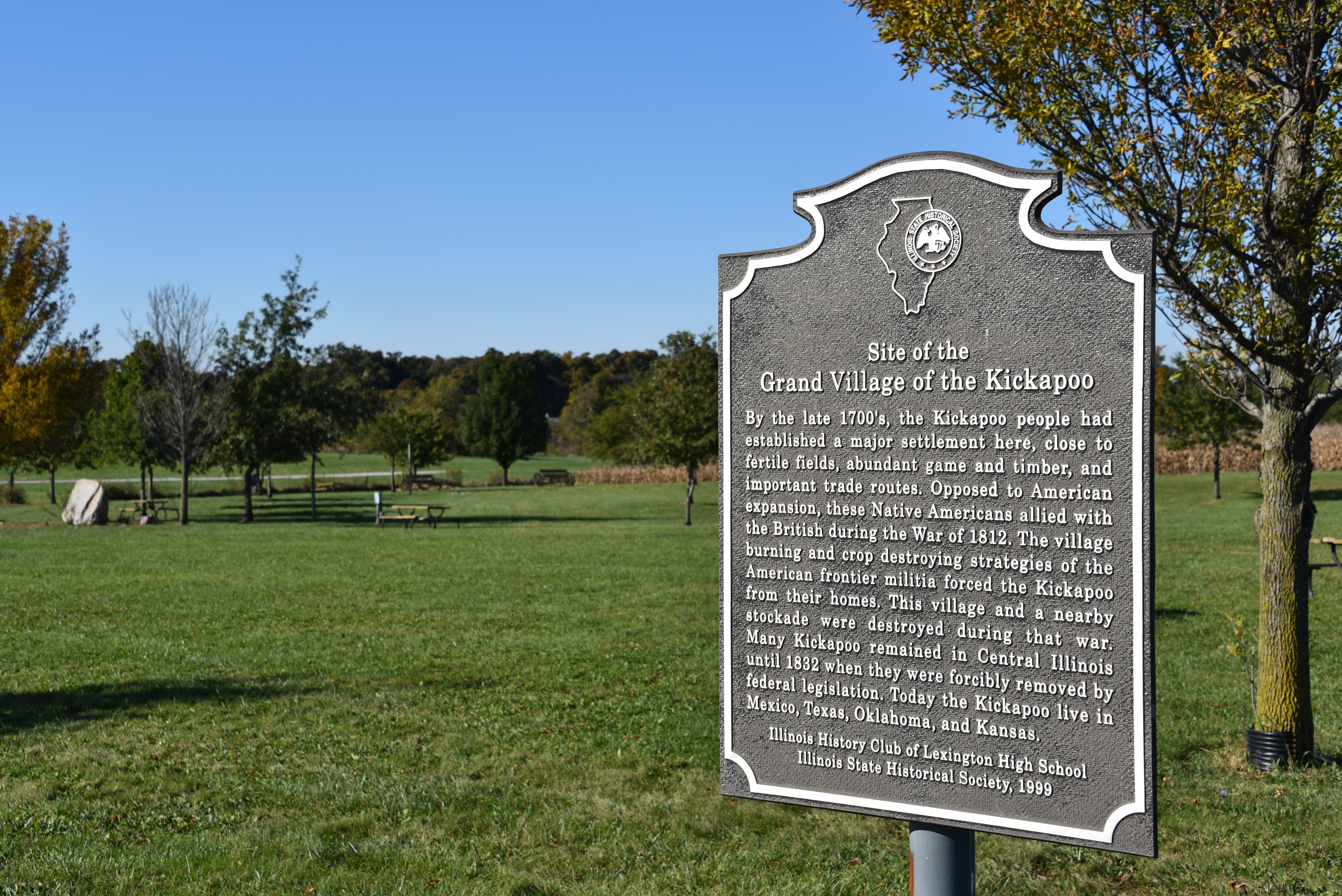

- Location within Illinois Location within the United States
- Location: Ellsworth, McLean County, Illinois
- Coordinates: 40°26′58″N 88°43′0″W
- Area: 70.7 acres (28.6 ha)
- NRHP reference No.: 82002588
- Added to NRHP: March 19, 1982

The Grand Village of the Kickapoo is a Kickapoo village site in rural McLean County, Illinois, United States. The village site includes the Warren Bane Site, a defensive fort which was built circa 1750 to protect the village. The village was occupied until 1813, when a U.S Army officer under the command of Zachary Taylor burned the village.

The Warren Bane Site has been listed on the National Register of Historic Places since 1982. It is one of the sites that has its address restricted by the National Register due to fear of vandalism and looting.

== See also ==
- List of archaeological sites on the National Register of Historic Places in Illinois
