= Vivian Hickey =

American educator and politician

Vivian Ellen (née Veach) Hickey (March 25, 1916 – April 28, 2016) was an American educator and politician.

Born in Clayton, Illinois, Hickey received her bachelor's degree from Rockford University, in 1937 and her master's degree from the University of North Carolina, in 1938. Hickey also studied at Bradley Polytechnic Institute and University of Wisconsin. She taught at Keith Country Day School, Winnebago High School, and Rockford University. She lived in Rockford, Illinois. Hickey was elected to the Rock Valley College Board and was involved with the Democratic Party. In 1974, Hickey was appointed to the Illinois Senate after Senator Betty Ann Keegan died while in office. Hickey served until 1979. In 2011, Hickey moved to Mill Valley, California to be closer to her family. She died at the Redwoods Retirement Community in Mill Valley, California.
