= Albany Mounds State Historic Site =

- Albany Mounds Site
- U.S. National Register of Historic Places
- Illinois State Historic Site
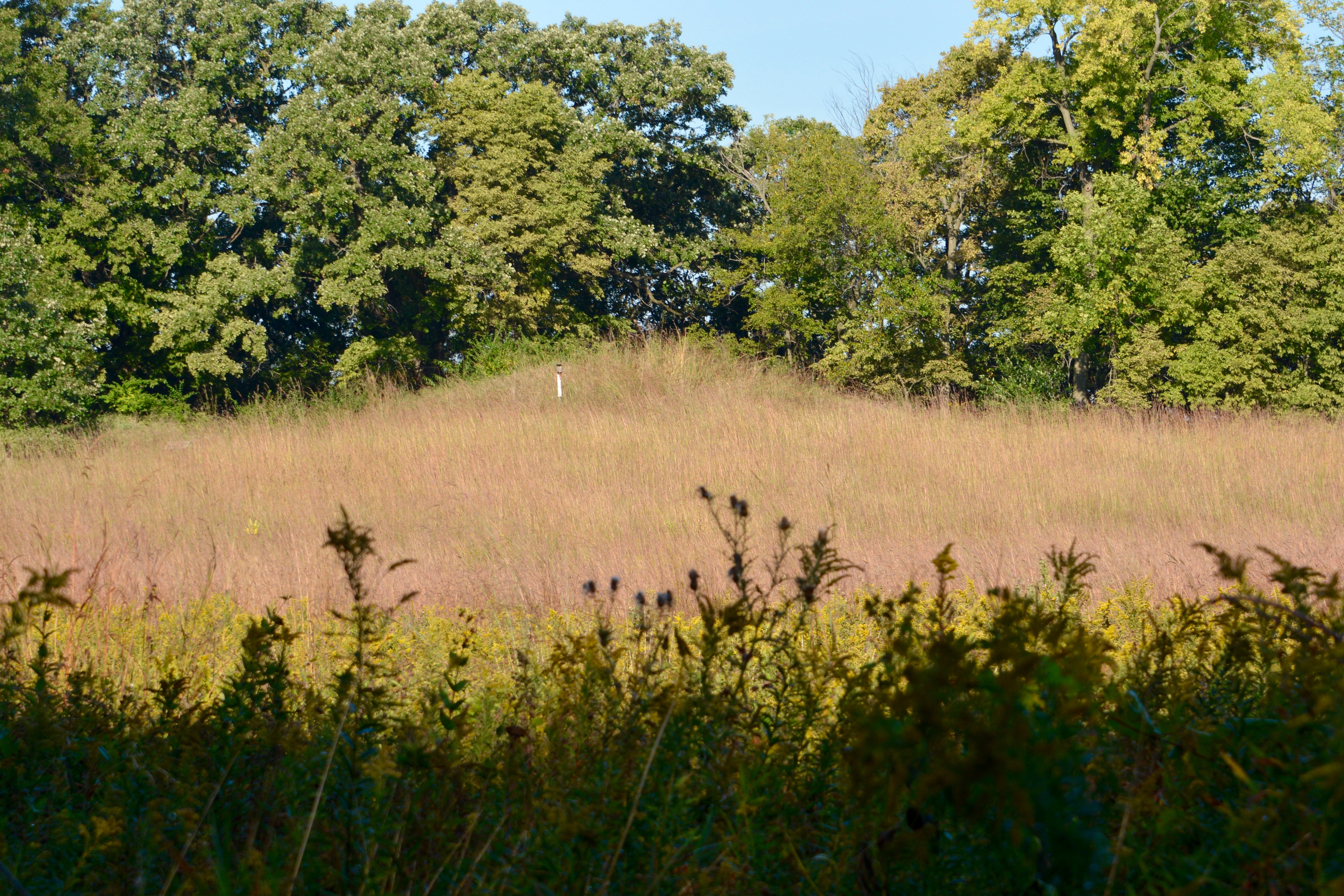

- Location within Illinois Location within the United States
- Nearest city: Albany, Illinois
- NRHP reference No.: 74000775
- Added to NRHP: October 9, 1974

Albany Mounds State Historic Site, also known as Albany Mounds Site, is a historic site operated by the Illinois Historic Preservation Agency. It spans over 205 acres of land near the Mississippi River at the northwest edge of the state of Illinois in the United States. In 1974, the site was added to the National Register of Historic Places list. The historical site is under the provision of the Illinois Historic Preservation Agency, a governmental agency founded in 1985 for the maintaining of historical sites within the state. In the 1990s, the site underwent a restoration project that aimed to return its appearance to its original condition.

== Background ==
Considered to be one of the most important archaeological sites in the state of Illinois, the site aims to exist as "an interpretive center for the history of the Hopewellian culture of more than 2000 years ago." It is the largest Hopewell Native American site in the state, and contains evidence of human activity that stretches over 10,000 years in length from the present day.

Historically comprising ninety-six mounds, the site today consists of a remaining forty-seven mounds, eight of which are in poor condition as a result of natural and human processes. The mounds are up to twelve feet high, and were constructed as burial sites for the dead. Features of the historical site in addition to many of the original two-thousand-year-old mounds, include several recreation trails, a parking lot, picnic area, and restrooms. Visitors can easily witness the wildlife, such as deer and eagles, that inhabit the area. Over two miles of trail encompass the site, featuring interpretive signs signifying the local flora.

== Archaeological significance ==
The archaeological area is older than the more famous Cahokia site in the southern part of the state. The Mounds date back to the Middle Woodland Period, commonly referred to as the Hopewell period. This period characterized critical changes in the lifestyles of native peoples in the New World. The Middle Woodland period is considered to have persisted between 200 BCE and 300 CE. It was during this period that farming techniques began to be implanted, alongside older hunting activities. This was a period in which technological and agricultural innovation was burgeoning, leading up to the more complex social structuring of the Mississippian cultures several centuries later. The Albany mounds site was founded by an Indigenous peoples that inhabited the area over 2000 years ago. Little can be said for certain about the Hopewell people, which is a term that does not refer to a tribe but rather is an umbrella term for a people that inhabited this period of anthropological activity. Burial artifacts found at the site show materials not native to the area which "indicate the existence of trading networks with Native Americans from other areas."

The Hopewell people of Illinois constructed large mounds in the land for death and burial ceremonies. These erected structures of raised earth were used as final burying places, and were constructed uniformly, using similar techniques but ranging in size. The historic site's significance lies in the amount of information one can gather about the peoples that inhabited the area millennia ago. Nineteenth and twentieth century excavations of the mounds revealed interesting burial practices on the part of the Hopewell peoples. Stone and wood crypts contained artifacts such as intricate bead jewelry, pottery and mica plates. These native peoples preferred to build their villages near rivers, accounting for the site's location on the eastern side of the Mississippi River. The drainage that when the river would flood provided the Hopewell with resources that allowed the settlements to prosper for centuries. The large concentrations of pipe stone and platform pipe artifacts in the area suggests that the site was an important "pipe manufacturing center." Evidence of waning culture corresponded to around 350 CE, and the mounds were left deserted until excavations and preservation efforts began in the nineteenth century.

== See also ==
- List of archaeological sites on the National Register of Historic Places in Illinois
