= Kuhn Station Site =

Archaeological site in Illinois, United States

- U.S. National Register of Historic Places
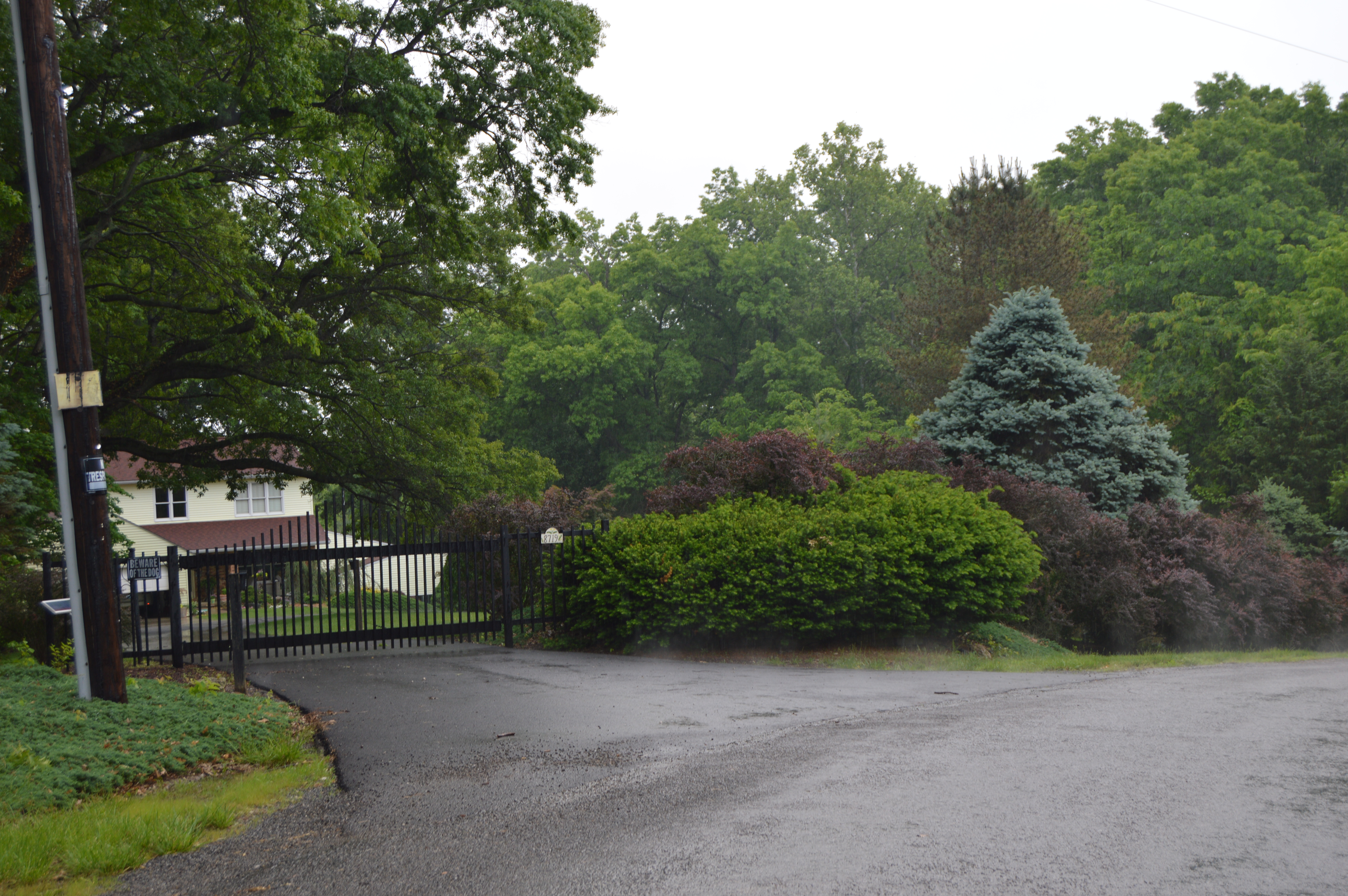
- Part of the property
- Location: Madison County, Illinois, USA
- Nearest city: Edwardsville, Illinois
- NRHP reference No.: 80001393
- Added to NRHP: November 25, 1980

The Kuhn Station Site is the site of an archaeological dig on Silver Creek, near Edwardsville, Illinois. The site is roughly .3 hectares in area, and was home to a small village. The site is believed to be from the Mississippian period, but archaeologists also found artifacts dating from the Moorehead/Sand Prairie period, such as ceramics. As well, the village had an earthen embankment surrounding its perimeter, and a low platform mound.

== See also ==
- List of archaeological sites on the National Register of Historic Places in Illinois

== Sources ==
- Emerson, Thomas E., Lewis, R. Barry (1999). Cahokia and the Hinterlands, University of Illinois Press.
