= Giant City Stone Fort Site =

Archaeological site in Illinois, United States

- U.S. National Register of Historic Places
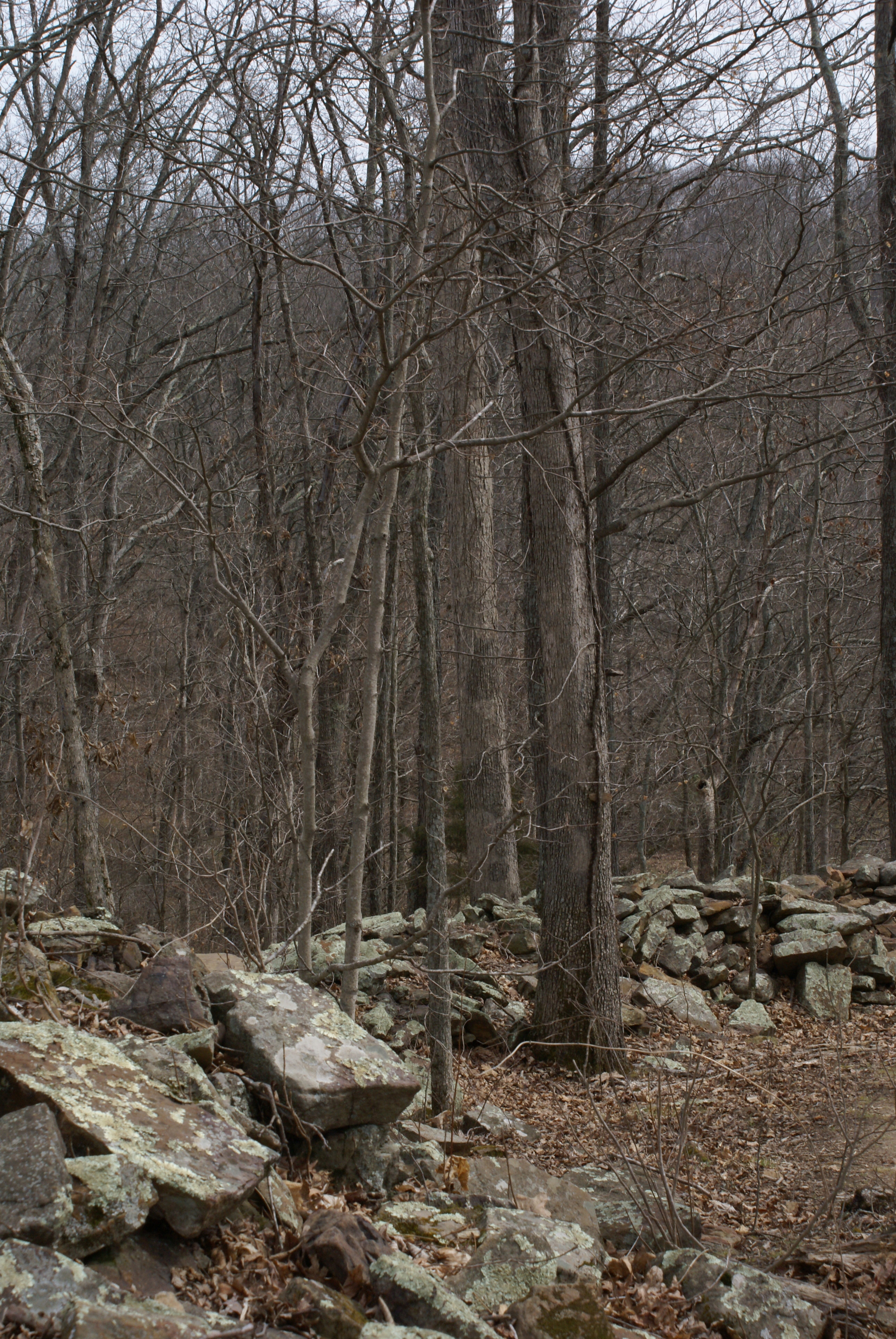

- Location within Illinois Location within the United States
- Nearest city: Makanda, Illinois
- Coordinates: 37°37′24″N 89°11′49″W
- Area: 1.4 acres (0.57 ha)
- NRHP reference No.: 02000848
- Added to NRHP: August 9, 2002

The Giant City Stone Fort Site is the site of a prehistoric stone enclosure located within Giant City State Park in Jackson County, Illinois, United States. The Stone Fort dates to the Late Woodland period and was constructed and used in the period from c. AD 600–900; it is one of ten such sites known in Southern Illinois. All ten were constructed atop either promontories or hilltops; the Giant City site is in the former group, as it sits atop a sloped ridge. The purpose of these enclosures is unclear; while archaeologists originally theorized that they were military fortifications, the present archaeological consensus suggests that the sites were used as meeting places or ceremonial locations of some nature.

The original stone wall of the fort was dismantled by European settlers in the region, who used the stone as a building material; the stone base is all that remains of the original wall. In 1934, the Civilian Conservation Corps reconstructed the wall while improving the state park. The first professional archaeological investigations of the site were conducted in 1956 by archaeologists from Southern Illinois University, while the first in-depth survey of the site took place in 2000–2001. The site is accessible to park visitors via a nature trail.

The site was added to the National Register of Historic Places on August 9, 2002.

== See also ==
- List of archaeological sites on the National Register of Historic Places in Illinois
