= Mary K. Meany =

Politician

Member of the Illinois House of Representatives

Personal details
- Born: October 6, 1897
- Died: October 12, 2000 (aged 103)
- Party: Republican

Mary K. Meany (October 6, 1897 – October 12, 2000) was an American politician and educator.

Born in Clayton, Illinois, Meany graduated from Northwestern University in 1919 and then married Robert E. Meany who was a vice-president for William Wrigley Jr. Company. She taught English and music in the New York City, New York and Sheldon, Illinois public schools. Meany lived in Chicago, Illinois and was involved with the Women's Civic Club of Chicago and the Republican Party. Meany served in the Illinois House of Representatives from 1965 to 1969. She died from pneumonia at the Washington and Jane Smith Home in Chicago, Illinois.
