= Windrose =

Windrose or wind rose can refer to:

- Wind rose, a meteorologist's graphic tool
- Compass rose, a compass subdivision
- Compass rose network or rhumbline network, a network composed of a group of compass roses emerging from hexadecagon vertices
- Maupin Windrose, an American glider design
- Windrose 5.5, an American sailboat design
- Wind Rose Aviation, a Ukrainian airline
- Wind Rose (band), an Italian power metal band
- Windrose Site, archaeological site in Illinois, United States
- Windrose (video game), a survival video game published by Pocketpair
