= Marseilles Hydro Plant =

Historic hydroelectric power station in Marseilles, Illinois, USA

- U.S. National Register of Historic Places
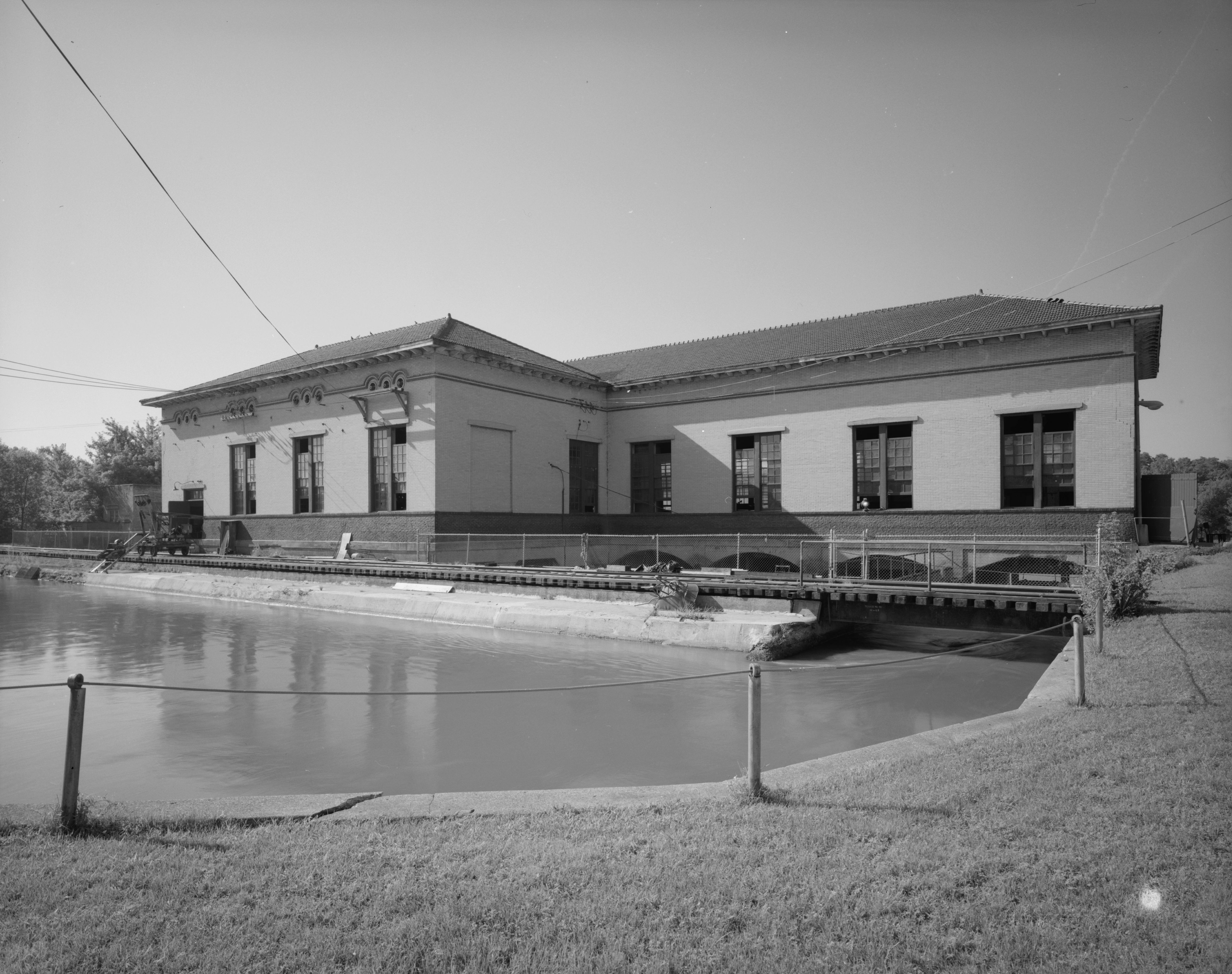
- The hydro plant, still operational, in 1986
- Location: Commercial St., Marseilles, Illinois
- Coordinates: 41.32644°N 88.71456°W
- Area: 7.6 acres (3.1 ha)
- Built: 1911
- Architect: C.W. Humphrey
- Architectural style: Classical Revival
- NRHP reference No.: 89000343
- Added to NRHP: May 9, 1989

The Marseilles Hydro Plant, also known as the Marseilles Hydro Development or the Marseilles Hydro Power Station, is a historic hydroelectric power station along the Illinois River in Marseilles, Illinois, USA.

== History ==
=== Operational period ===
Construction on the Marseilles Hydro Plant began in 1906 and was completed in 1911. The original generator house contained seven 400 kilowatt Westinghouse and General Electric generators driven by Laffel and Sampson turbine water wheels. Each turbine weighed 24 tons and spun on ironwood bearings.

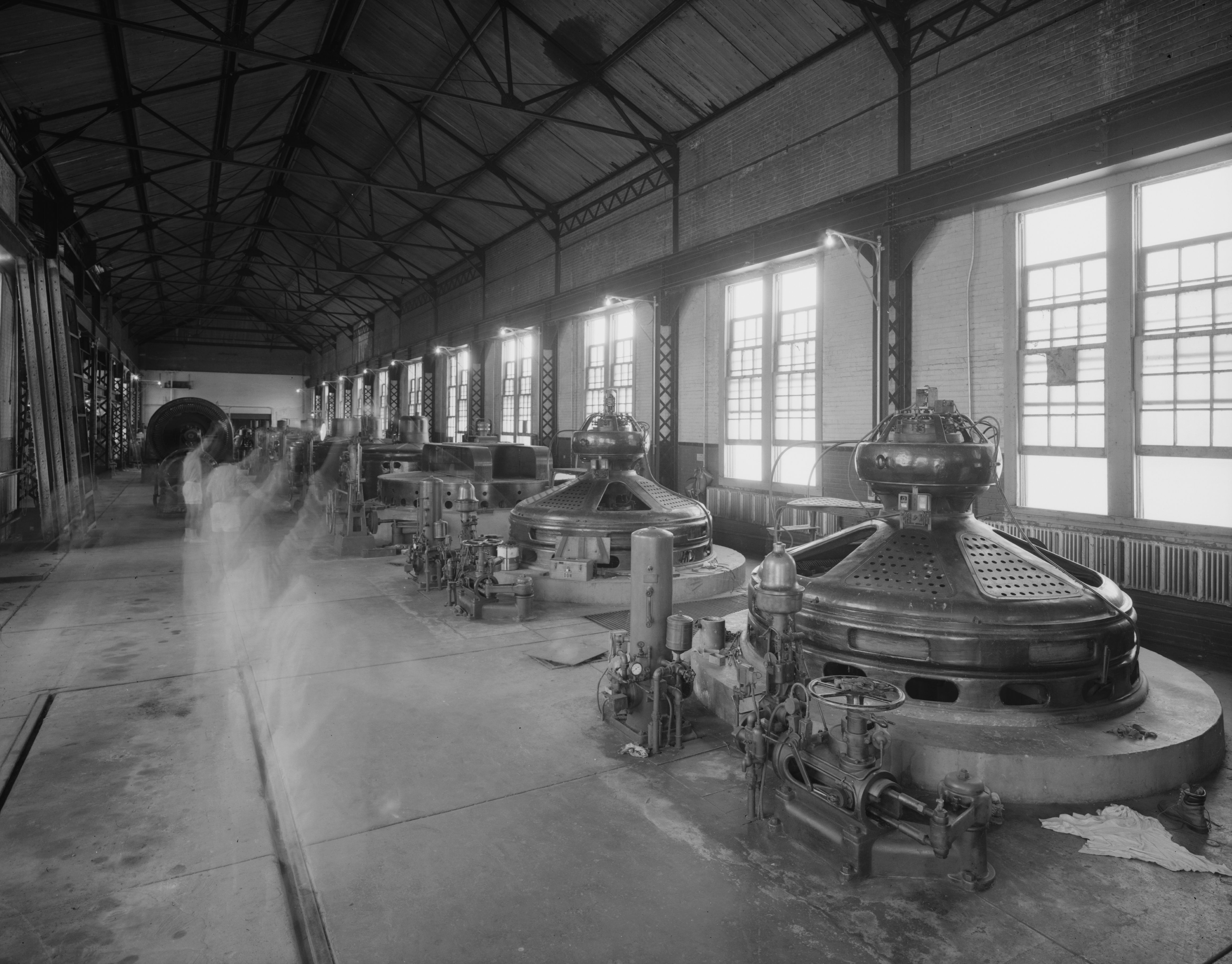
An interior view showing the generators in 1986

The plant was built by Northern Illinois Light and Traction Company (Illinois Power) In 1913 the station underwent a week of performance tests under the direction of lead design engineer C.W. Humphrey and famous architect Daniel H. Burnham. Per its design, the plant diverts water from the Illinois River into its channel, or race, where it flowed into the forebay on the north side of the building. Water then entered a basement like chamber where it drove the water wheels. The plant remained in operation from its completion until 1989.

Illinois Power operated the power station with water leased from Marseilles Land and Water Company, the lease was to last a period of 90 years, until 2001 with an option to renew until 2091. In 1933 the U.S. Army Corps of Engineers replaced the dam owned by Marseilles Land and Water and entered into an agreement in which the Corps promised to not take any actions that would jeopardize the historic output levels of the hydro plant.

Ten years after the plant was decommissioned sister companies of Marseilles Hydro Power, LLC purchased the plant and inherited the agreement between Marseilles Land and Water and Illinois Power. The agreement and ensuing events would lead to a prolonged court battle between Marseilles Land and Water and Marseilles Hydro Power, LLC.

=== Reopening discussion ===
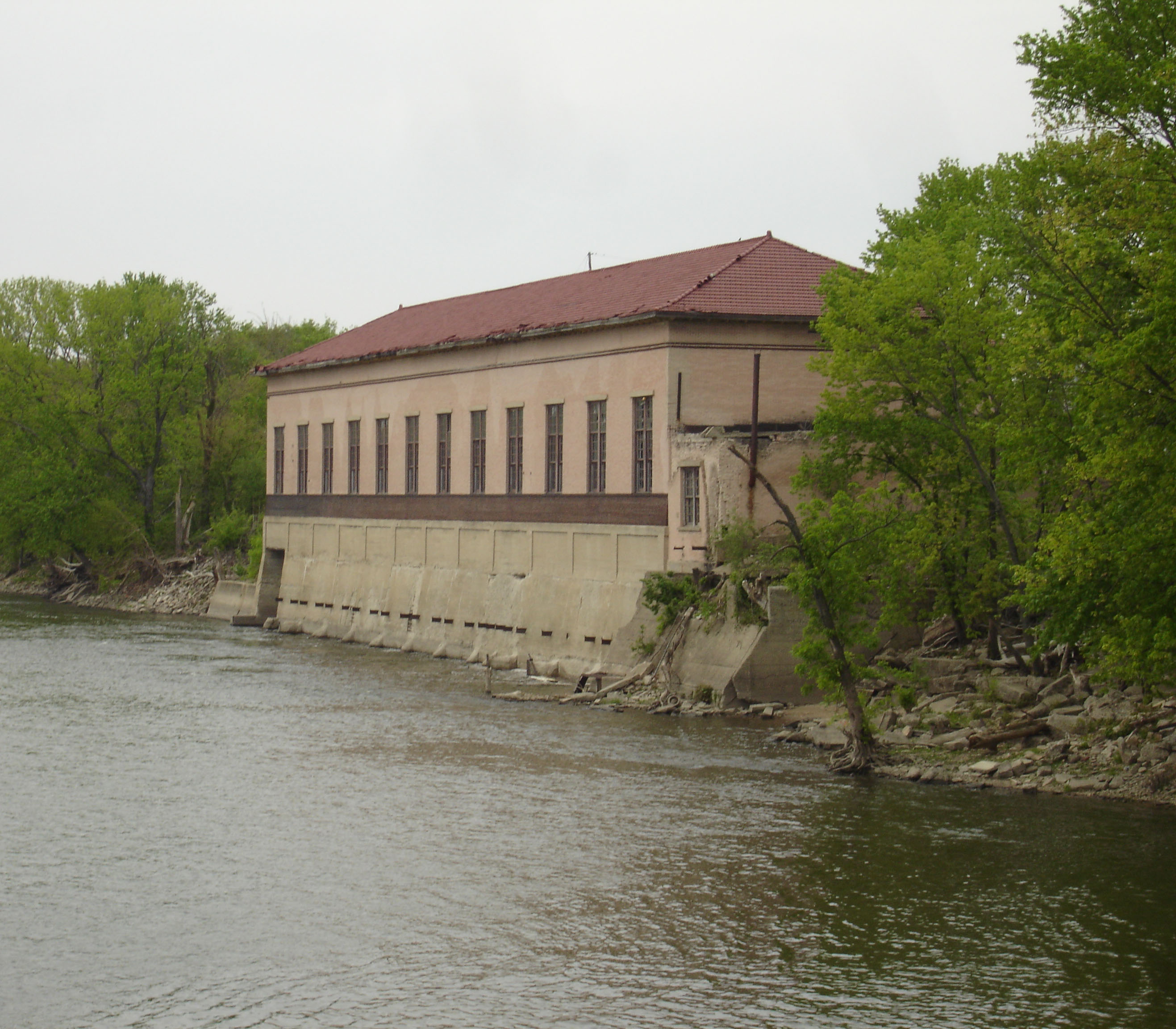
The Marseilles Hydro Plant in 2008

Between 2003 and 2006 there were three separate attempts to reopen the hydro plant and bring it back online. Those efforts were halted due to the lengthy legal battle between the canal owners and Hydro Power, LLC. In March 2008 the city of Marseilles began attempting to enter into an agreement with Marseilles Hydro Power, LLC and North American Hydro Holdings, the plant owners held back by litigation in previous years. This, despite the fact that on December 17, 2007, the Federal Energy Regulatory Commission (FERC) issued notice to Marseilles Hydro Power, LLC that the license for revitalizing and reopening the plant was about to be revoked. The company formally protested in January 2008. On April 17, 2008, the FERC found that construction at the Marseilles Hydro Plant had not begun in a timely manner per the Federal Power Act and terminated the license for the project.

== Architecture ==
The main generator building at the Marseilles Hydro Plant is cast in the Classical Revival architectural style. The station was designed under the lead of consulting and design engineer Humphrey, who had his office at The Rookery in Chicago. The rectangular generator building is immediately adjacent the Illinois River and is about 229 feet (70 m) long by 40 feet (12 m) wide; it stands 26 feet (7.9 m) tall.

== Outbuildings ==
In addition to the main generator house there are several outbuildings and other structures on the 7.6-acre (3.1 ha) site of the Marseilles Hydro Plant. The plant's forebay is an 18-foot-deep (5.5 m) pool edged with concrete retaining walls. The storehouse, a building known as the "Barn", was constructed c. 1913 and has dimensions of about 45 by 36 feet (14 by 11 m). The Oil House or "Oil Shed" is a windowless structure approximately 15 by 30 feet (4.6 by 9.1 m) in size. The overgrown site of the coal-fired steam plant is another area on the property, though only the foundations remain. The dates of the steam plant's construction and demolition are uncertain. Two other structures, a substation shed and the substation switchgear and transformers, are on site; both date from 1956.

== Historic significance ==
The Marseilles Hydro Power Station played a major role in modernizing the Illinois River Valley by providing electricity for the state's first electric trains. In addition, the site of the coal-fired steam plant has the potential to yield archaeological information about the history of power generation in the United States. The Marseilles Hydro Plant was listed on the U.S. National Register of Historic Places on May 9, 1989. The listing included four of the six outbuildings, structures and sites as contributing properties; only the structures dating from 1956 were excluded.
