= Sheets Site =

Archaeological site in Illinois, United States

- U.S. National Register of Historic Places
- Nearest city: Lewistown, Illinois
- Area: 3 acres (1.2 ha)
- NRHP reference No.: 78001146
- Added to NRHP: December 22, 1978

The Sheets Site is a prehistoric archaeological site located in Fulton County, Illinois, near the city of Lewistown. The site was occupied from roughly 700 to 400 B.C., spanning the Late Archaic and Early Woodland periods. Its inhabitants were part of the Marion Culture, a culture which lived in much of northern Illinois and neighboring states at the time; it can be identified as such by the presence of Kramer projectile points and Marion Thick pottery, the latter of which is the oldest known type of pottery found in Illinois. Firepits and hearths have also been found at the site, providing potential insight into the diet and subsistence methods of the Marion Culture.

The site was added to the National Register of Historic Places on December 22, 1978.
