= Michael Klunk Farmstead =

- U.S. National Register of Historic Places
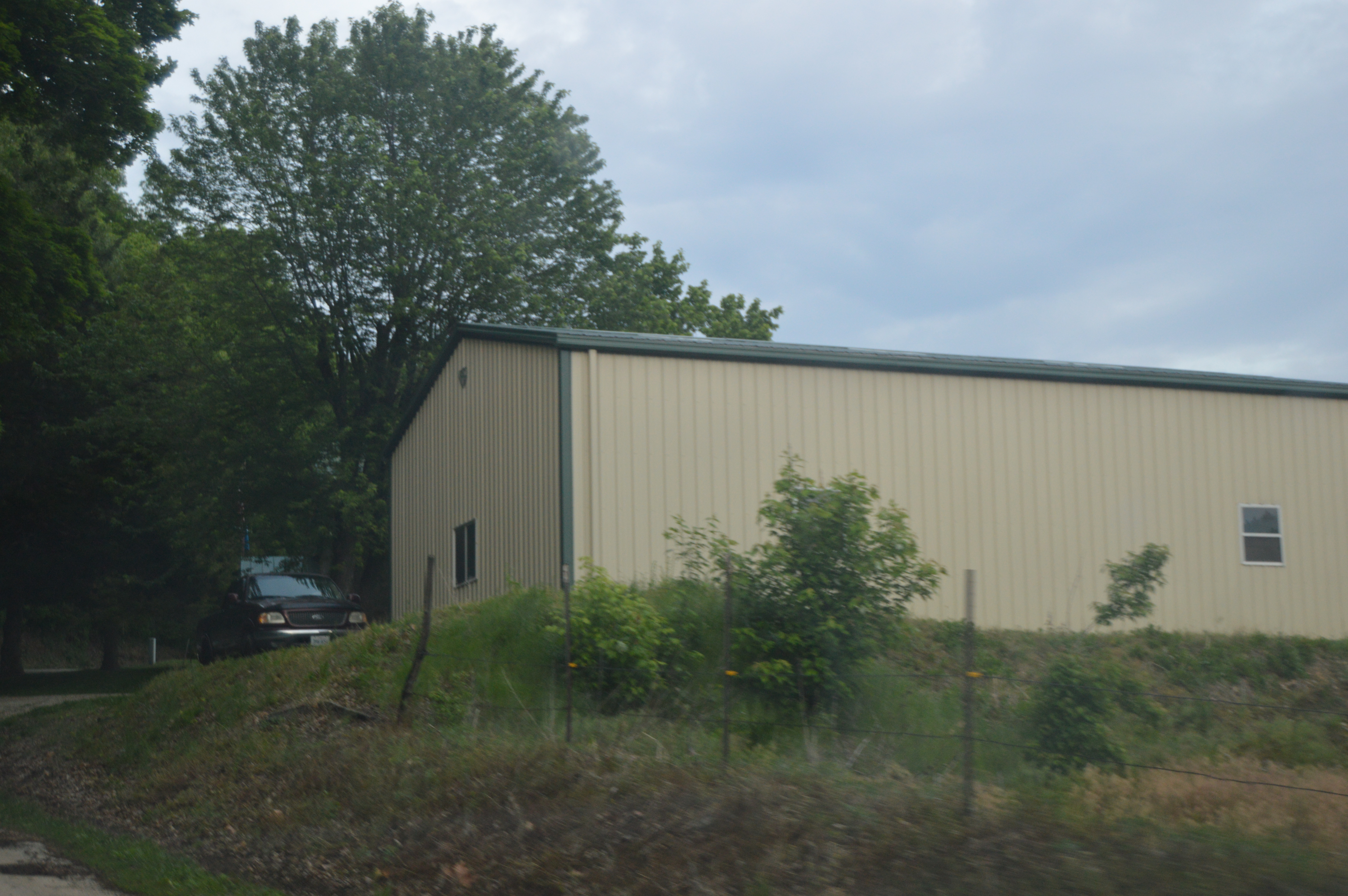

- Location within Illinois Location within the United States
- Location: Crater Creek Rd., south of Kampsville
- Coordinates: 39°15′23″N 90°38′14″W
- Area: 1.9 acres (0.77 ha)
- Built: 1830, 1875
- NRHP reference No.: 82002518
- Added to NRHP: June 23, 1982

The Michael Klunk Farmstead is a historic farm located on Crater Creek Road south of Kampsville in Calhoun County, Illinois. The farm consists of a well-preserved house and barn. Michael Klunk, an immigrant from Alsace-Lorraine, established the farm and built the barn in 1830; the north crib of the barn served as a farmhouse until the present house was completed in 1875. The barn is a log double crib barn, while the house has a central hall plan; both designs were common vernacular building types in central and southern Illinois.

The farm was added to the National Register of Historic Places on June 23, 1982.
