= Evelyn Site =

Archaeological site in Illinois, United States

- U.S. National Register of Historic Places
- Location within Illinois Location within the United States
- Nearest city: Newark, Illinois
- Coordinates: 41.53027°N 88.50722°W
- Area: 12 acres (4.9 ha)
- NRHP reference No.: 78001159
- Added to NRHP: December 19, 1978

The Evelyn Site, also referred to as Illinois Archaeological Survey No. Ke-52, is a 12-acre (4.9 ha) archaeological site near Newark in Big Grove Township, Kendall County, Illinois, United States.

The site contains utensils from a camp or village on a dried-up lake - dating from the early to middle Archaic period, roughly around 1650 B.C. The site was uncovered in the mid-1970s during the construction of Commonwealth Edison high power lines. The site was named by the Evelyn family, who owned the farm on which the site is located, in the nineteenth century. It was excavated by archaeologists from Northwestern University. To preserve its potential to reveal information about archaic period living, the site was listed on the National Register of Historic Places by the National Park Service on December 19, 1978.
