= Cleiman Mound and Village Site =

Archaeological site in Illinois, United States

- U.S. National Register of Historic Places
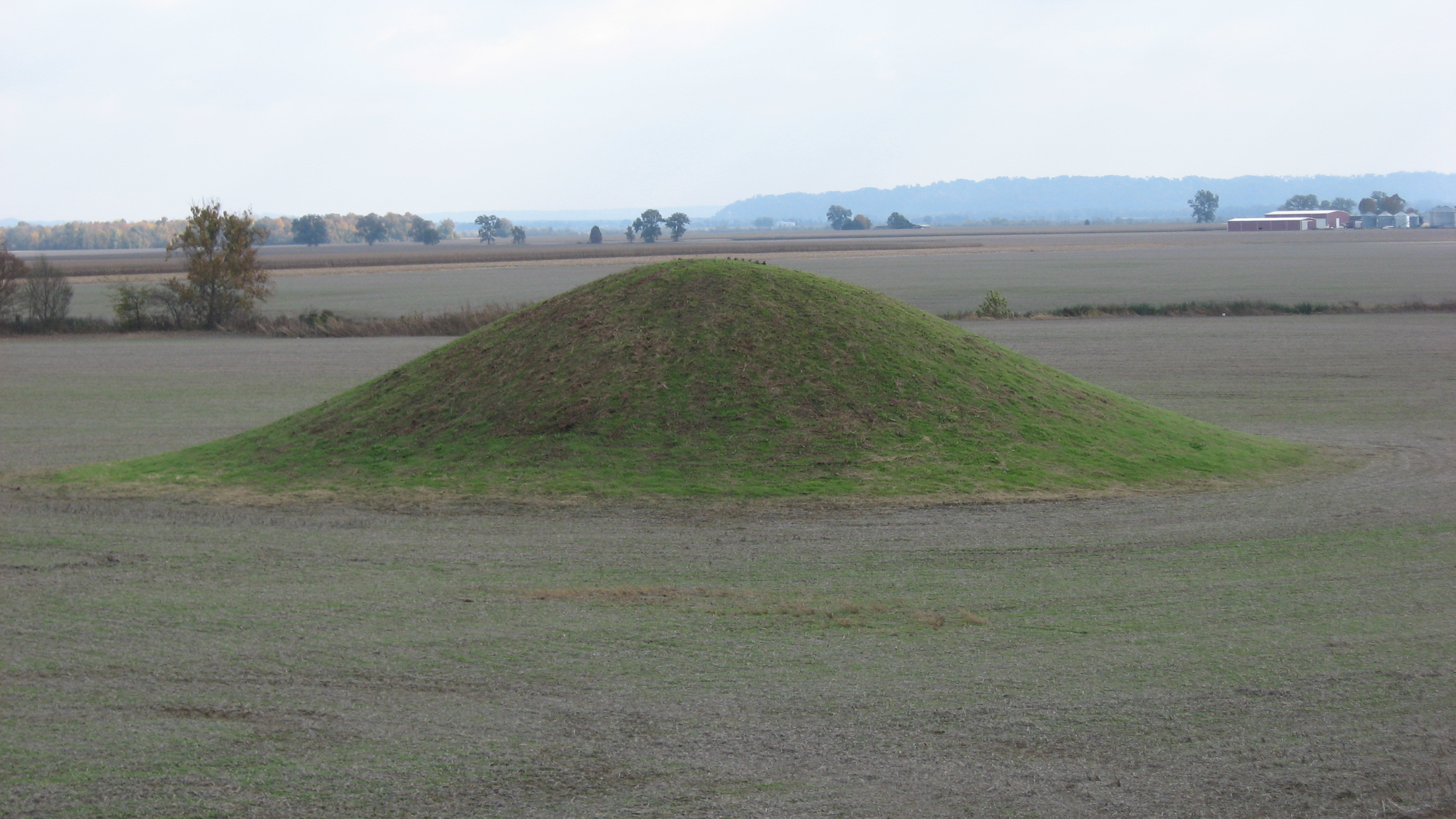
- Cleiman Mound, with the village site in the background

- Location within Illinois Location within the United States
- Location: Northeast of the junction of Big Lake and Thomas Town Rds.
- Nearest city: Gorham, Illinois
- Coordinates: 37°47′12″N 89°32′05″W
- Area: 129 acres (52 ha)
- NRHP reference No.: 77000487
- Added to NRHP: October 18, 1977

The Cleiman Mound and Village Site is a prehistoric archaeological site located near the Mississippi River in Jackson County, Illinois. The site includes an intact burial mound and the remains of a village site. The village was inhabited by a number of prehistoric cultures during the Archaic, Woodland, and Mississippian periods; settlement at the site began prior to 400 B.C. and lasted through 1300 A.D. The mound was built during the Middle Woodland Period by Hopewellian peoples and is likely the only Hopewell mound in the Mississippi Valley in Southern Illinois.

The site was added to the National Register of Historic Places on October 18, 1977.
