= Kamp Mound Site =

Archaeological site in Illinois, United States

- U.S. National Register of Historic Places
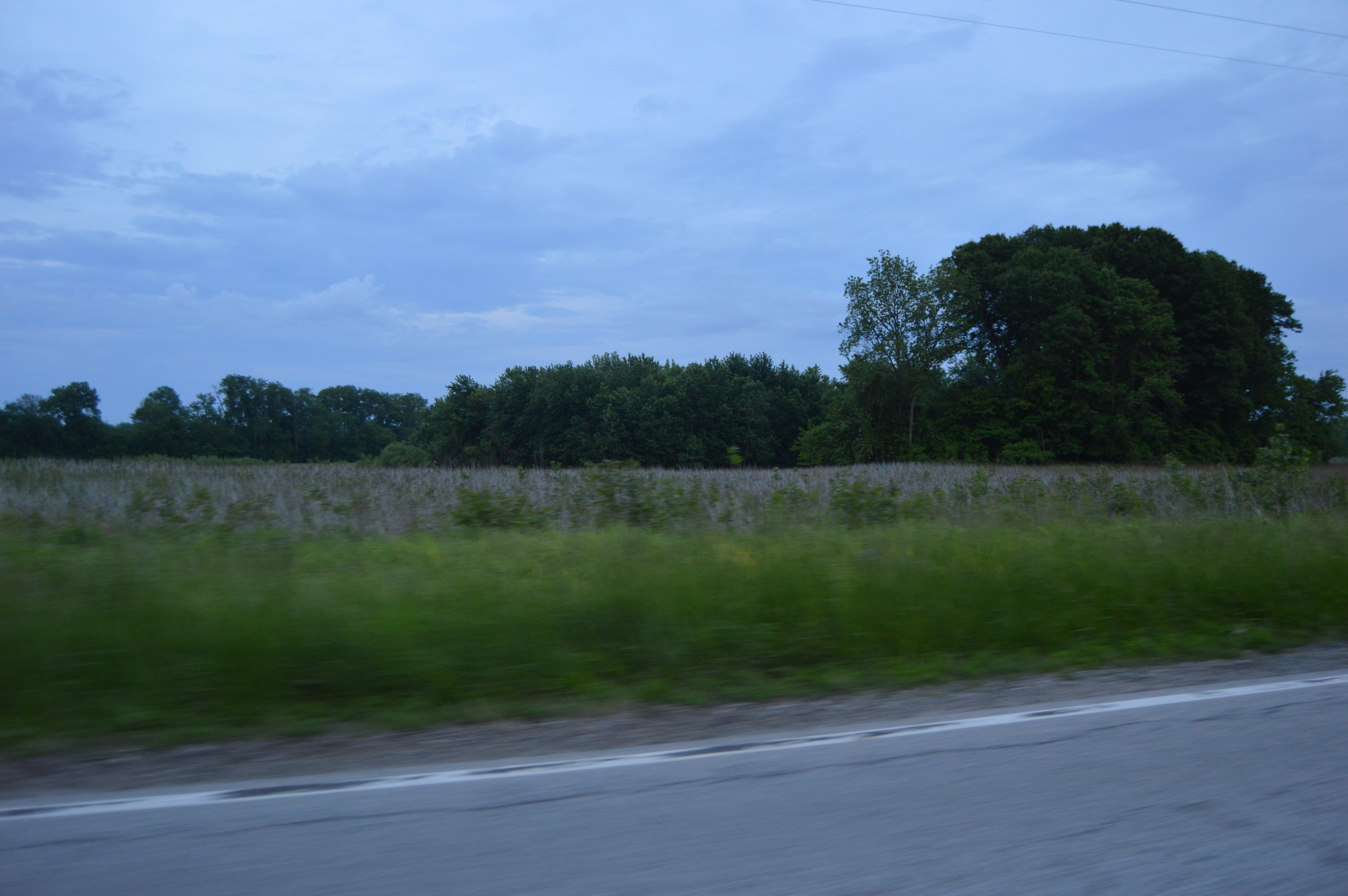
- Fields in the associated village site

- Location within Illinois Location within the United States
- Location: Illinois Route 100 north of Kampsville
- Coordinates: 39°19′56″N 90°37′15″W
- Area: 20 acres (8.1 ha)
- NRHP reference No.: 78001114
- Added to NRHP: August 24, 1978

The Kamp Mound Site is a prehistoric mound and village site located along the Illinois River and Illinois Route 100 north of Kampsville, Illinois. The Hopewellian site includes seven mounds dating from 100 B.C. - 450 A.D. and a village site dating from 450 to 700 A.D. The Havana Hopewell culture used the complex as a ceremonial and burial site. Archaeologists have also proposed that the site served as a regional trade center for the Hopewellian exchange system. The seven mounds at the site, which were originally part of a group of ten, include some of Illinois' largest mounds. In addition, large amounts of shell and animal bone fragments have been recovered from the site.

The site was added to the National Register of Historic Places on August 24, 1978.

== See also ==
- List of archaeological sites on the National Register of Historic Places in Illinois
