= Horseshoe Lake Mound and Village Site =

Archaeological site in Illinois, United States

- U.S. National Register of Historic Places
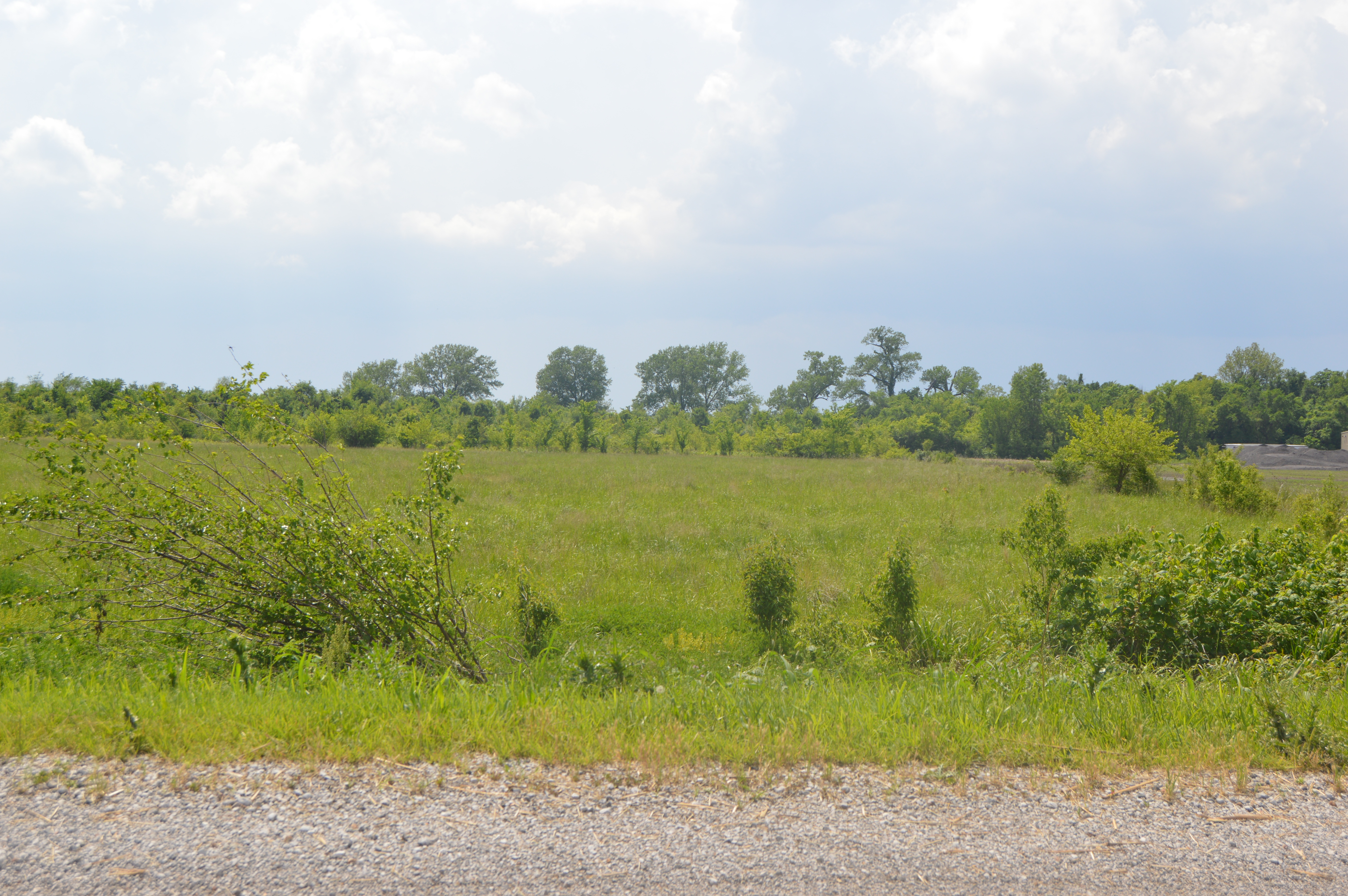
- Village area

- Location within Illinois Location within the United States
- Location: Southwest of the junction of Illinois Route 111 and Horseshoe Lake Rd., Granite City, Illinois
- Coordinates: 38°42′15″N 90°4′7″W
- Area: 17 acres (6.9 ha)
- NRHP reference No.: 80001396
- Added to NRHP: November 26, 1980

The Horseshoe Lake Mound and Village Site is a pre-Columbian archaeological site located on the northeast shore of Horseshoe Lake in Madison County, Illinois. The site includes a platform temple mound and a village site with the remains of multiple houses. The site was inhabited by Mississippian peoples during the Late Woodland period from roughly 600-1050 A.D. The village at the site was part of the settlement system connected to Cahokia; it was a third line community, a class of community distinguished by a single temple mound, in the system. Of the five known third line communities in the Cahokia system, the Horseshoe Lake Site is the only one which is relatively intact. The site also includes substantial plant and animal remains, which indicate that its settlers produced maize.

The site was added to the National Register of Historic Places on November 26, 1980.
