= Orr-Herl Mound and Village Site =

Archaeological site in Illinois, United States

- U.S. National Register of Historic Places
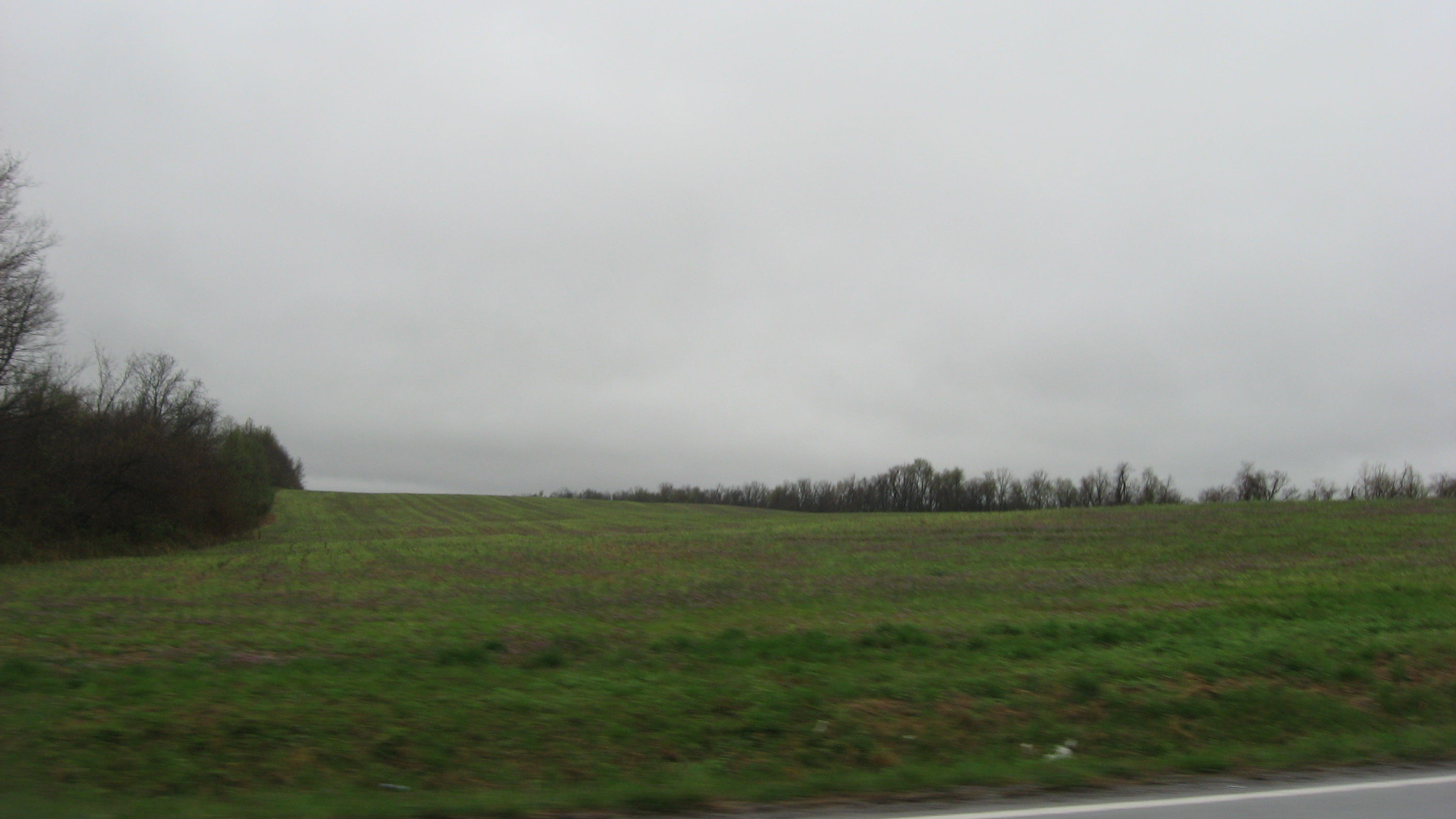
- The village site as seen from Illinois Route 146

- Location within Illinois Location within the United States
- Nearest city: Rosiclare, Illinois
- Coordinates: 37°26′04″N 88°19′39″W
- Area: 40 acres (16 ha)
- NRHP reference No.: 78001151
- Added to NRHP: November 21, 1978

The Orr-Herl Mound and Village Site is an archaeological site located along the Ohio River in Hardin County, Illinois, United States. The site consists of a mound, which includes a sizable midden, and the remains of a village. The village was inhabited from roughly 900 to 1500 AD by Mississippian peoples. The site was an important source of fluorspar, which Mississippian peoples used for carvings and beads. The village was likely a manufacturing site for fluorspar items, which were then traded to other villages; this theory is supported by fluorspar artifacts recovered from the Kincaid Site, a Mississippian chiefdom center on the Ohio River in Illinois.

The site was added to the National Register of Historic Places on November 21, 1978.
