= John Chapman Village Site =

Archaeological site in Illinois, United States

- U.S. National Register of Historic Places
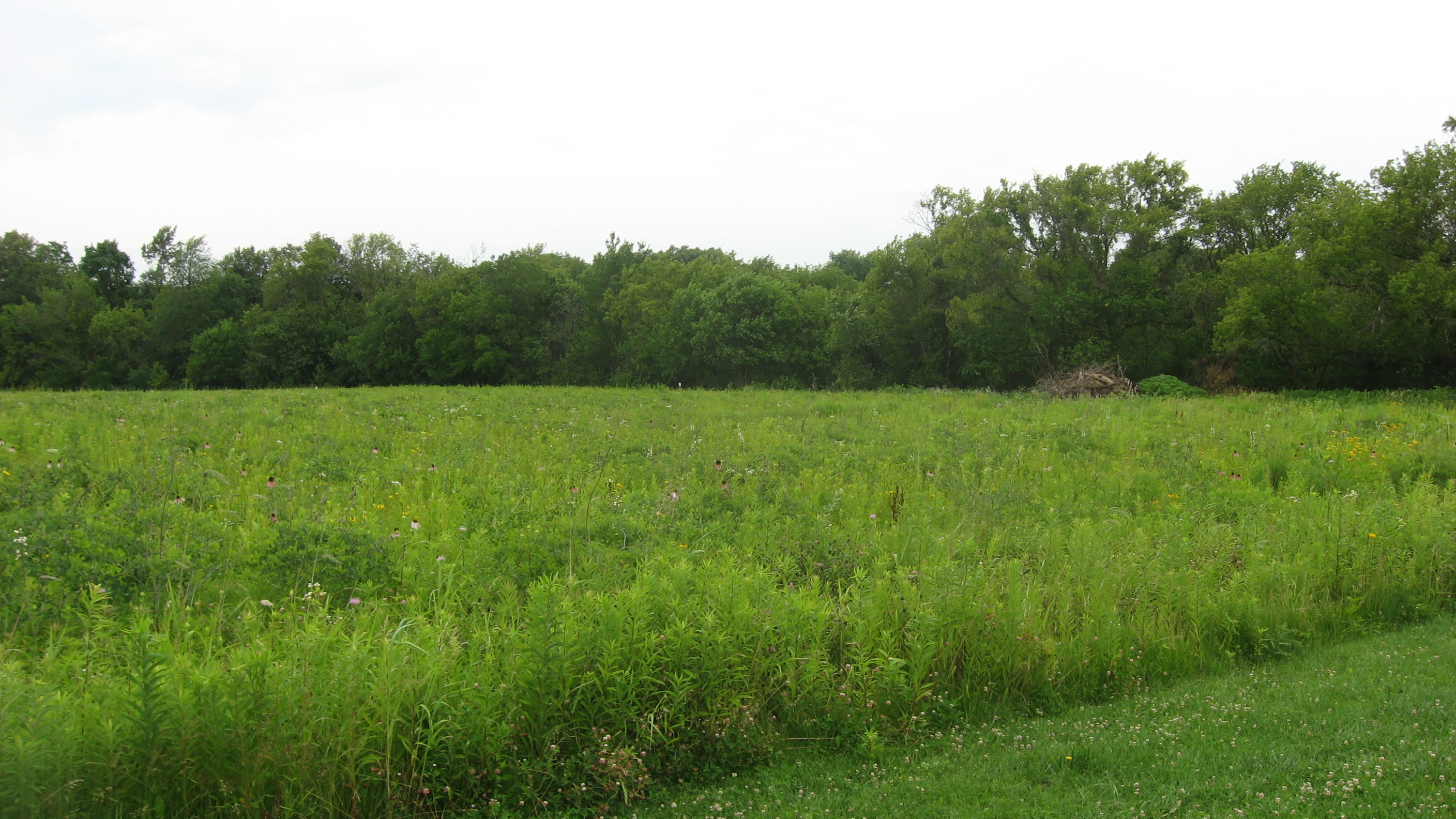
- Location: Along Illinois Route 84 south of Hanover, Illinois
- Area: 53.6 acres (21.7 ha)
- Built: 1170
- Architectural style: earthwork
- NRHP reference No.: 09001058
- Added to NRHP: December 10, 2009

The John Chapman Village Site is a prehistoric archaeological site in the Apple River Valley, south of Hanover, Illinois. It includes a village area and a platform mound, the latter being the only known platform mound in the Apple River Valley. The village was inhabited from roughly 1100 to 1250 A.D., towards the end of the Late Woodland period and the beginning of the Mississippian period. It is associated with the Bennett Phase, a transitional period between the two. Archaeologists have proposed that the site was part of a trade network between Cahokia and settlements further north, such as Aztalan, based on artifacts discovered there.

The site was added to the National Register of Historic Places on December 10, 2009.
