= Grand Tower Mining, Manufacturing and Transportation Company Site =

- U.S. National Register of Historic Places
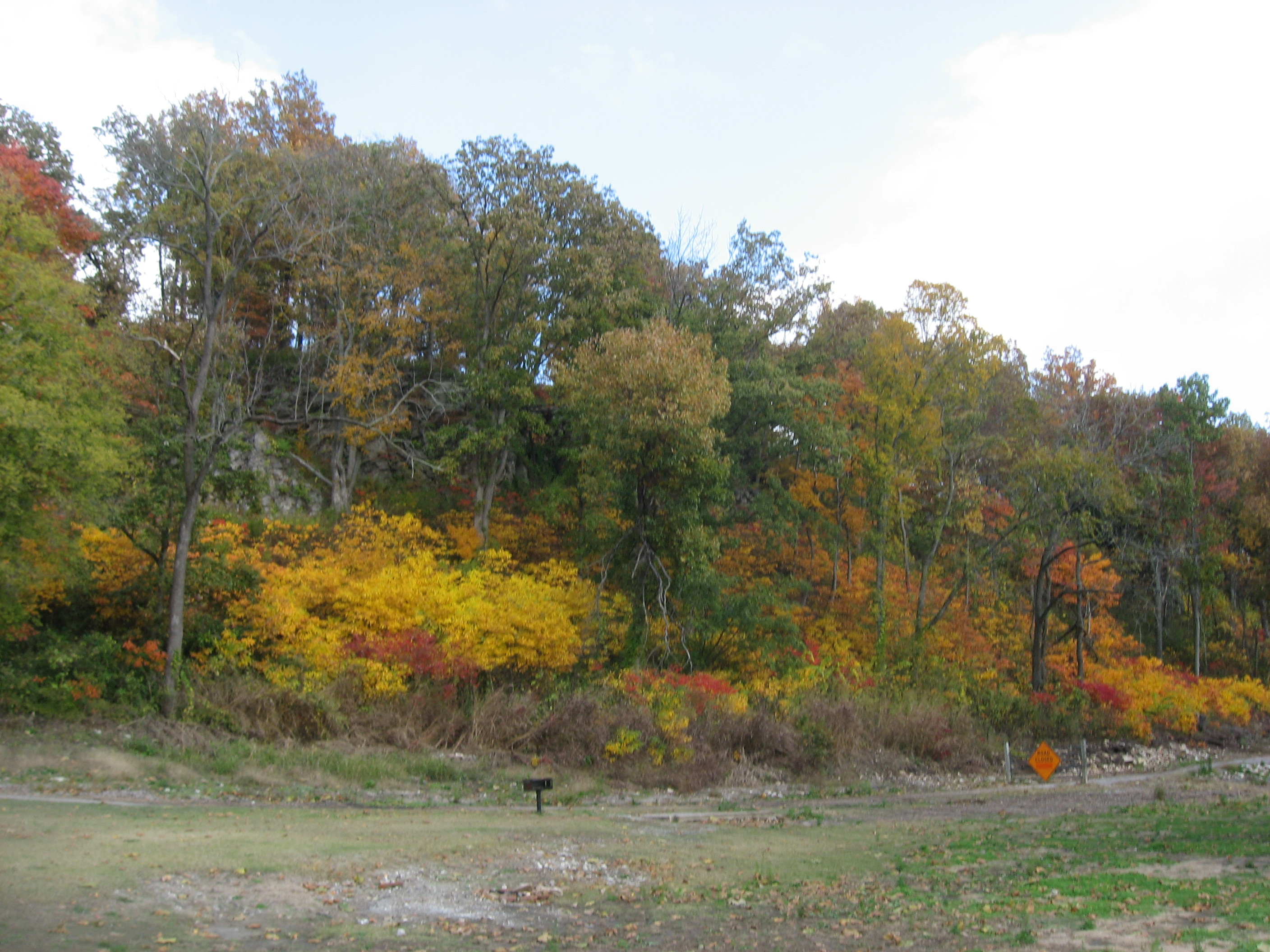
- A hillside in the district

- Location within Illinois Location within the United States
- Location: Devil's Backbone Park, Grand Tower, Illinois
- Coordinates: 37°38′06″N 89°20′13″W
- Area: 23 acres (9.3 ha)
- Built: 1869
- NRHP reference No.: 79000839
- Added to NRHP: April 13, 1979

The Grand Tower Mining, Manufacturing and Transportation Company Site is a 23-acre (9.3 ha) industrial site located in Devil's Backbone Park in Grand Tower, Illinois. The site was operated by the Grand Tower Mining, Manufacturing and Transportation Company, a mining and industrial company which operated in Illinois in the 1860s and 1870s. The furnaces at the site were used to produce coke, a fuel produced from the coal used in iron smelting. The coke produced at the site was likely shipped to an iron furnace 1 mile (1.6 km) south of the site. The site also includes the remains of the superintendent's house; a local legend claims that the house is haunted by the superintendent's daughter.

The site was added to the National Register of Historic Places on April 13, 1979.
