= Naples Archeological District =

Archaeological site in Illinois, United States

- U.S. National Register of Historic Places
- U.S. Historic district
- Location within Illinois Location within the United States
- Nearest city: Naples, Illinois
- Coordinates: 39°44′18″N 90°37′06″W
- Area: 1,020 acres (410 ha)
- NRHP reference No.: 79000869
- Added to NRHP: December 22, 1979

The Naples Archeological District is an archaeological district located on the east bank of the Illinois River at Naples, Illinois. The district includes sixteen archaeological sites which were primarily occupied during the Woodland period. The area was most active during the Middle Woodland period, when it served as an important trade site in the Hopewell exchange system. Over a dozen mounds are included in the district; these mounds mainly served as burial sites, though a number were used to store refuse. The area also includes several large village sites, as Naples was a habitation site in addition to a trade center.

The district was added to the National Register of Historic Places on December 22, 1979.
