= Sleeth Site =

Archaeological site in Illinois, United States

- U.S. National Register of Historic Places
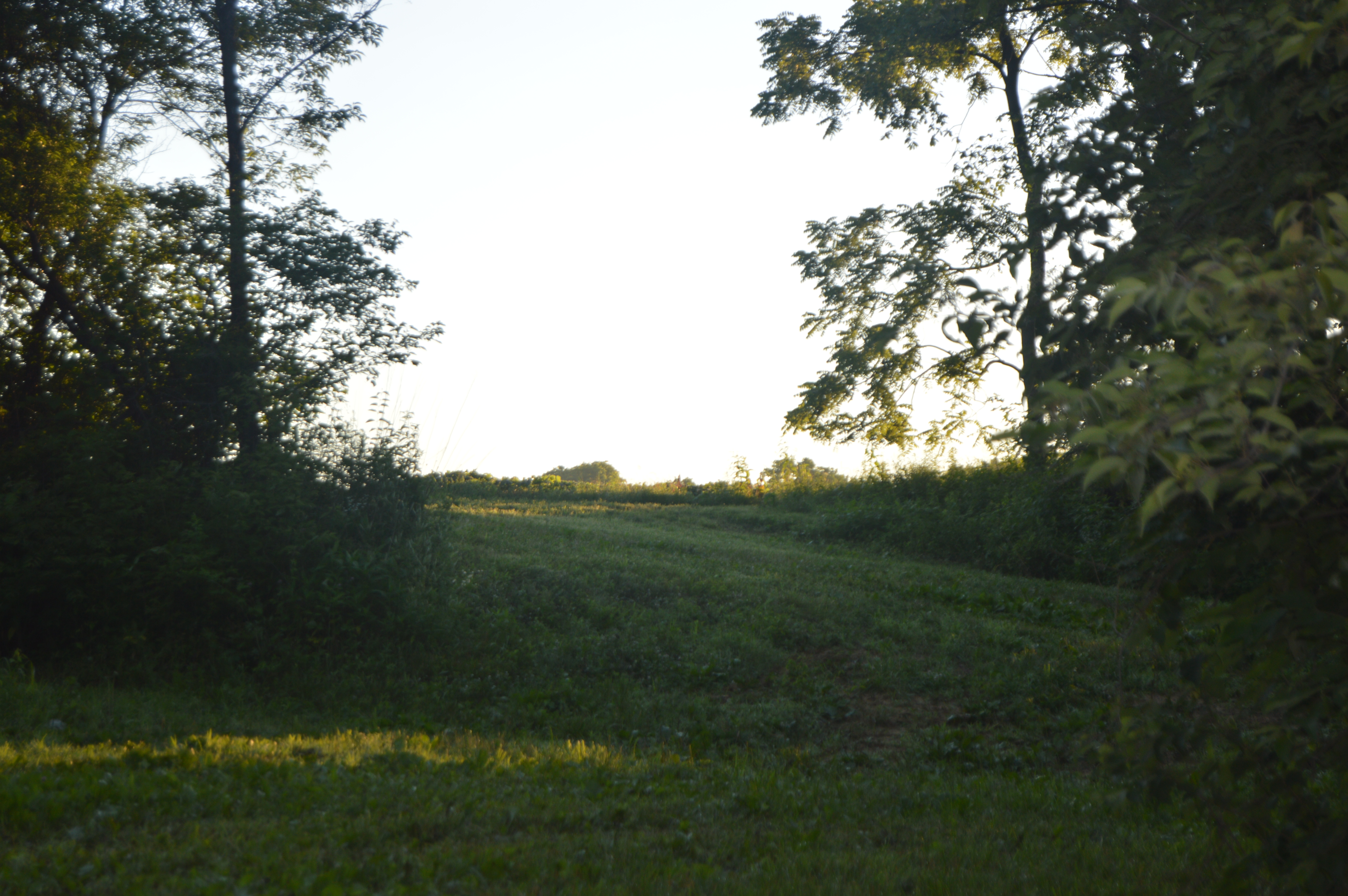
- Nearest city: Liverpool, Illinois
- Area: 10 acres (4.0 ha)
- NRHP reference No.: 79000837
- Added to NRHP: May 17, 1979

The Sleeth Site is an archaeological site located near Liverpool in Fulton County, Illinois. The side encompasses a 10-acre (4.0 ha) village area including a sizable midden. The site was occupied by people of the Spoon River Culture, a local culture within the Middle Mississippian culture; it is the only known site within the Sleeth Phase of the culture and has been dated to 1500 A.D. Cultural artifacts recovered from the site include many projectile points and pottery shards from jars, plates, and bowls.

The site was added to the National Register of Historic Places on May 17, 1979.
