= Lunsford-Pulcher Archeological Site =

Archaeological site in Illinois, United States

- U.S. National Register of Historic Places
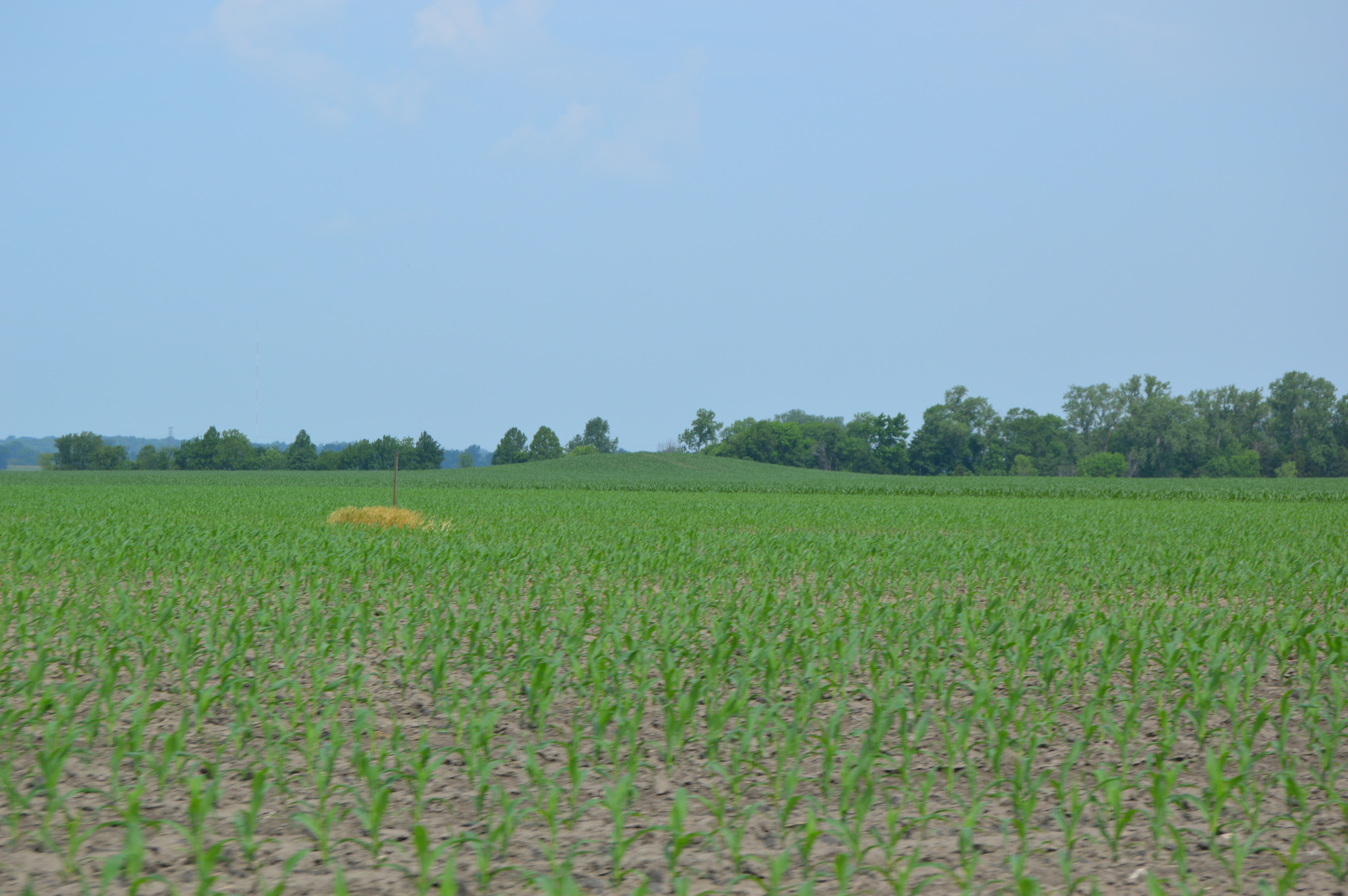
- Site overview from east.jpg

- Location within Illinois Location within the United States
- Location: Western side of Oklahoma Hill Rd., Columbia, Illinois
- Coordinates: 38°29′40″N 90°13′52″W
- Area: 340 acres (140 ha)
- NRHP reference No.: 73000712
- Added to NRHP: July 23, 1973

The Lunsford-Pulcher Archeological Site is a prehistoric archaeological site in rural Monroe and St. Clair counties in Illinois. The site was the location of a Middle Mississippian village which was probably a satellite community of Cahokia. Several pyramidal burial mounds are included in the site. Archaeological excavations at the site have also discovered the remains of houses and garden beds, making the site one of the few Mississippian villages at which garden beds have been found. The site has been known to European settlers since early settlement of the area in the late 18th century; despite being used for farmland, the site remains in good condition.

The site was added to the National Register of Historic Places on July 23, 1973.
