= McCune Mound and Village Site =

Historic archaeological site in Illinois

- U.S. National Register of Historic Places
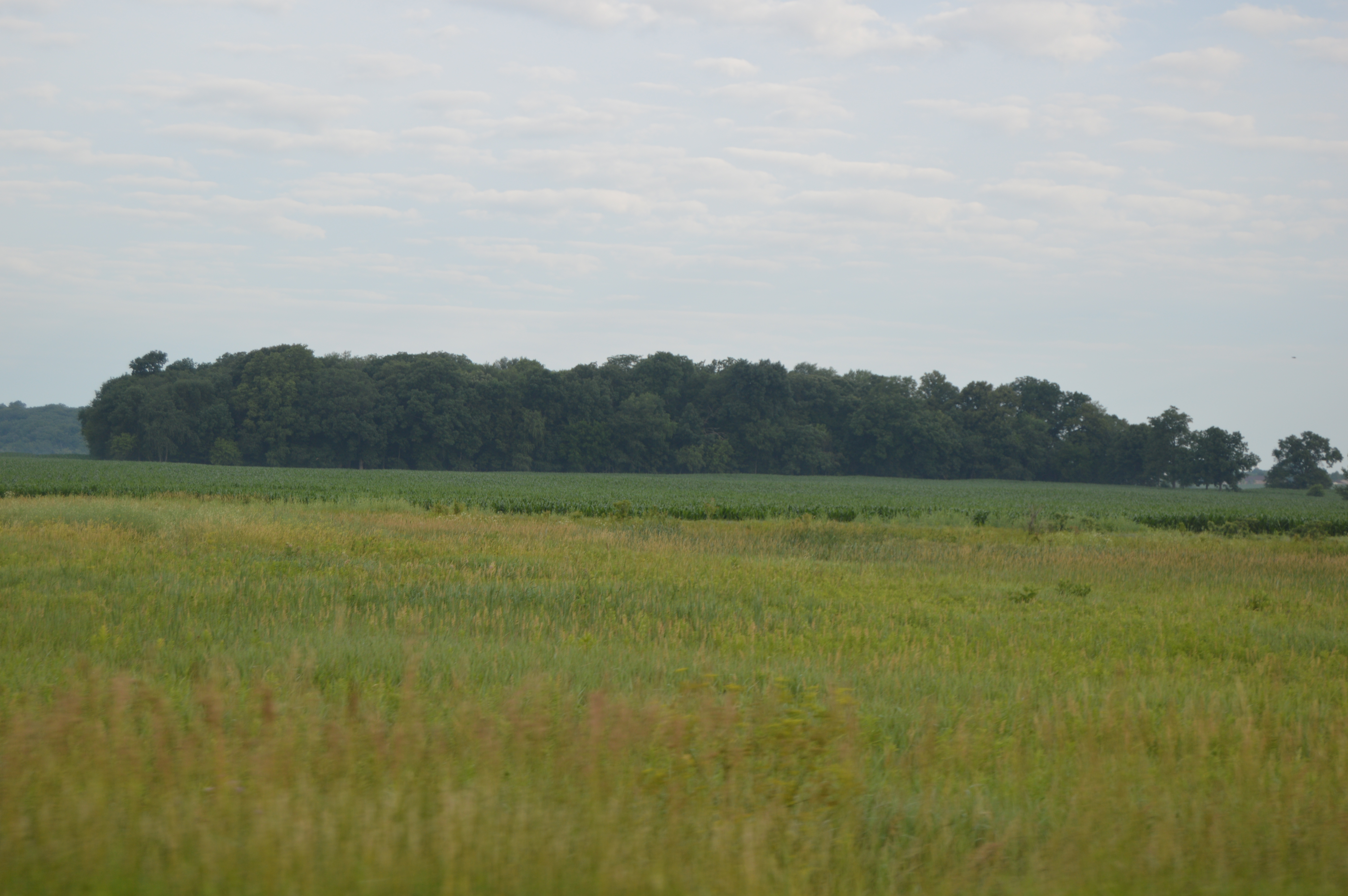
- Nearest city: Sterling, Illinois
- Area: 12 acres (4.9 ha)
- NRHP reference No.: 79000873
- Added to NRHP: August 16, 1979

The McCune Mound and Village Site is a prehistoric archaeological site located in Whiteside County, Illinois near the city of Sterling. The site consists of a single mound, 3 metres (9.8 ft) high and 23 metres (75 ft) in diameter, and five depressions that may have been housing sites. The site was occupied by Upper Mississippian peoples from roughly 1200 to 1500 A.D.; it is considered part of the Langford tradition, a subset of Upper Mississippian culture found in northwestern Illinois. Modern archaeologists first documented the site in 1961. As a relatively intact site with a single-component habitation, the site was considered to have the potential to provide significant information on the Langford tradition.

The site was added to the National Register of Historic Places on August 16, 1979.
