= Clayton, Illinois =

Village in Illinois, United States

- Village
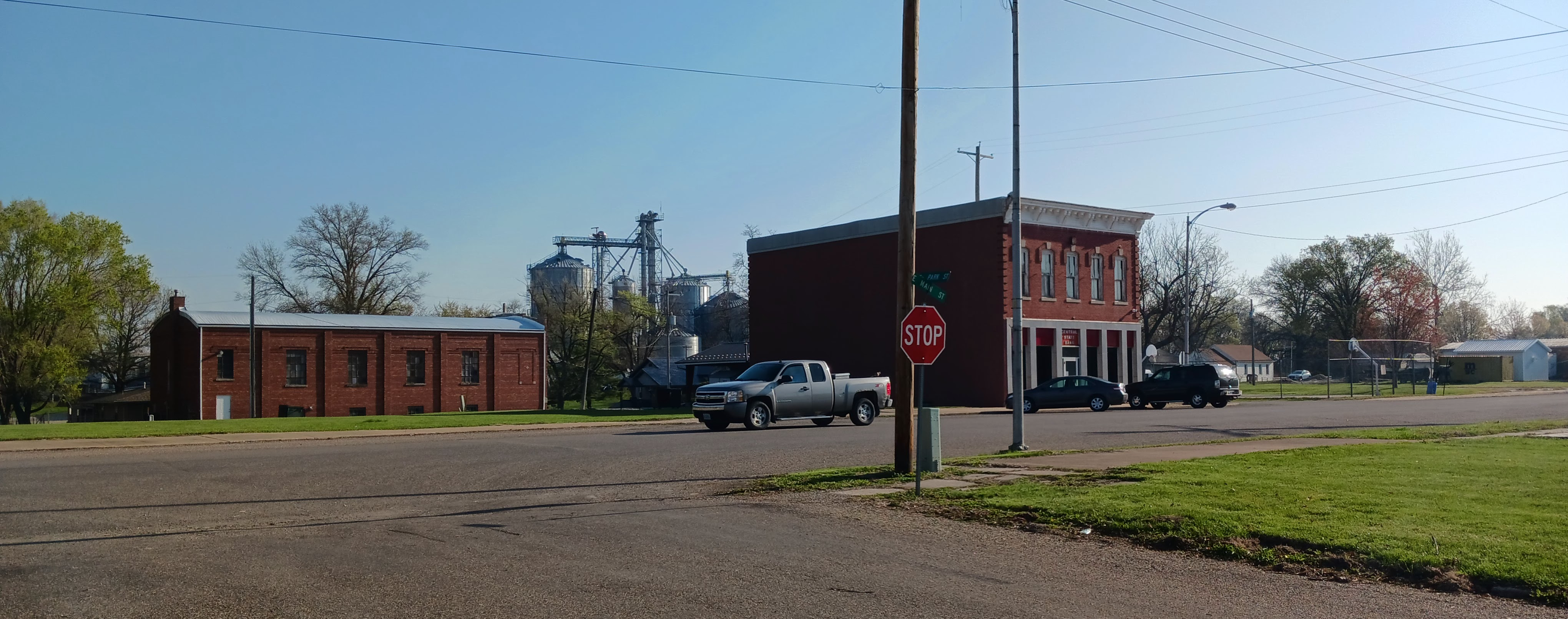
- Park and Main Streets in Clayton

- Location of Clayton in Adams County, Illinois.
- Coordinates: 40°01′48″N 90°57′29″W
- Country: United States
- State: Illinois
- County: Adams
- Township: Clayton
- Founded: 1834
- Named after: Henry Clay

Area
  - Total: 0.89 sq mi (2.31 km^{2})
  - Land: 0.88 sq mi (2.29 km^{2})
  - Water: 0.0077 sq mi (0.02 km^{2})
- Elevation: 728 ft (222 m)

Population (2020)
  - Total: 639
  - Estimate (2024): 616 ▼
  - Density: 723/sq mi (279/km^{2})
- Time zone: UTC-6 (CST)
  - Summer (DST): UTC-5 (CDT)
- ZIP code: 62324
- Area code: 217
- FIPS code: 17-14767
- GNIS feature ID: 2397640
- Website: villageofclaytonil.com

Clayton is a village in Adams County, Illinois, United States. As of the 2020 census, the total population was 639 people, down from 709 at the 2010 census. It is part of the Quincy, IL–MO Micropolitan Statistical Area.

== History ==
Clayton is named for Kentucky statesman Henry Clay. It was established in 1834.

=== Registered Historic Places ===
- John Roy Site

== Geography ==
According to the 2021 census gazetteer files, Clayton has a total area of 0.89 square miles (2.31 km^{2}), of which 0.88 square miles (2.28 km^{2}) (or 99.10%) is land and 0.01 square miles (0.03 km^{2}) (or 0.90%) is water.

== Demographics ==
Historical population
Census	Pop.	Note	%±
1880	941		—
1890	1,033		9.8%
1900	996		−3.6%
1910	940		−5.6%
1920	1,038		10.4%
1930	965		−7.0%
1940	1,028		6.5%
1950	866		−15.8%
1960	774		−10.6%
1970	727		−6.1%
1980	889		22.3%
1990	726		−18.3%
2000	904		24.5%
2010	709		−21.6%
2020	639		−9.9%
U.S. Decennial Census

As of the 2020 census there were 639 people, 300 households, and 181 families residing in the village. The population density was 716.37 inhabitants per square mile (276.59/km^{2}). There were 344 housing units at an average density of 385.65 per square mile (148.90/km^{2}). The racial makeup of the village was 92.80% White, 1.41% African American, 0.47% Asian, 0.47% from other races, and 4.85% from two or more races. Hispanic or Latino of any race were 1.88% of the population.

There were 300 households, out of which 25.3% had children under the age of 18 living with them, 37.33% were married couples living together, 15.33% had a female householder with no husband present, and 39.67% were non-families. 35.33% of all households were made up of individuals, and 14.67% had someone living alone who was 65 years of age or older. The average household size was 2.35 and the average family size was 1.95.

The village's age distribution consisted of 20.0% under the age of 18, 10.4% from 18 to 24, 20.8% from 25 to 44, 23.8% from 45 to 64, and 24.8% who were 65 years of age or older. The median age was 44.4 years. For every 100 females, there were 102.4 males. For every 100 females age 18 and over, there were 96.6 males.

The median income for a household in the village was $44,583, and the median income for a family was $53,015. Males had a median income of $42,083 versus $17,679 for females. The per capita income for the village was $25,220. About 17.1% of families and 21.4% of the population were below the poverty line, including 20.5% of those under age 18 and 15.2% of those age 65 or over.

== Notable people ==
- John Anderson (1922–1992), actor, born in Clayton
- Theodore "Ted" Coggeshall (1904-1926), 1st white man executed in the electric chair in Georgia, born in Clayton
- Vivian Hickey (1916–2016), Illinois state senator and educator, born in Clayton
- Mary K. Meany (1897–2000), Illinois state representative, born in Clayton
