= Windrose Site =

Archaeological site in Illinois, United States

- U.S. National Register of Historic Places
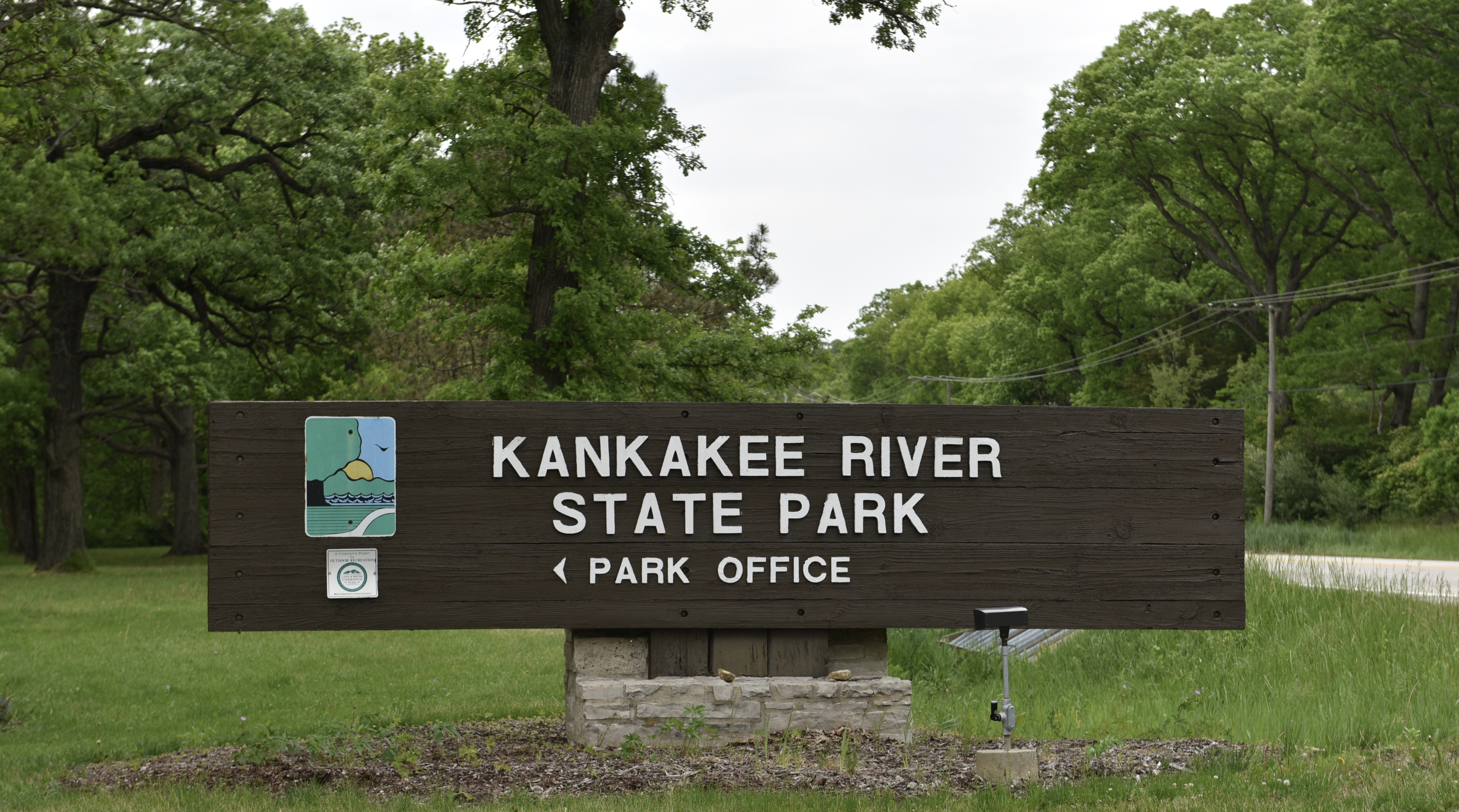
- Sign for Kankakee River State Park, which includes the historic Windrose Site.
- Nearest city: Bourbonnais, Illinois
- Area: 39 acres (16 ha)
- NRHP reference No.: 00000412
- Added to NRHP: April 28, 2000

The Windrose Site is a 19th-century Potawatomi village site in Kankakee County, Illinois. The site is likely associated with a Potawatomi village named "Rock" or "Little Rock" (likely Senis in Potawatomi); it was occupied from circa 1775 until the Potawatomi were forcibly removed from Illinois in the 1830s. Many of the artifacts recovered from the site are related to the fur trade, a large part of the Potawatomi economy and a source of cultural interaction between the Potawatomi and Europeans. The majority of the artifacts reflect traditional Potawatomi culture, including smoking pipes used for religious rituals. Items deriving from the U.S. government's efforts at the time to force European culture upon Native Americans represent less than 5% of those found at the site, a sign that these efforts were not particularly successful with the Potawatomi.
