= Sims, Illinois =

Sims
- Village
- Location of Sims in Wayne County, Illinois.
- Coordinates: 38°21′43″N 88°32′08″W
- Country: United States
- State: Illinois
- County: Wayne

Area
  - Total: 1.18 sq mi (3.06 km^{2})
  - Land: 1.18 sq mi (3.06 km^{2})
  - Water: 0 sq mi (0.00 km^{2})
- Elevation: 423 ft (129 m)

Population (2020)
  - Total: 166
  - Density: 140.5/sq mi (54.24/km^{2})
- Time zone: UTC-6 (CST)
  - Summer (DST): UTC-5 (CDT)
- ZIP code: 62886
- Area code: 618
- FIPS code: 17-70031
- GNIS feature ID: 2399825

Sims is a village in Wayne County, Illinois, United States. The population was 166 at the 2020 census.

== History of Sims ==
Sims was originally founded as Arrington Township in 1812 by Joseph White, Thomas Waken, and George Waken. The community has had five names; Arrington, Arrington Station, Simms, Simms Station, and Sims.

Sims was established as a village in 1882 along the Airline Railroad after land owned by John Simms was surveyed.

=== Bombing of General Baptist Church ===
On March 11, 1915, a group of footmen called the "Black Hatters" bombed General Baptist Church (now named Sims Missionary Baptist) and desecrated the altar with animal remains.

All persons involved were convicted and sent to prison for their crimes and the congregation continued to hold services in 1995, where a new church building was constructed.

== Geography ==
According to the 2010 census, Sims has a total area of 1.2 square miles (3.11 km^{2}), all land.

== Demographics ==
Historical population
Census	Pop.	Note	%±
1910	399		—
1920	429		7.5%
1930	308		−28.2%
1940	358		16.2%
1950	408		14.0%
1960	376		−7.8%
1970	317		−15.7%
1980	355		12.0%
1990	338		−4.8%
2000	273		−19.2%
2010	252		−7.7%
2020	166		−34.1%
U.S. Decennial Census

As of the census of 2000, there were 273 people, 100 households, and 70 families residing in the village. The population density was 220.5 inhabitants per square mile (85.1/km^{2}). There were 120 housing units at an average density of 100.5 per square mile (38.8/km^{2}). The racial makeup of the village was 100% White, 0% African American and 0% Asian.

There were 102 households, out of which 34.3% had children under the age of 18 living with them, 50.0% were married couples living together, 10.6% had a female householder with no husband present, and 20.5% were non-families. 15.6% of all households were made up of individuals, and 6.9% had someone living alone who was 65 years of age or older. The average household size was 2.68 and the average family size was 3.00.

In the village, the population was spread out, with 27.8% under the age of 18, 7.7% from 18 to 24, 52.1% from 25 to 44, 29.9% from 45 to 64, and 18.5% who were 65 years of age or older. The median age was 32 years. For every 100 females, there were 95.0 males. For every 100 females age 18 and over, there were 93.1 males.

The median income for a household in the village was $29,983, and the median income for a family was $25,625. Males had a median income of $25,666 versus $15,542 for females. The per capita income for the village was $30,870.
