= Nutwood Site =

Archaeological site in Illinois, United States

- U.S. National Register of Historic Places
- Location within Illinois Location within the United States
- Location: Western side of Illinois Route 100, 500 feet (150 m) south of the Narrows Creek bridge
- Coordinates: 39°04′54″N 90°33′23″W
- Area: 10.5 acres (4.2 ha)
- NRHP reference No.: 79003784
- Added to NRHP: February 9, 1979

The Nutwood Site is a pre-Columbian archaeological site located on the western site of Illinois Route 100 immediately south of Narrows Creek near Nutwood, Illinois. The site dates from the Jersey Bluff phase of the Late Woodland period, which lasted from 750 to 1100 A.D. A large shell midden is located at the site; the shells were likely fished from Narrows Creek and nearby Otter Creek. Four firepits, which were identified by their concentrations of burnt limestone and igneous rock, have also been found at the site. In addition, the presence of Hopewell pottery fragments suggests that the site had connections to the earlier Hopewell culture.

The site was added to the National Register of Historic Places on February 9, 1979.
