= Schudel No. 2 Site =

Archaeological site in Illinois, United States

- U.S. National Register of Historic Places
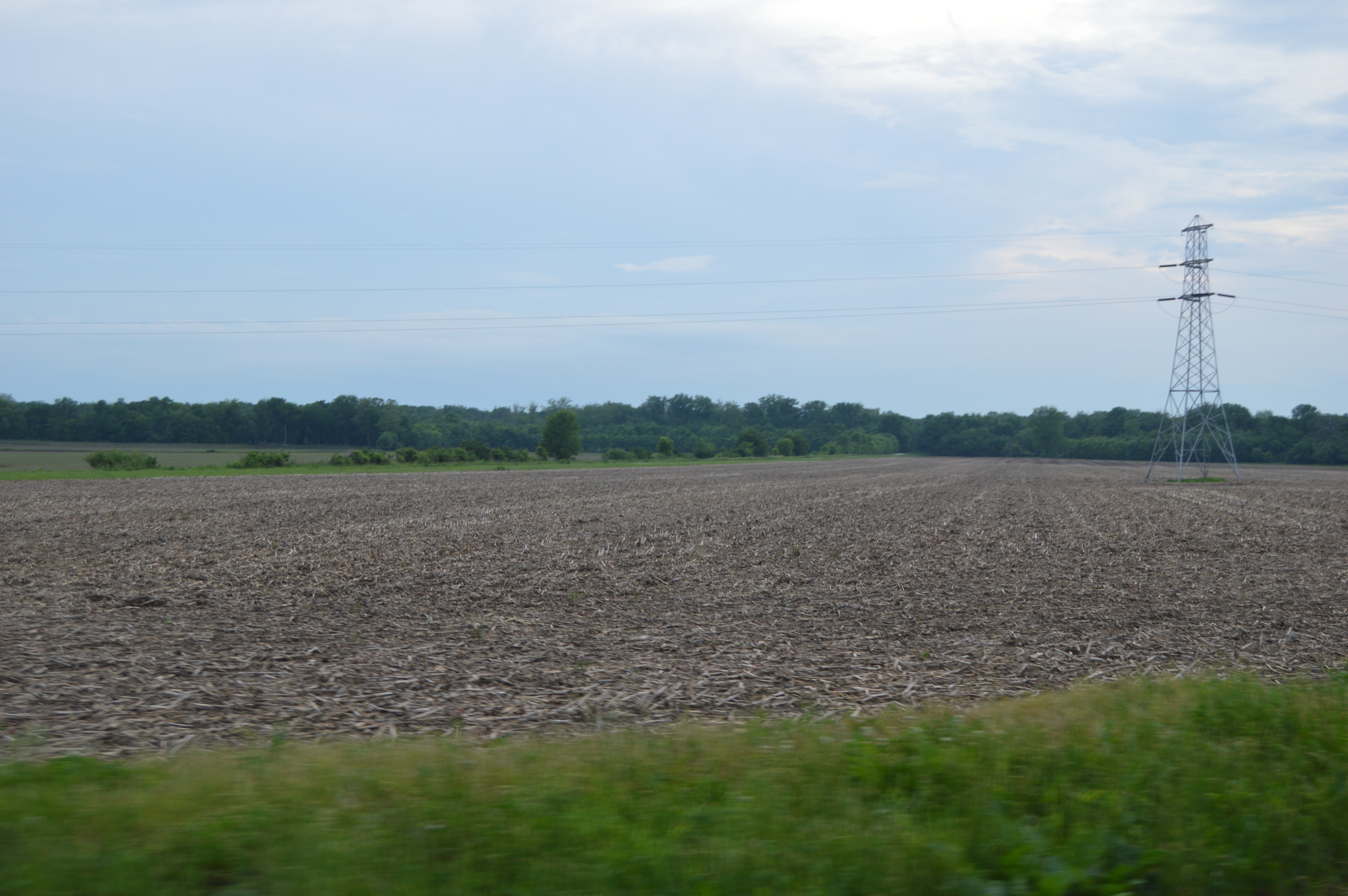

- Location within Illinois Location within the United States
- Location: 200N, west of Mississippi River Rd.
- Coordinates: 39°09′49″N 90°41′36″W
- Area: 5 acres (2.0 ha)
- NRHP reference No.: 79000817
- Added to NRHP: June 15, 1979

The Schudel No. 2 Site is a pre-Columbian archaeological site located southeast of Hamburg in Calhoun County, Illinois. The site mainly contains the remains of a Middle Woodland period habitation site, though some artifacts date from other periods. Materials recovered from the site include midden deposits, ceramics, chert fragments, and discarded tools. The site is also distinguished by its unusually dark soil, particularly in the areas at which artifacts have been found.

The site was added to the National Register of Historic Places on June 15, 1979
