= Golden Eagle-Toppmeyer Site =

Archaeological site in Illinois, United States

- U.S. National Register of Historic Places
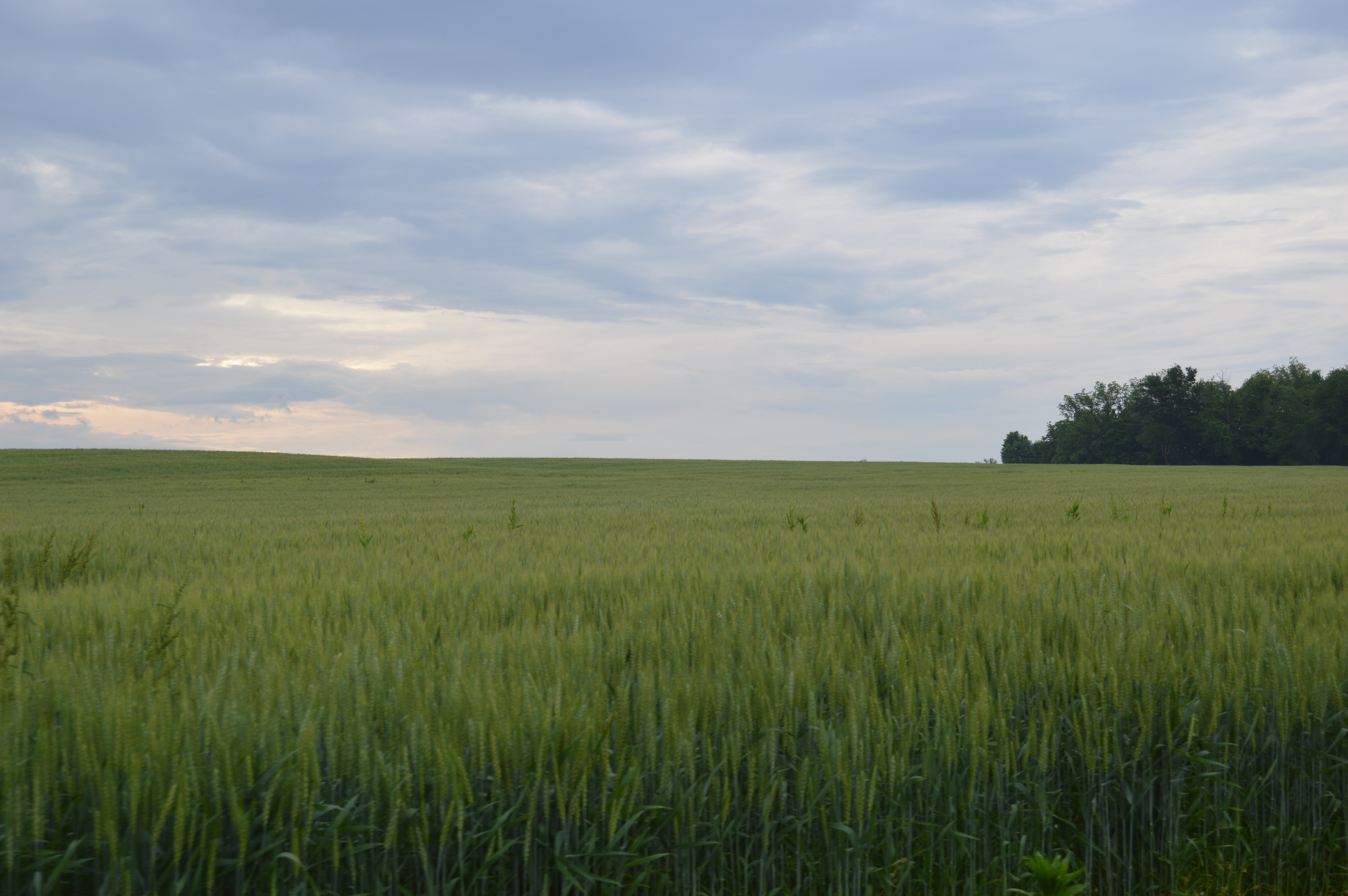

- Location within Illinois Location within the United States
- Location: Western side of Quarry Rd., south of Illinois River Rd.
- Coordinates: 38°54′55″N 90°31′13″W
- Area: 45 acres (18 ha)
- NRHP reference No.: 79000816
- Added to NRHP: June 14, 1979

The Golden Eagle-Toppmeyer Site is a pre-Columbian archaeological site located near the confluence of the Illinois and Mississippi Rivers in Calhoun County, Illinois. The site is associated with the Havana Hopewell culture and has two main components: the Golden Eagle earthwork and the Toppmeyer habitation site. The earthwork, which dates from the Middle Woodland period (150 BC - 450 AD), is the only geometric earthwork from the period in the central Mississippi River valley. Two mounds are incorporated in the rounded earthwork; one is located at the center, and one is located at a gap which has been called the "entrance" to the earthwork. The Toppmeyer habitation site, which overlaps the western edge of the earthwork, dates from the Late Woodland period (750 AD). The overall site was likely a regional transaction center at which extensive trade and cultural exchange among Hopewell people in the Illinois River valley took place.

The site was added to the National Register of Historic Places on June 14, 1979.
