= Calhoun High School (Illinois) =

Public school in Hardin, Illinois, US

Location
- 101 Calhoun Avenue; Hardin, Illinois 62047; United States; 39.1768°N 90.61405°W

Information
- Type: Public, Coeducational
- School district: Calhoun Community Unit School District 40
- Superintendent: Lori Young
- Principal: Cheri Burris
- Teaching staff: 15.00 (FTE)
- Grades: 9–12
- Enrollment: 171 (2024–25)
- Student to teacher ratio: 11.40
- Campus type: Rural
- Colors: Red and black
- Athletics conference: Western Illinois Valley Conference
- Nickname: Warriors
- Website: calhoun40.net

Calhoun High School is a public high school in Hardin, Illinois, that is part of the Calhoun Community Unit School District 40. Calhoun serves the communities of Hardin, Batchtown, Hamburg, Kampsville, Michael, and Mozier.

== History ==
Calhoun High School was formed out of the consolidation of Hardin High School and other schools.

== Athletics ==
The school has six state championships on record in team athletics and activities: football in 1992–1993 (1A) and 1993–1994 (1A), girls basketball in 2015–2016 (1A), girls softball in 2015 (1A) and 2016 (1A) and girls volleyball in 2024 (1A). They have also had three other state appearances: football state runner-up in 1986–1987, girls softball state fourth place in 2011, and girls basketball state runner-up in 2014–2015. Due to its small enrollment, Calhoun cooperates with nearby Brussels High School or Pleasant Hill High School for some athletics (Brussels for football, volleyball, basketball, softball and baseball. Pleasant Hill for track and field).
