= Great River National Wildlife Refuge =

Protected area in Illinois and Missouri, US

- IUCN category IV (habitat/species management area)
- Location within the United States Location within Missouri Location within Illinois
- Location: Adams County, Pike County, Illinois, Clark County, Lewis County, Missouri, United States
- Nearest city: Louisiana, Missouri
- Coordinates: 39.4397°N 90.9773°W
- Area: 11,600 acres (47 km^{2})
- Established: 1958
- Governing body: U.S. Fish and Wildlife Service
- Website: Great River National Wildlife Refuge

The Great River National Wildlife Refuge protects approximately 11,600 acres (47 km^{2}) along 120 miles (190 km) of the Mississippi River, stretching north of St. Louis, Missouri. Three separate units are located in the floodplain, on both the Illinois and Missouri sides of the river.

In 1998, the Great River Refuge was designated as a globally Important Bird Area, due to its value to shorebirds, songbirds, and waterfowl. The refuge's proximity to St. Louis provides excellent educational opportunities to a large population.

The Clarence Cannon National Wildlife Refuge is also under the administration of the Great River Refuge. Great River Refuge, in turn, was formerly part of the Mark Twain National Wildlife Refuge Complex, which also included: Port Louisa, Two Rivers, and Middle Mississippi River National Wildlife Refuges.

== History ==
Long Island Division, near Quincy, Illinois, was part of the original Mark Twain Refuge when it was established in 1958 under the Fish and Wildlife Coordination Act.

The division is General Plan Land owned by the U.S. Army Corps of Engineers and managed by the U.S. Fish and Wildlife Service under a cooperative agreement signed in 1963. In 1986, another cooperative agreement was signed with the Corps of Engineers adding the 1,450-acre (5.9 km^{2}) Bear Creek Unit to the division.

Funds from the sale of migratory waterfowl stamps were used to acquire fee title land in 1965 and 1976 for the 1,737-acre (7.03 km^{2}) Delair Division. The division lies completely within the 52-mile (84 km)-long Sny Agricultural Levee District and is separated from the river by the main-line Sny levee.

Fox Island Division is the most recent addition to Great River Refuge. Once again, fee title land was purchased with funds from the sale of migratory waterfowl stamps in 1989, 1996 and 1997. Purchases made in the 1990s were in response to the record flood in 1993, which created an opportunity to purchase many hard-hit floodplain areas at lower prices from willing sellers.

Great River Refuge also administers two fee title tracts that were formerly Farmer's Home Administration easements. These lands include the 38-acre (150,000 m^{2}) Winters tract in Lewis County and the 80-acre (320,000 m^{2}) Owens tract in Clark County in Missouri.

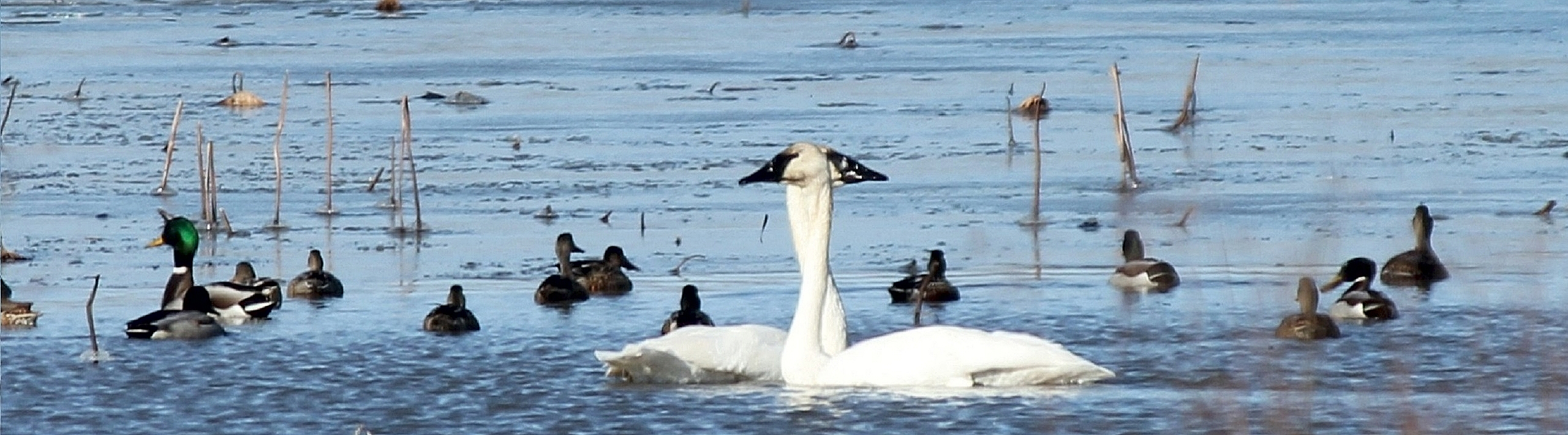
Swans and ducks at the Great River National Wildlife Refuge, March 2021
