= Brussels High School =

American high school in southern Illinois

Location
- 128 School Street; Brussels, Illinois 62013; United States; 38.94722°N 90.58795°W

Information
- Type: Public comprehensive high school
- School district: Brussels School District
- Principal: Pam Long
- Grades: 7–12
- Enrollment: 50 (2023–24)
- Colors: Blue and white
- Fight song: Victory March
- Athletics conference: Pike County Conference
- Mascot: Viking
- Nickname: Raiders
- Website: brussels42.net

Brussels High School is a public six-year combined junior and senior high school in Brussels, Illinois that is part of the Brussels School District. Brussels High School serves the communities of Brussels, Batchtown, Golden Eagle, and Meppen.

== Athletics ==
Brussels High School's athletic history began in 1938 during the late stages of the Great Depression, when President Franklin D. Roosevelt and the Works Progress Administration approved the construction of a stone gymnasium in Brussels, the first indoor facility built in the district that could hold athletic events. Local funding was secured through the passage of a $10,000 bond on May 6, 1939, and on September 18, 1939, adults, students and WPA workers took part in the cornerstone laying ceremonies. Construction was completed in 1940. The gym, affectionately known as "The Pit" as it is surrounded by earth on two sides and is located down a flight of steps from nearby St. Mary School, is still in use today.

Brussels' girls basketball program has won five regional titles since its inception in 1975, winning a one-class regional in 1978 and then Class A regionals in 1983, 1987, 1988 and 1990, all under Illinois Basketball Coaches Association Hall of Fame coach David Franke, who founded the program. Franke remained coach until 2008 and finished with 408 career wins.

Brussels' boys basketball program celebrated its first Class A regional title under coach Russ Ward in 1982 by beating Calhoun (53–42), Southwestern (55–54) and Carlinville (56–45) en route to the title at Southwestern. But the Raiders would see their season end at 20–7 in heartbreaking fashion. They fell 52–47 in overtime to Pittsfield in the sectional semifinals in a Central Illinois ice storm in Petersburg Porta.

The Raiders came right back in the 1982–83 season and bounced Southwestern (60–31) in the regional semifinals at North Greene before pushing aside the host Spartans 49–42 in the title game to earn the return trip to Porta. Brussels was able to gain revenge on Pittsfield in the semifinals, again in OT, but with the Raiders topping the Saukees 44–43. Brussels then downed Pawnee 58–49 to take the sectional and punch the Raiders' first-ever ticket to the Sweet Sixteen at Western Illinois University's Western Hall in Macomb.

Brussels' dream season came to an end at WIU against Havana's twin towers of Dave and Kevin King and all-state guard Trevor Trimpe. The Ducks came out on top 58–37. That 22–7 season marked the third-straight 20-win season for the Raiders, who were ranked No. 15 in the final Associated Press Class A basketball rankings.

Up until 2012, Brussels only offered two sports for girls: basketball in the winter and softball in the spring. It was during 2012 that Brussels added girls volleyball to its athletics offerings with a junior varsity schedule under coach Melissa Stephens. In 2013, the Raiders began competing with a varsity schedule. Just two years later in 2015, the Raiders found themselves in a regional title match; the result was a two-set defeat at the hands of county rival Calhoun in Hardin. The next year, after winning the regular season Pike County Conference title and the late-season PCC Tournament, the Raiders upset Raymond Lincolnwood in the semifinals, again at Calhoun High School, setting up a rematch with the host Warriors in the title match. But Calhoun beat Brussels once again, by a 25–12, 25–13 count.

Despite graduating all 10 varsity players, the Raiders set the tone for the 2017 volleyball season with a 25–13, 25–23 win over Calhoun in the season-opening Roxana Tournament. Brussels also notched big wins over Jersey Community High School and Orchard Farm High School during the regular season.

The Raiders were able to parlay a 21-win regular season and another conference title into the top seed at the Metro East Lutheran Class A Regional in Edwardsville. At Hooks Gym, the Raiders beat Mount Olive in the semifinals to earn their third-straight regional title match appearance, this time against the host Knights who played a predominately Class 2A and 3A schedule. After winning the first set 26–24, the Raiders watched Lutheran take the second set 25–14 and then a 17–8 lead in the deciding set. Looking at a possible third-straight regional title defeat, the Raiders battled back and upended the Knights 25–22 to secure the first regional title in the program's brief history.

The Raiders ended the season with a 23–13 mark after losing to Steeleville in the Christ Our Rock Lutheran Sectional in Centralia.

Due to its small enrollment and decreased student interest, Brussels discontinued its sports program and formed a co-op with Calhoun Unit 40. High school basketball, baseball, softball, and cheerleading were joined in the fall of 2021. High School volleyball and junior high basketball, baseball, softball, and volleyball where cooperated in the fall of 2022. Brussels has never had a football program, but participates in a previously formed co-op with host Calhoun. The sports co-op between Brussels and Calhoun ends years of stiff rivalry between the two school districts.

== School spirit ==
Brussels High School's athletic teams were originally nicknamed the Bluejays. But starting in 1967–68, the student body at BHS voted to change the nickname to the Raiders and currently their mascot is a viking. The logo is similar to that of the Minnesota Vikings of the National Football League, although without the colors purple and gold.

To go along with the mascot change, the school yearbook was named "Saga", which refers to stories told of ancient Nordic times. Previously the school yearbook was called the "Little Gem."

Brussels High's school song is the "Victory March," which is the fight song for the University of Notre Dame.

Each year, Brussels and Calhoun's boys basketball teams play the "Apple Crate Game," or simply referred to as the "Crate Game." The winner gets possession of a walnut apple crate traveling trophy, featuring gold plates that are etched with scores of past games in the series. The crate represents the many apple orchards that dot Calhoun County. The Raiders won the crate on December 15, 2017, by a 51–48 score.
