= Mozier =

Mozier may refer to:

- Joseph Mozier (1812–1870), American sculptor
- Mozier Landing, Illinois, an unincorporated community in Calhoun County, Illinois, US
- Mozier, Illinois, also known as Baytown, an unincorporated community in Calhoun County
