= Centerville, Calhoun County, Illinois =

Centerville, Illinois
- Unincorporated community
- Location within Illinois Location within the United States
- Coordinates: 38°55′49″N 90°34′18″W
- Country: United States
- State: Illinois
- County: Calhoun
- Elevation: 532 ft (162 m)
- Time zone: UTC-6 (Central (CST))
  - Summer (DST): UTC-5 (CDT)
- Area code: 618
- GNIS feature ID: 422535

Centerville is an unincorporated community in Calhoun County, Illinois, United States. Centerville is southeast of Brussels.
