= Beechville, Illinois =

- Unincorporated community
- Location within Illinois Location within the United States
- Coordinates: 38°58′17″N 90°38′51″W
- Country: United States
- State: Illinois
- County: Calhoun
- Elevation: 541 ft (165 m)
- Time zone: UTC-6 (Central (CST))
  - Summer (DST): UTC-5 (CDT)
- Area code: 618
- GNIS feature ID: 422449

Beechville is an unincorporated community in Calhoun County, Illinois, United States. Beechville is located 1 mile (1.6 km) east of the Mississippi River south of Batchtown.
