= Kritesville, Illinois =

- Unincorporated community
- Location within Illinois Location within the United States
- Coordinates: 39°05′57″N 90°39′51″W
- Country: United States
- State: Illinois
- County: Calhoun
- Elevation: 469 ft (143 m)
- Time zone: UTC-6 (Central (CST))
  - Summer (DST): UTC-5 (CDT)
- Area code: 618
- GNIS feature ID: 411622

Kritesville is an unincorporated community in Calhoun County, Illinois, United States. Kritesville is located near the Mississippi River north of Batchtown.
