= Brussels Historic District =

Historic district in Illinois, United States

- U.S. National Register of Historic Places
- U.S. Historic district
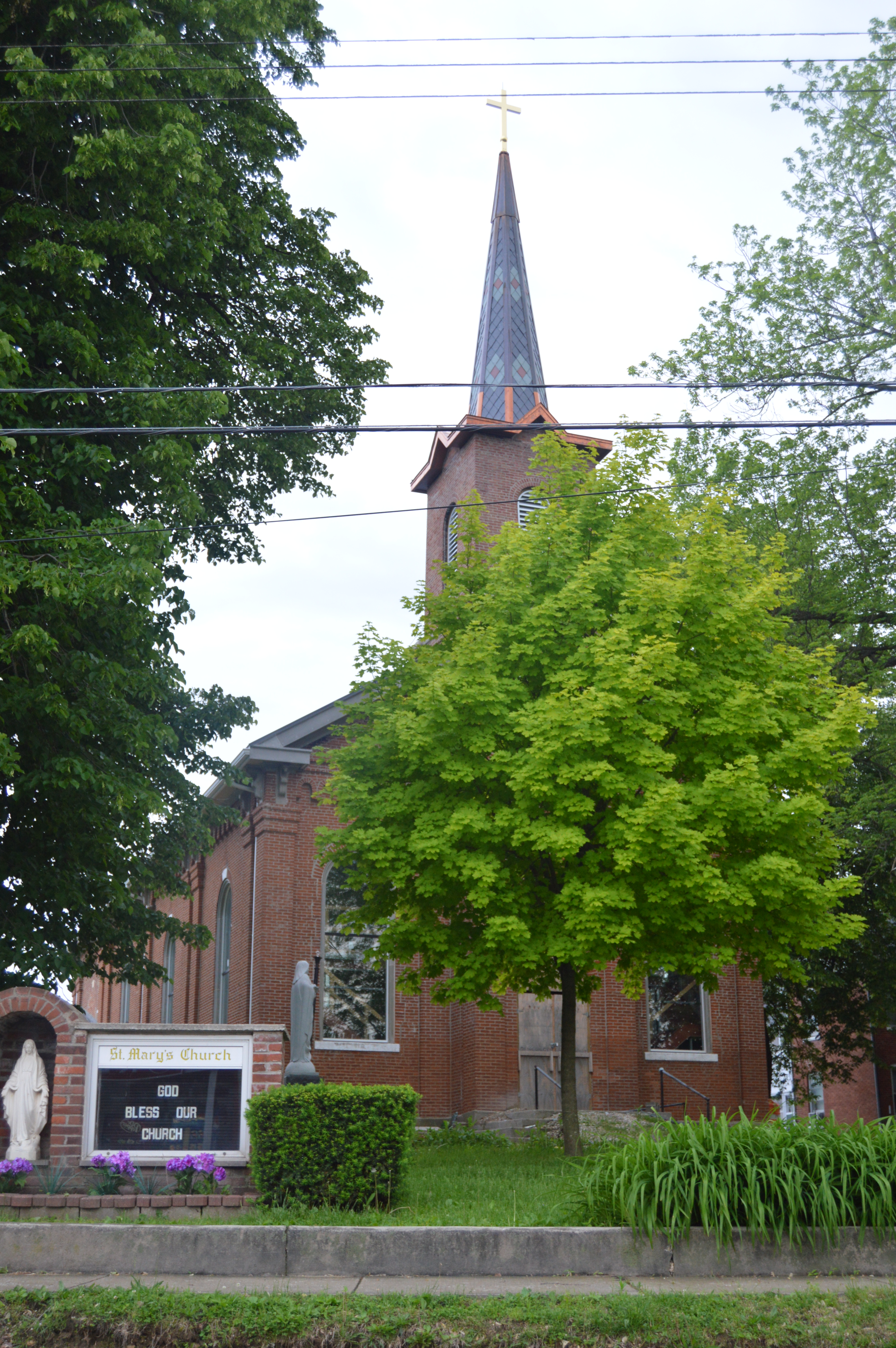
- St. Mary's Church

- Location within Illinois Location within the United States
- Location: Roughly along Main and Community Sts., Brussels, Illinois
- Coordinates: 38°56′59″N 90°35′13″W
- Area: 80 acres (32 ha)
- NRHP reference No.: 98000981
- Added to NRHP: August 6, 1998

The Brussels Historic District is a historic district which encompasses much of the village of Brussels, Illinois. The district includes the buildings on .7 miles (1.1 km) of Main Street and .1 miles (0.16 km) of Community Avenue, the village's two main streets. The Brussels area grew significantly in 1843 due to an influx of German immigrants, and development in the historic district began in 1847 with the construction of Wittmond's Trading Post. The village continued to develop into the 20th century while maintaining its identity as an agricultural community.

The district contains 80 contributing buildings. The 21 homes in the district are mainly one-story or one-and-a-half-story frame structures. Ten commercial buildings, some with attached houses, are part of the district. St. Mary's Church, an Italianate building from 1863, and its associated church office, parish hall, grade school, and cemetery are all within the district. Other buildings within the district include a library, a gymnasium, an American Legion hall, and several barns and outbuildings.

The district was added to the National Register of Historic Places on August 6, 1998.
