= Rockwood, Illinois =

Rockwood
- Village
- Location of Rockwood in Randolph County, Illinois.
- Coordinates: 37°50′19″N 89°41′49″W
- Country: United States
- State: Illinois
- County: Randolph

Area
  - Total: 0.21 sq mi (0.55 km^{2})
  - Land: 0.21 sq mi (0.55 km^{2})
  - Water: 0 sq mi (0.00 km^{2})
- Elevation: 410 ft (120 m)

Population (2020)
  - Total: 32
  - Density: 151.2/sq mi (58.37/km^{2})
- Time zone: UTC-6 (CST)
  - Summer (DST): UTC-5 (CDT)
- ZIP code: 62280
- Area code: 618
- FIPS code: 17-65221
- GNIS feature ID: 2399108

Rockwood is a village in Randolph County, Illinois, United States. The population was 32 at the 2020 census. It is the headquarters of the Middle Mississippi River National Wildlife Refuge.

== Geography ==
According to the 2010 census, Rockwood has a total area of 0.21 square miles (0.54 km^{2}), all land.

== Demographics ==
Historical population
Census	Pop.	Note	%±
1880	237		—
1900	169		—
1910	140		−17.2%
1920	153		9.3%
1930	171		11.8%
1940	246		43.9%
1950	175		−28.9%
1960	98		−44.0%
1970	59		−39.8%
1980	59		0.0%
1990	45		−23.7%
2000	41		−8.9%
2010	42		2.4%
2020	32		−23.8%
U.S. Decennial Census

As of the census of 2000, there were 41 people, 11 households, and 7 families residing in the village. The population density was 193.9 inhabitants per square mile (74.9/km^{2}). There were 13 housing units at an average density of 61.5 units per square mile (23.7 units/km^{2}). The racial makeup of the village was 100.00% White.

There were 11 households, out of which 27.3% had children under the age of 18 living with them, 54.5% were married couples living together, 18.2% had a female householder with no husband present, and 27.3% were non-families. 27.3% of all households were made up of individuals, and 9.1% had someone living alone who was 65 years of age or older. The average household size was 3.73 and the average family size was 4.50.

In the village, the population was spread out, with 36.6% under the age of 18, 4.9% from 18 to 24, 31.7% from 25 to 44, 19.5% from 45 to 64, and 7.3% who were 65 years of age or older. The median age was 32 years. For every 100 females, there were 95.2 males. For every 100 females age 18 and over, there were 116.7 males.

The median income for a household in the village was $61,250, and the median income for a family was $38,750. Males had a median income of $21,563 versus $23,750 for females. The per capita income for the village was $9,387. None of the population and none of the families were below the poverty line.
