= Koster Site =

Archaeological site in Illinois, United States

- U.S. National Register of Historic Places
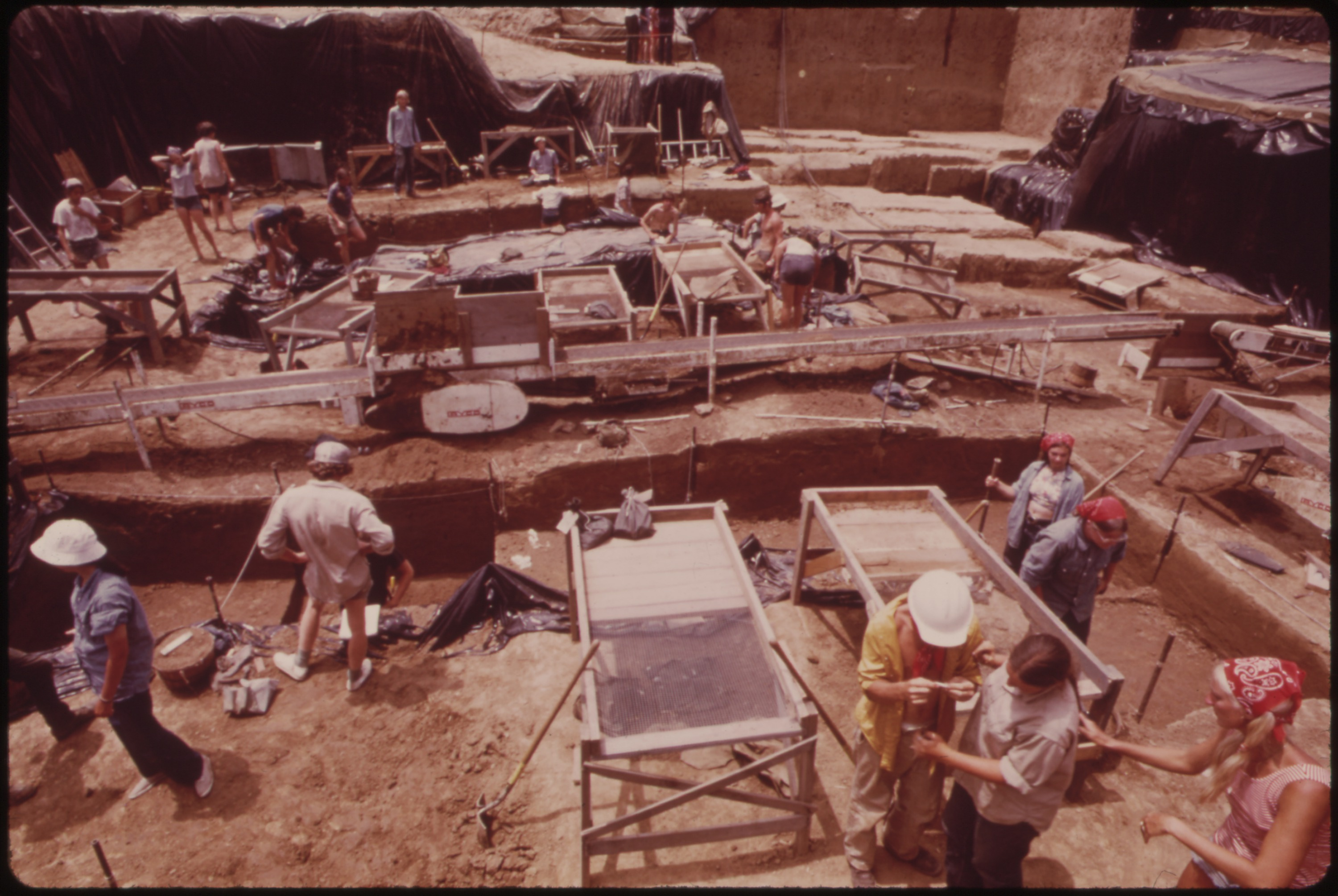
- College students and archaeologists at the Koster Site in 1973

- Location within Illinois Location within the United States
- Location: 200 yards (180 m) east of the Eldred-Hillview road, 5.5 miles (8.9 km) south of Eldred
- Nearest city: Eldred, Illinois
- Coordinates: 39°12′33″N 90°32′57″W
- Area: 25 acres (10 ha)
- NRHP reference No.: 72000460
- Added to NRHP: June 19, 1972

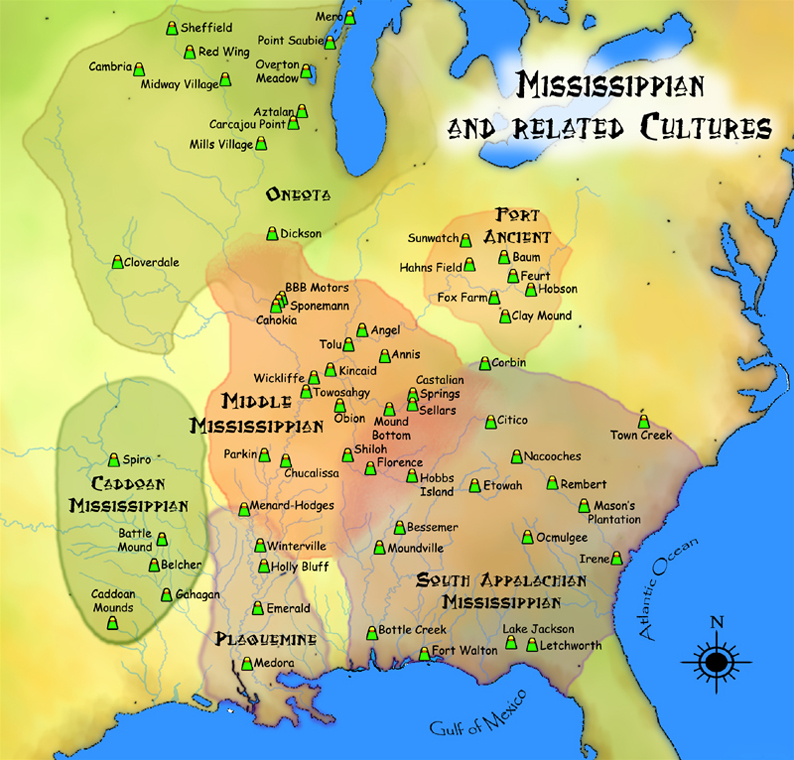
A map showing approximate areas of various Mississippian and related cultures. The Koster Site is located near the center of this map in the upper part of the Middle Mississippi area.

The Koster Site is a prehistoric archaeological site located south of Eldred, Illinois. The site covers more than 3 acres and extends 30 feet down into the alluvial deposits of the Illinois River valley. Over the course of its excavation between 1969 and 1978, Koster produced deeply buried evidence of ancient human occupation from the early Archaic period (BC 7500) to the Mississippian period (AD 1000). The soil strata contains a total of 25 distinct occupations each separated by additional layers of soil, making the site exceptionally well-preserved.

The site includes one of the oldest known cemetery sites in eastern North America. The cemetery site has provided researchers with evidence that Early Archaic civilizations had specific burial practices and buried their dead in mounds, often with numerous individuals buried together. Other significant discoveries made at the site include early evidence of North Americans using stones to grind food and keeping domesticated dogs. Three dog burials, and one burial 35 km away at the Stilwell II site in Pike County, date to 9,900 years ago and are the oldest dog remains discovered in the Americas.

The discovery of permanent residences and items which could not be easily transported at the site suggests that it was a large permanent village. Excavations at the site have also yielded a variety of stone tools, which were used for various purposes and also indicate long-term habitation of the site. Artifacts and evidence from the excavation helped archeologists revise their thinking about early inhabitants from nomads to a sedentary people living in year round structures.

The site was discovered in 1967 on the farm fields of Theodore and Mary Koster and subsequently named after them. The discovery was made by Northwestern University anthropologist Stuart Struever who stumbled on the farm and the rich trove of historically significant artifacts that lay beneath the cornfields after a tip from a local farmer. Struever had recently founded the Center for American Archeology located in Kampsville, Illinois. Under his leadership, the site became one of the largest excavations of its era, drawing over 10,000 yearly visitors; it is considered to be the Center for American Archeology's most important discovery. The site was added to the National Register of Historic Places on June 19, 1972.

== See also ==
- List of archaeological sites on the National Register of Historic Places in Illinois
