= Marshall Landing, Illinois =

- Unincorporated community
- Location within Illinois Location within the United States
- Coordinates: 38°57′27″N 90°30′21″W
- Country: United States
- State: Illinois
- County: Calhoun
- Elevation: 417 ft (127 m)
- Time zone: UTC-6 (Central (CST))
  - Summer (DST): UTC-5 (CDT)
- Area code: 618
- GNIS feature ID: 422944

Marshall Landing is an unincorporated community in Calhoun County, Illinois, United States. Marshall Landing is located along the Illinois River near its confluence with the Mississippi River in far southeastern Calhoun County.
