= Clarence Cannon National Wildlife Refuge =

National Wildlife Refuge in Missouri, US

- IUCN category IV (habitat/species management area)
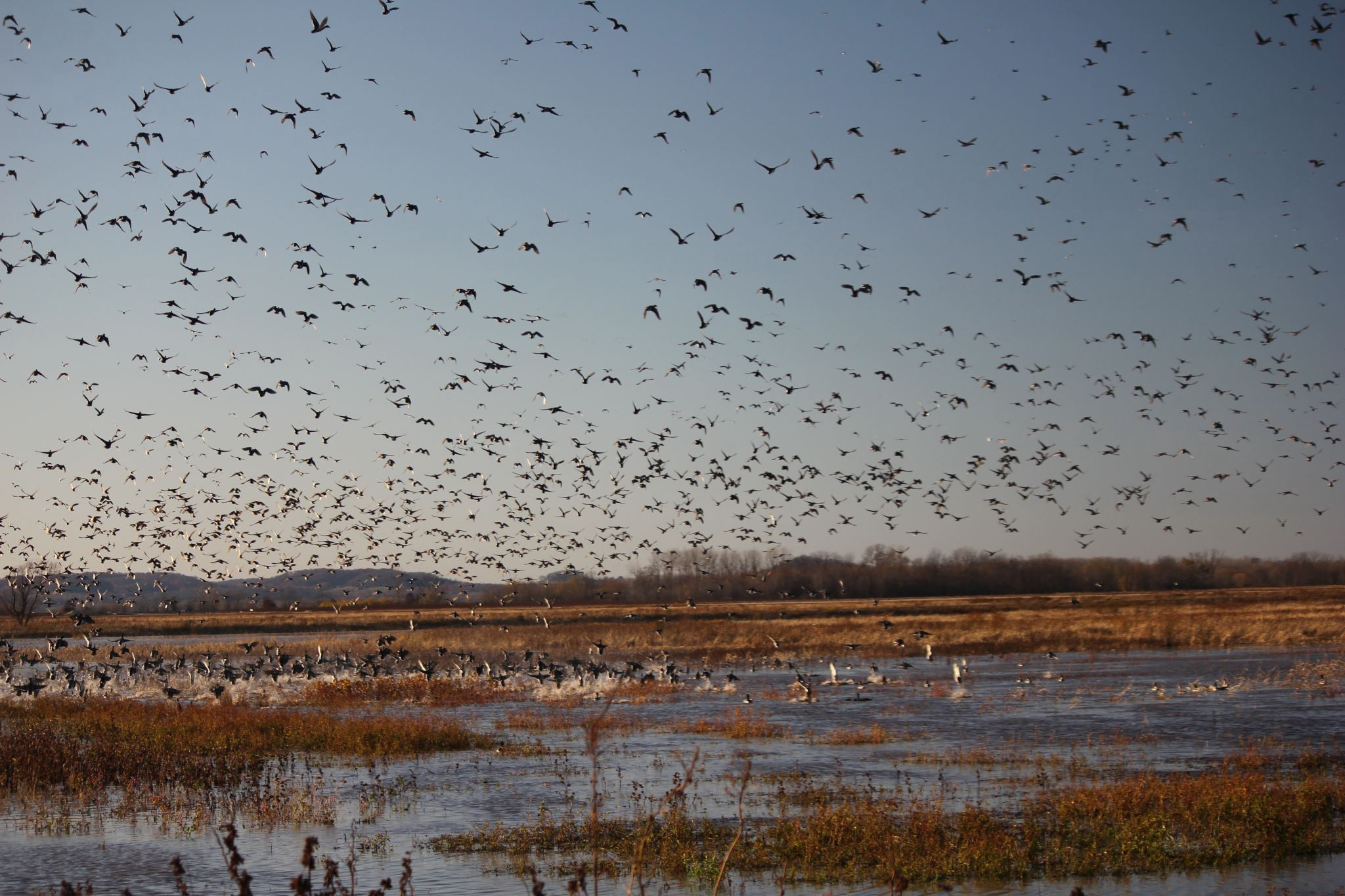
- Fall migration, Clarence Cannon National Wildlife Refuge, November 2011

- Location within the United States Location within Missouri
- Location: Pike County, Missouri, United States
- Nearest city: Annada, Missouri
- Coordinates: 39.267°N 90.784°W
- Area: 3,750 acres (15.2 km^{2})
- Established: 1964
- Governing body: U.S. Fish and Wildlife Service
- Website: Clarence Cannon National Wildlife Refuge

The 3,750-acre (15.2 km^{2}) Clarence Cannon National Wildlife Refuge is located in the floodplain of the Mississippi River, adjacent to Pool No. 25 in Pike County, Missouri. The refuge's diversity of habitats supports waterfowl, wading birds, shorebirds, and songbirds. Although it is protected by a levee, the refuge provides flood storage in periods of high water.

Clarence Cannon Refuge is managed by Great River National Wildlife Refuge, which is part of the Mark Twain National Wildlife Refuge Complex.

== See also ==
- Clarence Cannon
