= Kamp Store =

- U.S. National Register of Historic Places
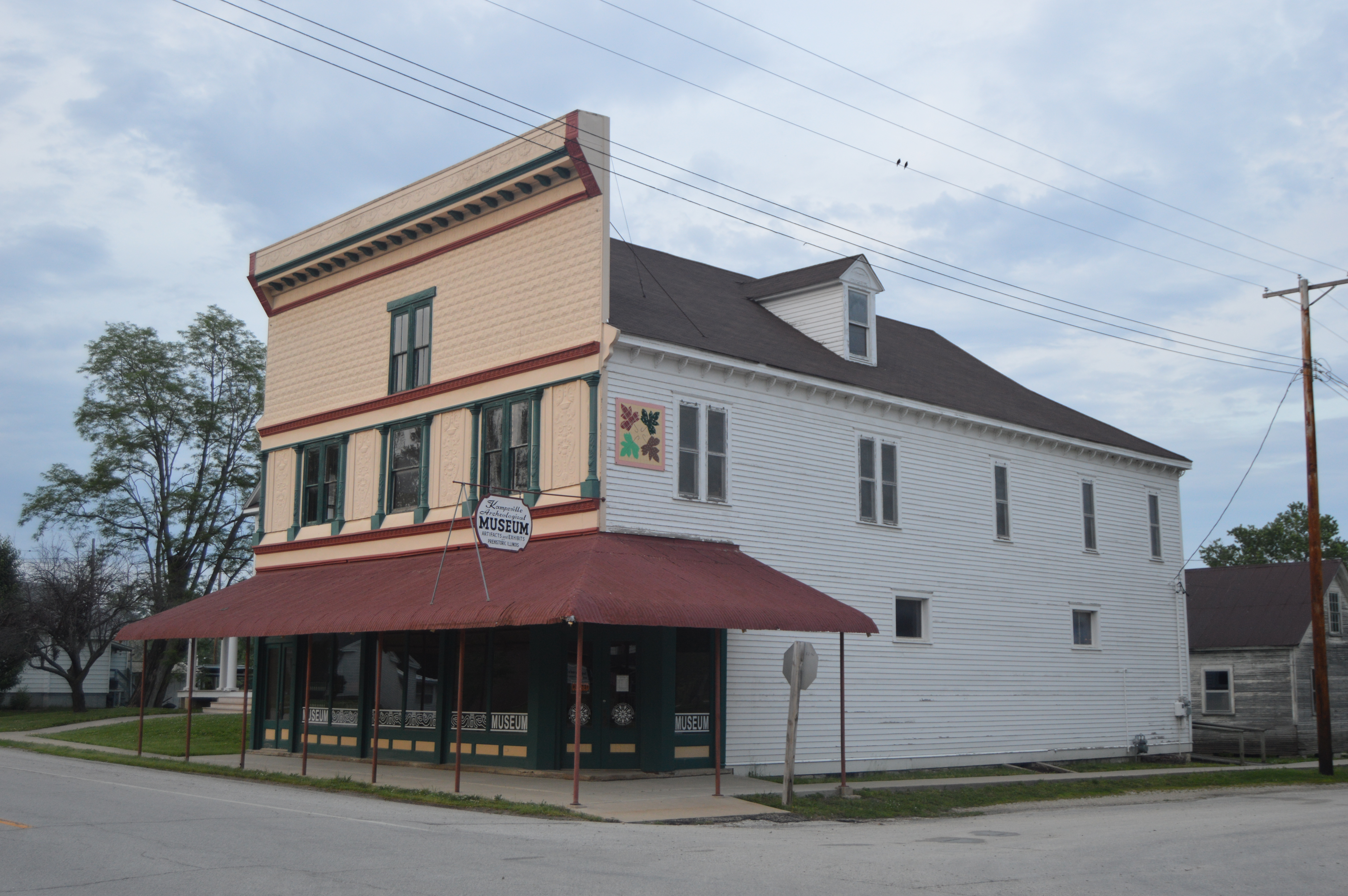
- Front and southern side

- Location within Illinois Location within the United States
- Location: Northeastern corner of the junction of Oak and Broadway, Kampsville, Illinois
- Coordinates: 39°17′54″N 90°36′37″W
- Area: less than one acre
- Built: 1902
- Architectural style: Early Commercial
- NRHP reference No.: 94000027
- Added to NRHP: February 4, 1994

The Kamp Store is a historic general store building located at the northeast corner of Oak and Broadway in Kampsville, Illinois, United States. Joseph Kamp, the son of the founder of Kampsville, opened the store in 1902. The two-story wood-frame building features a false front with decorative metalwork. The store provided Kampsville residents with a wide variety of goods, ranging from small household items to automobiles and heavy farming equipment. St. Louis-based suppliers shipped the store its goods via Mississippi River barges. Kamp operated the store until his death in 1952; the store served as a grocery store until the 1970s and later became a carpet store. The Center for American Archeology purchased the building in 1991 and now uses it as its Visitor Center and Museum.

The building was added to the National Register of Historic Places on February 4, 1994.
