= Brussels, Illinois =

- Village
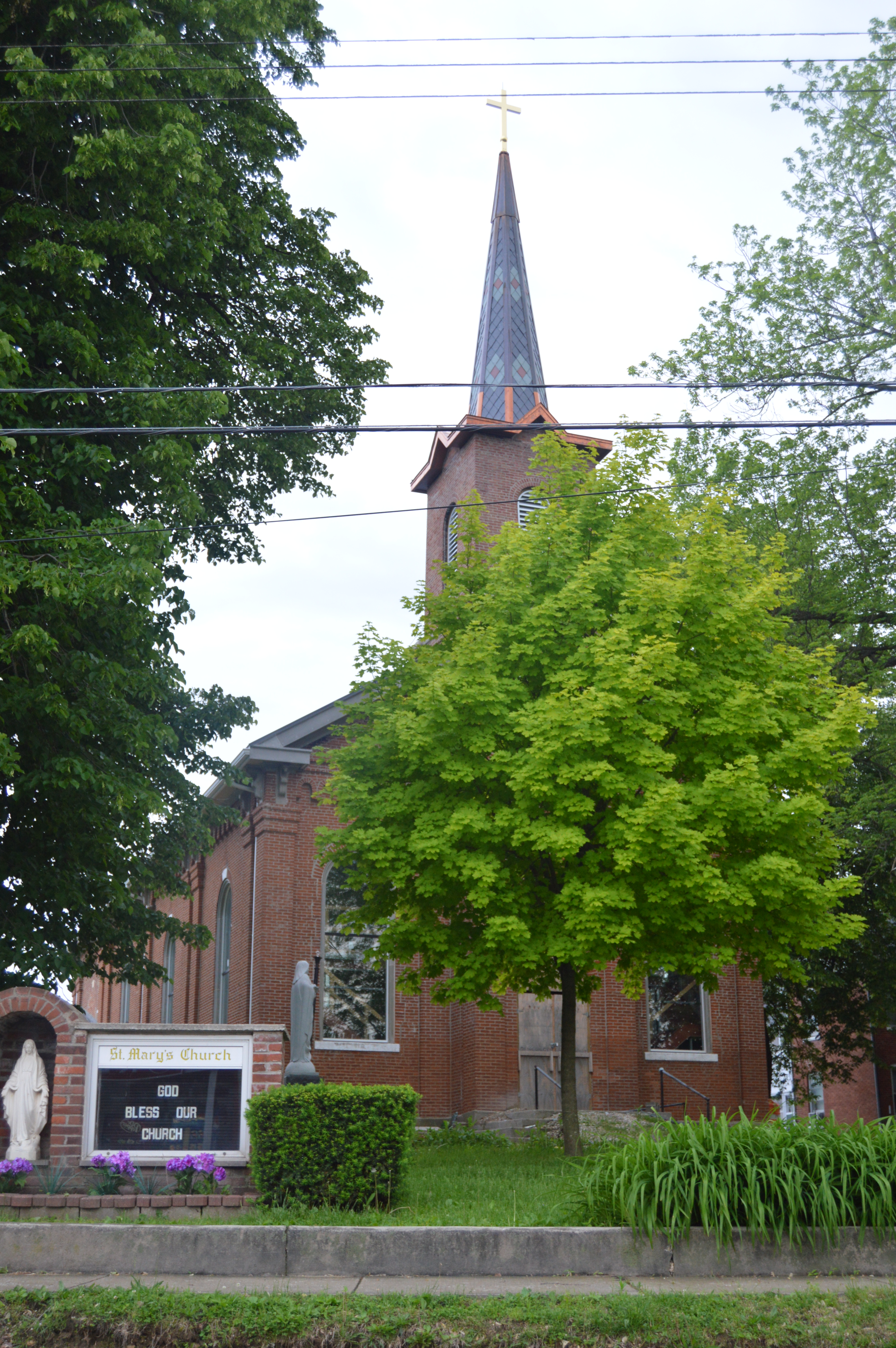
- St. Mary's Catholic Church, May 2014

- Location of Brussels in Calhoun County, Illinois.
- Coordinates: 38°56′54″N 90°35′21″W
- Country: United States
- State: Illinois
- County: Calhoun
- Precinct: Point

Area
  - Total: 0.558 sq mi (1.45 km^{2})
  - Land: 0.558 sq mi (1.45 km^{2})
  - Water: 0.00 sq mi (0 km^{2})
- Elevation: 518 ft (158 m)

Population (2020)
  - Total: 116
  - Density: 208/sq mi (80.3/km^{2})
- Time zone: UTC-6 (CST)
  - Summer (DST): UTC-5 (CDT)
- ZIP code: 62013
- Area codes: 618/730
- FIPS code: 17-09148
- GNIS feature ID: 2397479

Brussels is a village in Point Precinct, Calhoun County, Illinois, United States. The population was 116 at the 2020 census.

Brussels is the headquarters location of the Two Rivers National Wildlife Refuge, which is noted for its population of bald eagles. The refuge is named after the two great rivers that flow together close to Brussels, the Illinois River and the Mississippi River.

== History ==
Brussels was first settled in 1822, when John Mettz came to the area; later in the same year, Joshua Twitchell established the community's first business, a blacksmith shop. In 1843, Brussels' population grew significantly due to an influx of German immigrants. German immigration continued through the 1860s, and Irish immigrants also began settling in Brussels in the 1850s. The Wittmond Trading Post, one of the first brick stores in the region, opened in Brussels in 1847, marking the beginning of the village's commercial development. St. Mary's Church formed in 1848 to serve the community's Catholic residents; its current church building was constructed in 1863. In the early 1860s, St. Matthew's Church formed for Brussels' German Lutheran population. Brussels opened its own post office in 1875 and built its own jail in 1876. In 1888, Brussels was legally incorporated as a village.

The main street of the village is a historic district listed on the National Register of Historic Places.

== Geography ==
According to the 2021 census gazetteer files, Brussels has a total area of 0.56 square miles (1.45 km^{2}), all land.

== Demographics ==
Historical population
Census	Pop.	Note	%±
1890	228		—
1900	270		18.4%
1910	283		4.8%
1920	280		−1.1%
1930	279		−0.4%
1940	275		−1.4%
1950	205		−25.5%
1960	201		−2.0%
1970	191		−5.0%
1980	168		−12.0%
1990	125		−25.6%
2000	141		12.8%
2010	141		0.0%
2020	116		−17.7%
U.S. Decennial Census

As of the 2020 census there were 116 people, 36 households, and 17 families residing in the village. The population density was 207.89 inhabitants per square mile (80.27/km^{2}). There were 55 housing units at an average density of 98.57 per square mile (38.06/km^{2}). The racial makeup of the village was 93.97% White, 0.86% African American, 1.72% from other races, and 3.45% from two or more races. Hispanic or Latino of any race were 1.72% of the population.

There were 36 households, out of which 11.1% had children under the age of 18 living with them, 44.44% were married couples living together, 2.78% had a female householder with no husband present, and 52.78% were non-families. 52.78% of all households were made up of individuals, and 19.44% had someone living alone who was 65 years of age or older. The average household size was 4.47 and the average family size was 2.64.

The village's age distribution consisted of 9.7% under the age of 18, 6.2% from 18 to 24, 30.1% from 25 to 44, 34.5% from 45 to 64, and 19.5% who were 65 years of age or older. The median age was 48.5 years. For every 100 females, there were 63.8 males. For every 100 females age 18 and over, there were 56.9 males.

Males had a median income of $39,583 versus $19,844 for females. The per capita income for the village was $25,463. No families and 27.4% of the population were below the poverty line, including none of those under age 18 and 36.4% of those age 65 or over.

== Education ==
Brussels has one school district, No. 42, which consists of one grade school (Brussels Grade School) and one high school (Brussels High School). The school district serves the surrounding communities of Meppen, Golden Eagle, and parts of Batchtown. In addition to the public school system, Brussels has a parochial grade school, St. Marys.

The school district is Brussels Community Unit School District 42.

== See also ==
- List of municipalities in Illinois
