= Winneberger, Illinois =

Winneberg, Illinois
- Unincorporated community
- Location within Illinois Location within the United States
- Coordinates: 38°52′47″N 90°35′07″W
- Country: United States
- State: Illinois
- County: Calhoun
- Elevation: 659 ft (201 m)
- Time zone: UTC-6 (Central (CST))
  - Summer (DST): UTC-5 (CDT)
- Area code: 618
- GNIS feature ID: 423324

Winneberg is an unincorporated community in Calhoun County, Illinois, United States. Winneberg is located on the Mississippi River at the southern tip of Calhoun County. The area of Winneburg was once a thriving town with a school, many houses, and a quarry until the early 1900s. When the quarry closed, many of the residents left and the town fell into ruin. In the early 2000s a developer bought the land where the town once stood and developed it into a subdivision with the same name of the previous town.
