= Mark Twain National Wildlife Refuge Complex =

United States Wildlife Refuge Complex

Coordinates: 40°0′N 91°20′W

The Mark Twain National Wildlife Refuge Complex was established for the protection of migratory birds including waterfowl, shorebirds, and songbirds. It is located along the Mississippi Flyway, one of the major routes for migrating waterfowl. Refuge units also provide important habitat for big-river fish and a variety of other native wildlife such as deer, fox, beaver, frogs, turtles, and snakes. Key goals are to conserve and enhance the quality and diversity of fish and wildlife and their habitats, to restore floodplain functions in the river corridor, and to provide wildlife-related recreational experiences for the public.

Several units within the Complex were established in the 1940s following construction of the lock and dam system. Those units were consolidated into Mark Twain National Wildlife Refuge in 1958. Since then, other areas have been added to Mark Twain, which now includes 45,000 acres (180 km^{2}) scattered along 345 miles (555 km) of the Mississippi River and short distances up the Illinois and Iowa rivers.

In 2000, Mark Twain National Wildlife Refuge was split into five separate National Wildlife Refuges - Port Louisa National Wildlife Refuge, Great River National Wildlife Refuge, Clarence Cannon National Wildlife Refuge, Two Rivers National Wildlife Refuge, and Middle Mississippi River National Wildlife Refuge. The Refuge Complex administration office, located in Quincy, Illinois, has retained the Mark Twain name.

The United States Fish and Wildlife Service is an agency of the Department of the Interior.
