= Star City, Illinois =

- Unincorporated community
- Location within Illinois Location within the United States
- Coordinates: 39°08′03″N 90°40′25″W
- Country: United States
- State: Illinois
- County: Calhoun
- Elevation: 456 ft (139 m)
- Time zone: UTC-6 (Central (CST))
  - Summer (DST): UTC-5 (CDT)
- Area code: 618
- GNIS feature ID: 423202

Star City is an unincorporated community in Calhoun County, Illinois. Star City is 7.5 miles (12.1 km) south of Hamburg.
