= Point Precinct, Calhoun County, Illinois =

Point Precinct
- Township
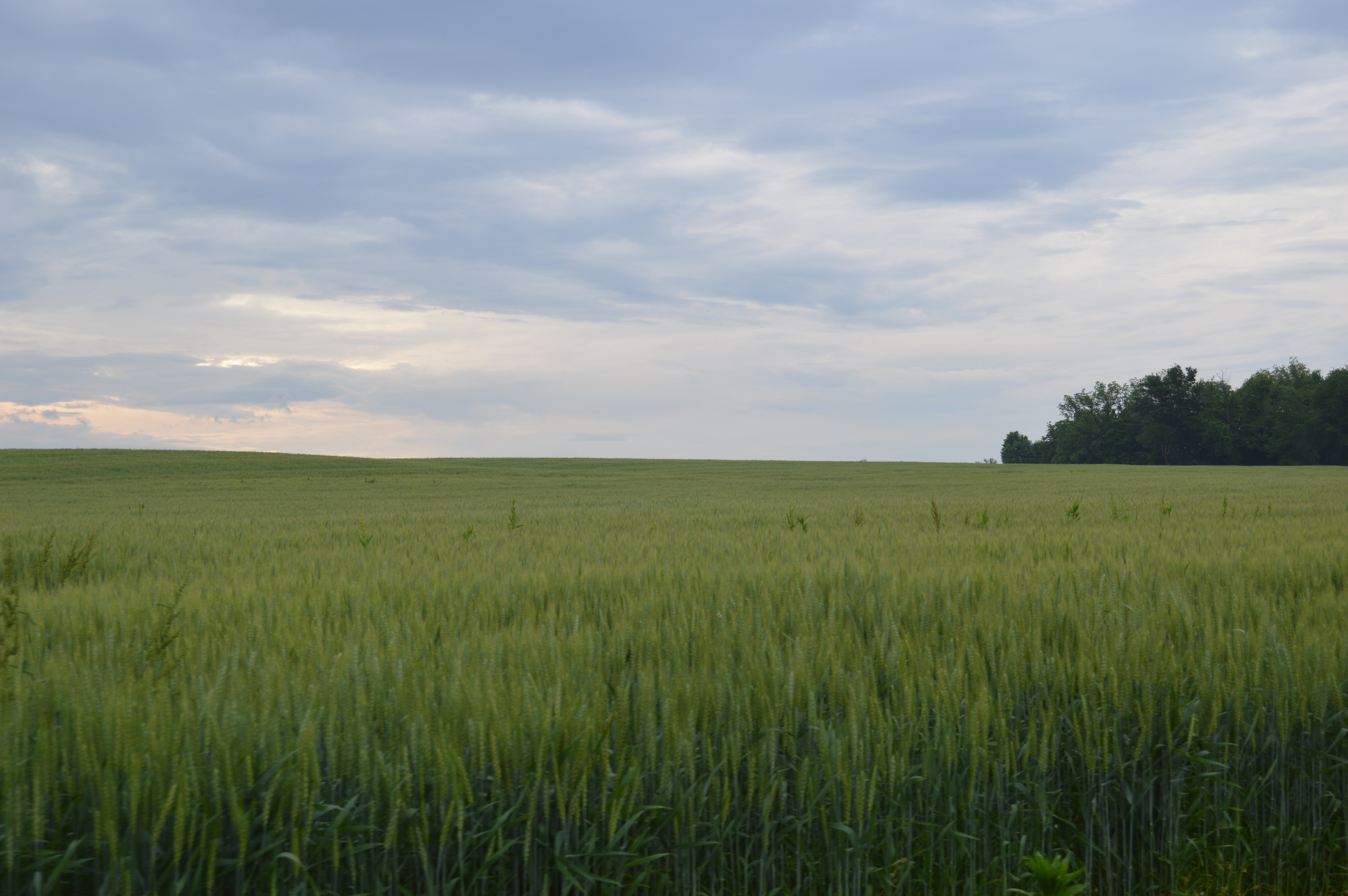
- Fields off Quarry Road, the Golden Eagle-Toppmeyer Site

- Location in Calhoun County
- Coordinates: 38°55′55″N 090°34′37″W
- Country: United States
- State: Illinois
- County: Calhoun

Area
  - Total: 55.18 sq mi (142.9 km^{2})
  - Land: 46.42 sq mi (120.2 km^{2})
  - Water: 8.76 sq mi (22.7 km^{2})
- Elevation: 512 ft (156 m)

Population (2020)
  - Total: 900
  - Density: 19/sq mi (7.5/km^{2})
- FIPS code: 17-013-92502
- GNIS feature ID: 1928602

Point Precinct is located in Calhoun County, Illinois. The population was 900 at the 2020 census, a decrease from 1,066 at the 2010 census.

== Geography ==
According to the 2021 census gazetteer files, Point Precinct has a total area of 55.18 square miles (142.92 km^{2}), of which 46.42 square miles (120.23 km^{2}) (or 84.12%) is land and 8.76 square miles (22.69 km^{2}) (or 15.88%) is water.

== Demographics ==
Historical population
Census	Pop.	Note	%±
2000	1,017		—
2010	1,066		4.8%
2020	900		−15.6%

As of the 2020 census there were 900 people, 394 households, and 221 families residing in the precinct. The population density was 16.31 inhabitants per square mile (6.30/km^{2}). There were 448 housing units at an average density of 8.12 per square mile (3.14/km^{2}). The racial makeup of the precinct was 95.22% White, 0.44% African American, 0.00% Native American, 0.00% Asian, 0.00% Pacific Islander, 0.67% from other races, and 3.67% from two or more races. Hispanic or Latino of any race were 1.78% of the population.

There were 394 households, out of which 7.60% had children under the age of 18 living with them, 50.00% were married couples living together, 2.54% had a female householder with no spouse present, and 43.91% were non-families. 41.10% of all households were made up of individuals, and 22.30% had someone living alone who was 65 years of age or older. The average household size was 2.29 and the average family size was 3.17.

The precinct's age distribution consisted of 7.7% under the age of 18, 11.2% from 18 to 24, 8.8% from 25 to 44, 33.9% from 45 to 64, and 38.3% who were 65 years of age or older. The median age was 58.7 years. For every 100 females, there were 98.5 males. For every 100 females age 18 and over, there were 99.5 males.

The median income for a household in the precinct was $57,500, and the median income for a family was $102,621. Males had a median income of $45,750 versus $27,813 for females. The per capita income for the precinct was $36,852. About 8.1% of families and 10.4% of the population were below the poverty line, including 20.6% of those under age 18 and 6.5% of those age 65 or over.
