= Mozier, Illinois =

- Unincorporated community
- Location within Illinois Location within the United States
- Coordinates: 39°17′33″N 90°44′57″W
- Country: United States
- State: Illinois
- County: Calhoun
- Elevation: 446 ft (136 m)
- Time zone: UTC-6 (Central (CST))
  - Summer (DST): UTC-5 (CDT)
- ZIP Code: 62070
- Area code: 618
- GNIS feature ID: 414158

Mozier, originally between Baytown and Hamburg, had its post office moved to Mozier. Now Mozier is also known as Baytown, is an unincorporated community in Hamburg Precinct, Calhoun County, Illinois, United States. The community is located along Illinois Route 96 7.5 miles (12.1 km) west of Kampsville. Mozier had a post office until September 7, 2011; it still has its own ZIP Code, 62070.
