= Middle Mississippi River National Wildlife Refuge =

Wildlife park in Missouri

- IUCN category IV (habitat/species management area)
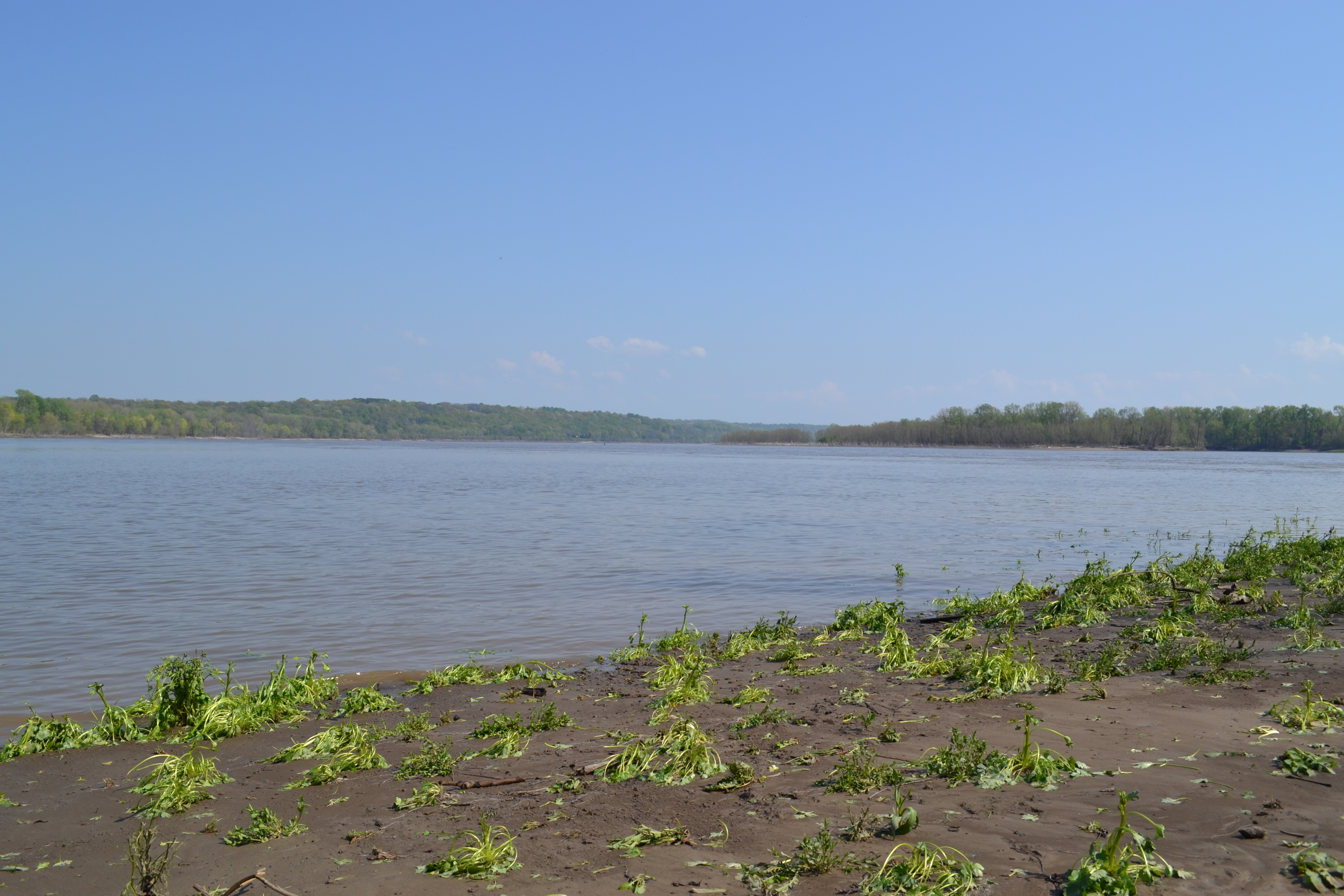

- Location within the United States Location within Missouri Location within Illinois
- Location: Jackson County, Monroe County, Randolph County, Illinois, Jefferson County, Perry County, Missouri, United States
- Coordinates: 37°55′00″N 89°55′00″W
- Area: 7,000 acres (28 km^{2})
- Established: 2000
- Governing body: U.S. Fish and Wildlife Service
- Website: Middle Mississippi River National Wildlife Refuge

The Middle Mississippi River National Wildlife Refuge is located on the Mississippi River downstream from St. Louis, Missouri. It is managed by the U.S. Fish and Wildlife Service as part of the Mark Twain National Wildlife Refuge Complex.

The refuge consists of three parcels of Mississippi River bottomland, nearly all of it wetland. They are Meissner Island, near Valmeyer, Illinois; Harlow Island, near Festus, Missouri; and Wilkinson Island, near Gorham, Illinois.

The Middle Mississippi River National Wildlife Refuge has a local headquarters at Rockwood, Illinois, in Randolph County. In all, the refuge is located in parts of Jackson, Monroe, and Randolph counties in Illinois, and Jefferson and Perry counties in Missouri. The refuge relies for much of its staffing on the nearby Crab Orchard National Wildlife Refuge near Carbondale, Illinois.

This Refuge was created in response to the Great Flood of 1993. The three parcels of bottomland that make up this Refuge had been riverine polders, agricultural land protected by dikes. After the dikes were breached by this flood, the damaged land parcels were transferred to the federal government. The Fish and Wildlife Service has announced plans to slowly return these three parcels to the status of semi-natural bottomlands. Pursuant to these plans, the Middle Mississippi River National Wildlife Refuge was established in May 2000.
