= Center for American Archeology =

Independent research and education institution

The Center for American Archeology, or CAA, is an independent non-profit 501(c)(3) research and education institution located in Kampsville, Illinois, USA, near the Illinois River. It is dedicated to the exploration of the culture of prehistoric Native Americans and, to a lesser extent, the European settlers who supplanted them.

Founded on what is often referred to as the "Nile of North America," the region surrounding the confluence of the Mississippi and the Illinois rivers, the Center for American Archeology specializes in North American pre-Columbian cultures of the area. Due to successive settlement along the rivers, the area is particularly rich in Woodland Period artifacts, especially those of the Middle Woodland Hopewell culture, and later Mississippian culture. The Center has been associated with years of excavation at the Koster Site in Greene County, Illinois. Researchers have uncovered evidence of more than 7,000 years of human habitation, back to the Early Archaic period (8000 BC to 1000 BC).

The center is located about 90 minutes north of St. Louis and the Cahokia Mounds near Collinsville, Illinois. It uses the Kamp Store as the site of the CAA's Visitor’s Center and Museum. The early 1900s mercantile building is listed on the National Register of Historic Places.

== Bibliography ==
- Koster: Americans in Search of Their Prehistoric Past by Stuart Struever and Felicia Antonelli Holton ISBN 1577661672
