= Richwood Precinct, Calhoun County, Illinois =

Richwood Precinct
- Township
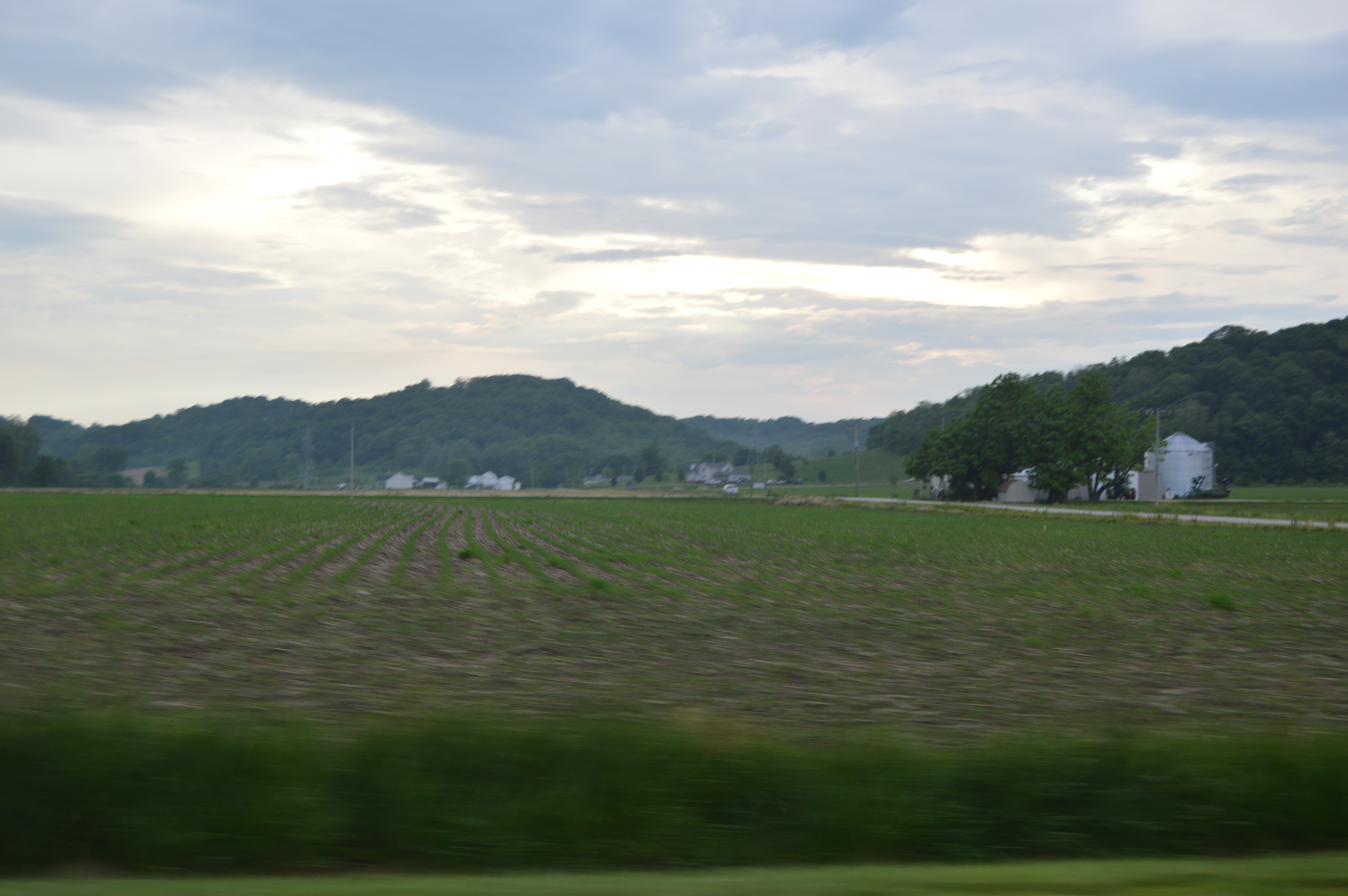
- Fields along Illinois River Road east of Batchtown

- Location in Calhoun County
- Coordinates
- Country: United States
- State: Illinois
- County: Calhoun

Area
  - Total: 42.05 sq mi (108.9 km^{2})
  - Land: 35.55 sq mi (92.1 km^{2})
  - Water: 6.5 sq mi (17 km^{2})
- Elevation: 656 ft (200 m)

Population (2020)
  - Total: 778
  - Density: 21.9/sq mi (8.45/km^{2})
- FIPS code: 17-013-92988
- GNIS feature ID: 1928633

Richwood Precinct is located in Calhoun County, Illinois. The population was 844 at the 2010 census, an increase from 820 in 2000.

== Geography ==
According to the 2021 census gazetteer files, Richwood Precinct has a total area of 42.05 square miles (108.91 km^{2}), of which 35.55 square miles (92.07 km^{2}) (or 84.55%) is land and 6.50 square miles (16.83 km^{2}) (or 15.45%) is water.

== Demographics ==
Historical population
| Census | Pop. | Note | %± |
|---|---|---|---|
| 2000 | 820 | | — |
| 2010 | 844 | | 2.9% |
| 2020 | 778 | | −7.8% |

As of the 2020 census there were 778 people, 346 households, and 297 families residing in the precinct. The population density was 18.50 inhabitants per square mile (7.14/km^{2}). There were 360 housing units at an average density of 8.56 per square mile (3.31/km^{2}). The racial makeup of the precinct was 97.17% White, 0.00% African American, 0.00% Native American, 0.13% Asian, 0.00% Pacific Islander, 0.00% from other races, and 2.70% from two or more races. Hispanic or Latino of any race were 1.16% of the population.

There were 346 households, out of which 37.90% had children under the age of 18 living with them, 75.14% were married couples living together, 10.69% had a female householder with no spouse present, and 14.16% were non-families. 13.60% of all households were made up of individuals, and 9.80% had someone living alone who was 65 years of age or older. The average household size was 3.14 and the average family size was 3.42.

The precinct's age distribution consisted of 26.3% under the age of 18, 3.0% from 18 to 24, 25.3% from 25 to 44, 27.3% from 45 to 64, and 18.0% who were 65 years of age or older. The median age was 43.4 years. For every 100 females, there were 118.5 males. For every 100 females age 18 and over, there were 117.4 males.

The median income for a household in the precinct was $77,750, and the median income for a family was $91,375. Males had a median income of $37,417 versus $39,821 for females. The per capita income for the precinct was $31,114. About 0.0% of families and 1.0% of the population were below the poverty line, including 0.0% of those under age 18 and 4.1% of those age 65 or over.
