= Golden Eagle, Illinois =

- Unincorporated community
- Location within Illinois Location within the United States
- Coordinates: 38°53′36″N 90°34′44″W
- Country: United States
- State: Illinois
- County: Calhoun
- Elevation: 673 ft (205 m)
- Time zone: UTC-6 (Central (CST))
  - Summer (DST): UTC-5 (CDT)
- ZIP Code: 62036
- Area code: 618
- GNIS feature ID: 422745

Golden Eagle is an unincorporated community in Calhoun County, Illinois, United States. The community is in southern Calhoun County 5 miles (8.0 km) south of Brussels, at the southernmost tip of the Calhoun County peninsula.

Golden Eagle had its own post office until October 22, 2011; it still has its own ZIP Code, 62036. The post office opened in 1967 next to the Haug General Store, which leased the building to the Post Office Department. Prior to then, Golden Eagle was part of a rural mail route which spanned both sides of the Mississippi River; resident Harold Hetzler operated the route in the early 1960s.

Golden Eagle is the site of a ferry across the Mississippi River that connects the community to St. Charles County, Missouri. The ferry originally used a paddle steamer for its operations. Local politicians proposed replacing the ferry with a bridge in both the late 1940s and the 1960s, but their efforts were unsuccessful.
