= Port Louisa National Wildlife Refuge =

Wildlife refuge in Iowa and Illinois, United States

- IUCN category IV (habitat/species management area)
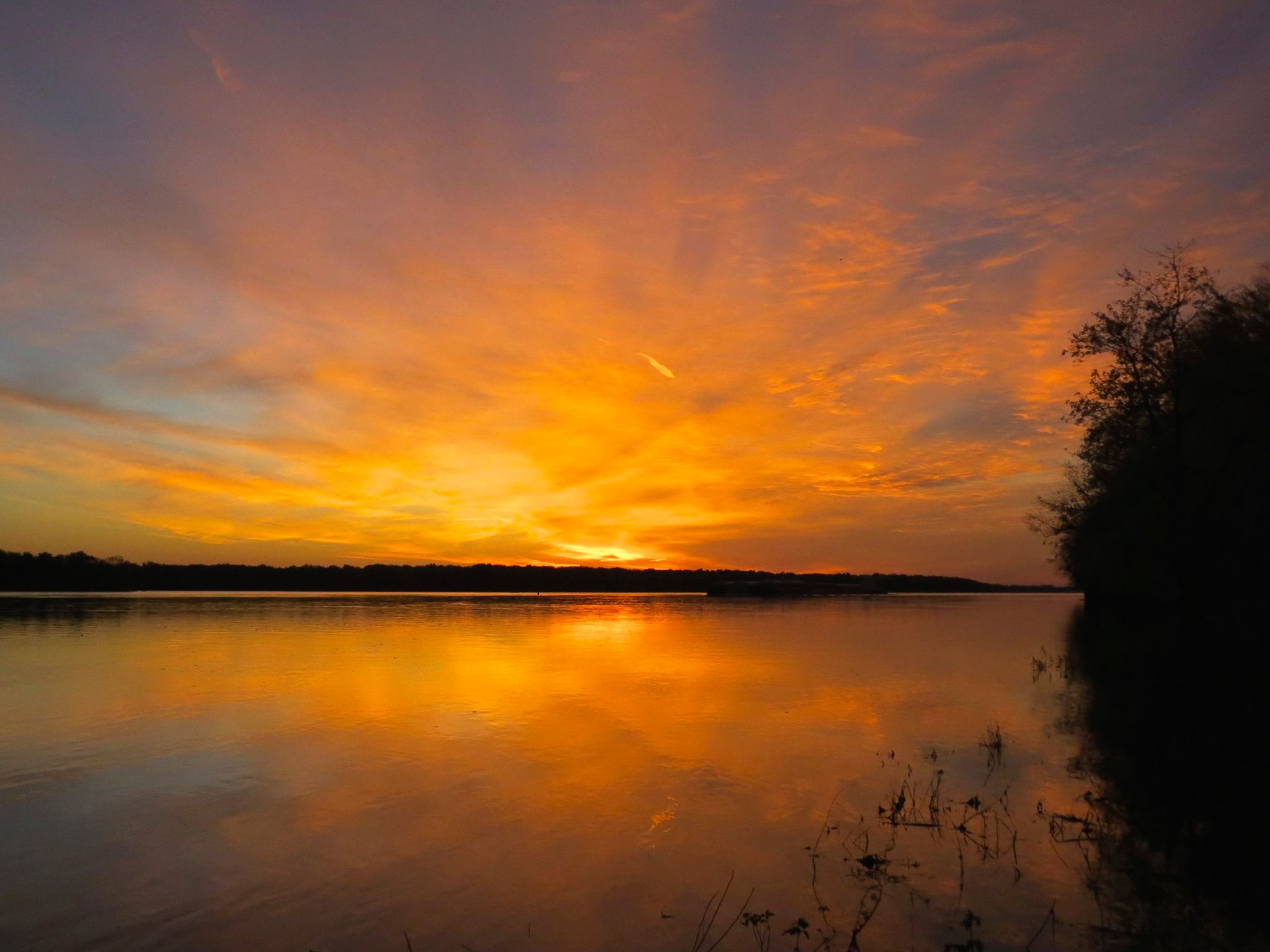
- Sunrise over the Mississippi River at Port Louisa National Wildlife Refuge in Iowa

- Location within the United States Location within Illinois Location within Iowa
- Location: Louisa County, Iowa, Mercer County, Illinois, United States
- Nearest city: Wapello, Iowa
- Coordinates: 41°12′00″N 91°02′00″W
- Area: 10,780 acres (43.6 km^{2})
- Established: 1958
- Governing body: U.S. Fish and Wildlife Service
- Website: Port Louisa National Wildlife Refuge

Port Louisa National Wildlife Refuge is a 10,780-acre (43.6 km^{2}) National Wildlife Refuge located on the Mississippi River at the border of Illinois and Iowa. The refuge is east of Wapello, in Louisa County, Iowa and Mercer County, Illinois.

Port Louisa is divided into four divisions: Louisa, Horseshoe Bend, Big Timber (including the islands) and Keithsburg.

Port Louisa is the northernmost refuge in the Mark Twain National Wildlife Refuge Complex. The refuge provides several opportunities for public use including hunting, fishing, hiking, photography, interpretation, environmental education, and wildlife observation (not all activities are allowed on all divisions).

Port Louisa was established for the protection of migratory birds. It is located along the Mississippi Flyway, one of the major routes for migrating waterfowl. Key goals of the refuge are to conserve and enhance the quality and diversity of fish and wildlife and their habitats; and to restore floodplain functions in the river corridor.
