= Michael, Illinois =

- Unincorporated community
- Location within Illinois Location within the United States
- Coordinates: 39°14′07″N 90°37′24″W
- Country: United States
- State: Illinois
- County: Calhoun
- Elevation: 446 ft (136 m)
- Time zone: UTC-6 (Central (CST))
  - Summer (DST): UTC-5 (CDT)
- ZIP Code: 62065
- Area code: 618
- GNIS feature ID: 413471

Michael is an unincorporated community in Calhoun County, Illinois, United States. The community is on Illinois Route 100 5.5 miles (8.9 km) north of Hardin. Michael had a post office until September 7, 2011; it still has its own ZIP Code, 62065. Michael, along with the rest of Calhoun County, is within Metro East and part of the Greater St. Louis area.
