= Two Rivers National Wildlife Refuge =

Protected area in the states of Illinois and Missouri, United States

- IUCN category IV (habitat/species management area)
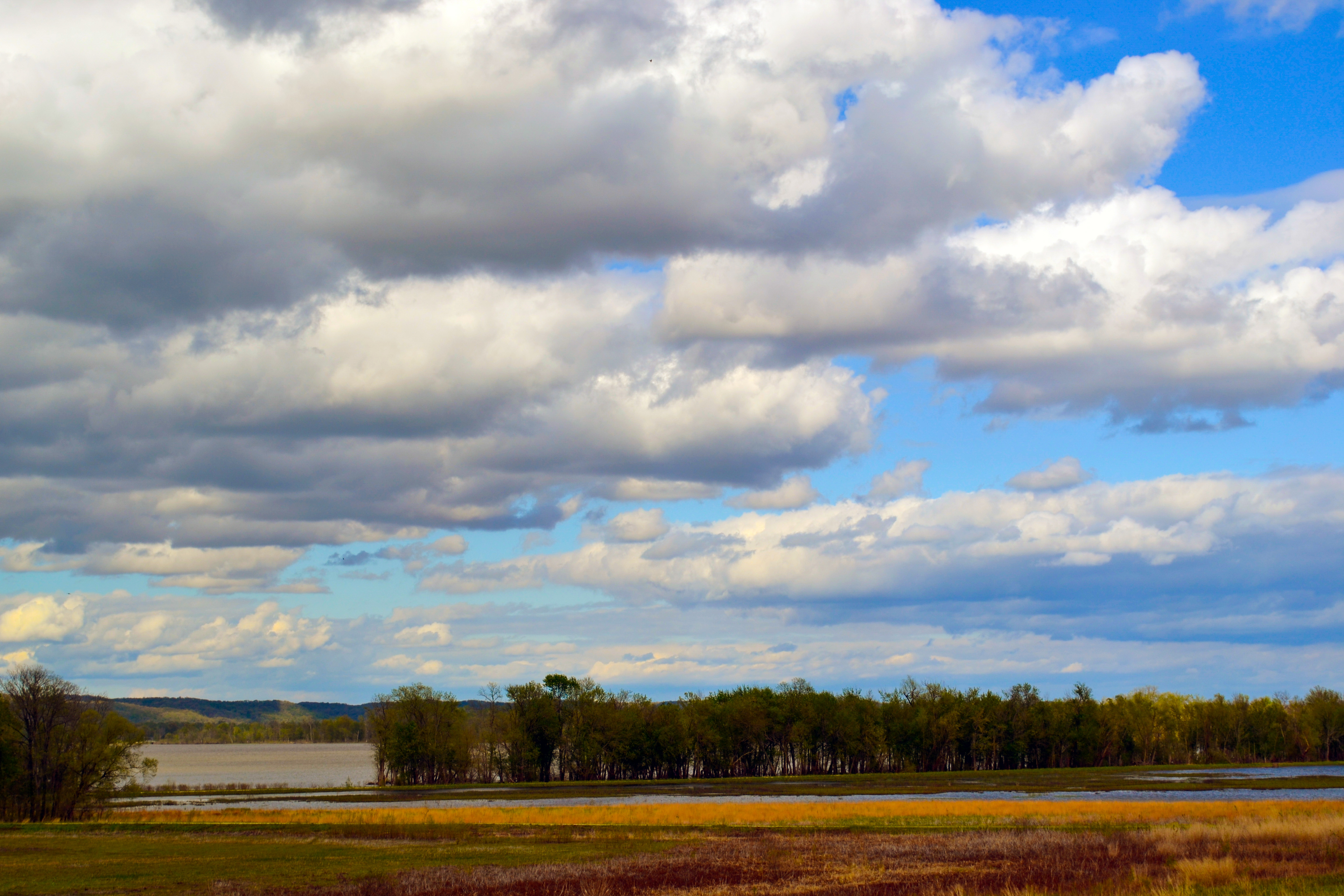
- Two Rivers National Wildlife Refuge, April 2014

- Location within the United States Location within Missouri Location within Illinois
- Location: Calhoun County, Jersey County, Greene County, Illinois, St. Charles County, Missouri, United States
- Coordinates: 39°02′30″N 90°36′30″W
- Area: 8,501 acres (34.40 km^{2})
- Established: 1958
- Governing body: U.S. Fish and Wildlife Service
- Website: Two Rivers National Wildlife Refuge

The Two Rivers National Wildlife Refuge is located on the Illinois River and the Mississippi River in parts of Calhoun, Jersey, and Greene counties in Illinois, and St. Charles County, Missouri. It is managed by the U.S. Fish and Wildlife Service as part of the Mark Twain National Wildlife Refuge Complex.

As of 2009, the Two Rivers National Wildlife Refuge consists of five separate parcels of riverine bottomland wetlands grouped in and around the confluence of the Illinois and the Mississippi Rivers (hence the name, Two Rivers). The region is noted for its population of bald eagles.

The refuge is 8,501 acres (34 square km) in size. Its headquarters is located in the Calhoun County municipality of Brussels, Illinois.
