= Mozier Landing, Illinois =

- Unincorporated community
- Location within Illinois Location within the United States
- Coordinates: 39°15′20″N 90°43′33″W
- Country: United States
- State: Illinois
- County: Calhoun
- Elevation: 443 ft (135 m)
- Time zone: UTC-6 (Central (CST))
  - Summer (DST): UTC-5 (CDT)
- Area code: 618
- GNIS feature ID: 414160

Mozier Landing is an unincorporated community in Calhoun County, Illinois, United States. Mozier Landing is located along the Mississippi River north of Hamburg.
