= Kampsville, Illinois =

- Village
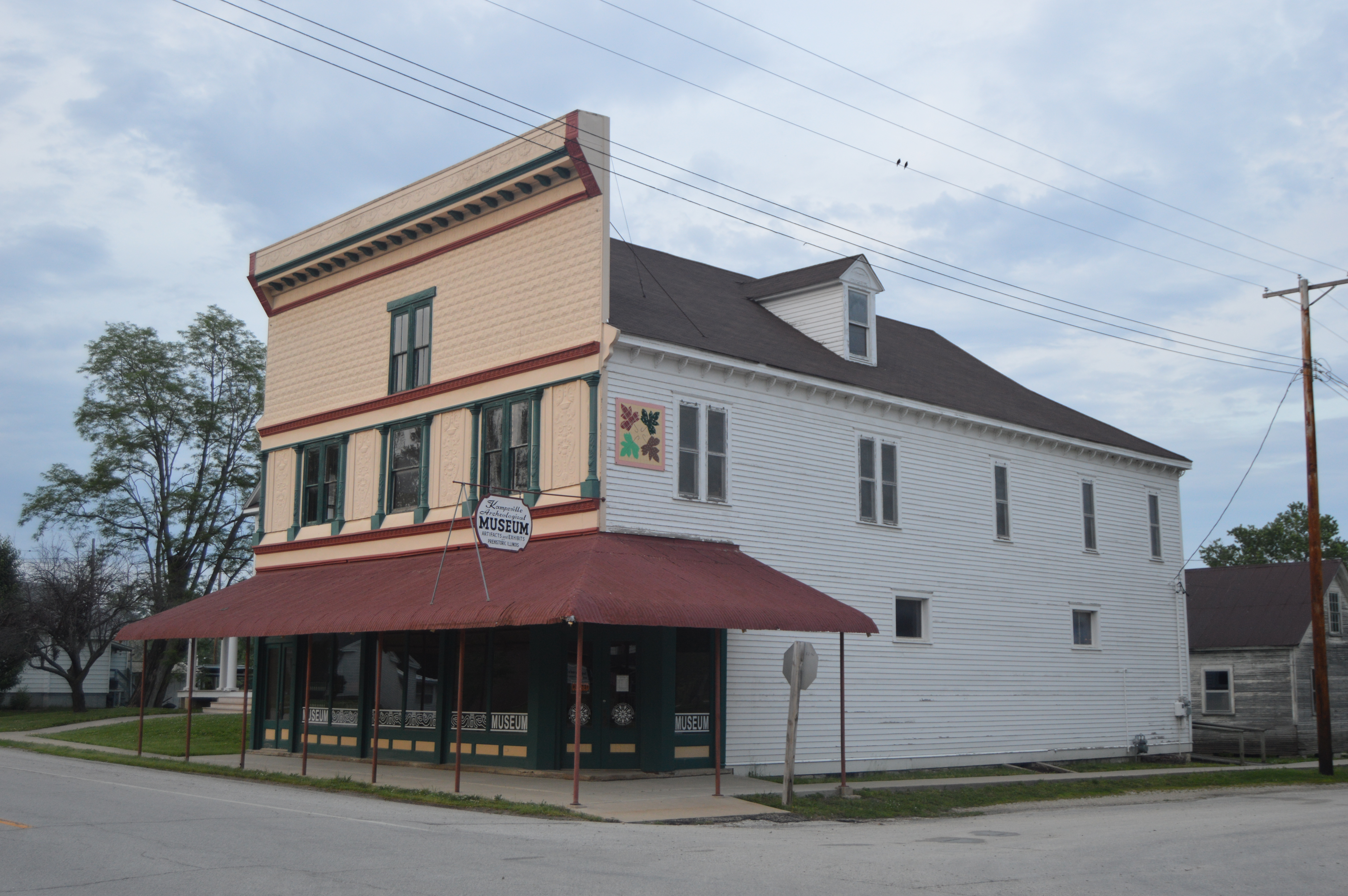
- The Kamp Store, a historic site in the village

- Location of Kampsville in Calhoun County, Illinois.
- Coordinates: 39°17′50″N 90°36′46″W
- Country: United tates
- State: Illinois
- County: Calhoun
- Precincts: Crater, Carlin
- Named for: Michael A. Kamp

Area
  - Total: 1.24 sq mi (3.21 km^{2})
  - Land: 1.02 sq mi (2.64 km^{2})
  - Water: 0.22 sq mi (0.57 km^{2})
- Elevation: 443 ft (135 m)

Population (2020)
  - Total: 310
  - Density: 300/sq mi (120/km^{2})
- Time zone: UTC-6 (CST)
  - Summer (DST): UTC-5 (CDT)
- ZIP code: 62053
- Area codes: 618/730
- FIPS code: 17-38856
- GNIS feature ID: 23983235

Kampsville is a village in Crater and Carlin precincts, Calhoun County, Illinois, United States, located on the west bank of the Illinois River. The population was 310 at the 2020 census.

The Kampsville ferry crosses the Illinois River and connects the Kampsville segment of Illinois Route 108 with its remainder in Greene County. The ferry is free and runs 24 hours a day, seven days a week. It is one of two permanent ferries operated by the Illinois Department of Transportation.

The village is the base of operations for the Center for American Archeology, an educational and research organization dedicated to the archeological understanding of the Native Americans and of the European settlers in the region. It contains exhibits demonstrating evidence of 7,000 years of human habitation excavated at the Koster Site in nearby Greene County.

== Name ==
Kampsville was originally known as Beeman's Landing, after James L. Beeman, a ferry operator on the Illinois River. After Stephen Farrow purchased the ferry from Beeman, the name was changed to Farrowtown. The name Vedder was used when the post office was established in 1857. The name Kampsville was made official on March 6, 1872, and refers to Michael A. Kamp, who served as president of the village board and was also a postmaster at Silver Creek, north of Kampsville.

== Geography ==
According to the 2021 census gazetteer files, Kampsville has a total area of 1.24 square miles (3.21 km^{2}), of which 1.02 square miles (2.64 km^{2}) (or 82.26%) is land and 0.22 square miles (0.57 km^{2}) (or 17.74%) is water.

Three highways run through the village. They are Route 100, Route 96, and a small portion of Route 108 leads to the Kampsville ferry.

== Demographics ==
Historical population
Census	Pop.	Note	%±
1880	79		—
1890	172		117.7%
1900	330		91.9%
1910	506		53.3%
1920	428		−15.4%
1930	388		−9.3%
1940	432		11.3%
1950	437		1.2%
1960	453		3.7%
1970	439		−3.1%
1980	423		−3.6%
1990	399		−5.7%
2000	302		−24.3%
2010	328		8.6%
2020	310		−5.5%
U.S. Decennial Census

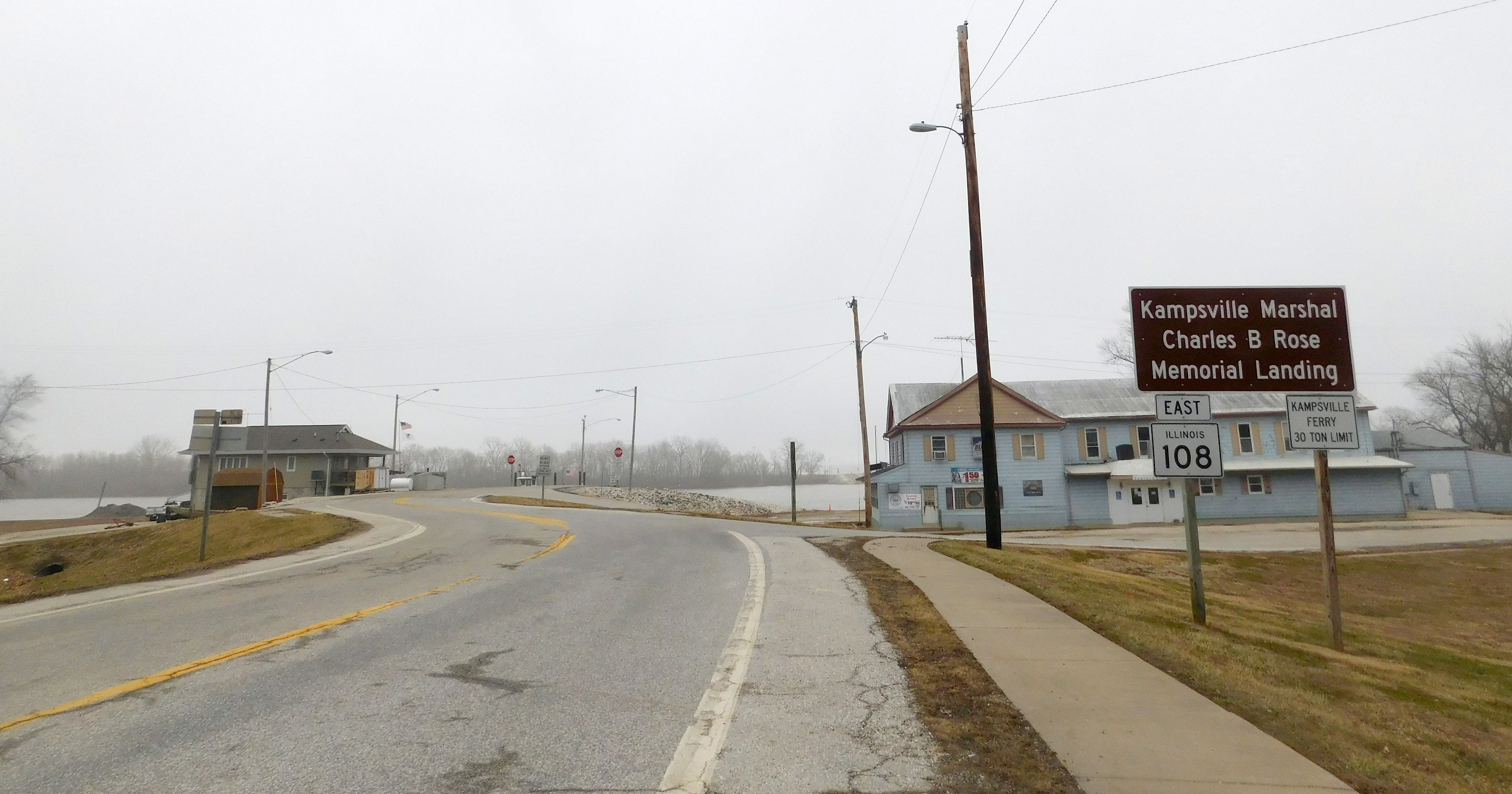
Ferry landing in Kampsville

As of the 2020 census there were 310 people, 132 households, and 96 families residing in the village. The population density was 250.00 inhabitants per square mile (96.53/km^{2}). There were 175 housing units at an average density of 141.13 per square mile (54.49/km^{2}). The racial makeup of the village was 91.29% White, 1.29% Native American, and 7.42% from two or more races. Hispanic or Latino of any race were 2.58% of the population.

There were 132 households, out of which 28.8% had children under the age of 18 living with them, 55.30% were married couples living together, 15.15% had a female householder with no husband present, and 27.27% were non-families. 27.27% of all households were made up of individuals, and 11.36% had someone living alone who was 65 years of age or older. The average household size was 2.76 and the average family size was 2.30.

The village's age distribution consisted of 29.3% under the age of 18, 7.8% from 18 to 24, 18.7% from 25 to 44, 20.6% from 45 to 64, and 23.7% who were 65 years of age or older. The median age was 39.1 years. For every 100 females, there were 95.7 males. For every 100 females age 18 and over, there were 78.7 males.

The median income for a household in the village was $49,583, and the median income for a family was $57,500. Males had a median income of $38,438 versus $32,500 for females. The per capita income for the village was $22,374. About 26.0% of families and 31.3% of the population were below the poverty line, including 56.4% of those under age 18 and 15.8% of those age 65 or over.

== Education ==
The school district is Calhoun Community Unit School District 40.
