= Batchtown, Illinois =

- Village
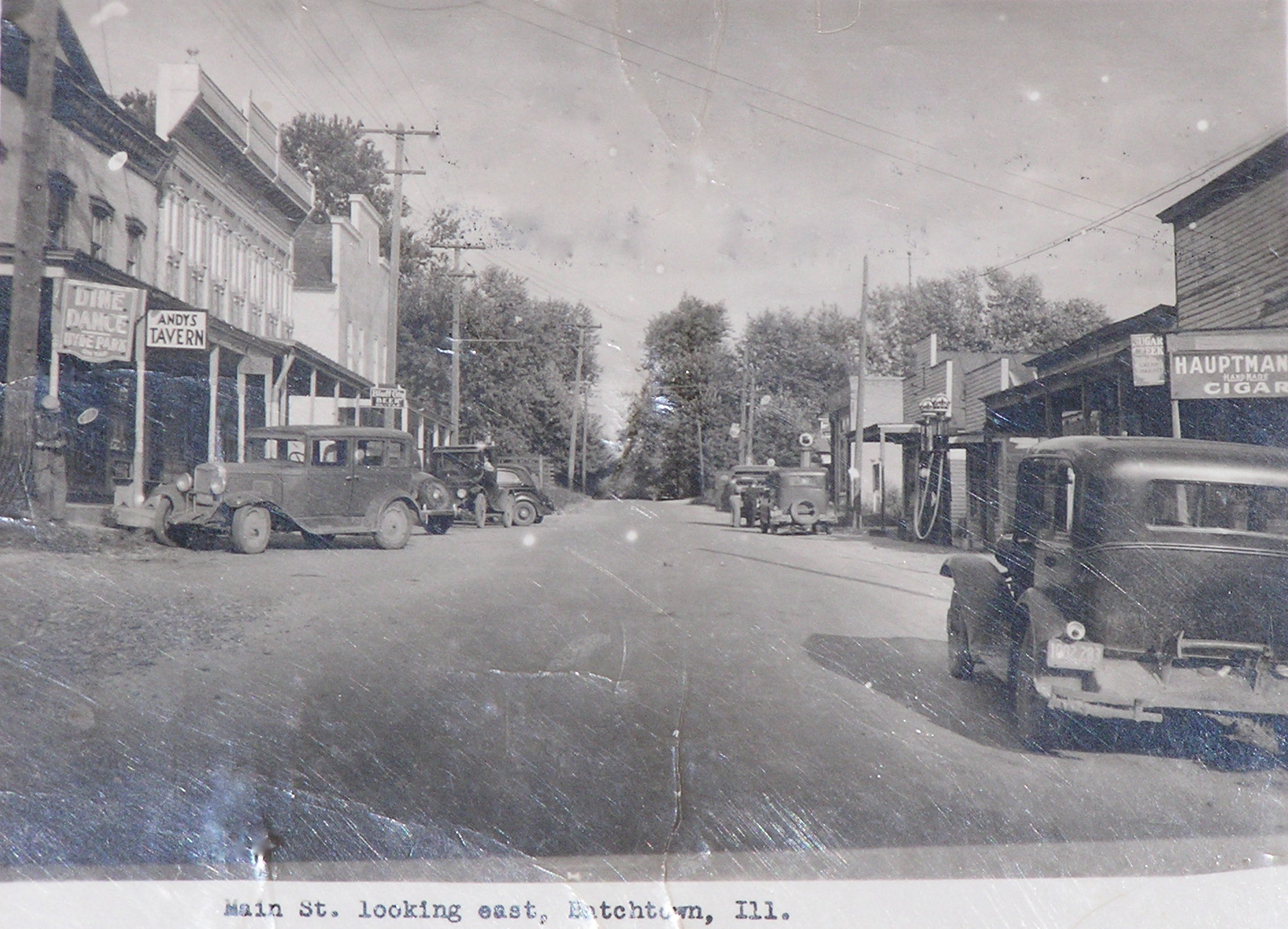
- Main Street Batchtown in the 1930s

- Location of Batchtown in Calhoun County, Illinois.
- Coordinates: 39°02′00″N 90°39′12″W
- Country: United States
- State: Illinois
- County: Calhoun
- Precinct: Richwood
- Named for: William Batchelder

Area
  - Total: 1.863 sq mi (4.83 km^{2})
  - Land: 1.863 sq mi (4.83 km^{2})
  - Water: 0.00 sq mi (0 km^{2})
- Elevation: 594 ft (181 m)

Population (2020)
  - Total: 170
  - Density: 91/sq mi (35/km^{2})
- Time zone: UTC-6 (CST)
  - Summer (DST): UTC-5 (CDT)
- ZIP code: 62006
- Area codes: 618/730
- FIPS code: 17-04117
- GNIS feature ID: 2398048

Batchtown is a village in Richwood Precinct, Calhoun County, Illinois, United States. The population was 170 at the 2020 census, down from 214 at the 2010 census.

== History ==
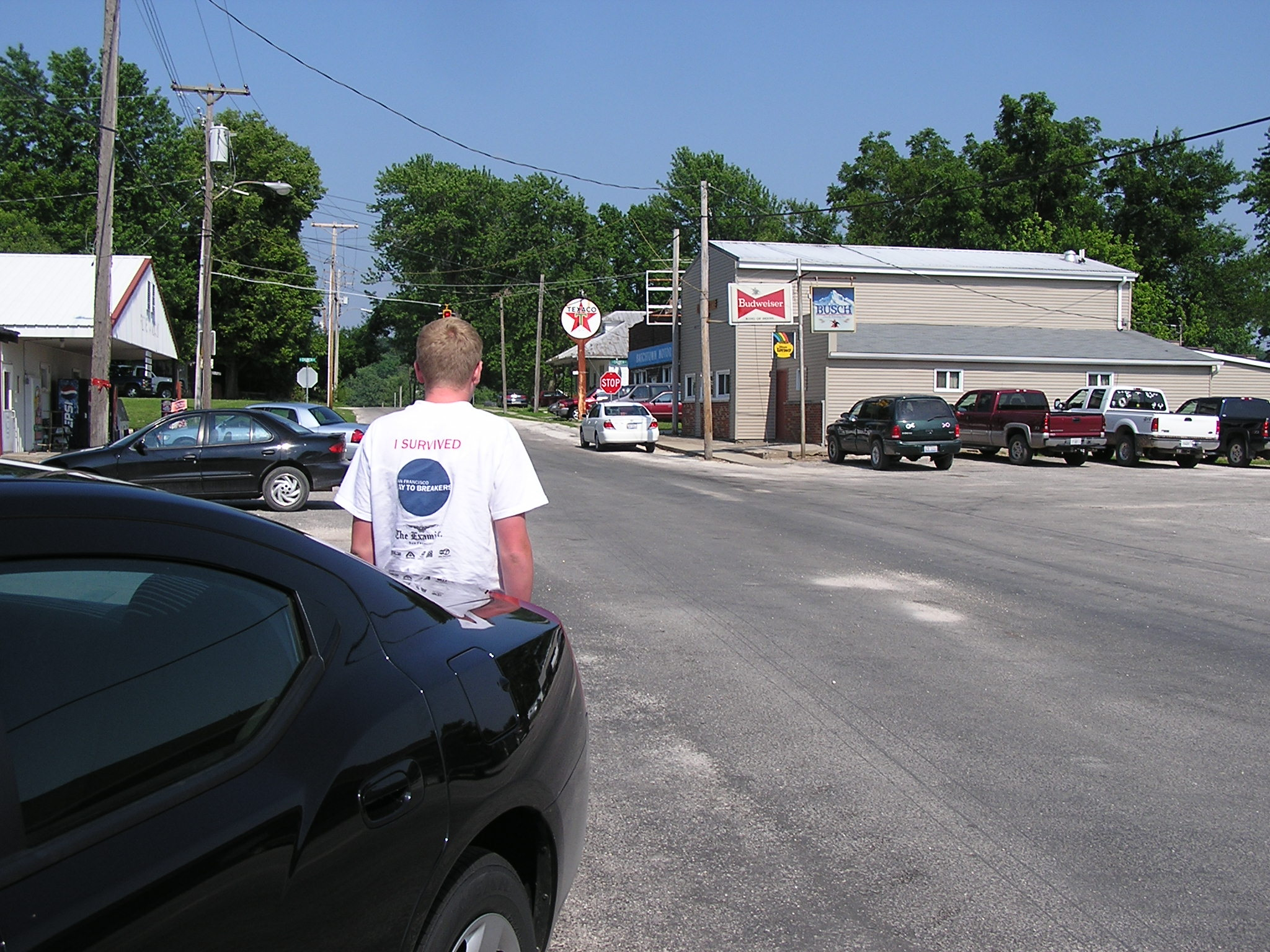
Main Street looking east 2008

The village and the area surrounding it was called Richwoods during the 1850s. Then people started referring to the area as Sam White's, after a leading merchant in Calhoun County. It was later called Batchelder Ville, after William Batchelder, who lived in the village during the 1860s. A post office opened up in the community in 1879 and Batchtown became the official name of the village.

By the time the village was incorporated, there were several stores and shops. The Grand Army of the Republic set up a post in the village and the first Batchtown Methodist Church was set up.

William Batchelder was a leading citizen in the community. He owned and operated a corn mill in Batchtown. He later changed the corn mill into a flour mill. William Batchelder was also a justice of the peace and merchant.

Samuel White was also a leading citizen in Batchtown. He owned a store in the village that sold stock groceries, dry goods, shoes, and hardware. He also sold farm machinery.

== Geography ==
According to the 2021 census gazetteer files, Batchtown has a total area of 1.86 square miles (4.82 km^{2}), all land.

== Demographics ==
Historical population
Census	Pop.	Note	%±
1900	360		—
1910	300		−16.7%
1920	273		−9.0%
1930	249		−8.8%
1940	297		19.3%
1950	237		−20.2%
1960	248		4.6%
1970	217		−12.5%
1980	254		17.1%
1990	225		−11.4%
2000	218		−3.1%
2010	214		−1.8%
2020	170		−20.6%
U.S. Decennial Census

As of the 2020 census, there were 170 people, 69 households, and 53 families residing in the village. The population density was 91.25 inhabitants per square mile (35.23/km^{2}). There were 93 housing units at an average density of 49.92 per square mile (19.27/km^{2}). The racial makeup of the village was 97.06% White and 2.94% from two or more races. Hispanic or Latino of any race were 1.76% of the population.

There were 69 households, out of which 37.7% had children under the age of 18 living with them, 73.91% were married couples living together, 2.90% had a female householder with no husband present, and 23.19% were non-families. 23.19% of all households were made up of individuals, and 23.19% had someone living alone who was 65 years of age or older. The average household size was 3.28 and the average family size was 2.93.

The village's age distribution consisted of 35.1% under the age of 18, 1.0% from 18 to 24, 20.9% from 25 to 44, 20.7% from 45 to 64, and 22.3% who were 65 years of age or older. The median age was 43.3 years. For every 100 females, there were 149.4 males. For every 100 females age 18 and over, there were 107.9 males.

The median income for a household in the village was $67,917, and the median income for a family was $83,125. Males had a median income of $70,000 versus $33,750 for females. The per capita income for the village was $27,152. No families and 2.6% of the population were below the poverty line, including none of those under age 18 and 11.1% of those age 65 or over.

== Education ==
The school district is Calhoun Community Unit School District 40.

== Notable person ==
- Bill McGee, pitcher for the St. Louis Cardinals and New York Giants

== Gallery ==
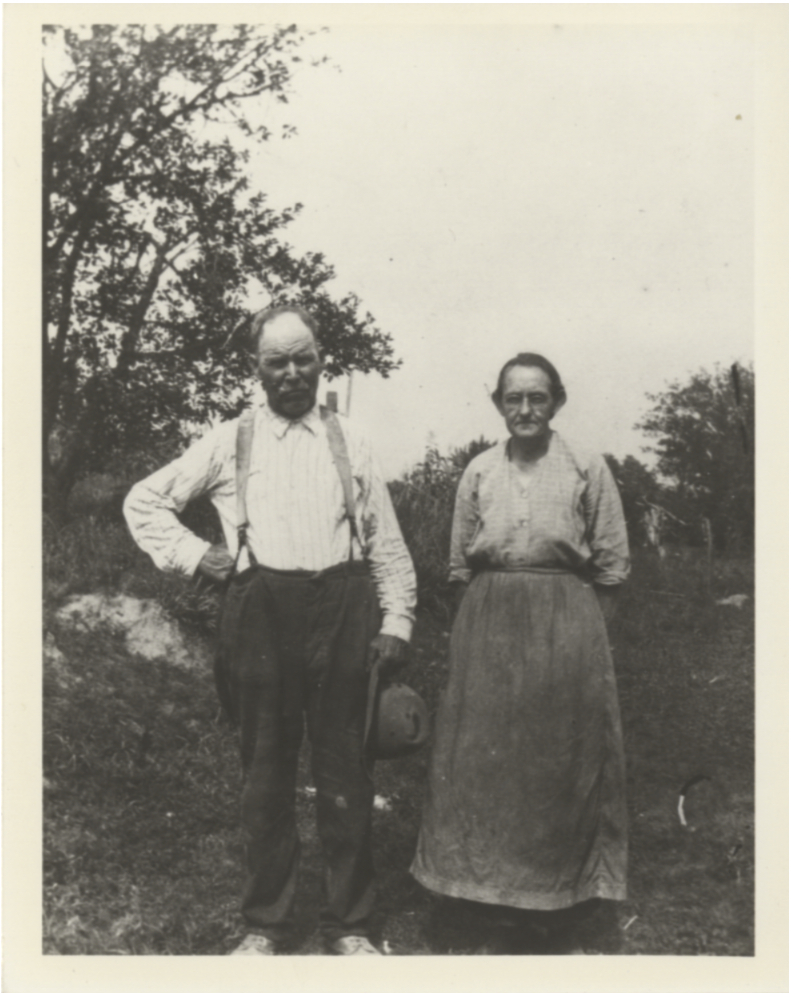
Charles and Fanny Wilson Shannon

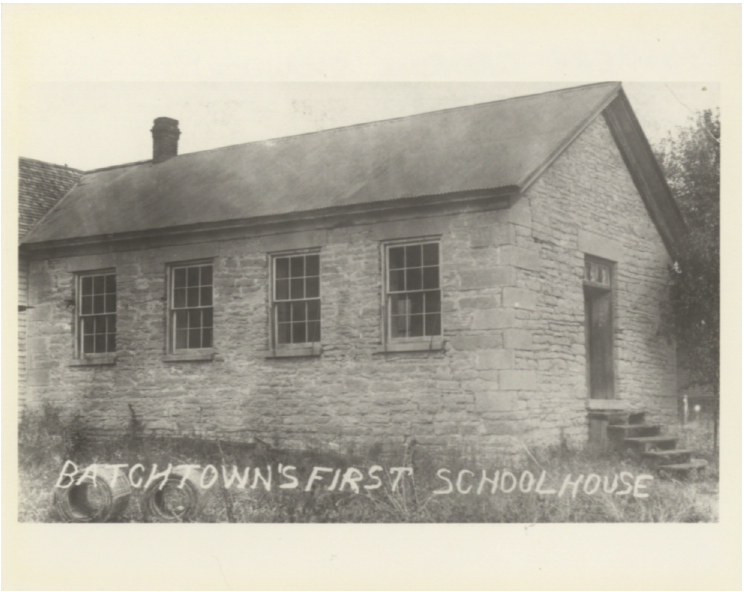
First School Building

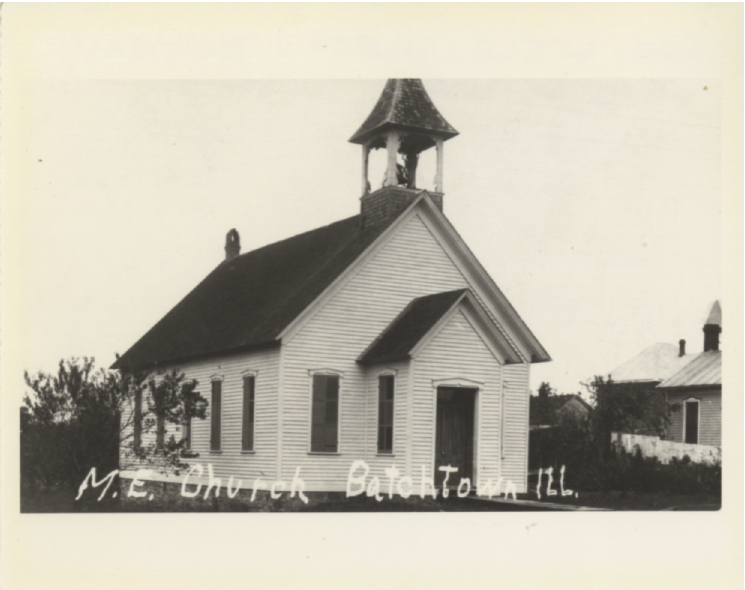
At turn of the 20th century

On back of photo "My grandfather owned it (Andrew Wilson). Ferry was pulled by horses. Mom (Lucy Shannon Whitten Walters)"
