= National Register of Historic Places listings in Crawford County, Illinois =

Location of Crawford County in Illinois

This is a list of the National Register of Historic Places listings in Crawford County, Illinois.

This is intended to be a complete list of the properties and districts on the National Register of Historic Places in Crawford County, Illinois, United States. Latitude and longitude coordinates are provided for many National Register properties and districts; these locations may be seen together in a map.

There are 7 properties and districts listed on the National Register in the county, and one former listing.

This National Park Service list is complete through NPS recent listings posted March 21, 2025.

== Current listings ==
	Name on the Register	Image	Date listed	Location	City or town	Description
1	Dr. Arthur W. Allen Home		December 30, 2020 (#100005966)	11266 North Trimble Rd. 39°01′04″N 87°43′36″W	Robinson	
2	Fife Opera House	Fife Opera House	January 26, 1990 (#89002348)	123-125 S. Main St. 39°00′07″N 87°36′47″W	Palestine	
3	John B. Harper House	John B. Harper House	March 15, 2004 (#03001199)	102 N. Lincoln St. 39°00′12″N 87°36′40″W	Palestine	
4	Palestine Commercial Historic District	Palestine Commercial Historic District	August 4, 1995 (#95000985)	101-223 and 106-322 S. Main St. 39°00′08″N 87°36′47″W	Palestine	
5	Riverton Site	Riverton Site	December 18, 1978 (#78001141)	Northern side of 1150th Avenue immediately west of the Wabash River, northeast of Palestine; 39°01′18″N 87°34′32″W	Palestine	
6	Stoner Site	Stoner Site	December 18, 1978 (#78001143)	Eastern side of 1550th St. between 1300th and 1235th Aves. 39°02′18″N 87°39′20″W	Robinson	
7	Swan Island Site	Swan Island Site	December 18, 1978 (#78001142)	Northern side of the junction of the Wabash River and the Crawford/Lawrence county line 38°51′12″N 87°32′18″W	Palestine	

== Former listings ==
	Name on the Register	Image	Date listed	Date removed	Location	City or town	Description
1	Robinson High School Auditorium-Gymnasium	Robinson High School Auditorium-Gymnasium	May 22, 2005 (#05000434)	January 2, 2020	200 block of E. Highland Ave. 39°01′13″N 87°44′19″W	Robinson	

== See also ==
- List of National Historic Landmarks in Illinois
- National Register of Historic Places listings in Illinois
