= Allenhurst =

Allenhurst may refer to:

In the United States

- Allenhurst, Florida
- Allenhurst, Georgia
- The Dr. Arthur W. Allen Home in Robinson, Illinois, also known as Allenhurst
- Allenhurst (Scott County, Kentucky), near Georgetown, Kentucky, listed on the National Register of Historic Places
- Allenhurst, New Jersey
- Allenhurst, Texas
