= Ashland Park =

- Ashland Park Historic District
- U.S. National Register of Historic Places
- U.S. Historic district
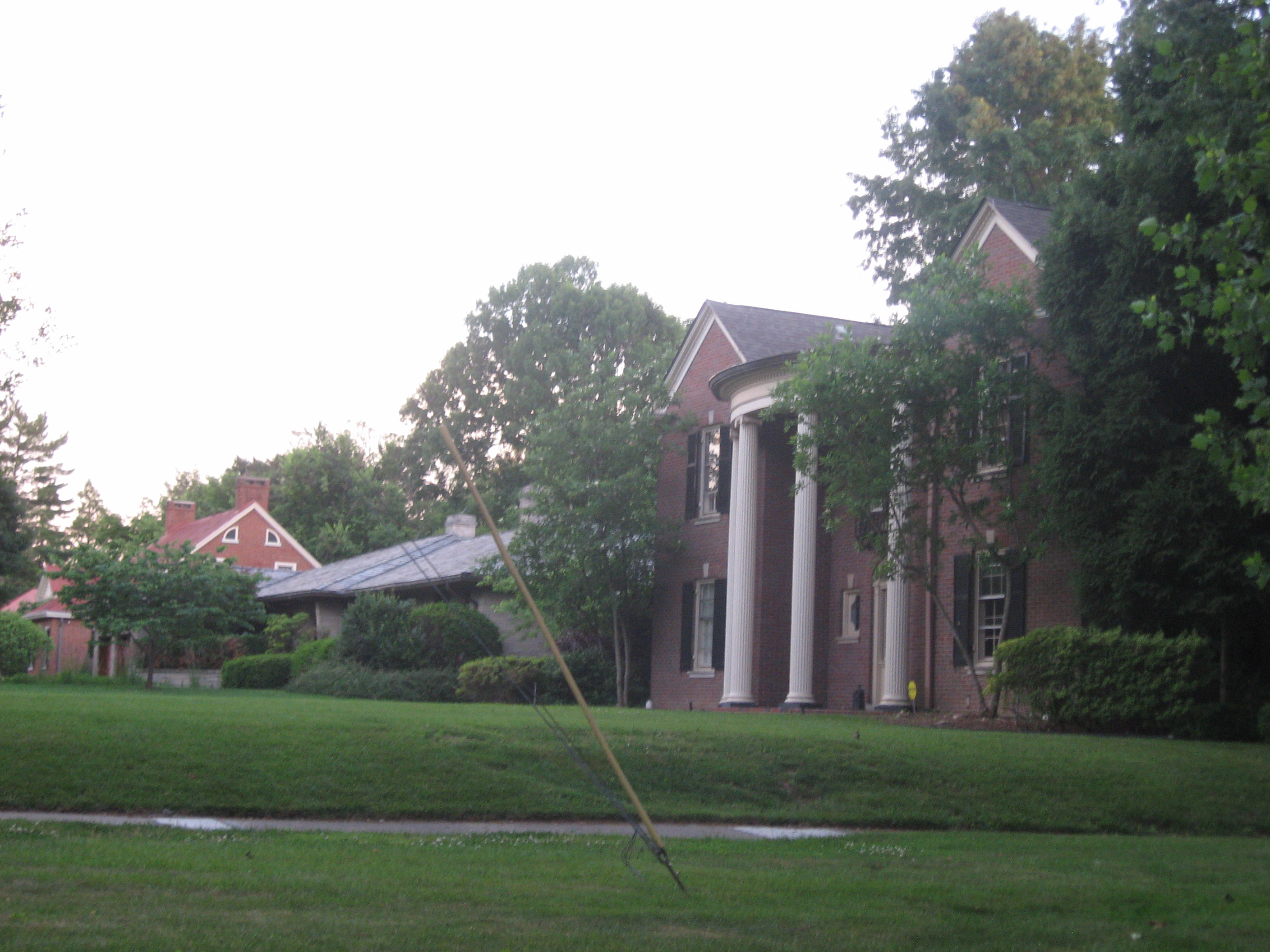
- Houses on Ashwood Drive

- Location within Kentucky Location within the United States
- Location: Roughly bounded by Ashland Ave., Richmond Rd., Chinoe Rd., and Fontaine Rd., Lexington, Kentucky
- Coordinates: 38°01′45″N 84°28′56″W
- Area: 188.9 acres (76.4 ha)
- Architect: Olmsted Bros.
- Architectural style: Colonial Revival, Bungalow/craftsman, American Foursquare
- NRHP reference No.: 86000755
- Added to NRHP: March 31, 1986

Ashland Park is a historic early 20th century neighborhood in Lexington, Kentucky, United States. It was named after Ashland, the estate of Kentucky statesman Henry Clay which is located in the eastern portion of the neighborhood. The 600-acre (2.4 km^{2}) development was designed by the famous landscape architecture firm the Olmsted Brothers of Massachusetts. The neighborhood belongs to the National Register of Historic Places.

Prominent architectural styles of houses and apartment buildings in the neighborhood include American Foursquare, American Craftsman, Colonial Revival, and Tudor Revival.

The neighborhood's boundaries are Ashland Avenue to the west, East Main Street (U.S. Route 25) to the north, Chinoe Road to the east, and Fontaine Road to the south. The commercial district of Chevy Chase borders Ashland Park on the south. In 2000 the population was 1,864.
