= Madison County Courthouse (Kentucky) =

- U.S. National Register of Historic Places
- U.S. Historic district – Contributing property
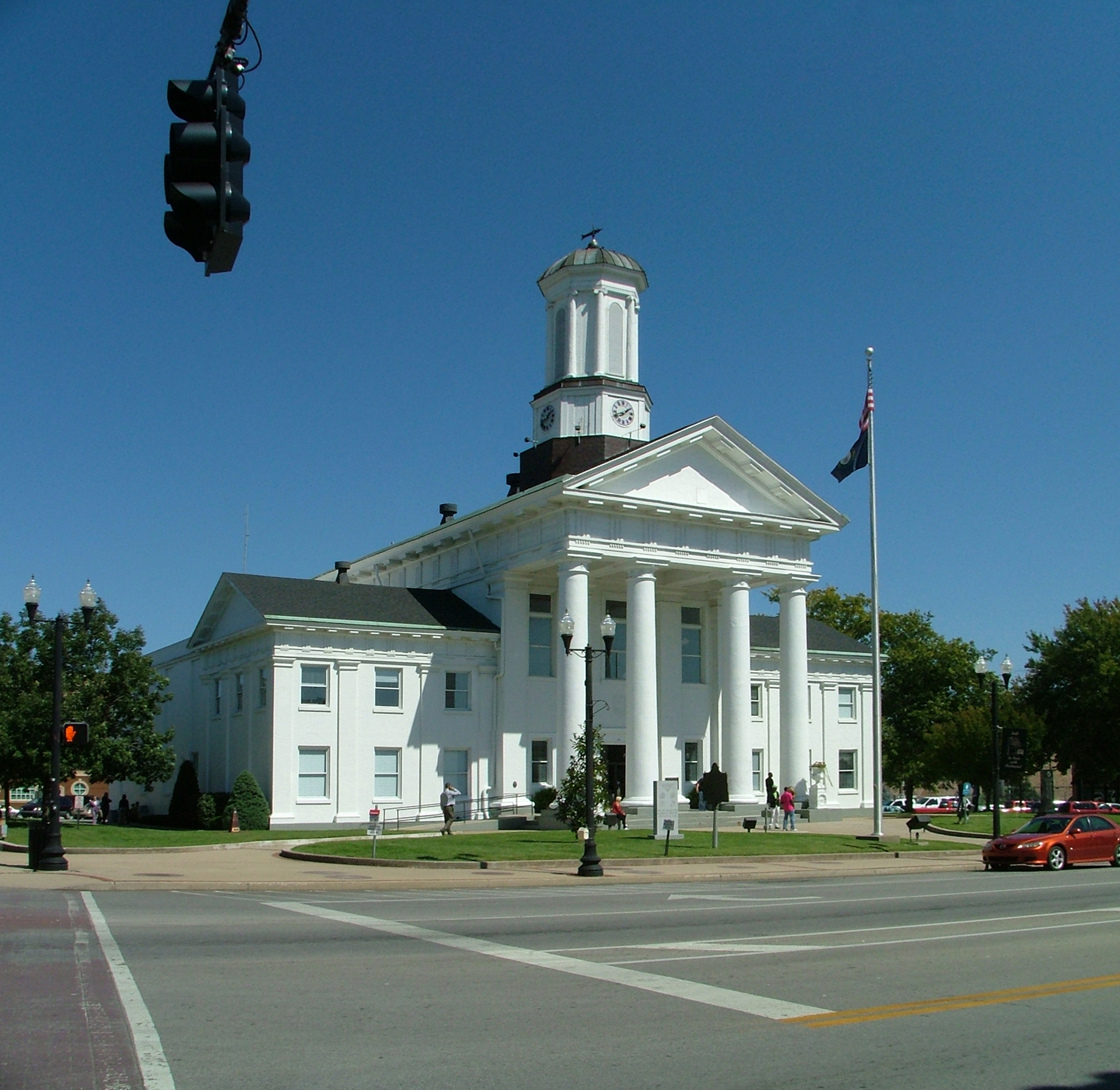
- Main Street view

- Location within Kentucky Location within the United States
- Location: Main St. between N. 1st and N. 2nd Sts., Richmond, Kentucky
- Coordinates: 37°44′51″N 84°16′59″W
- Area: less than one acre
- Built: 1850
- Built by: John McMurtry
- Architect: Thomas Lewinski
- Architectural style: Greek Revival
- Part of: Downtown Richmond Historic District (ID76000922)
- NRHP reference No.: 75000800

Significant dates
- Added to NRHP: May 12, 1975
- Designated CP: September 30, 1976

The Madison County Courthouse is a historic courthouse in Richmond, Kentucky, United States, which serves as the seat of government for Madison County. It is a Greek Revival structure originally built in 1849–1850 by John McMurtry according to the designs of Thomas Lewinski, the two of whom were some of the most prominent architects in central Kentucky during the nineteenth century. It has been expanded and remodeled several times since, most recently in 1965. The building was listed on the National Register of Historic Places in 1975.

== Background ==
Madison County, named ultimately for the fourth President of the United States, James Madison, was created by the state of Virginia in 1785, and formed one of the nine original counties of Kentucky when the state was admitted to the Federal union in 1792. Richmond became the county seat in 1798, replacing Milford, four miles to the southwest, and was named for Richmond, Virginia, which was the birthplace of John Miller, the veteran of the American Revolution who founded the city. The first formal county courthouse, erected in 1798, consisted of a log cabin with an adjacent jail; before then, county services operated out of Miller's own barn. The following year, the log cabin was replaced by a plain, two-story brick building designed by Tyra Rhodes, which served for the following fifty years.

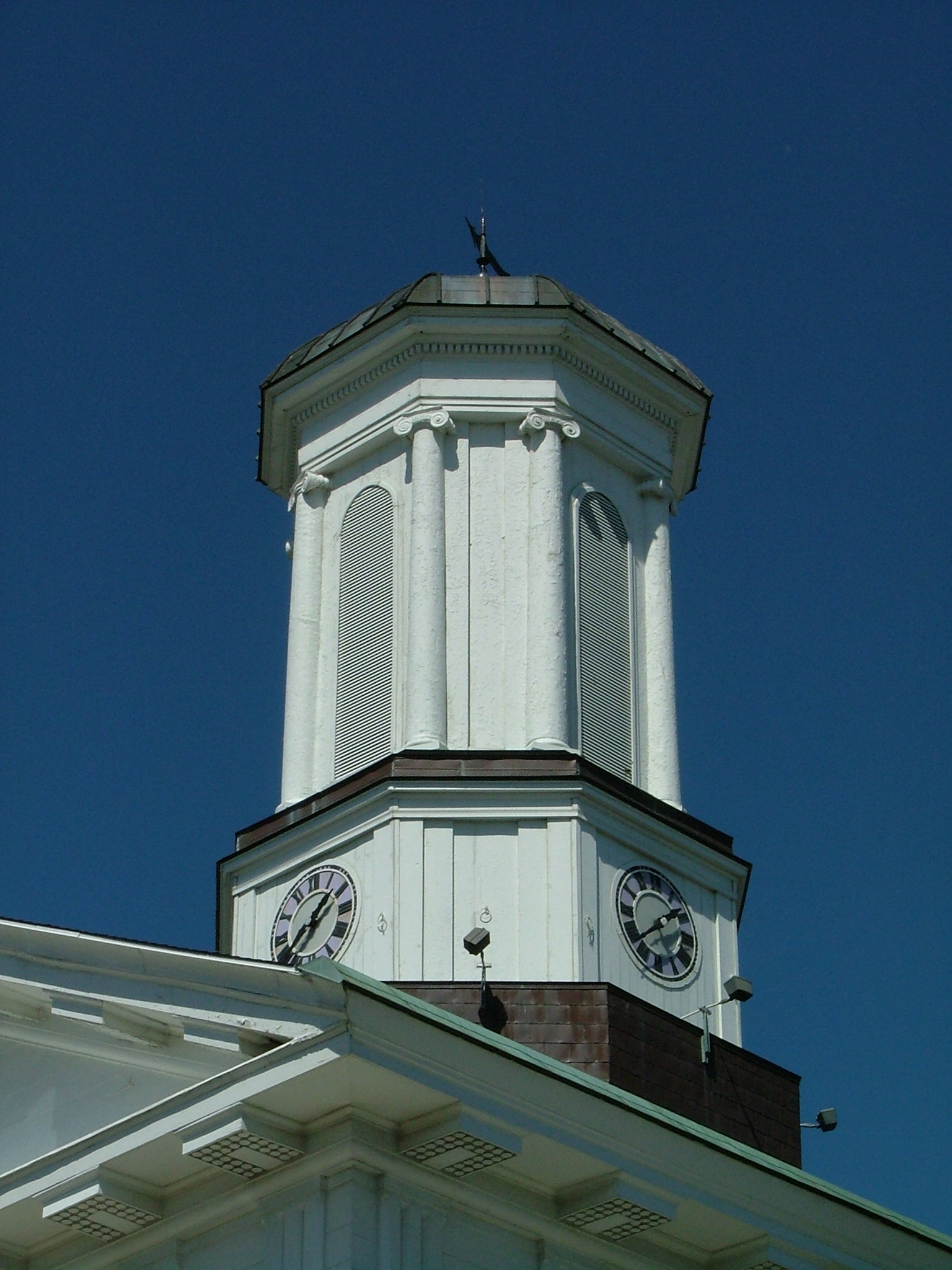
Detail of the cupola

Tyra Rhodes' nephew William Rhodes was one of the commissioners charged with procuring plans for construction of a new courthouse in the late 1840s. He sought to retain a reputable architect and hired Major Thomas Lewinski, an English immigrant who had received some formal training as an architect and made a name for himself as a proponent of the Greek Revival style in nearby Lexington. There his commissions included several important residences, including the second house at Ashland (1854–57) for James B. Clay (son of former U.S. Senator Henry Clay), and he would go on to design several other institutional structures in the region, such as Jacobs Hall at the Kentucky School for the Deaf (1857). McMurtry was himself a well-known designer who also ran his own construction company, often employed by Lewinski for many of his designs. Earlier McMurtry had been apprenticed to Gideon Shryock, the first important architect in central Kentucky, who was responsible for several very prominent Greek Revival structures, including the old Kentucky State Capitol building in Frankfort (1827–30) and Old Morrison at Transylvania University in Lexington (1830–34), as well as the first Arkansas state capitol building (1833–42) in Little Rock. Although he had no further architectural training aside from his employment under Shryock, McMurtry himself designed and constructed the Clark County Courthouse in Winchester, the Transylvania Dormitory and Medical Hall in Lexington, and the Kentucky Asylum for the Deaf and Dumb in Danville, among numerous other commissions. He is probably best-known today for his associations with the Gothic Revival in central Kentucky at this time.

== Original design ==
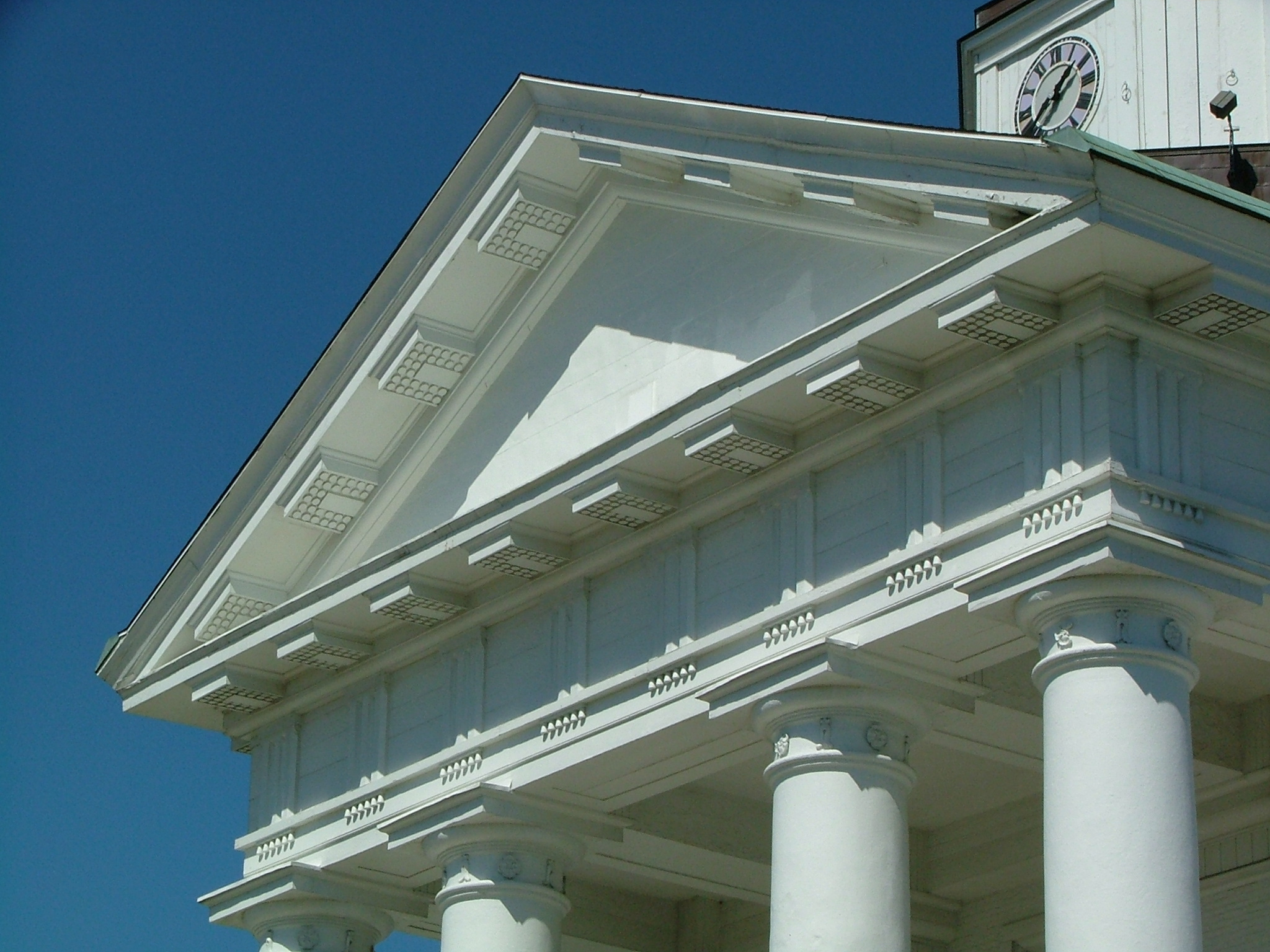
Detail of pediment of main portico

The courthouse is sited on Richmond's town square, facing Main Street, which runs down a slope past the structure; strangely, therefore, the courthouse is not located at the highest point of downtown. Surrounding Italianate and later Victorian buildings frame the courthouse and permit it to continue to dominate the immediate area, even today.

Lewinski's original design called for a cruciform-plan, south-facing two-story structure, which employed a monumental portico supported by four stout Roman Doric columns. The main block extends longitudinally to the north from the portico and rises higher than the two subsidiary wings that are recessed from the portico front and flank it on either side. This allows for the central block to contain the courtroom with its high ceiling on the second floor, a common characteristic in Kentucky courthouse architecture. Each of the subsidiary wings extending to the east and west also originally sported smaller porticoes on their respective ends, removed around 1890, but which originally emphasized the contrast in scale between the central block and the two wings. Undoubtedly, this contrast and the positioning of the courtroom on the second level in the central block referred to the elevated, intellectual activity of courtroom justice and judicial power relative to the mundane, everyday administrative work conducted in offices on the lower levels and in the two wings.

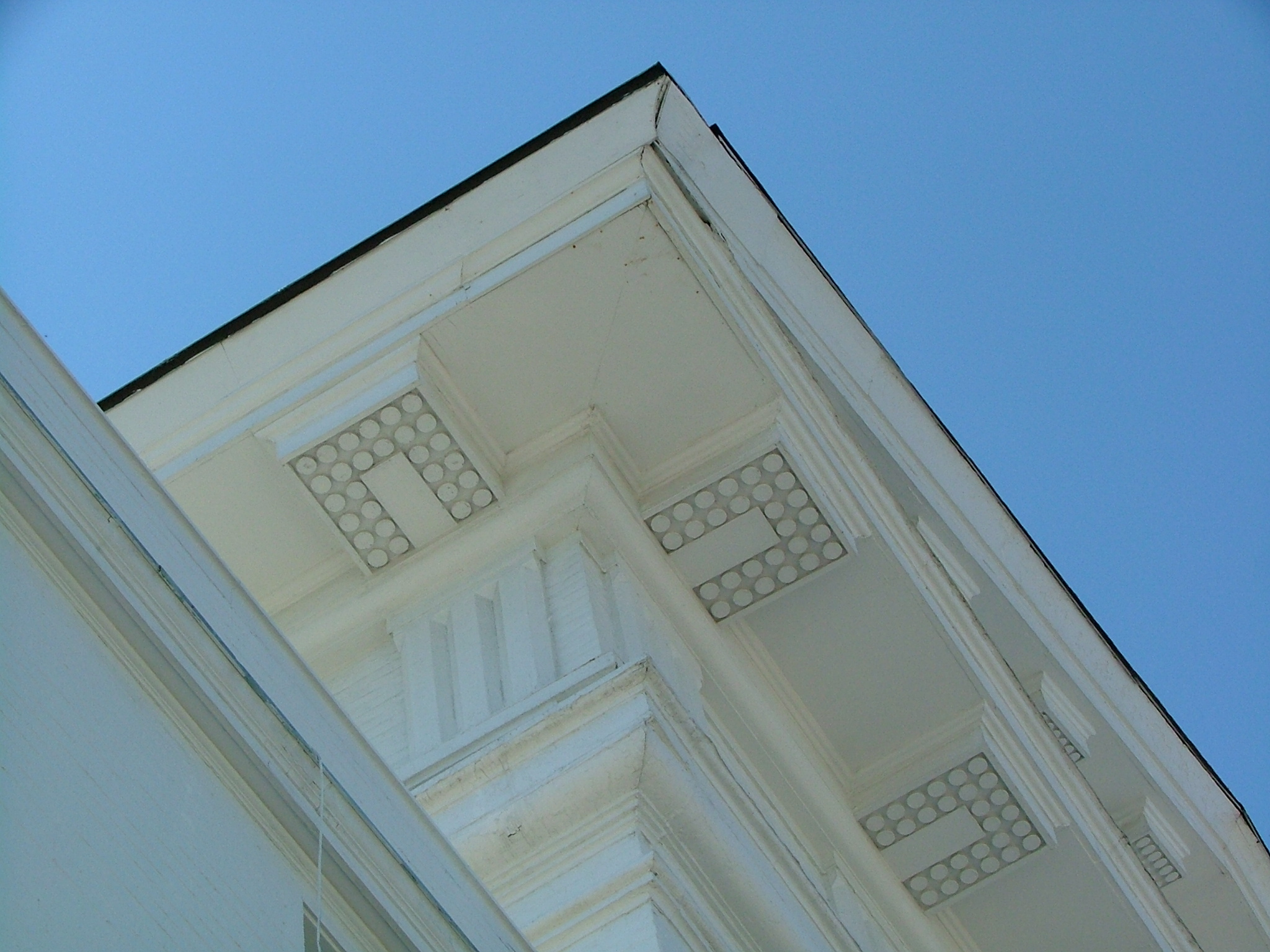
Detail of the modillions and cornice on the south façade

Above the central block and in line with the two wings rises a tall octagonal cupola, with four clock faces located respectively on each of the cardinal sides, just above its base. It is marked at each of its eight corners by an engaged Ionic column. Large sash windows punctuate the south façades and, originally also the east and west ends of the two smaller wings. Today the exterior constitutes the only part of the structure that retains the Greek Revival details. The portico sports a thin two-banded architrave and above that a prominent yet severe frieze of triglyphs separated by bare metopes; an additional bay is allotted for the central intercolumniation. Heavy modillions with guttae adorn the raking cornice and pediment that crown this part of the structure.

== Modifications ==
In the mid-1890s the Cincinnati firm of Crapsey and Brown was retained by Madison County to make extensive alterations, which were previewed in The Inland Architect to cost some $15,000. Among other changes, the remodeling of the interior included the installation of an impressive bronze and marble double staircase inside the main vestibule that still provides access to the courtroom on the second level. It was probably about this time that the small porticoes on the ends of the east and west wings were removed and themselves replaced by large windows.

The last significant modifications to the courthouse were made in 1965, which filled in much of the space behind the original wings with a rather unsympathetic and architecturally insignificant expansion of the structure. The interior hallways were mostly covered over with large-plate ceramic tile and dropped ceilings were added. The courtroom has been repeatedly remodeled to accommodate more modern equipment and furnishings. On the exterior, a projecting bay of an added staircase partially hides the pediment and destroys the symmetry originally present on the north façade opposite the portico.
