= Madge Miller Green =

American educator and politician

- Born: April 19, 1900; Palestine, Illinois
- Died: December 11, 1989 (aged 89); Springfield, Illinois
- Education: Indiana State University

Ola Madge Miller Green (April 19, 1900 – December 11, 1989) was an American educator and politician.

Green was born in Palestine, Illinois and went to the Palestine public schools. She received her bachelor's and master's degrees in education from Indiana State University. She was a school teacher in Palestine, Illinois and in Richmond, Indiana. She wrote a textbook: Through the Years in Indiana that was used in the Indiana schools. Green was appointed to the Illinois Senate in 1962 succeeding her husband Herschel S. Green who died while still in office. Green then was elected to a full term and served until 1965. She was a Republican. Green then served as postmistress for the Illinois Senate. Green died at St. John's Hospital in Springfield, Illinois.
