= Swan Island Site =

Archaeological site in Illinois, United States

- U.S. National Register of Historic Places
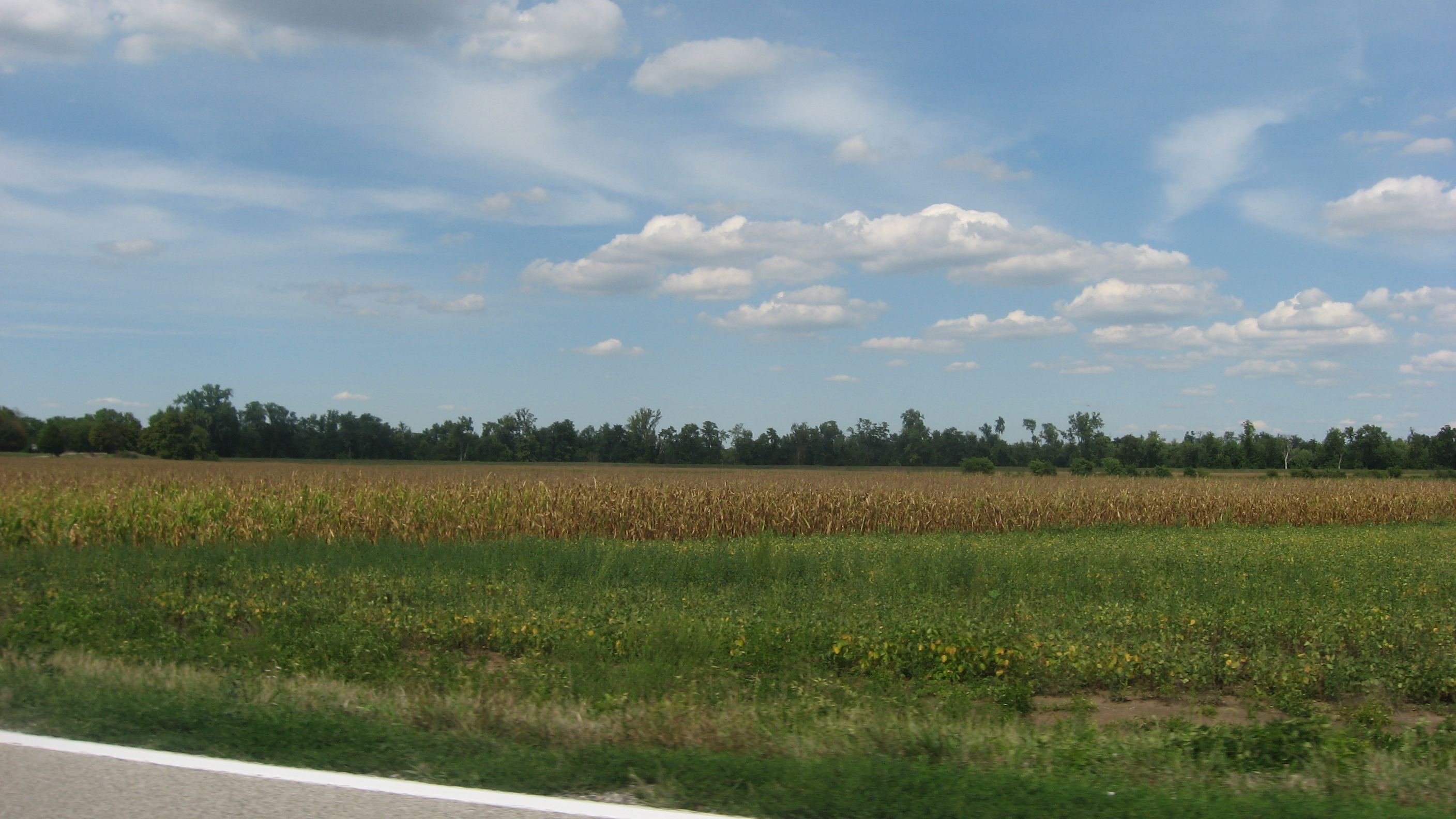
- Vicinity of the site; it lies in the treeline in the background

- Location within Illinois Location within the United States
- Location: Northern side of the junction of the Wabash River and the Crawford/Lawrence county line
- Nearest city: Palestine, Illinois
- Coordinates: 38°51′10″N 87°32′14″W
- Area: 3.5 acres (1.4 ha)
- NRHP reference No.: 78001142
- Added to NRHP: December 18, 1978

The Swan Island Site is an archaeological site in Crawford County, Illinois, located north of the point where the Wabash River crosses the Lawrence County line. The shell midden site, located on a sandstone ridge in the Wabash River flood plain, was inhabited by people of the Riverton culture in the Late Archaic period. As of 1978, it is one of three known sites associated with the culture, which lived in the central Wabash Valley and had distinct methods of making tools. Archaeologists first found the site in the 1950s, and Dr. Howard Winters of the Illinois State Museum began excavations there in 1961.

The site was added to the National Register of Historic Places on December 18, 1978. It is one of three archaeological sites on the National Register in Crawford County; the other two are the Riverton Site and the Stoner Site, the other two known Riverton culture sites as of 1978.

== See also ==
- List of archaeological sites on the National Register of Historic Places in Illinois
