= Living Arts and Science Center =

- Kinkead House
- U.S. National Register of Historic Places
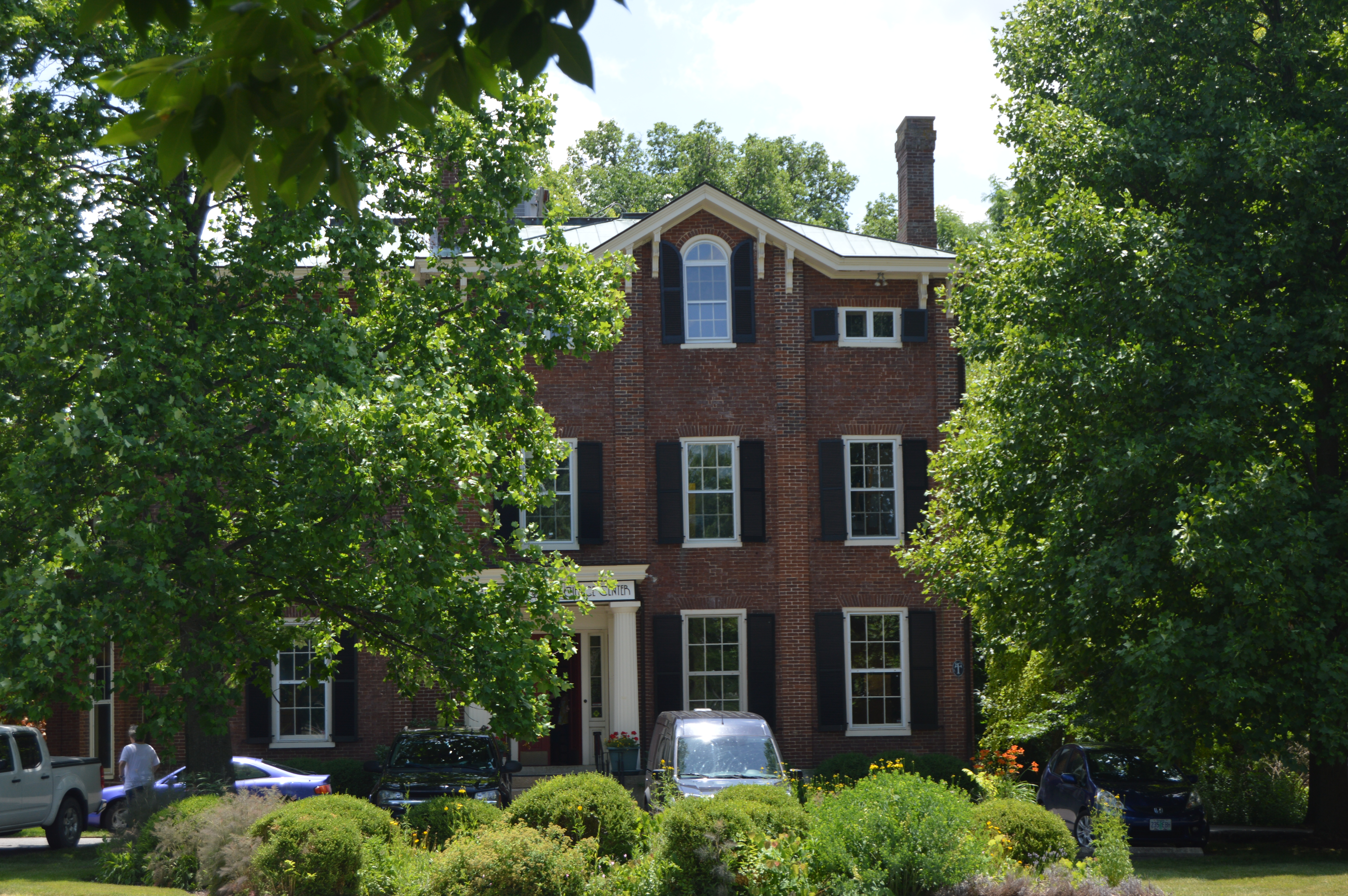

- Location within Kentucky Location within the United States
- Location: 362 Walnut St., Lexington, Kentucky
- Coordinates: 38°02′56″N 84°29′21″W
- Area: 1.1 acres (0.45 ha)
- Built: 1846
- Architect: Thomas Lewinski (likely)
- Architectural style: Greek Revival, Italianate, Queen Anne
- NRHP reference No.: 82002688
- Added to NRHP: June 29, 1982

The Living Arts & Science Center, formerly the George B. (Blackburn) Kinkead House, is an art and education center housed in an historic mansion in Lexington, Kentucky. The building is listed on the National Register of Historic Places. It was donated to the center by the Kinkead family in 1981.

The original two-story antebellum mansion is believed to have been designed by Major Thomas Lewinski, a British-born architect, engineer and teacher of foreign languages. It is a Greek revival style building, which was sympathetically enlarged during the Civil War period, with Italianate features. The dwelling was further enlarged c. 1853, with the construction of a third story attic.

== See also ==
- National Register of Historic Places listings in Fayette County, Kentucky
