= John B. Harper House =

Historic house in Illinois, United States

- U.S. National Register of Historic Places
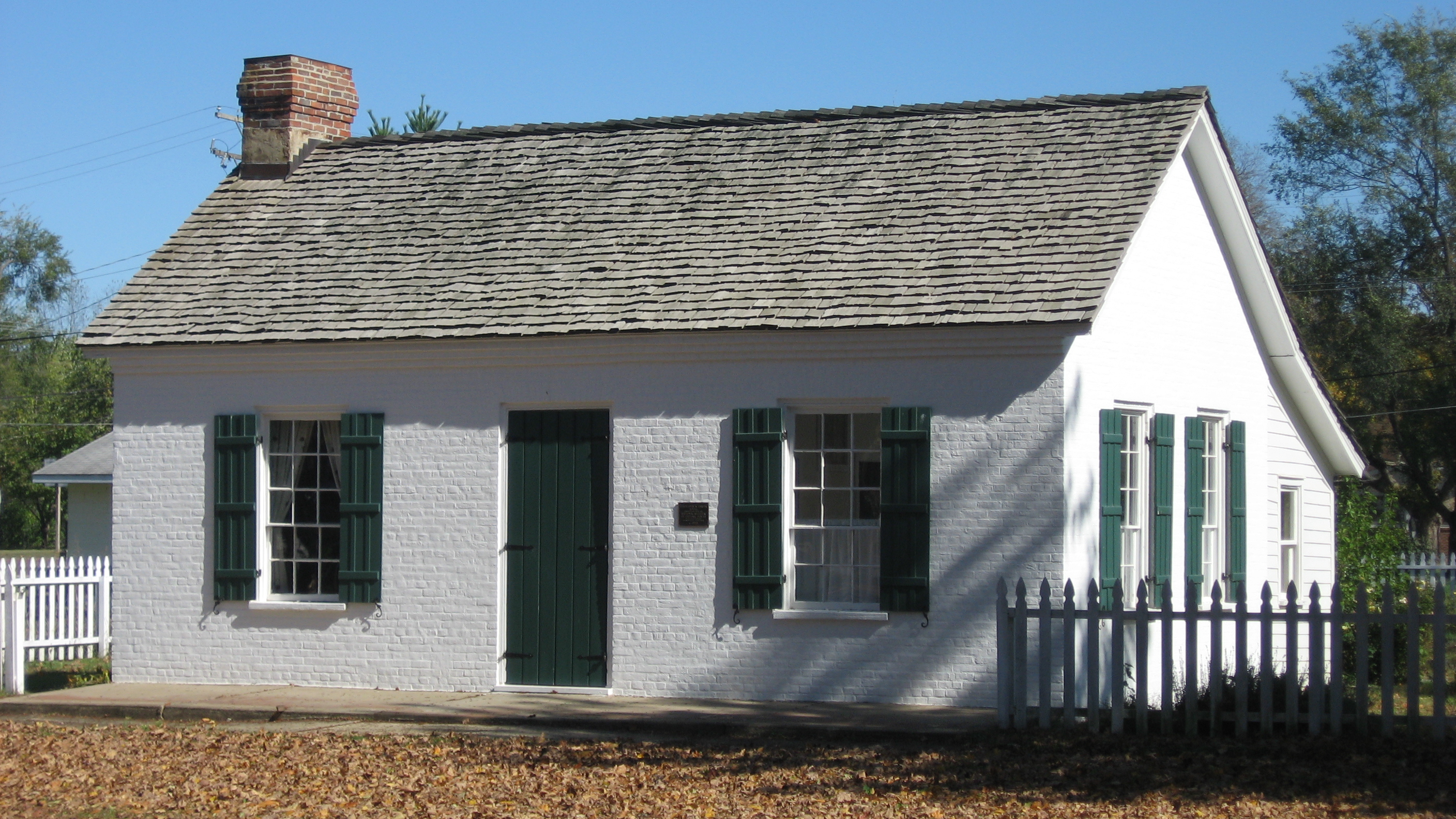
- Front and side of the house

- Location within Illinois Location within the United States
- Location: 102 N. Lincoln St., Palestine, Illinois
- Coordinates: 39°0′11.5″N 87°36′40″W
- Area: Less than 1 acre (0.40 ha)
- Architectural style: Hall and parlor
- NRHP reference No.: 03001199
- Added to NRHP: March 15, 2004

The John B. Harper House is a historic house located at 102 N. Lincoln St. in Palestine, Illinois, United States. The home was built circa 1833 and is one of the few remaining buildings from the early settlement of Palestine. The wood frame and brick house features a hall and parlor plan; frame extensions were later added to the back of the home. It was the home of John B. Harper, a blacksmith and farmer who also served as a Crawford County judge.

The house was added to the National Register of Historic Places on March 15, 2004.
