= Palestine Commercial Historic District =

Historic district in Illinois, United States

- U.S. National Register of Historic Places
- U.S. Historic district
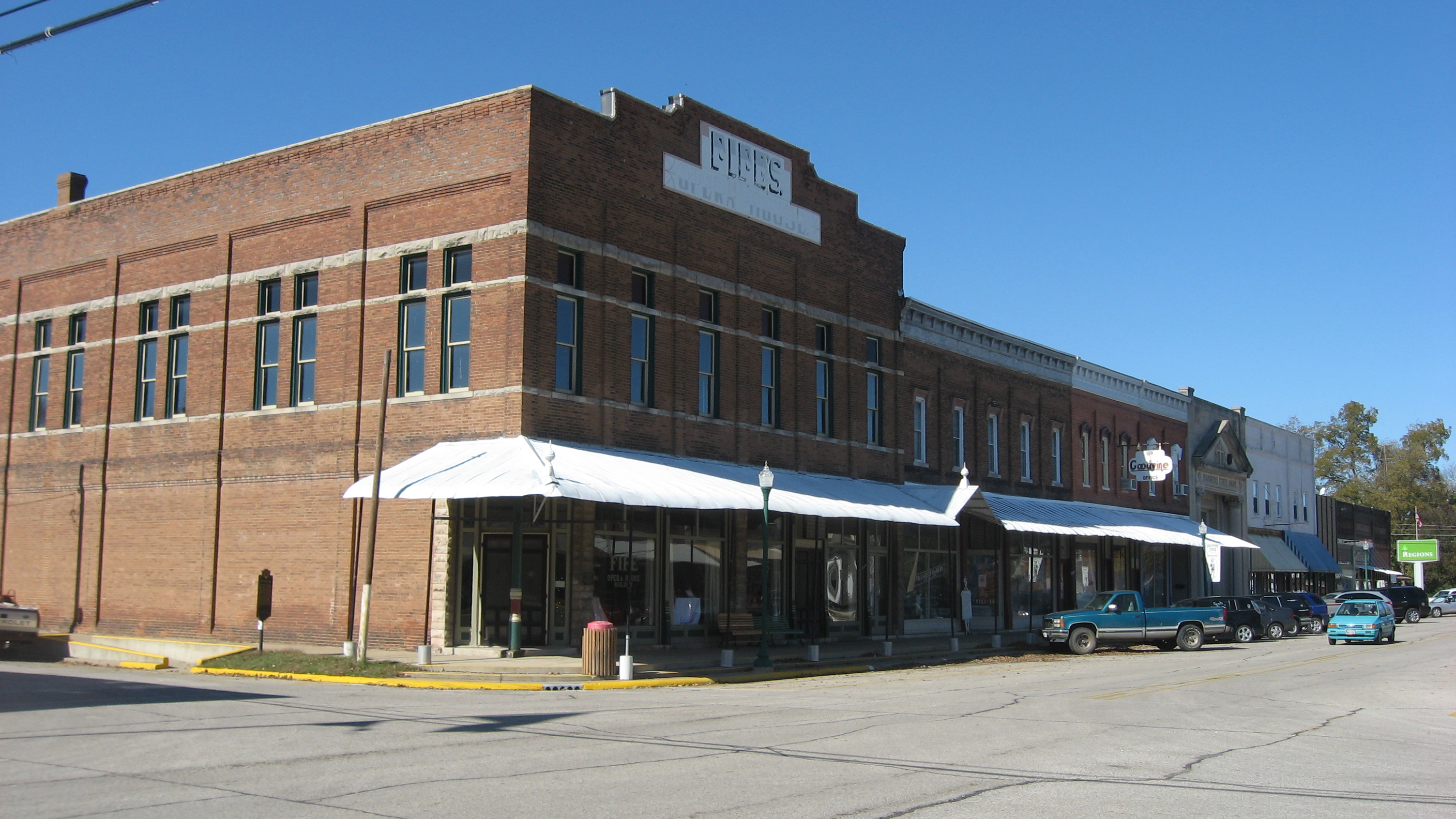
- The Fife Opera House

- Location within Illinois Location within the United States
- Location: 101-223 and 106-322 S. Main St., Palestine, Illinois
- Coordinates: 39°0′8″N 87°36′47″W
- Area: 8 acres (3.2 ha)
- Architect: John W. Ransom; Frank Corbin
- Architectural style: Late Victorian, Early Commercial, Classical Revival
- NRHP reference No.: 95000985
- Added to NRHP: August 4, 1995

The Palestine Commercial Historic District is a historic district in Palestine, Illinois. The district includes parts of the 100, 200 and 300 blocks of Main Street. 31 buildings, of which 25 are considered contributing buildings, are included in the district. Several of the businesses in the district feature metal facades manufactured by George L. Mesker & Co. The Fife Opera House, individually listed on the National Register, is located within the boundaries of the district. The district also includes Mary Ann Gogin's general store; Gogin was one of the first women in Illinois to own and operate a commercial business.

The district was added to the National Register of Historic Places in 1995.

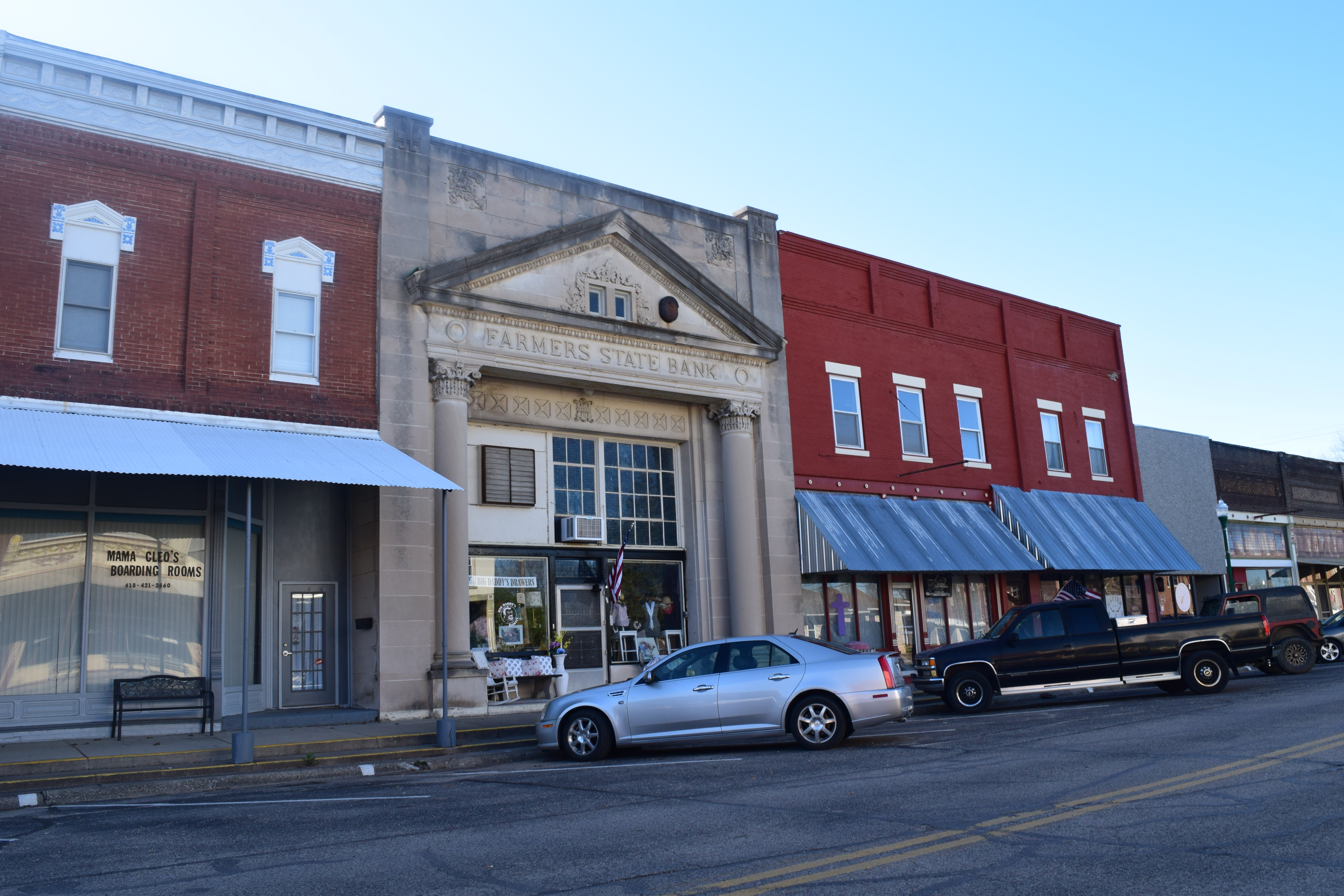
Farmers State Bank building
