= Glyndon Hotel =

Hotel in Richmond, Kentucky, United States

- Lobby (from 1930s era postcard)
- Interactive map of the Glyndon Hotel area

General information
- Location: 246 West Main St., Richmond, Kentucky, United States, 40475
- Coordinates: 37.748°N 84.29614°W
- Opening: 1892
- Glyndon Hotel
- U.S. Historic district – Contributing property
- Location within Kentucky Location within the United States
- Part of: Downtown Richmond Historic District (ID76000922)
- Added to NRHP: September 30, 1976

The Glyndon Hotel is a historic hotel in Richmond, Kentucky, United States.

== Overview ==
The Glyndon Hotel is Danish and means “Haven of Rest”. In its prime, the Glyndon Hotel was seen as a staple within Richmond Kentucky. However, it was a place very familiar to businessmen. People described the Glyndon Hotel as a place of community because of its extensive services. The Glyndon Hotel featured a barber shop, Tailor Shop, Drugstore, Tele-Graph Office, Office supply shop, and a newsstand that sold The Wall Street Journal. Regular single rooms without a private bath cost $2, doubles cost $3, and rooms with a private bath, $5 to $12. The Glyndon Hotel also housed many unique features such as a side entrance for women, a side porch for people to pass the time, nice dinners, and a ballroom.

After a fire destroyed the original hotel in 1891, the current four-story brick structure was erected on the foundation of the earlier one. The new hotel opened in the fall of 1892 under the management of George G. Corzelius (1864–1948).

Des Jardins and Hayward, a noted Cincinnati architectural firm, designed the existing edifice. The principal partner, Samuel E. Des Jardins, also designed four of Richmond's largest residences a few years earlier: the Pattie Field Clay House in 1883, Amberley in 1885, the Bennett House in 1885-90 and Elmwood in 1887.

== First Glyndon Hotel ==
The original Glyndon Hotel was opened on September 20, 1889. The hotel was developed by Messrs C.D Chestnut, A.R. Burnam, Senator John Bennet, Dr. L.H. Blantou, Mr. J. Stone Walker, and Hon. W.B Smith but they were unable to complete the work of the hotel due to mortgage bonds falling short of $3,300 of completing the project. However, the company Hay Bros. chose Main and Third Street where the Green's Opera House was burned down in 1887 to continue the project and sourced the architects for the building. All the pressed bricks and woodwork were done in Richmond Kentucky. The original hotel was four stories of medieval architecture and pressed brick. The original Glyndon Hotel featured an office, a reading room, and 50 rooms in total. The first Glyndon Hotel also featured an open fireplace, gas lighting, a dining room that turned into a ballroom, and water that was sourced from the rear of the hotel. Guests came in horse and buggy or a horse-drawn carriage that ran from the train station to downtown Richmond Kentucky.

== Fire ==
The Glyndon Hotel caught on fire in May 1891. The fire was seen burning on the roof and the rear of the hotel. There was fear within the community that the fire might not reach an end because there was no water to put the fire out due to the fire blocking access to water within the hotel and the houses near the Glyndon Hotel were very dry. The fire went on for 3 hours before it was under control. The Winchester Fire Department eventually came and put out the fire. Multiple businesses were displaced such as The Western Union Operator, The Collins Furniture Company, F. Weckesser & Co., etc. The total loss for the hotel was $80,000, the original contract with extras for the hotel was nearly $40,000. The hotel was under the management of J.B Willis & Co. and Hay Bros., which had insurance of $6,400 which was not enough to secure the property.

== Second Glyndon Hotel ==
The Glyndon Hotel was rebuilt in 1891. After the fire, the Hotel added some updates such as a side entrance for women, a long porch, and more rooms. The front four-story facade has four bays. Round arches cap the grouped windows on the fourth story. Below, a three-story projection with balconies on each level emphasizes the asymmetrically placed main entrances. White trim consists of latticed balcony railing, Tuscan columns, and window details. Large arches continue the rounded detailing of the exterior into the interior and connect the entrance to the lobby. The Glyndon Hotel also became home to original art, Bert Mullins created a painting of Daniel Boone specifically for the hotel. The hotel also kept a lot of its amenities as the street the hotel sat on was also home to many community staples as it was set next to Cornett Drugs and Boggs Barbershop. The Glyndon Hotel also kept its lavish dinners. During their special Sunday dinner in 1926 food included: Assorted olives, tuna fish canapes, barbequed spring lamb, baked young goose dressing, roast prime ribs of beef, and more. The dining room operated from the hotel's opening until 1965.

== Previous owners ==
Howard Colyer managed the Glyndon Hotel from 1939 to 1974. Colyer moved from South Carolina to manage the hotel in the late 1930s for his uncle T.H. Collins. Later, the hotel was sold to a local man. The Glyndon Hotel as well as other properties were sold to George Tye Baker in 1974. George Tye Baker was a real estate investor and retail merchant. The hotel was sold by Elizabeth Collins, the hotel was owned by her family for over half a century. Other properties were sold to Baker such as the J.C Penney Building, Cato's U-Save Discount, the Glyndon Barber and Tailor shops, and the old location of Browne's Office Supply. The property was said to be managed by Mr. and Mrs. Wise. Mrs. Wise is the daughter of Mr. Baker and said she planned to still operate the hotel and its 60 rooms and restore its historical prominence.

== Visitors and events ==
The Glyndon Hotel is seen as a historic staple within the Richmond Kentucky Community because of its well-known visitors such as U.S. Vice President Alben Barkley, Clark Gable, Carole Lombard, Tom Mix, foreign leaders, and more. The hotel is also known for its extravagant events such as The Opening Ball which was put on by the floor committee which consisted of O.H Chenault, W.S Hume, E. T Burnam, Waller Bennett, G.W Phelps, G.W Bright, and H. L. Perry. Also, The Leap Year Ball was thrown by the ladies of Richmond. They also hosted a Banquet for a Fraternity from Central University where they were served Green Tea Turtle Soup, Coffee, Cheese and Crackers, Champagne, and more. In the year 1987 the inaugural "Yoo-hoo Bath" took place in the hallway of the Glyndon. The Yoo-hoo bath is given to the winner of the historic Noble Wendy Roman Baseball League. Teddy Marshall was the recipient of the bath. The bath was performed by other league members, Robert Bryant, J. Michael Levan, and James Barrett 'Little Pony' Cowan.

== Future plans ==
Rodney Davis plans to restore Glyndon Hotel with new renovations on the horizon, such as changing the first floor of the Hotel Back into a restaurant and making the hotel what it once was with more amenities, including a bar. Although the project has not gotten completely approved by the city, a feasibility study is in the works. On June 15, 2023, Richmond City Council approved a bid submitted by Wyland Ventures, which is a real estate company, and City Visions which is a consulting company. The $22,500 project will help the city and the owner with a feasibility study, but more details are needed to finalize the project.
