= Thomas Lewinski =

American architect

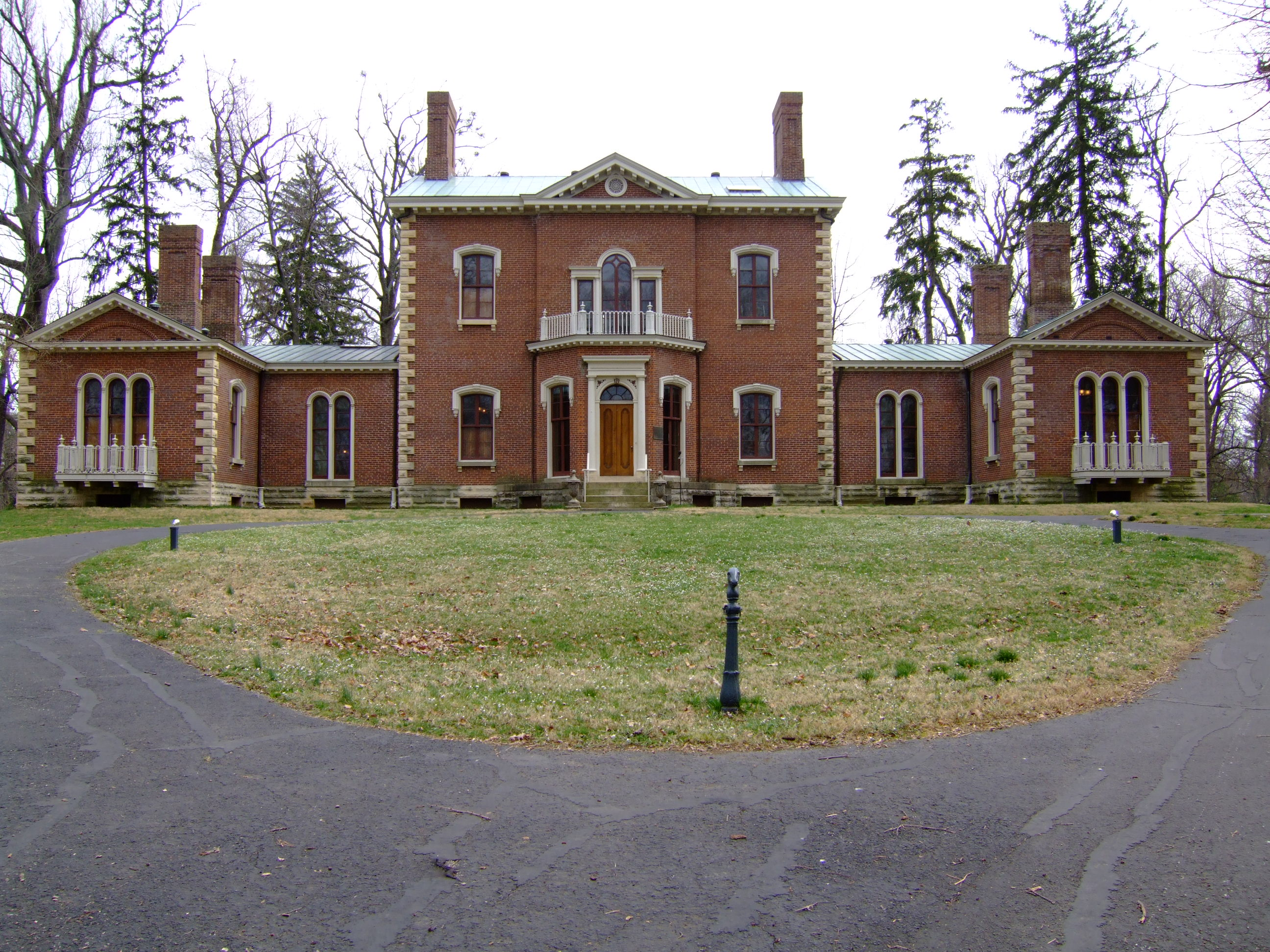
Ashland, the Henry Clay estate

Thomas Lewinski (abt. 1800—September 18, 1882) was an architect in Kentucky, United States. Born in England, he immigrated to the United States. For his work at Allenhurst and elsewhere, Lewinski was known in his day as one of the leading architects of the Greek Revival style. He designed many architecturally significant buildings that survive and are listed on the United States National Register of Historic Places.

== Early life and education ==
Lewinski trained for the Catholic priesthood and later studied architecture in England and emigrated to the United States before 1838 when he is listed as an instructor in language at the University of Louisville. He moved to Lexington, Kentucky in 1842 to begin his architectural practice.

== Career ==
Lewinski was active as an architect in the nineteenth century, particularly in his Greek Revival designs of plantation houses, elite residences, schools, churches and public buildings in and near Lexington, Kentucky. It was the prominent, wealthy city of the Bluegrass Region of Central Kentucky.

Works include:

- Allenhurst, Cane Run Pike west of Georgetown, Kentucky, (NRHP-listed with credit to Lewinski, Thomas); built 1850.
- Ashland, 2 mi. southeast of Lexington on Richmond Rd., Lexington, Kentucky (NRHP-listed with credit to Lewinski, Thomas)
- James Burnie Beck House, 209 E. High St., Lexington, Kentucky (NRHP-listed with credit to Lewinski, Thomas)
- Bell Place, Sayre Ave., Lexington, Kentucky (NRHP-listed with credit to Lewinski, Thomas and Stewart, William)
- Christ Church Episcopal, Church and Market streets, Lexington, Kentucky (NRHP-listed with credit to Lewinski, Thomas)
- Elmwood (property located on State Route South 55), Springfield, Kentucky (NRHP-listed with credit to Lewinski, Maj. Thomas)
- Jacobs Hall, Kentucky School for the Deaf, S. 3rd St., Danville, Kentucky (NRHP-listed with credit to Lewinski, Thomas)
- Thomas January House, 437 W. 2nd St., Lexington, Kentucky (NRHP-listed with credit to Lewinski, Thomas)
- Kinkead House, 362 N. Martin Luther King Blvd., Lexington, Kentucky (NRHP-listed with credit to Lewinski, Thomas)
- Madison County Courthouse, Main St. between N. 1st and N. 2nd Sts., Richmond, Kentucky (NRHP-listed with credit to Lewinski, Major Thomas)
- Mansfield, Richmond Rd., Lexington, Kentucky (NRHP-listed with credit to Lewinski, Maj. Thomas)
- Sayre Female Institute, 194 N. Limestone St., Lexington, Kentucky (NRHP-listed with credit to Lewinski, Thomas)
- Vinewood, 4 mi. northeast of Winchester on U.S. 60, Winchester, Kentucky (NRHP-listed with credit to Lewinski, Major Thomas)
- Ward Hall, 1782 Frankfort Pike, Georgetown, Kentucky (NRHP-listed with credit to Lewinski, Thomas)
- Whitehall, 7 mi. north of Richmond on Clay Lane off U.S. 25, Richmond, Kentucky (NRHP-listed with credit to Lewinski, Thomas)
