= Downtown Richmond Historic District =

Historic district in Kentucky, United States

- U.S. National Register of Historic Places
- U.S. Historic district
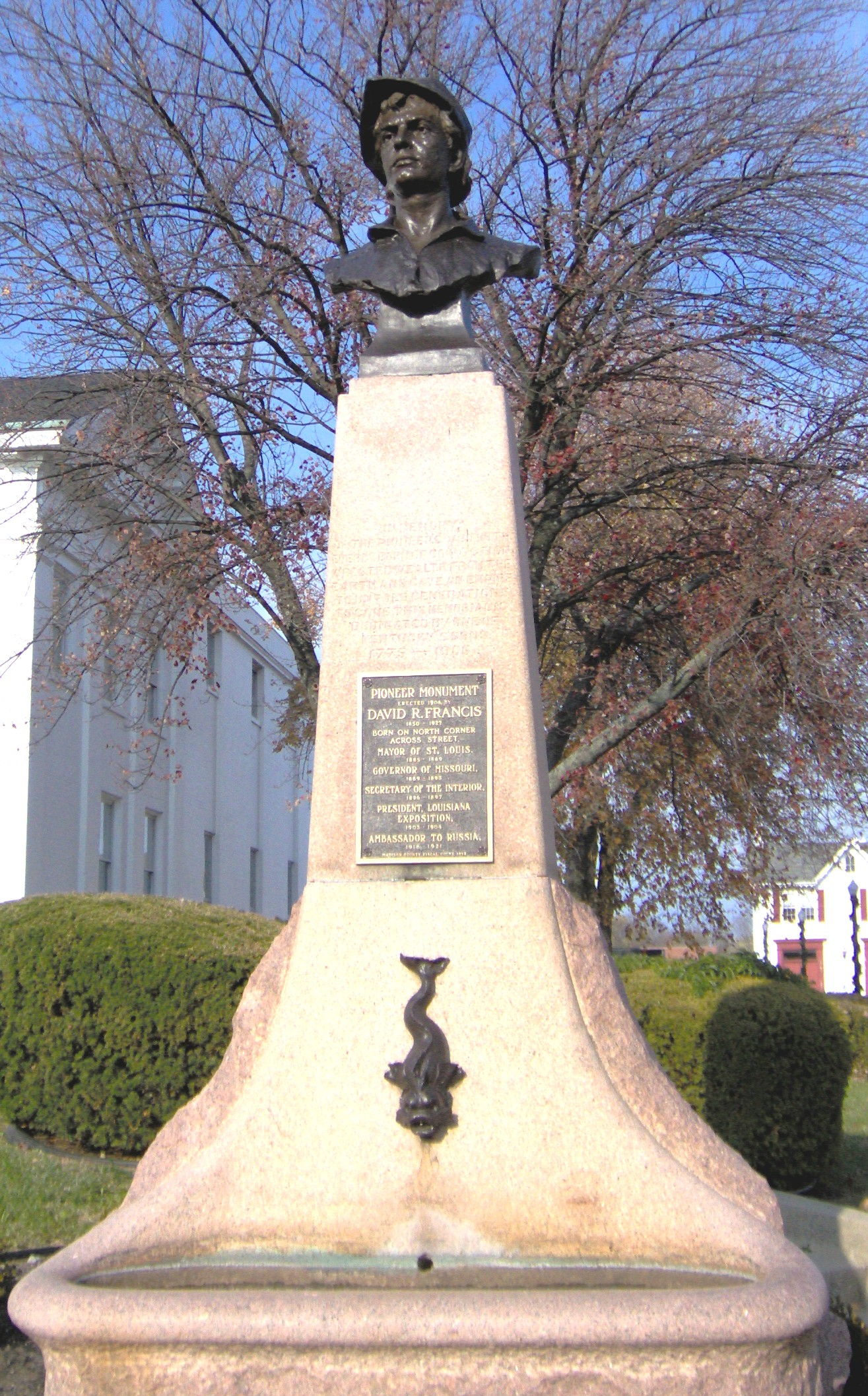
- Pioneer Monument in front of the County Court House

- Location within Kentucky Location within the United States
- Location: Main St. and Courthouse Sq., Richmond, Kentucky
- Coordinates: 37°44′52″N 84°17′43″W
- Area: 15.5 acres (6.3 ha)
- Architectural style: Late 19th and 20th Century Revivals, Late Victorian
- NRHP reference No.: 76000922
- Added to NRHP: September 30, 1976

The Downtown Richmond Historic District in Richmond, Kentucky is a 15.5 acres (6.3 ha) historic district which was listed on the National Register of Historic Places in 1976.

It includes the Madison County Courthouse, a post office, a city hall, a fire station, a bank and other buildings among its 60 contributing buildings.

It includes the Glyndon Hotel (1891), a four-story brick building.
