= Herschel S. Green =

American lawyer and politician

Herschel S. Green (December 28, 1897 – April 1, 1962) was an American lawyer and politician.

Green was born on a farm near Hutsonville, Illinois. He went to the Crawford County, Illinois public schools. He served in the United States Navy during World War I. Green received his bachelor's and law degrees from University of Illinois. Green was admitted to the Illinois and Michigan bars. Herschel lived with his wife Madge Miller Green and their family in Palestine, Illinois. Green served in the Illinois House of Representatives from 1947 to 1957 and in the Illinois Senate from 1957 until his death in 1962. Green died from a heart attack at the Crawford Memorial Hospital in Robinson, Illinois. His wife Madge Miller Green also served in the Illinois General Assembly.
