= Riverton Site =

Archaeological site in Illinois, United States

- U.S. National Register of Historic Places
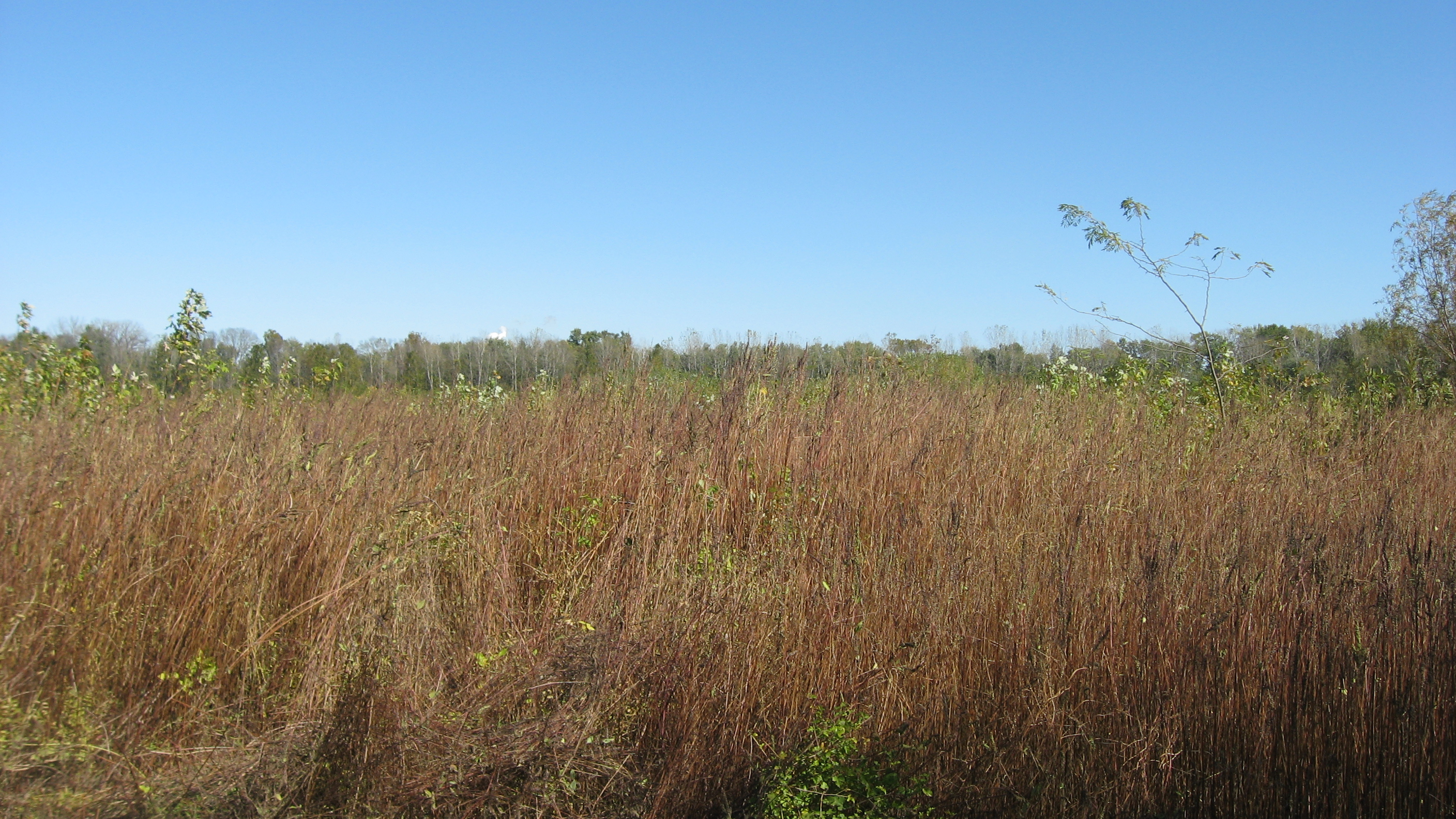
- Fields at the site

- Location within Illinois Location within the United States
- Location: Northern side of 1150th Avenue immediately west of the Wabash River, northeast of Palestine
- Nearest city: Palestine, Illinois
- Coordinates: 39°1′18″N 87°34′32″W
- NRHP reference No.: 78001141
- Added to NRHP: December 18, 1978

The Riverton Site is an archaeological site located immediately west of the Wabash River and northeast of Palestine, Illinois. The site, which dates from the Late Archaic period (3000-1000 BCE), is the type site of the Riverton culture. The Riverton culture, of which only three known sites had been discovered as of 1978, inhabited the central Wabash Valley and had distinct methods of making tools. The remains at the Riverton site can be separated into two areas: a manufacturing area with pits and a significant number of discarded tools, and a residential area with the clay floors of homes. The site was first noticed in the 1950s, and Dr. Frank Winters of the Illinois State Museum began excavations at the site in 1961.

The site was added to the National Register of Historic Places on December 18, 1978. It is one of three archaeological sites on the National Register in Crawford County; the other two sites, the Swan Island Site and the Stoner Site, were the other two known Riverton culture sites as of 1978.

== Early agriculture ==
The Eastern Agricultural Complex of the United States is one of about 10 places in the world where humans independently domesticated wild plants and initiated agriculture. The Riverton Site is one of the best known and earliest sites of extensive cultivation in the eastern U.S. By 1800 BCE, Native Americans were cultivating several different native plants at Riverton for food and containers. The cultivated plants were bottle gourd (Lagenaria siceraria), marshelder (Iva annua var. macrocarpa), sunflower (Helianthus annuus var. macrocarpus), and 2 cultivated varieties of chenopod (Chenopodium berlandieri), as well as the possible cultivation of squash (Cucurbita pepo) and little barley (Hordeum pusillum).

Ten house sites have been discovered at Riverton, indicating a population of 50 to 100 people in the community. Among the hearths and storage pits associated with the houses, archaeologists found a number of plant remains, including a large number of seeds of chenopods (goosefoot or lamb's quarters). Some of the chenopod seeds had husks only one third as thick as those of wild seeds. Riverton farmers had bred them selectively to produce a husk easier to remove from the edible seed than wild varieties of the same plant.

== See also ==
- List of archaeological sites on the National Register of Historic Places in Illinois
