= Allison-Lamotte culture =

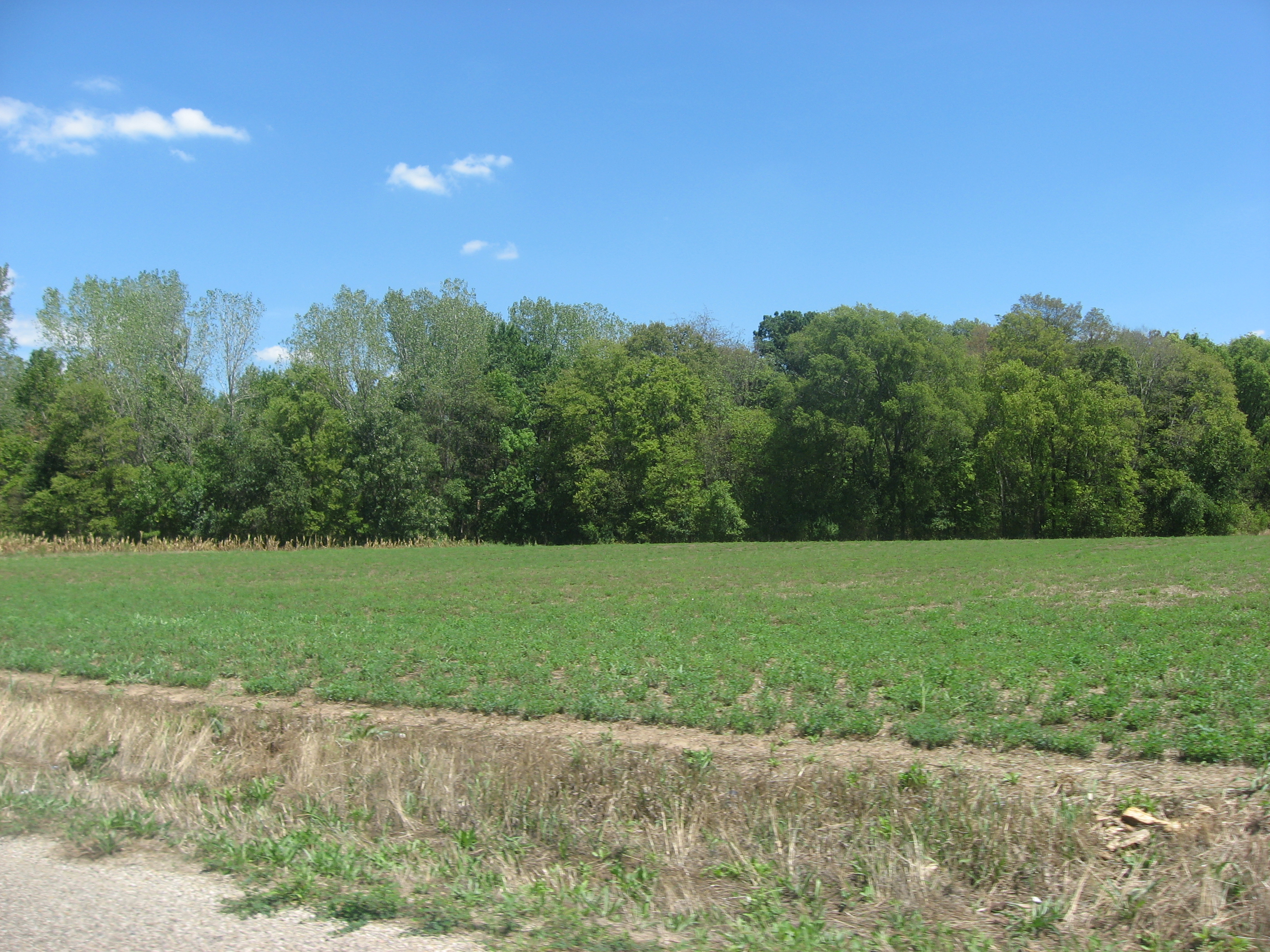
Overview of Stoner, one of the leading Allison-Lamotte sites

The Allison-Lamotte culture was an archaeological culture that inhabited the Wabash River valley in the United States during the later portion of the Woodland period. Flourishing approximately from AD 100 to 600, the culture's sites are common near the modern city of Vincennes, Indiana. First defined in 1963, the culture was originally described as being divided into two phases — Allison and LaMotte — although some later authors have taught a single unified phase.

== Characteristics ==
Allison-Lamotte sites are commonly located along the Wabash or its tributaries; they generally occupy land that was in prairie before white settlement of the region, and many are found near marshes. It was a moundbuilding culture, although unlike many other moundbuilding cultures of the period, its mounds were often not used for mortuary purposes. Many Allison-Lamotte villages featured a circular plan with a central plaza surrounded by circular houses. Judging by phenomena such as house sizes, it is believed that the society lacked a substantial class structure. Members of the culture hunted heavily, commonly preying on animals such as deer, turkeys, turtles, and shellfish; among their leading plant foods were hickory nuts and domesticated squash. The culture's pottery and lithic technology were typical of Late Woodland peoples; earlier generations of the culture seemingly produced cord-marked pottery and later generations are thought to have favored a process of stamping their pottery to produce rough edges, while Allison-Lamotte projectile points are of a form substantially identical to points found at nearby sites of other cultures, such as the Mann site. Similarities between Allison-Lamotte and contemporary surrounding cultures are so great that after more than fifteen years of active research, no clear boundaries could be drawn between it and its neighbors.

== Cultural center and relationships ==
One of the culture's most important sites is the Stoner Site, located in southeastern Illinois. Discovered in 1930, Stoner was intensively occupied by Allison-Lamotte peoples and lacks any evidence of substantial occupation by other peoples. Evidence from this and other sites appears to suggest that members of the culture highly valued lamellar flint knives. Robert Barth has proposed that the members of the culture eventually developed into the Vincennes phase of the Mississippian culture, which was contemporary with and would have maintained substantial relationships with inhabitants of the Angel site of far southwestern Indiana and the Kincaid site of far southern Illinois.
