= Vincennes phase =

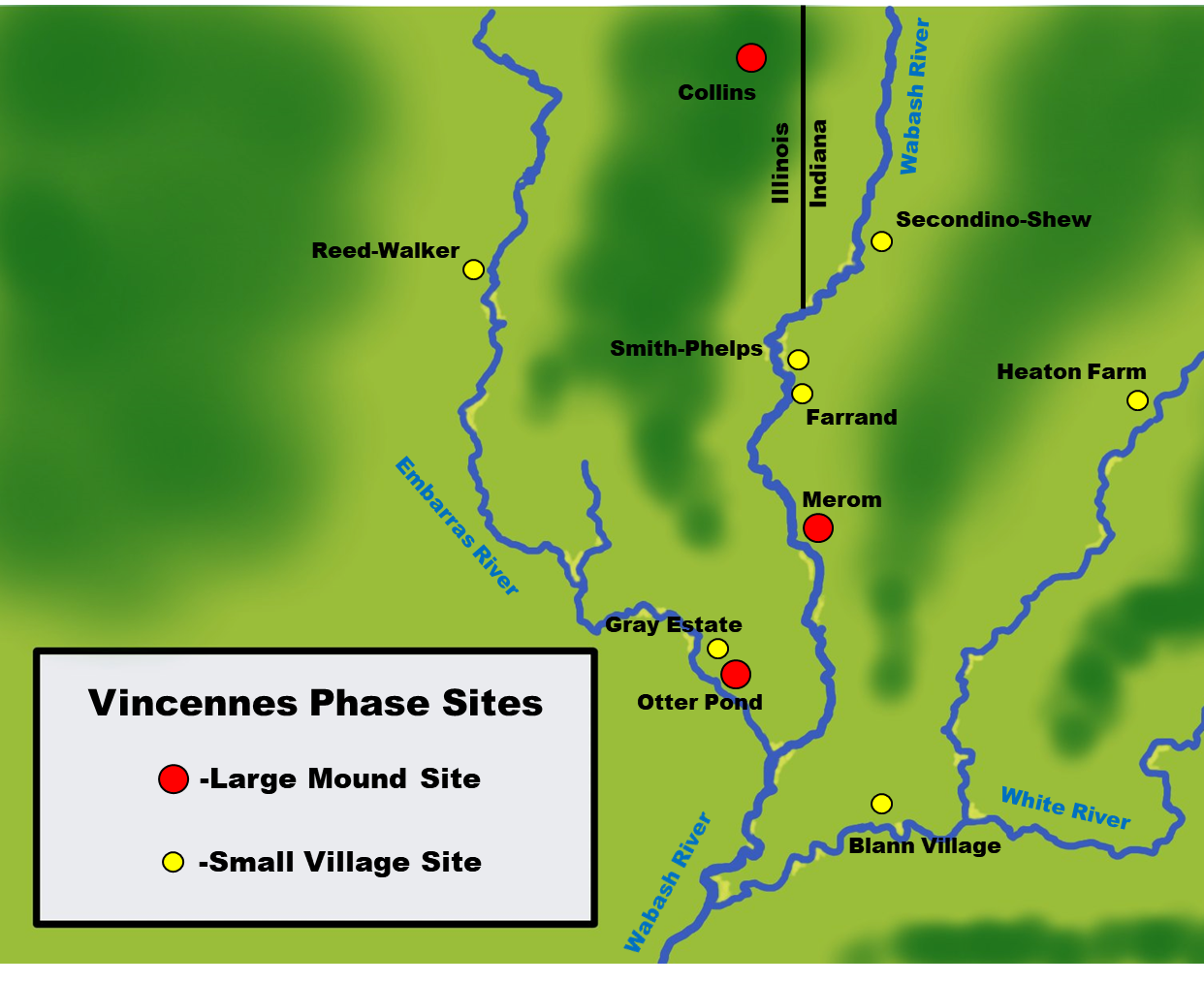
The Vincennes phase and sites associated with the tradition, including the Collins site

The Vincennes phase is a Mississippian culture phase dating from 1100 to 1350 CE. This poorly-understood phase occupied much of the Lower Wabash Valley in western Indiana and eastern Illinois. Robert Barth proposed that the Vincennes phase evolved from the Allison-Lamotte culture, however this is not universally agreed upon. The Vincennes phase people were agriculturalists, dependant on maize to sustain their population. They were a multi-ethnic people, composed of cultural traits from Middle Mississippian, Upper Mississippian, Fort Ancient, and Woodland cultures.

== Etchison complex ==
This complex is defined by strong relations with Cahokia, with a lack of the typical Vincennes ceramics found in the southern Vincennes area. The focal point of the complex is the Collins site, a multi-mound ceremonial center. This is the earliest Mississippian settlement in the region, and thought to stem from a Cahokian attempt to spread the Mississippian religion. Joshua Wells posits a conjoining of the Etchison Complex and Southern Vincennes cultural area as a hegemonic Vincennes phase.

== Settlement pattern ==
Vincennes phase towns and villages are usually located near a floodplain of a secondary river of the Wabash River. However, in some cases such as the Merom site, the settlement was located atop a hard to access bluff, presumably for defense. Large Vincennes phase sites contain central plazas surrounded by platform mounds and residential clusters.

=== North Vincennes ===
North Vincennes sites have a number of woodland components to them, namely Albee phase housing styles, ceramics, and lithics being commonplace in north Vincennes settlements. Villages seem to be disjointed from the ceremonial sites. Northern Vincennes sites:

- Secondino-Shew
- Smith-Phelps
- Farrand

=== South Vincennes ===
The Southern Vincennes cultural area is more reminiscent of Middle Mississippian communities, with Otter Pond being a large multi-mound ceremonial and residential center. Secondary settlements exist in a smaller form, seemingly subject to Otter Pond in some way. In short, this settlement pattern is suggestive of a chiefdom similar to those recorded by De Soto in the mid 16th century. Southern Vincennes sites:

- Otter Pond
- Gray's Pond
- Merom
- Blann Village
- Heaton Farm

== Material culture ==
The material culture of the Vincennes phase is unique for having influences from surrounding Woodland and Oliver phase cultures.

=== Ceramics ===
The Vincennes everted rim jar is a major pottery type of the Vincennes phase, representing 62% of all pottery recorded from Vincennes sites. Ceramics from Vincennes sites are often a hybrid, shell tempered Mississippian pottery being made in a Woodland Albee phase style. Grit tempered pottery is also present in Vincennes ceramic assemblages.

=== Lithics ===
By far the most prominent lithic type of the Vincennes phase is the Madison Triangular form. This exhibits an intensive use of the bow and arrow by the Vincennes people. Humpbacked knives and flint drills make up the rest of the Vincennes phase lithic assemblage. Chunky stones and human effigy figurines are also present in Vincennes sites, often as grave goods.

== Recent study ==
In 2019, Jacob Skousen of Illinois State University performed a magnatomentery survey on the Otter Pond site
