= Allenhurst (Scott County, Kentucky) =

Historic house in Kentucky, United States

- U.S. National Register of Historic Places
- Location within Kentucky Location within the United States
- Nearest city: Georgetown, Kentucky
- Coordinates: 38°11′31″N 84°36′55″W
- Built: 1850
- Architect: Thomas Lewinski
- Architectural style: Greek Revival
- NRHP reference No.: 73000829
- Added to NRHP: April 2, 1973

Allenhurst, also known as Oakland, is an historic site located in Scott County, Kentucky west of Georgetown on Cane Run Pike. The Greek Revival house, designed by Thomas Lewinski, was built in 1850. The property was added to the U.S. National Register of Historic Places on April 2, 1973.

== History ==
In 1837, William G. and Polly Craig acquired property west of Georgetown in Scott County, Kentucky from William Suggett, Polly's father. Craig was a Baptist minister and faculty member at Georgetown College. He constructed a Greek Revival mansion on the land in 1850 and called it Oakland.

According to local legend, as recounted by Ann Bolton in A History of Scott County as Told by Selected Buildings (1989), Craig called on his cousin to act as contractor for construction of the mansion. Newton Craig, superintendent of the Kentucky State Penitentiary, had the house built by convict labor. The superintendent earned $21,826 and the state $37,899 in the transaction.

H.C. Allen, known for developing the first American Aberdeen Angus cattle herd, purchased the property and renamed it Allenhurst.

== Architecture ==
Allenhurst was designed by Thomas Lewinski, known as one of the leading architects of the Greek Revival style. The exterior of the structure exhibits one of the most complete uses of the temple-style facade in Central Kentucky. The pillared house has a two-story high portico with four columns, and fluted Doric columns paired on each side of central entrance. The temple-style design features "triple windows set under stone lintels that are repeated even on the basement level."

A pillared smokehouse with a hipped roof is located north of the great house.
