= Ashland (Henry Clay estate) =

Historic house in Kentucky, United States

- U.S. National Register of Historic Places
- U.S. National Historic Landmark
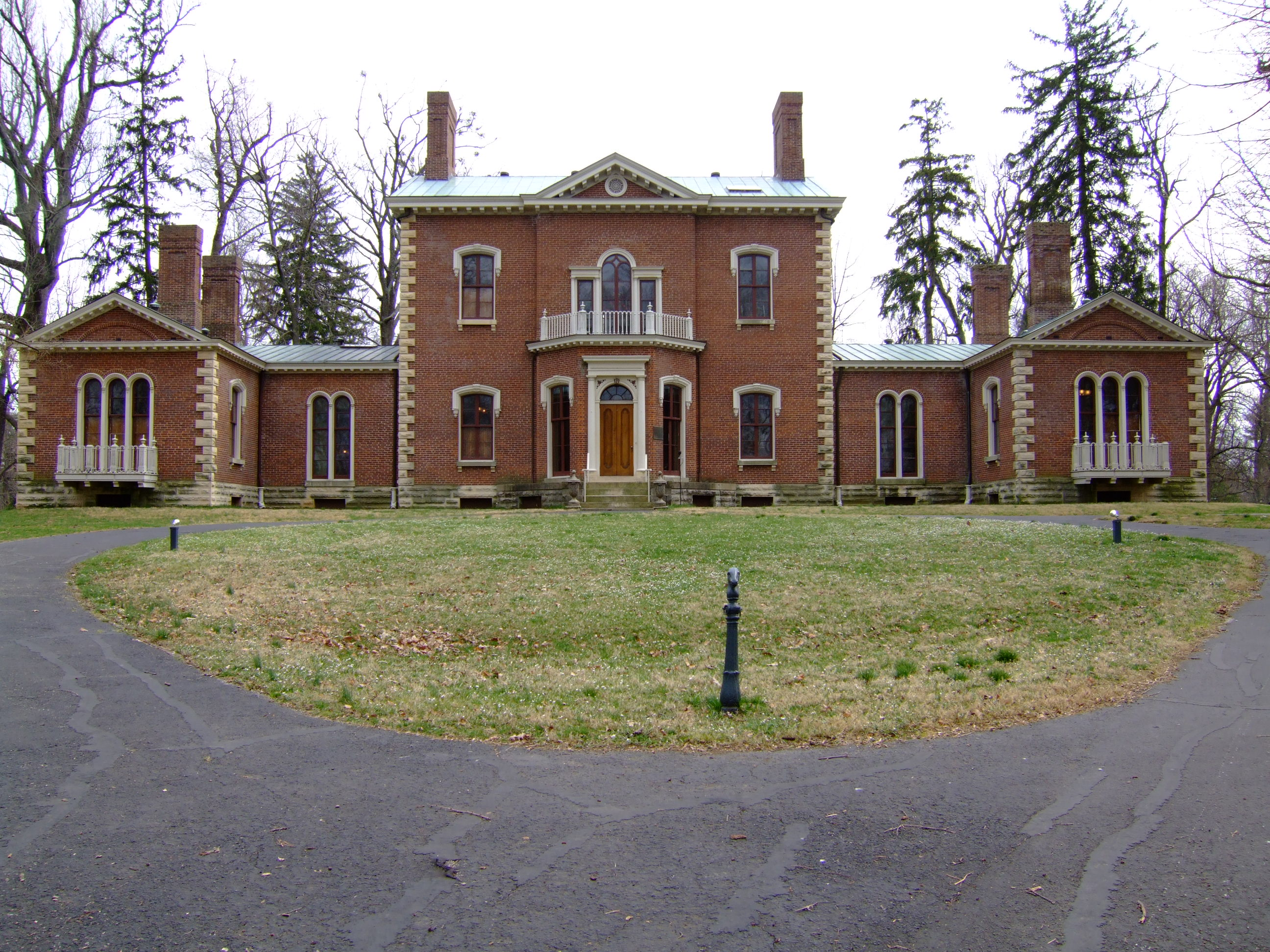
- The front of the house

- Location within Kentucky Location within the United States
- Location: 120 Sycamore Road Lexington, Kentucky
- Coordinates: 38°1′43″N 84°28′48″W
- Built: 1811
- Architect: Benjamin H. Latrobe; Thomas Lewinski
- Architectural style: Italianate
- NRHP reference No.: 66000357

Significant dates
- Added to NRHP: October 15, 1966
- Designated NHL: December 19, 1960

Ashland is the name of the plantation of the 19th-century Kentucky statesman Henry Clay, located in Lexington, Kentucky, in the central Bluegrass region of the state. The buildings were built by enslaved people who also grew and harvested hemp, farmed livestock, and cooked and cleaned for the Clays.

Ashland is a registered National Historic Landmark. The Ashland Stakes, a Thoroughbred horse race at Keeneland Race Course that has run annually since the race course first opened in 1936, was named for the historically important estate.

== History of the estate ==
Henry Clay came to Lexington, Kentucky from Virginia in 1797. In 1804, he began buying land for the plantation outside the city's limits. He eventually became a major planter who enslaved 60 people and owned over 600 acres (240 ha).

Among the enslaved people were Aaron Dupuy and Charlotte Dupuy as well as their children Charles and Mary Ann Dupuy. Clay took them with him to Washington D.C. when his congressional term began in 1810, and they were held there for nearly two decades. In 1829, 28 years before the more famous Dred Scott challenge, Charlotte Dupuy sued Henry Clay for her freedom and that of her two children in Washington D.C. circuit court. She was ordered to stay in Washington while the court case proceeded, and lived there for 18 months, working for Martin Van Buren, the next Secretary of State. Clay took her husband Aaron Dupuy and her children Charles and Mary Ann Dupuy with him when he returned to Ashland. The court ruled against Dupuy, and when she refused to return voluntarily to Kentucky, Clay had her arrested. Clay had Dupuy renditioned to New Orleans and had her held by his daughter and son-in-law, where she was enslaved for another decade. Finally, in 1840, Clay freed Charlotte and her daughter Mary Ann Dupuy, and in 1844, he freed her son Charles Dupuy.

== The mansion ==
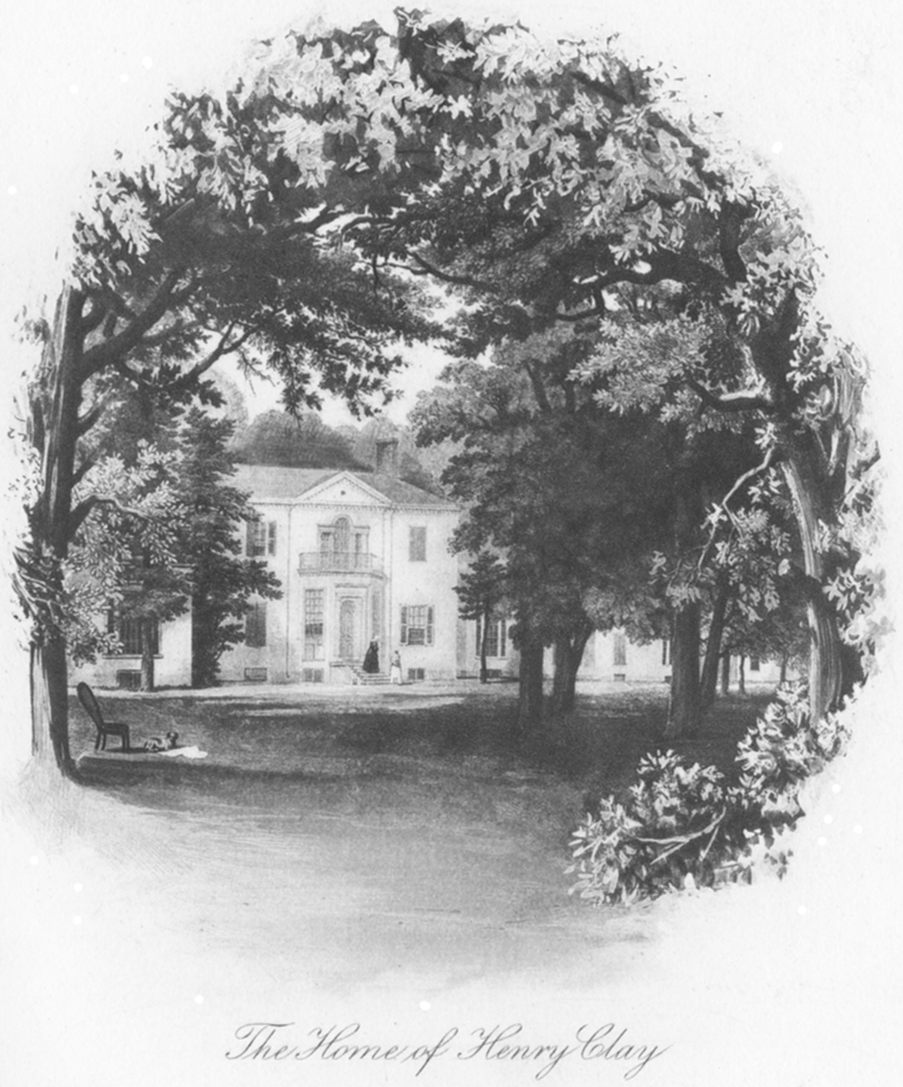
A vignette of the estate

Using the profits of his forced-labor farming, Henry Clay used enslaved people to build his Federal style house in around 1806 (see Federal architecture). He had two wings added between 1811 and 1814, designed for him by Benjamin Latrobe. Inferior building materials, particularly a porous type of brick, resulted in an unstable structure. The building was likely damaged in the New Madrid earthquake and aftershocks of 1811–12. Clay's many repairs could never completely stabilize the house.

== Later ownership ==
Clay divided the Ashland estate among three sons. After his father's death, son James Brown Clay owned and occupied Ashland and a surrounding tract of about 325 acres (132 ha). James Clay had the house razed in 1854, and rebuilding was completed by 1857. Local architect Thomas Lewinski designed the new structure, which used features of the original house: the footprint and foundation, floorplan, and massing, but Lewinski modernized the house stylistically. With many Italianate features, the resulting mansion is a mix of Federal architecture and Italianate details. Inside, James Clay employed Greek Revival features and decorated the home lavishly (see:Victorian decorative arts) with imported furnishings purchased in New York City. James Clay rebuilt the house and his family lived there until his death in 1864. His widow Susan Jacob Clay sold the estate in 1866.

Kentucky University purchased Ashland and used it as part of its campus. University founder and regent John Bryan Bowman occupied the mansion. The Agricultural and Mechanical College (Kentucky A & M) sat on Clay's former farm. During the Kentucky University period, Regent John Bowman used part of the mansion to house and display the University Natural History Museum.

Kentucky University split into what became Transylvania University and the University of Kentucky, and sold Ashland in 1882.

Henry Clay's granddaughter Anne Clay McDowell and her husband Henry Clay McDowell purchased the estate (consisting of about 325 acres (132 ha) and outbuildings) and moved in with their children in 1883. They remodeled and modernized the house, updating it with gas lighting (later, electricity), indoor plumbing, and telephone service. Their eldest daughter Nannette McDowell Bullock continued to occupy Ashland until her death in 1948. She founded the Henry Clay Memorial Foundation, which purchased and preserved Ashland. The historic house museum opened to the public in 1950.

== Name and namesakes ==
It is unclear whether Henry Clay named the plantation or retained a prior name, but he was referring to his estate as "Ashland" by 1809. The name derives from the ash forest that stood at the site. Clay and his family lived at Ashland from approximately 1806 until his death in 1852 (his widow Lucretia Clay moved out in 1854). His political career led Clay to spend most of the years between 1810 and 1829 in Washington, D.C.

There are several locations around the United States named after Ashland: the city of Ashland, Kentucky; the city of Ashland, Missouri; the city of Ashland, Ohio; the city of Ashland, Oregon; the borough of Ashland, Pennsylvania; the town of Ashland, Virginia; and the city of Ashland, Wisconsin. Two counties—Ashland County, Ohio, and Ashland County, Wisconsin—are also named in honor of the estate.

== See also ==
- Ashland Park
- Henry Clay's Law Office
- National Register of Historic Places listings in Fayette County, Kentucky
