= Chevy Chase, Lexington, Kentucky =

Chevy Chase
- Neighborhood of Lexington, Kentucky
- Interactive map of Chevy Chase
- Coordinates: 38.020°N 84.487°W
- Country: United States
- State: Kentucky
- County: Fayette
- City: Lexington

Area
  - Total: .258 sq mi (0.67 km^{2})
  - Water: 0 sq mi (0.0 km^{2})

Population (2000)
  - Total: 1,026
  - Density: 3,973/sq mi (1,534/km^{2})
- Time zone: UTC-5 (Eastern (EST))
  - Summer (DST): UTC-4 (EDT)
- ZIP code: 40502
- Area code: 859

Chevy Chase is a neighborhood in southeastern Lexington, Kentucky, United States. Its boundaries are Cooper Drive to the south, Tates Creek Road to the west, Fontaine Road to the north, and Chinoe Road to the east.

== Name origin ==
Chevy Chase was named after a golf club in Maryland that the subdivision's founder, Henry Clay Simpson, joined while working in Washington, D.C., in the 1920s.

== Neighborhood statistics ==
- Area: 0.258 square miles (0.67 km^{2})
- Population: 1,026
- Population density: 3,973 people per square mile
- Median household income: $61,924
