= Robinson High School Auditorium-Gymnasium =

- Formerly listed on the U.S. National Register of Historic Places
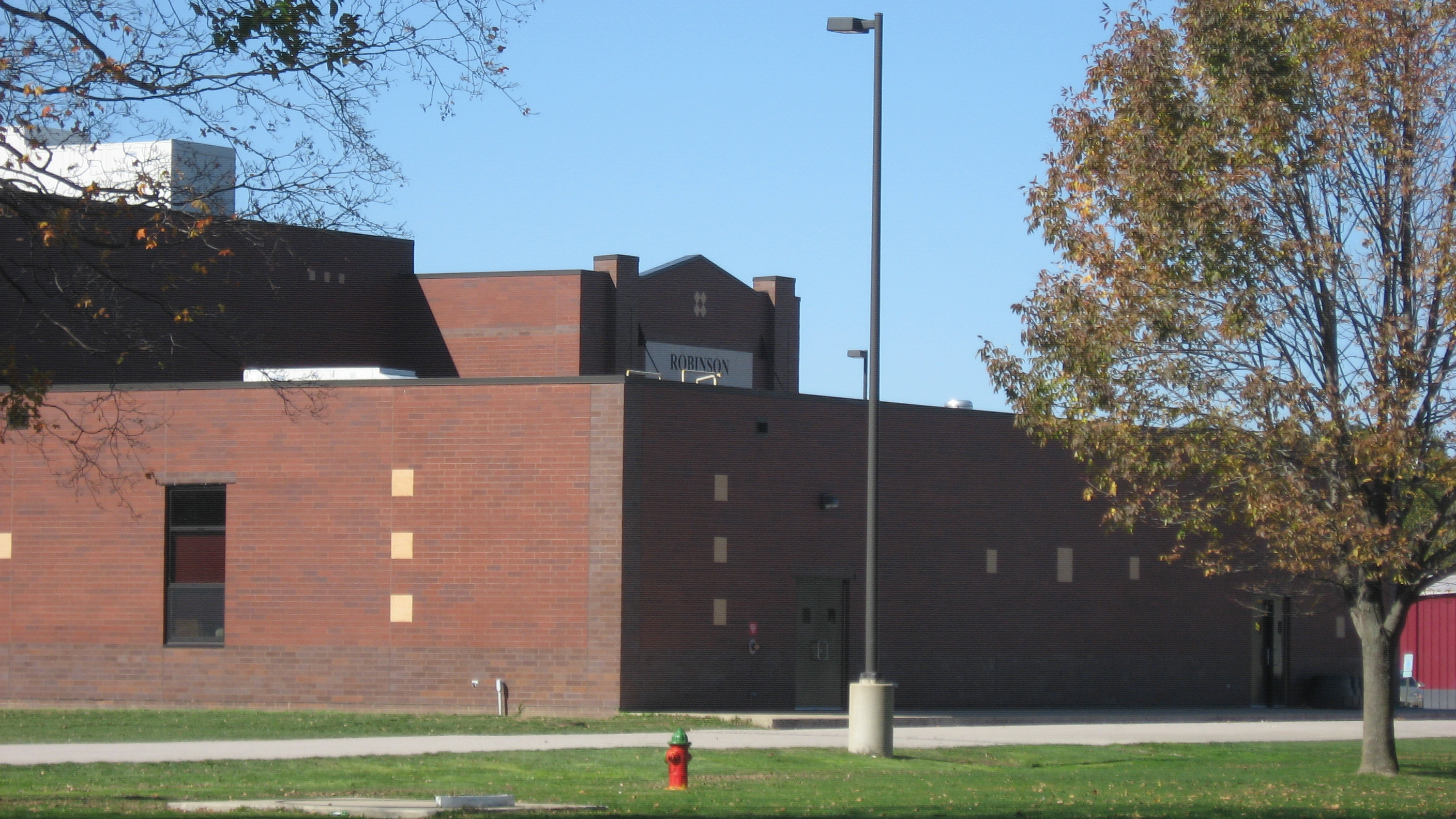
- Site of the auditorium/gymnasium

- Location within Illinois Location within the United States
- Location: 200 block of E. Highland Avenue, Robinson, Illinois
- Coordinates: 39°1′13″N 87°44′19″W
- Area: less than one acre
- Built: 1939
- Architect: Smith, Kranz & Strong; Rinehart Construction Co.
- Architectural style: Art Deco, Moderne
- NRHP reference No.: 05000434

Significant dates
- Added to NRHP: May 22, 2005
- Removed from NRHP: January 2, 2020

The Robinson High School Auditorium-Gymnasium, also known as the RHS Gym, was a historic gymnasium located on the campus of Robinson High School in Robinson, Illinois. The gym was constructed in 1939 using funds granted by the Public Works Administration. The Art Deco building featured fluted columns around its entrance, glass-block windows at the entrance and east and west sides, and curved metal awnings. Both high school athletic events and public events were held in the building, as Robinson had no other large public space suitable for hosting community events at the time.

The building was added to the National Register of Historic Places in 2005. The building was demolished after the construction of a new gymnasium in 2006. It was removed from the National Register in 2020.
