= Stoner Site =

Archaeological site in Illinois, US

- U.S. National Register of Historic Places
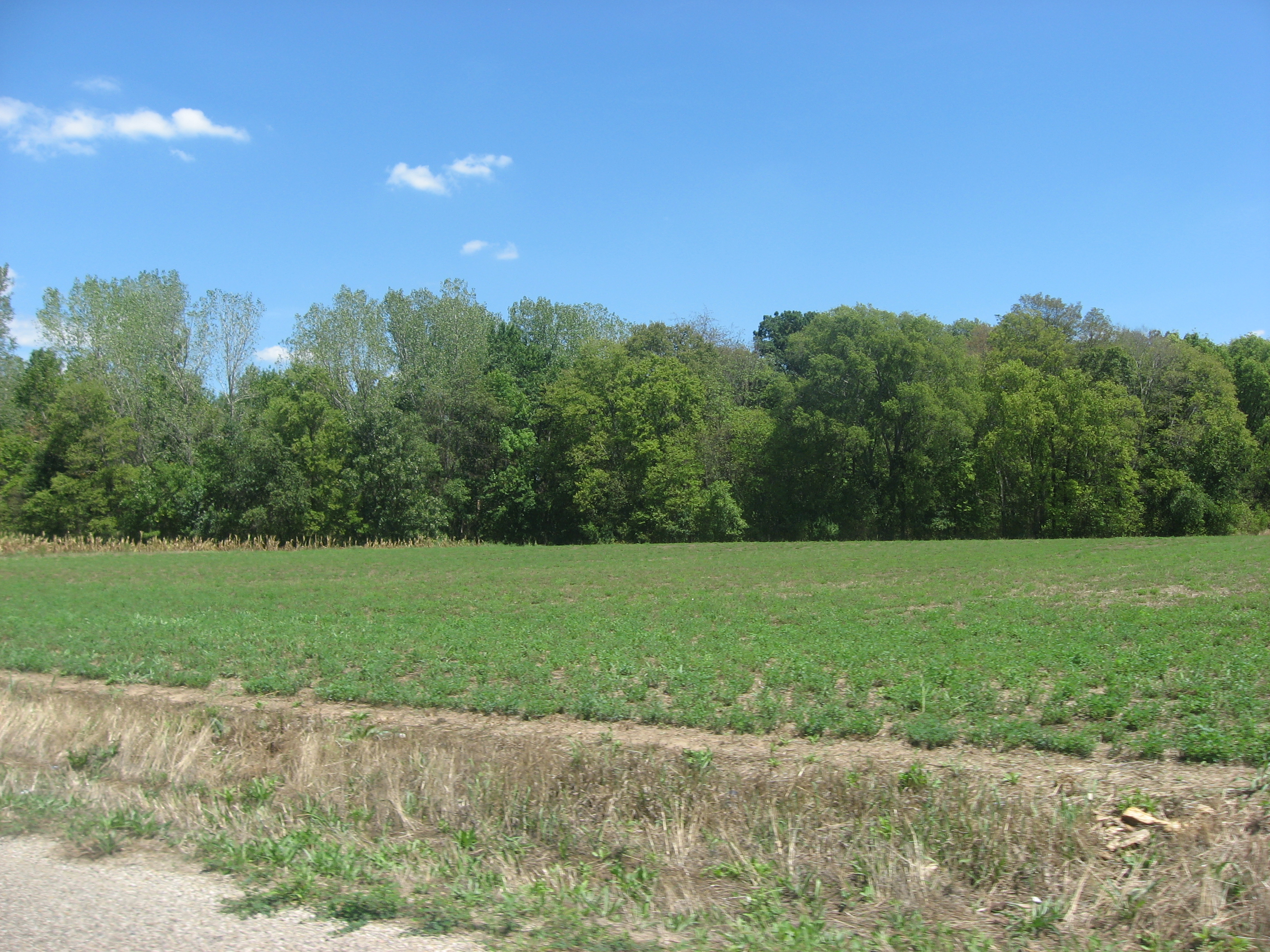
- Overview of the site

- Location within Illinois Location within the United States
- Location: Eastern side of 1550th Street between 1235th and 1300th Avenues
- Nearest city: Robinson, Illinois
- Coordinates: 39°2′18″N 87°39′20″W
- Area: 9 acres (3.6 ha)
- NRHP reference No.: 78001143
- Added to NRHP: December 18, 1978

The Stoner Site is a substantial archaeological site in the far eastern portion of the U.S. state of Illinois. Discovered during the Great Depression, the site has produced large numbers of artifacts from a prehistoric village that was once located there, and archaeological investigations have shown it to be one of the area's most important archaeological sites for the Allison-Lamotte culture. After more than a decade of fruitful research and predictions of potentially rich results from future work, it has been designated a historic site.

== Geology ==
Stoner lies in the middle of open fields several miles from the nearest community. Located near the Wabash River and about 4.5 miles (7.2 km) south of the village of Hutsonville, the site is situationed in rural eastern Crawford County. It lies in the floodplain of a small stream, Sugar Creek, which flows about 1 metre (39 in) below the site, approximately 180 metres (590 ft) to the northeast; the soil is largely clay, but due to the presence of the stream, much of the immediate vicinity is typically marshland. The surrounding countryside is the heavily glaciated prairies typical of much of Illinois, although before settlement the region straddled the boundary between the open plains to the west and the woodlands to the east. A gravel road traverses the fields a short distance west of the site. Its location in a prairie near marshland is common for sites of the culture that inhabited the village.

== Features ==
The predominant feature of the Stoner Site is a wide semicircular midden that is believed to have been the site of a prehistoric village. With a diameter of almost 450 feet (140 m) and a height of nearly 1 foot (0.30 m), the midden contains numerous postholes, but its most prominent feature is found at its northeastern corner: a substantial mound measuring 33 metres (108 ft) by 24 metres (79 ft) and approximately 1.5 metres (4 ft 11 in) high. Despite its prominent size, the mound has been greatly reduced since the middle of the 20th century; before that time, the site was covered by woods, but cultivation since that time has reduced the mound from its previous height of 2.4 metres (7 ft 10 in).

== Excavations ==
The Illinois Archaeological Survey first recorded the Stoner Site in 1930 and carried out a minimal field survey at the site, collecting materials that could be found at the surface. Aside from occasional reckless digging into the mound in the early 1950s by the owners, no further work of any sort was done for nearly thirty years. Local resident Denzil Stephens, an amateur archaeologist, conducted far more detailed work at the site starting in the late 1950s: besides investigating the mound, he excavated the surrounding field and discovered the midden and village site. By digging test pits at regular intervals and removing everything down to the subsoil, he demonstrated the existence of a village: by the early 1960s, he had revealed more than three hundred postholes and thus shown the complete outline of one house and portions of outlines for eleven other buildings. Stephens returned to the site once more in the late 1960s to test an area away from his previous excavations; this excavation's nearly complete absence of discoveries helped to demonstrate the site's boundaries.

Due to the cursory work done by the IAS field survey in the early 1930s, few artifacts from Stoner were known until Stephens began working at the site. His early excavations revealed unfamiliar types of pottery and hitherto-unknown forms of projectile points. As he returned to the site in the 1960s, he began to uncover plentiful cultural materials, including many projectile points identified as the work of the Allison-Lamotte culture, numerous stone tools (e.g. scrapers and celts, plus more than three hundred lamellar flint knives), gorgets, and projectile points strongly resembling those found at the Merom site in the nearby town of Merom, Indiana. Clay artifacts are also known at the site; the owners found pieces of pipes while digging around the mound, Stephens' excavations yielded more pipe pieces and one substantial clay figurine, and more than five thousand potsherds of various types have been recovered. Excavations yielded virtually no evidence of shellfish consumption by the inhabitants, which contrasts strongly with comparable nearby sites, such as the Daugherty-Monroe Site northwest of Merom.

== Conclusions ==
Stephens' unfamiliarity with the artifacts that he found in his early excavations led him to suggest that the village was populated by members of a previously unknown culture. His further work permitted the inhabitants to be identified as members of the Middle Woodland period Allison-Lamotte culture, which was first defined in 1963, and which flourished from around the birth of Christ until AD 400. The arrangement of the postholes enabled him to understand the site as a collection of circular houses (typically 22 feet (6.7 m) in diameter) partially encircling a central plaza. Later research demonstrated similar town planning at other Allison-Lamotte sites, and the placement of a mound near the midden has also been shown to be a common feature for Allison-Lamotte villages. Unlike many of the mounds built by other peoples of the Woodland period, Allison-Lamotte mounds were sometimes built for non-mortuary purposes; the owners' inability to find grave goods in the mound is comparable to the results of looting at many other mounds of the culture. Small elements of other cultures appear at Stoner; the Havana Hopewell left minimal artifacts, and the locally prominent Riverton culture of the earlier Archaic period was also present, but their artifacts are few and insignificant compared to those of the Allison-Lamotte period. Particularly rich is the collection of earthenware from the site, which is so comprehensive as to make it a potential type site for the culture's pottery.

As a well-preserved Allison-Lamotte village, Stoner is unusually valuable: it retains substantial evidence of that culture's occupation, and this evidence is unmixed with materials from other cultures. As a result, the Illinois Archaeological Survey deemed it the state's purest example of the culture, and two of its archaeologists predicted that future excavations would be able to gain crucial evidence of daily life from its richness and purity. Into the late 1970s, the distinctions between Allison-Lamotte and contemporary cultures elsewhere in the region were poorly known, so the IAS archaeologists suggested that excavations at Stoner would permit researchers to draw much clearer conclusions about the relationships between the different cultures living along the Middle Wabash in the Middle Woodland period.

In 1978, the Stoner Site was listed on the National Register of Historic Places because of its archaeological potential. It is one of three archaeological sites in Crawford County to be accorded this distinction, along with the Riverton Site (type site for the Riverton culture) and the Riverton-era clam shell midden known as the Swan Island Site.

== See also ==
- List of archaeological sites on the National Register of Historic Places in Illinois
