= Dr. Arthur W. Allen Home =

Historic house in Illinois, United States

- U.S. National Register of Historic Places
- Location within Illinois Location within the United States
- Location: 11266 North Trimble Rd., Robinson, Illinois
- Coordinates: 39°01′04″N 87°43′36″W
- Built: 1936
- Architectural style: Tudor Revival
- NRHP reference No.: 100005966
- Added to NRHP: December 30, 2020

The Dr. Arthur W. Allen Home, also known as Allenhurst, is a historic house at 11266 North Trimble Road in Robinson, Illinois. The house was built in 1936 for Dr. Arthur W. and Anna Allen. Arthur W. Allen was a physician and businessman who ran a local medical practice and sanatorium and was vice president of Robinson's Second National Bank. The couple designed their house in the Tudor Revival style, a choice inspired by their trips to Europe in the 1930s. The house's design includes a gabled entrance with a parapet, a gabled bay with a two-story window and multiple buttresses, and a complex roof with several dormers and three chimneys. The Tudor styling continues in the use of wood paneling and ceiling beams in the house's interior.

The house was added to the National Register of Historic Places on December 30, 2020.
