= Fife Opera House =

- U.S. National Register of Historic Places
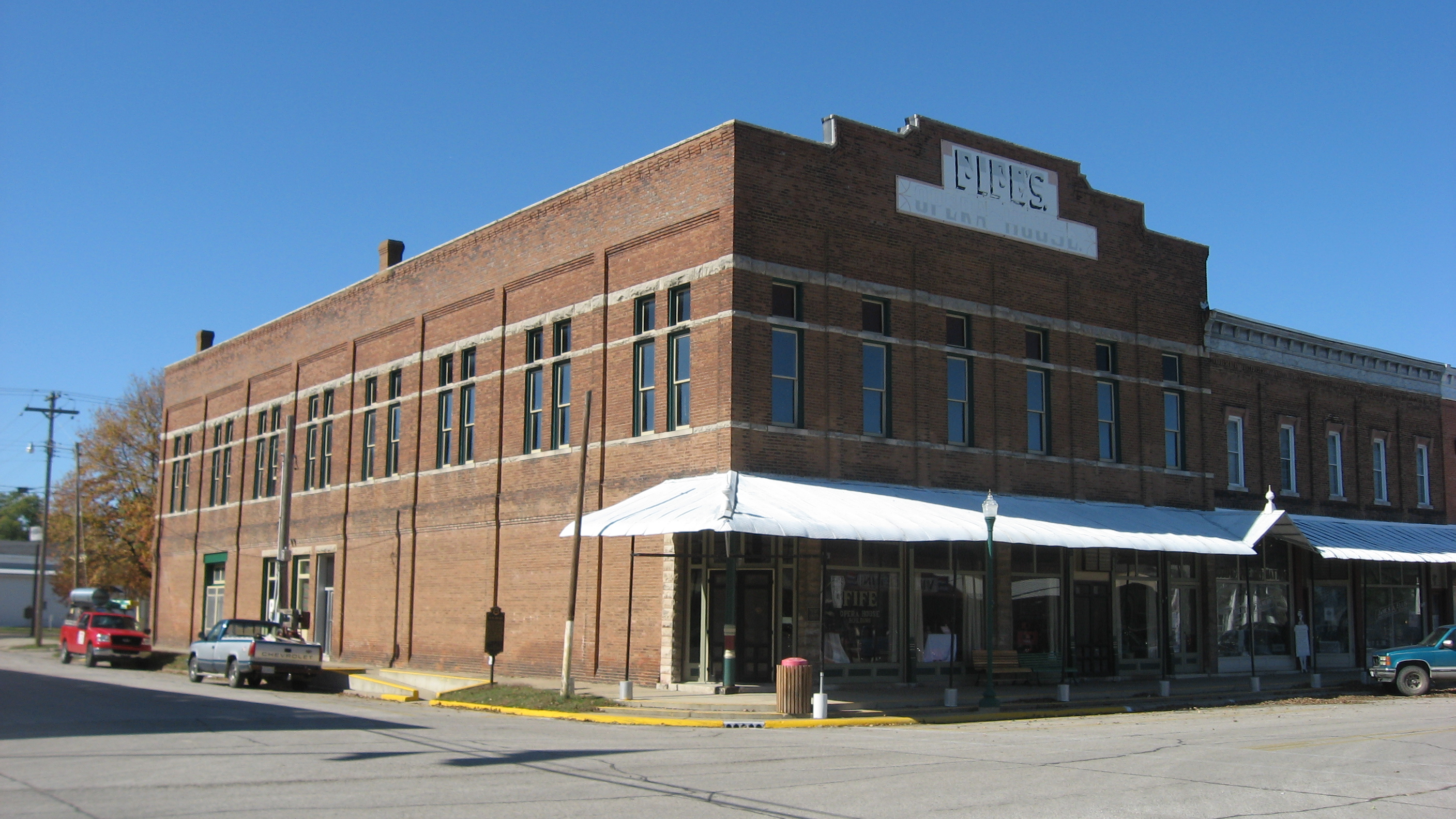
- Front and side of the opera house

- Location within Illinois Location within the United States
- Location: 123-125 S. Main St., Palestine, Illinois
- Coordinates: 39°0′8″N 87°36′48″W
- Area: Less than 1 acre (0.40 ha)
- Architectural style: Late 19th And Early 20th Century American Movements, Commercial Style
- NRHP reference No.: 89002348
- Added to NRHP: January 26, 1990

The Fife Opera House is a theater in Palestine, Illinois, in Crawford County. It is on the National Register of Historic Places and has been since January 26, 1990.

== History ==
Construction at the David Fife Opera House started in 1898 and finished in 1901. In the building David Fife operated a hardware store on the ground floor. Upon completion the opera house seated several hundred in a building that measured 55 X 70 feet (21 m). The raked floor was filled with upholstered, red leather theater seats. Audiences were cooled by electric fans in summer and heat provided by a coal furnace kept them warm in cooler weather. The two original ceiling fixtures included a mirrored collar which reflected the glow of the high wattage light bulbs. At the west end of the building is the stage with a 25-foot (7.6 m) long opening and 15-foot (4.6 m) high, the stage is encircled by 25 lights.

A handpainted rolled canvas fire curtain was hand painted by artists from Sosman and Landes, a Chicago company. The curtain art shows a Venetian canal scene. Side and top panels along the stage depict draperies surrounding a tree-lined river. Recently, other painted scenes showing gardens, waterfalls and a turn of the century scene have been discovered in the building. Fife's mother demanded that one of the building's five interior art panels, the one that featured cherubs, be painted over to cover their nakedness.

It is said the lights all over Palestine dimmed when Fife threw the switches to the lights at the opera house on opening night.
