= Palestine, Illinois =

Palestine
- Village
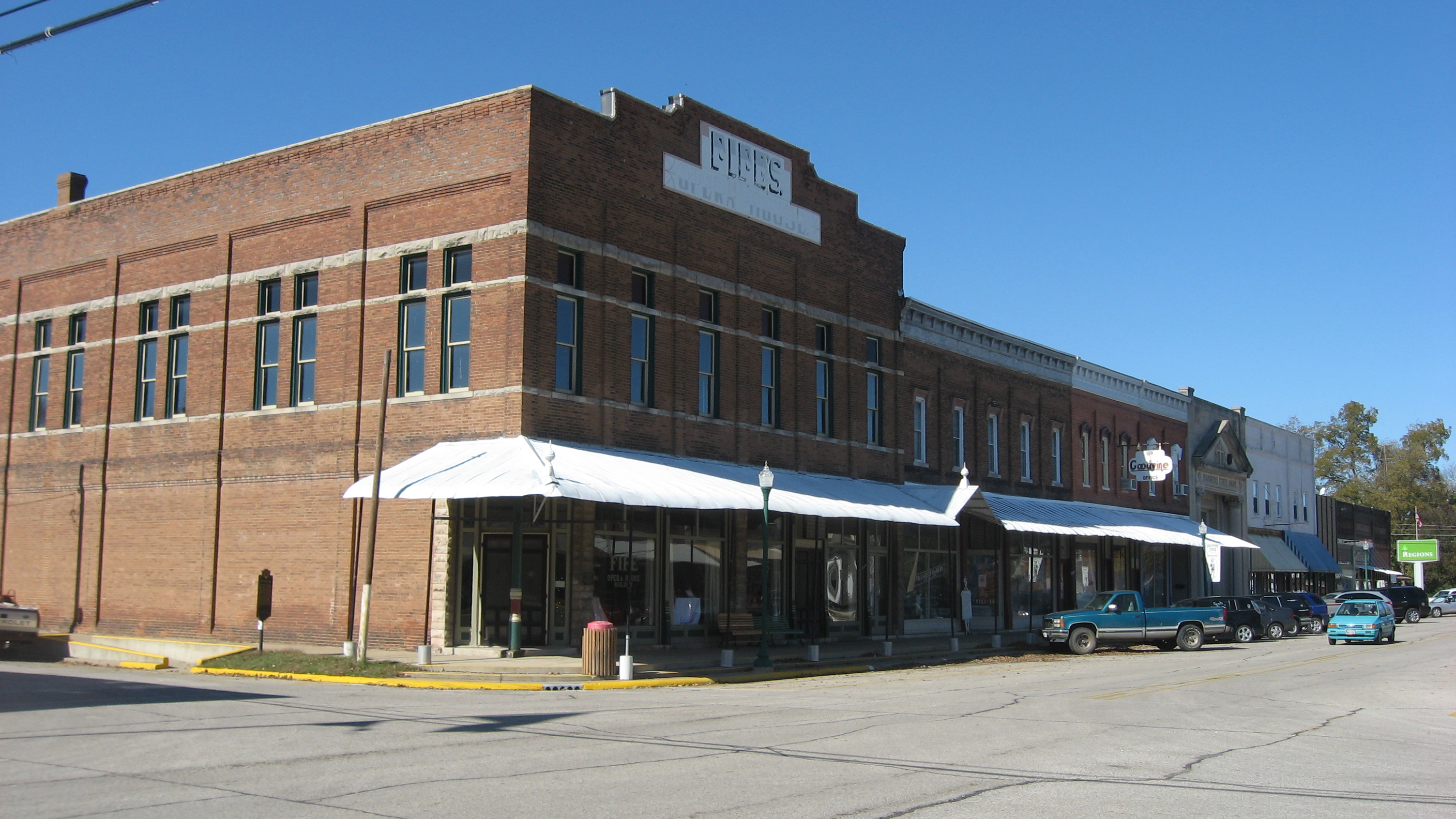
- Palestine's commercial district

- Location of Palestine in Crawford County, Illinois.
- Coordinates: 39°00′02″N 87°37′05″W
- Country: United States
- State: Illinois
- County: Crawford
- Chartered: 1811
- Incorporated: February 15, 1855
- Named for: Palestine

Area
  - Total: 0.79 sq mi (2.04 km^{2})
  - Land: 0.79 sq mi (2.04 km^{2})
  - Water: 0 sq mi (0.00 km^{2})
- Elevation: 449 ft (137 m)

Population (2020)
  - Total: 1,233
  - Density: 1,562.2/sq mi (603.15/km^{2})
- Time zone: UTC-6 (CST)
  - Summer (DST): UTC-5 (CDT)
- ZIP code: 62451
- Area code: 618
- FIPS code: 17–57277
- GNIS feature ID: 2399610
- Website: villageofpalestine.com

Palestine is a village in Crawford County, Illinois, United States. The population was 1,233 at the 2020 Census. Palestine has a total area of 0.79 square miles (2.05 km^{2}), all land.

== History ==
In 1678, French explorer Jean LaMotte named the region after Palestine, because the area reminded him of the biblical "land of milk and honey."

Palestine was chartered in 1811, while the area still belonged to Virginia, and is one of the oldest towns in the State of Illinois. It was named the seat of Crawford County in 1818. Elections in 1843 moved the county seat to a new site, which would become the town of Robinson. It was officially incorporated as an Illinois town in 1855.

== Demographics ==
Historical population
Census	Pop.	Note	%±
1880	735		—
1890	732		−0.4%
1900	979		33.7%
1910	1,399		42.9%
1920	1,803		28.9%
1930	1,670		−7.4%
1940	1,626		−2.6%
1950	1,589		−2.3%
1960	1,564		−1.6%
1970	1,640		4.9%
1980	1,718		4.8%
1990	1,619		−5.8%
2000	1,366		−15.6%
2010	1,369		0.2%
2020	1,233		−9.9%
U.S. Decennial Census

=== 2020 census ===
As of the 2020 census, Palestine had a population of 1,233. The population density was 1,562.74 inhabitants per square mile (603.38/km^{2}), and there were 654 housing units at an average density of 828.90 units per square mile (320.04 units/km^{2}).

The median age was 44.5 years. 20.4% of residents were under the age of 18 and 23.4% of residents were 65 years of age or older. For every 100 females there were 90.3 males, and for every 100 females age 18 and over there were 90.7 males age 18 and over.

0.0% of residents lived in urban areas, while 100.0% lived in rural areas.

There were 552 households in Palestine, and there were 347 families residing in the village. Of all households, 23.7% had children under the age of 18 living in them. 43.8% were married-couple households, 21.6% were households with a male householder and no spouse or partner present, and 28.8% were households with a female householder and no spouse or partner present. About 37.5% of all households were made up of individuals and 19.2% had someone living alone who was 65 years of age or older.

Of the 654 housing units, 15.6% were vacant. The homeowner vacancy rate was 4.5% and the rental vacancy rate was 16.2%.

Racial composition as of the 2020 census
Race	Number	Percent
White	1,171	95.0%
Black or African American	0	0.0%
American Indian and Alaska Native	0	0.0%
Asian	15	1.2%
Native Hawaiian and Other Pacific Islander	0	0.0%
Some other race	5	0.4%
Two or more races	42	3.4%
Hispanic or Latino (of any race)	10	0.8%

=== Income and poverty ===
The median income for a household in the village was $41,700, and the median income for a family was $49,732. Males had a median income of $41,458 versus $30,833 for females. The per capita income for the village was $24,531. About 8.4% of families and 12.6% of the population were below the poverty line, including 9.4% of those under age 18 and 6.3% of those age 65 or over.

== Climate ==
Climate data for Palestine, Illinois (1991–2020)
Month	Jan	Feb	Mar	Apr	May	Jun	Jul	Aug	Sep	Oct	Nov	Dec	Year
Mean daily maximum °F (°C)	38.4 (3.6)	43.5 (6.4)	54.4 (12.4)	66.6 (19.2)	76.1 (24.5)	84.1 (28.9)	86.5 (30.3)	85.7 (29.8)	80.4 (26.9)	68.4 (20.2)	53.6 (12.0)	42.1 (5.6)	65.0 (18.3)
Daily mean °F (°C)	30.6 (−0.8)	35.0 (1.7)	44.6 (7.0)	55.6 (13.1)	65.7 (18.7)	73.8 (23.2)	76.4 (24.7)	74.8 (23.8)	68.3 (20.2)	57.0 (13.9)	44.2 (6.8)	34.8 (1.6)	55.1 (12.8)
Mean daily minimum °F (°C)	22.8 (−5.1)	26.4 (−3.1)	34.7 (1.5)	44.5 (6.9)	55.4 (13.0)	63.4 (17.4)	66.3 (19.1)	64.0 (17.8)	56.2 (13.4)	45.6 (7.6)	34.8 (1.6)	27.5 (−2.5)	45.1 (7.3)
Average precipitation inches (mm)	3.48 (88)	2.63 (67)	3.58 (91)	5.06 (129)	4.91 (125)	4.88 (124)	4.23 (107)	3.53 (90)	3.58 (91)	3.73 (95)	3.63 (92)	3.06 (78)	46.3 (1,177)
Average snowfall inches (cm)	4.3 (11)	2.2 (5.6)	1.1 (2.8)	0.0 (0.0)	0.0 (0.0)	0.0 (0.0)	0.0 (0.0)	0.0 (0.0)	0.0 (0.0)	0.1 (0.25)	0.5 (1.3)	3.4 (8.6)	11.6 (29.55)
Source: NOAA

== Notable people ==
- Fred Dubois, U.S. senator from Idaho
- Augustus C. French, 9th governor of Illinois
- Herschel S. Green, Illinois state legislator
- Madge Miller Green, Illinois state senator
- Wickliffe Kitchell, attorney general of Illinois

== See also ==
- Fife Opera House
- Fort Lamotte
