= John Shaw Cabin =

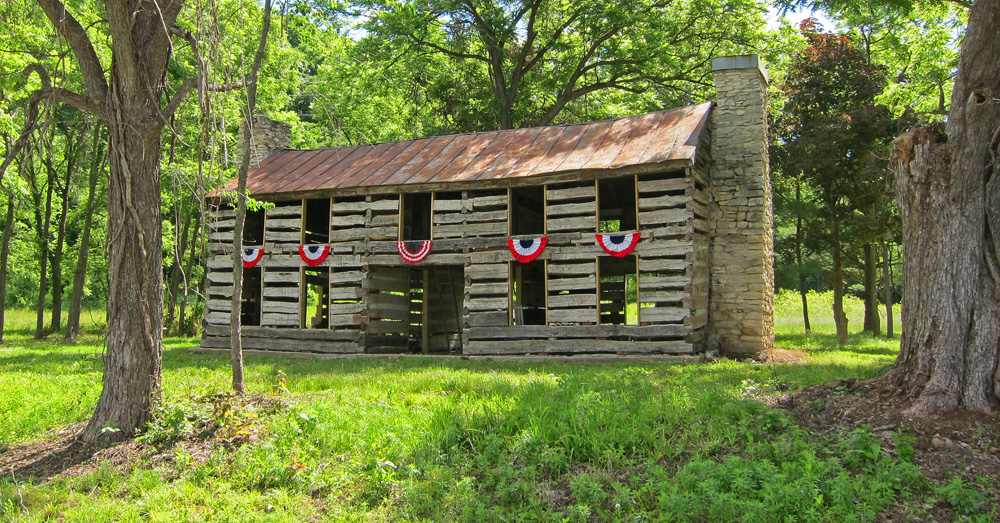
- Front view

General information
- Architectural style: Log cabin
- Location: 15852 N Mississippi River Rd, Hamburg, Illinois
- Coordinates: 39°14′54″N 90°43′22″W
- Completed: c. 1822
- Renovated: 1973

The John Shaw Cabin is a log cabin just north of the small village of Hamburg, Illinois. Built c. 1822, it is located roughly 70 miles southeast of Springfield. It is the oldest building in Calhoun County and one of the oldest in the state.

== History ==
Tha cabin is believed to have been built around 1822, meaning that it predates the breakaway of Calhoun County from Pike County in 1825. It served as a store room for locals who would leave food and livestock that would be sold to vendors in St. Louis via the Mississippi River. Around 1836 a man named John Shaw acquired the cabin along with nearly 100 other plots of land in the area. John was a private security contractor during the War of 1812 and served briefly as a private for the Missouri Rangers in the dying days of the war. Including the Battle of the Sink Hole in 1815. It is said on August 6, 1838, President Martin Van Buren signed a deed to the land in Hamburg. John would later become the founder of St. Marie, Wisconsin in 1851.

When Hamburg was selected as a temporary county seat in 1847 following a fire at the first Calhoun County Courthouse in Gilead, it is known that a house formerly owned by John was used as a store, voting place, and business hall. This "house" mentioned may have been the cabin, but it is unknown. The following year, the county seat and courthouse were moved to Hardin.

John died on August 31, 1871, aged 88. The cabin underwent a large renovation in 1973. The cabin and homestead are now in the hands of a private owner.
