= Calhoun County Courthouse (Illinois) =

Local government building in the United States

Coordinates: 39°9′25″N 90°37′8″W

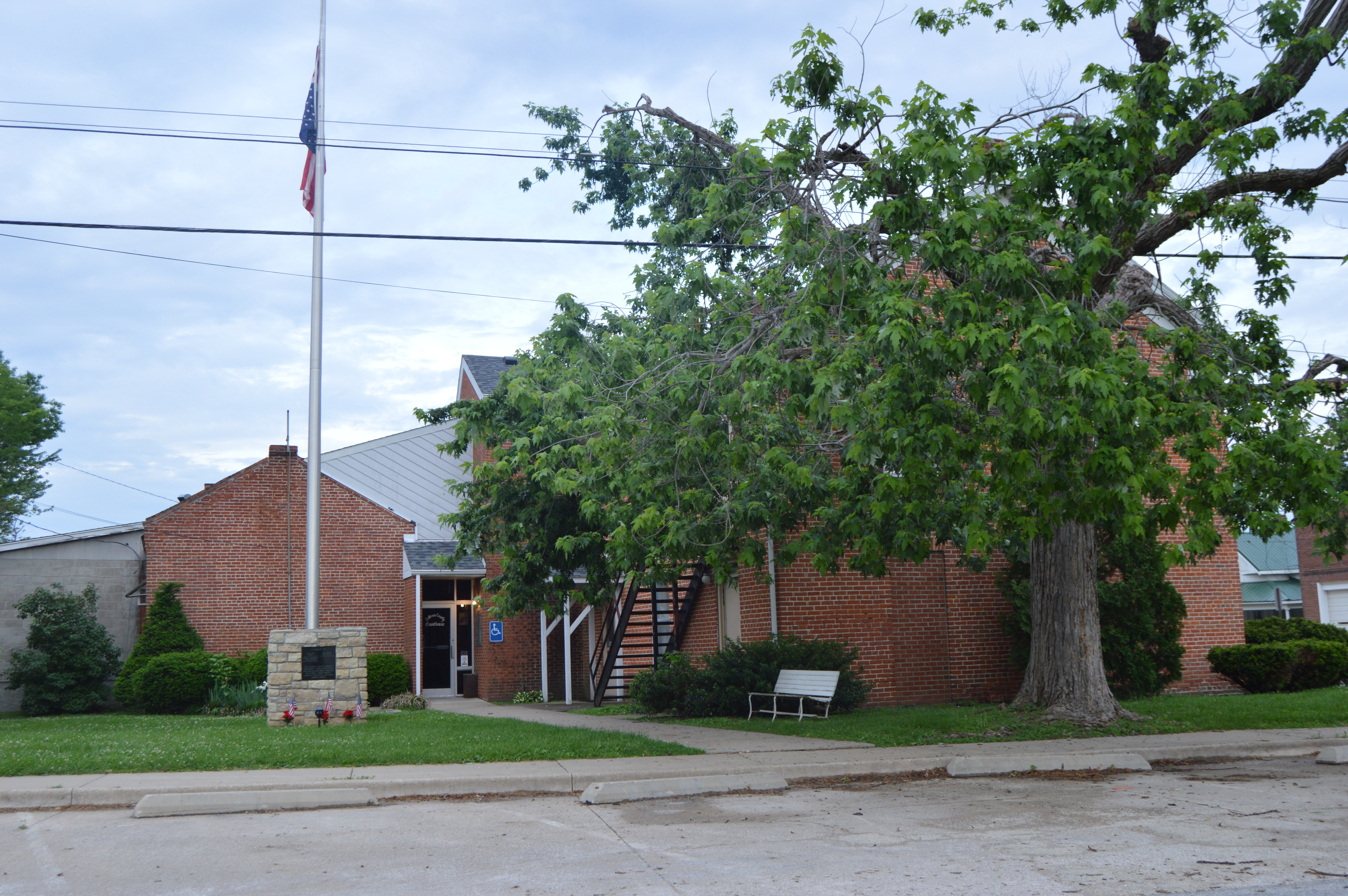
Front and northern side of the courthouse

The Calhoun County Courthouse is a government building in Hardin, the county seat of Calhoun County, Illinois, United States. Built in 1848 and expanded in the 20th century, it remains in use as the county's courthouse.

== History ==
Hardin County was formed in January 1825 out of the southern portion of Pike County; its first county seat was Coles Grove, which was soon renamed "Gilead". The county initially erected a log building, but it was small enough that officials had to rent privately owned buildings nearby. A permanent courthouse was constructed between 1830 and 1832 at a cost of $1,600; it was a square building, 30 feet (9.1 m) on each side, and two stories tall. Some county offices remained in other buildings, which enabled their records to survive an 1847 fire that destroyed the courthouse. The county commissioners took the opportunity to move the seat, choosing Hamburg as a temporary location and appointing an election to choose a permanent seat. While Hamburg was the seat, the county operated out of a residence. Later in 1847, the election was held, resulting in more votes for Childs' Landing than for Gilead and Hamburg combined.

Hardin's first settler was William Terry, who arrived in an unrecorded year. The site was known as "Terry's Landing" until 1835, when Benjamin Childs purchased the site, and it became "Childs' Landing". As late as 1847, it remained an unimportant location, but Benjamin Childs offered to donate: (a) land for a town, and (b) bricks for a courthouse, on condition that the seat be moved to his landing. The new town was platted late in the year and named for the recently deceased John J. Hardin. Its courthouse was completed in September 1848 at a price of $1,199, which was financed by the sale of Childs' donated land; the dimensions were 30 by 36 feet (11 m), and like the Gilead courthouse, it was a two-story brick building. Three windows pierced each side, with two windows and two doors on the gabled front end.

== Architecture ==
The 1848 building remains Hardin's courthouse in the 21st century, although with significant changes. An early cupola was removed during a 1939 restoration, and in 1978, county officials oversaw the construction of a modernist rear expansion. The older front part of the building has seen fewer changes than the rear, although some of the fenestration has been bricked up, and a fire escape has been added to the northern side.
