= Hardin, Illinois =

- Village
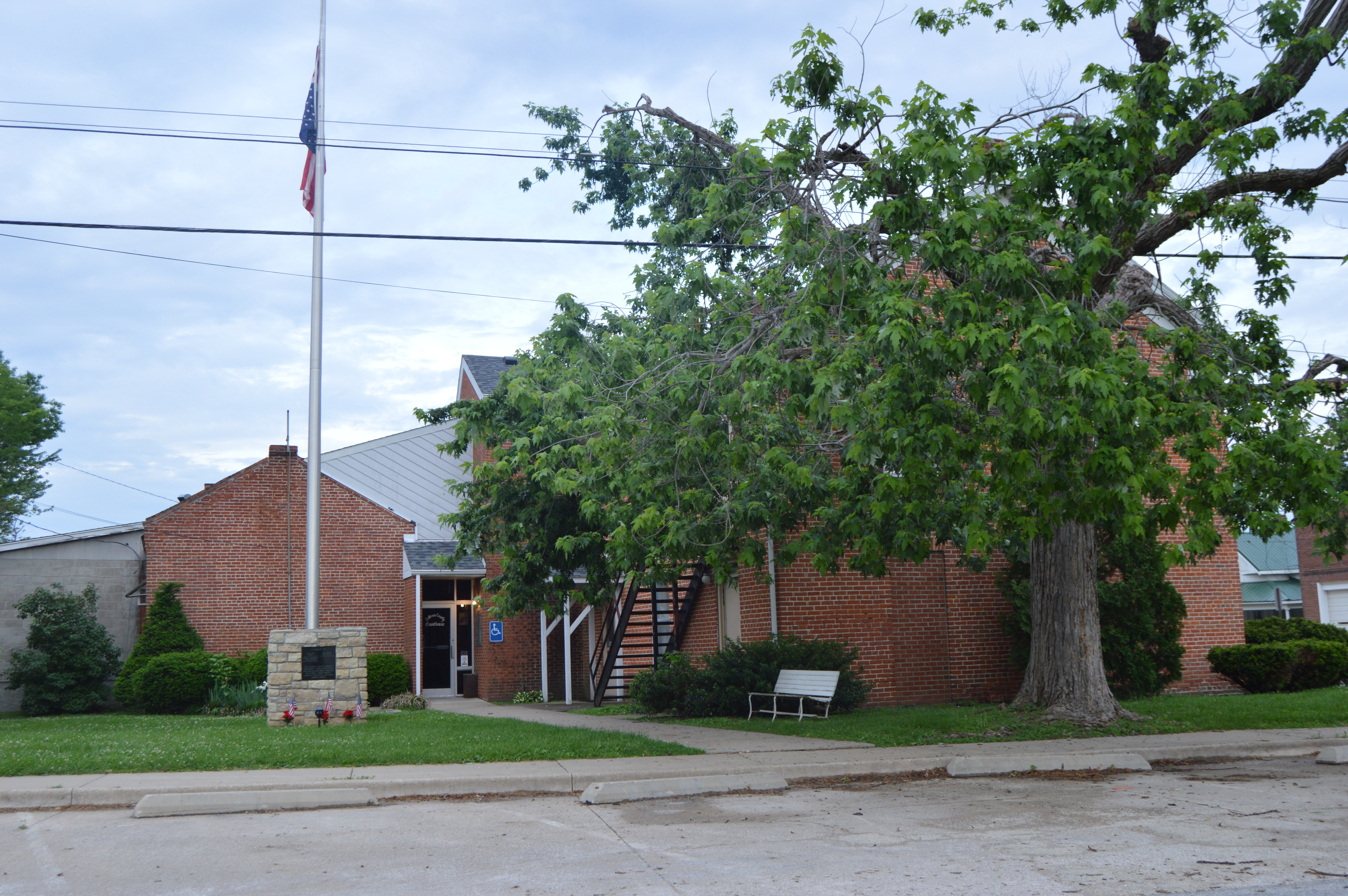
- Calhoun County Courthouse

- Seal
- Interactive map of Hardin, Illinois
- Location within Illinois Location within the United States
- Coordinates: 39°09′27″N 90°37′42″W
- Country: United States
- State: Illinois
- County: Calhoun
- Precinct: Hardin
- Incorporated: 1847
- Named after: John J. Hardin

Area
  - Total: 2.302 sq mi (5.96 km^{2})
  - Land: 2.128 sq mi (5.51 km^{2})
  - Water: 0.174 sq mi (0.45 km^{2})
- Elevation: 463 ft (141 m)

Population (2020)
  - Total: 801
  - Density: 376/sq mi (145/km^{2})
- Time zone: UTC-6 (CST)
  - Summer (DST): UTC-5 (CDT)
- ZIP code: 62047
- Area codes: 618/730
- FIPS code: 17-32850
- GNIS feature ID: 2398247
- Website: hardinil.com

Hardin is a village and county seat of Calhoun County, Illinois, United States. The population was 801 at the 2020 census, down from 967 at the 2010 census.

== History ==
Hardin was first known as Terry's Landing, after its first settler, Dr. William Terry, according to John Lammy's American Centennial celebration speech in Hardin on July 4, 1876. Benjamin F. Childs bought the landing in 1835 and renamed it Childs' Landing. The village name was changed to Hardin when it became the county seat of Calhoun County in 1847. The new name honored John J. Hardin, a former congressman and a colonel in the First Regiment of Illinois Volunteers, who was killed earlier that year in the Mexican–American War. Hardin became the seat of Calhoun County after the county courthouse had burned down in Gilead. The seat was temporarily moved to Hamburg. Still, after Benjamin Childs donated five acres of land and fifty thousand bricks for the new courthouse, as well as a free barbecue, it was decided in a vote that the county seat would be moved in 1847.

== Geography ==
According to the 2021 census gazetteer files, Hardin has a total area of 2.30 square miles (5.96 km^{2}), of which 2.13 square miles (5.52 km^{2}) (or 92.44%) is land and 0.17 square miles (0.44 km^{2}) (or 7.56%) is water.

== Demographics ==
Historical population
Census	Pop.	Note	%±
1880	300		—
1890	311		3.7%
1900	494		58.8%
1910	654		32.4%
1920	694		6.1%
1930	733		5.6%
1940	838		14.3%
1950	928		10.7%
1960	1,040		12.1%
1970	1,035		−0.5%
1980	1,107		7.0%
1990	1,071		−3.3%
2000	959		−10.5%
2010	967		0.8%
2020	801		−17.2%
U.S. Decennial Census

As of the 2020 census there were 801 people, 263 households, and 192 families residing in the village. The population density was 347.96 inhabitants per square mile (134.35/km^{2}). There were 370 housing units at an average density of 160.73 per square mile (62.06/km^{2}). The racial makeup of the village was 95.01% White, 0.12% African American, 0.12% Native American, 0.50% Asian, 1.50% from other races, and 2.75% from two or more races. Hispanic or Latino of any race were 1.62% of the population.

There were 263 households, out of which 25.9% had children under the age of 18 living with them, 63.88% were married couples living together, 5.32% had a female householder with no husband present, and 27.00% were non-families. 25.86% of all households were made up of individuals, and 11.41% had someone living alone who was 65 years of age or older. The average household size was 3.47, and the average family size was 2.82.

The village's age distribution consisted of 21.1% under the age of 18, 5.4% from 18 to 24, 16.5% from 25 to 44, 31% from 45 to 64, and 26.1% who were 65 years of age or older. The median age was 49.8 years. For every 100 females, there were 90.6 males. For every 100 females age 18 and over, there were 91.8 males.

The median income for a household in the village was $55,938, and the median income for a family was $78,846. Males had a median income of $37,917 versus $27,450 for females. The per capita income for the village was $24,596. About 15.1% of families and 20.3% of the population were below the poverty line, including 24.0% of those under age 18 and 7.1% of those age 65 or over.

== Education ==
The school district is Calhoun Community Unit School District 40.

== Notable people ==
- Thomas D. Bare (1867–1931), Illinois newspaper editor and state senator, lived in Hardin
- Jerry Corbett (1917–1997), businessman, baseball player, and politician, was born in Hardin
- Bill McGee (1909–1987), major league baseball pitcher for the St. Louis Cardinals and the New York Giants
