= Jim Smith (ice hockey, born 1957) =

American ice hockey administrator (born 1957)

- Born: August 4, 1957; Princeton, Wisconsin, United States
- Occupation(s): President of USA Hockey, co-founder Allegra MPM

James P. Smith (born August 4, 1957) is an American ice hockey administrator, who has served as the president of USA Hockey since 2015.

== Career ==
Smith was elected as the organization's fifth president since 1937 in 2015. He succeeded Ron DeGregorio, who retired after 12 years in the position. He was re-elected in 2018. Smith is a head coach of the Hornets Sled Hockey team, which skates out of Mount Prospect Ice Arena. He also is the co-founder of Allegra Marketing, Print and Mail, located in Elk Grove Village, Illinois.
