= Princeton Historic District =

Princeton Historic District may refer to:

- Princeton Historic District (Princeton, New Jersey), listed on the National Register of Historic Places in Mercer County, New Jersey
- Princeton Downtown Historic District, listed on the National Register of Historic Places in Green Lake County, Wisconsin
