= John Shaw (colonel) =

Settler

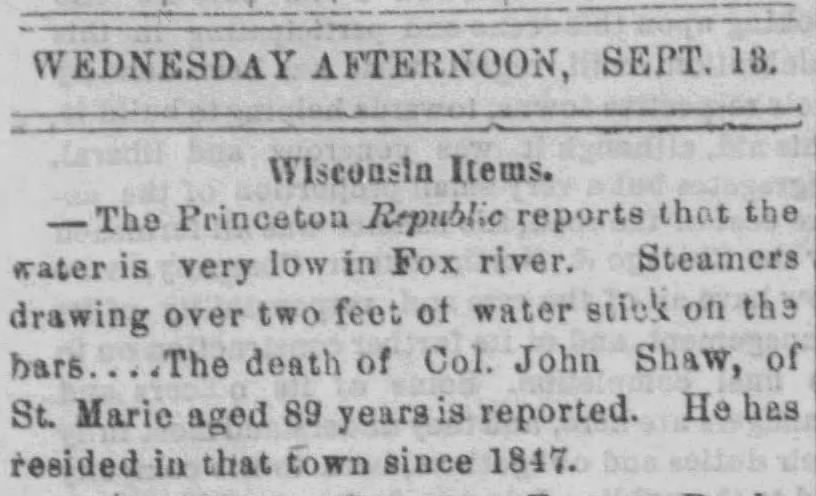
- John's death was noted in multiple Wisconsin newspapers, including the Wisconsin State Journal on Sep 13, 1871.

Personal details
- Born: January 1, 1783 Johnstown, New York, United States
- Died: August 31, 1871 (aged 88) Princeton, Wisconsin, United States
- Resting place: La Cote Sainte Marie Cemetery, Princeton, Wisconsin

Military service
- Allegiance: United States
- Branch/service: Army
- Years of service: c. 1814―1815
- Rank: Colonel
- Unit: Louisiana Rangers

John Shaw or "Colonel John Shaw" (January 1, 1783 – August 31, 1871) was a 19th-century businessman, soldier, and settler of the Midwestern United States.

== Biography ==
John was born on New Year's Day in 1783, to his father Comfort Shaw and mother Mary Hollinbeck in Johnstown, New York. Very little is known of his early life, but it is said that he had six brothers prior to his father's death in 1799 at the age of 40.

John would leave home in 1804 for New Orleans in search of business ventures. He was a private security contractor during the War of 1812 and served briefly as a private for the Missouri Rangers in the dying days of the war. Possibly including the Battle of the Sink Hole near the mouth of the Cuivre River in May, 1815. He was additionally commissioned by General Andrew Jackson to raise a regiment of rangers in Louisiana. Their arms and equipment being largely paid by John himself. The war would end before the regiment could reach New Orleans. This is likely where John acquired the rank of colonel. By 1816, it is known that John was a local trader with business ties in St. Louis, Missouri. Throughout John's travels, he came into contact with various native figures including Chief Black Hawk of the Sauk and Chief Red Bird of the Ho-Chunk, among others. Some of his interactions would ultimately result in legal problems.

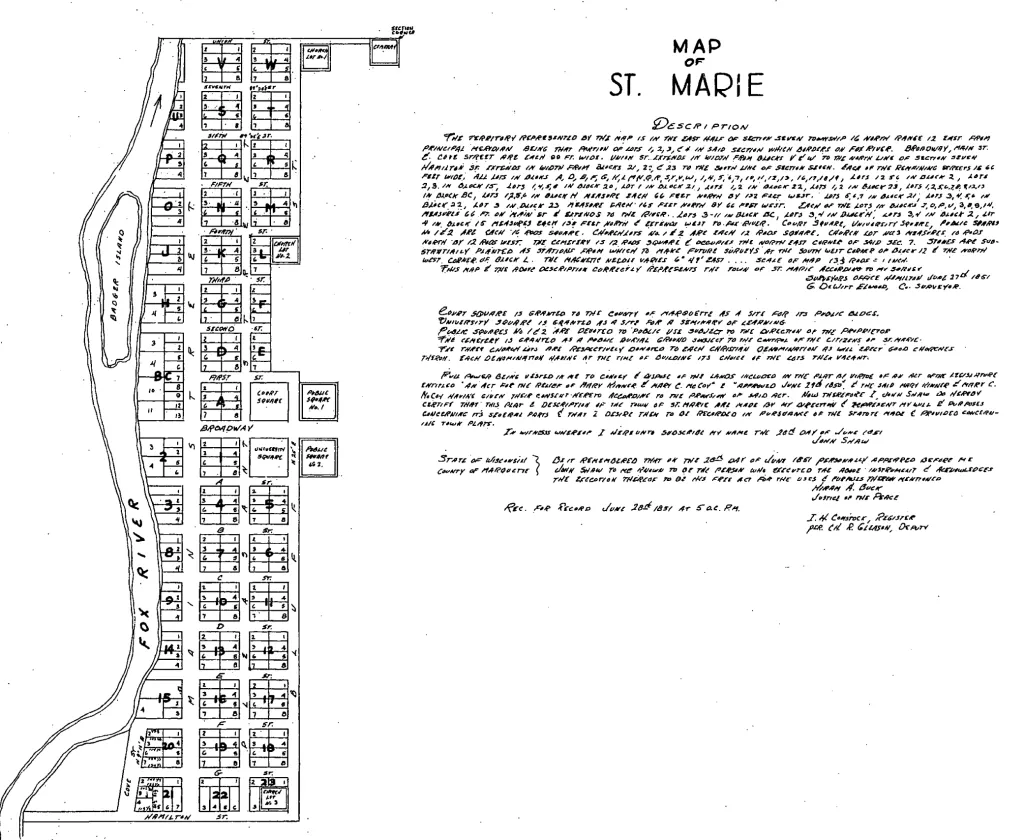
The original plat of St. Marie filed in 1851.

The very next year, on July 27 his mother Mary would pass away aged 60. In 1818, John was responsible for the first flour mill in, what was at the time, the northwest of the United States, being built in the city of Prairie du Chien. In 1836, John purchased 100 plots of land in the small village of Hamburg, Illinois. This would include what would later be called the John Shaw Cabin, built c. 1822. John was so prominent in Hamburg, that he became known as the "Black Prince". This land is located roughly 30 miles south of El Dara. The village is home to the Shaw Cemetery where two of John's brothers are buried, Daniel and Comfort Shaw, as well as their relatives. John is known to have left Hamburg and traveled north up the Mississippi River by 1841.

=== Life in Wisconsin ===
John would later claim to have moved to Princeton in the Wisconsin Territory in 1845, but Marquette County census records don't show him living there until 1846. (Marquette County once included the land now known as Green Lake County from 1836-1858.) There, in 1851, he filled a plat for the town of St. Marie, in an area formerly known as Shaw's Landing along the Fox River, he would subsequently become the founder. Of the estimated 30 buildings that were constructed, including a post office and a small wooden bridge across the river during the town's height, not a single one remains. By the 1850s, John was in worsening health and was legally blind by 1854.

=== Legacy ===
John would pass away in Princeton on August 31, 1871, at the age of 88. He was buried on what is now private property in the small La Cote Sainte Marie Cemetery. As of 2021, his head stone seems to have been lost. Despite the population dwindling to around only 350 people, the town of St. Marie still exists to this day. The single-room town hall sits alone at N7090 Co Road D.
