= Plainview, Illinois =

- Unincorporated community
- Location within Illinois Location within the United States
- Coordinates: 39°09′33″N 89°59′23″W
- Country: United States
- State: Illinois
- County: Macoupin
- Elevation: 614 ft (187 m)
- Time zone: UTC-6 (Central (CST))
  - Summer (DST): UTC-5 (CDT)
- Area code: 618
- GNIS feature ID: 415754

Plainview is an unincorporated community in Hillyard Township, Macoupin County, Illinois, United States. Plainview is 4 miles (6.4 km) northeast of Shipman.

== History ==
Plainview had a post office, which closed on October 3, 1998. Thomas D. Bare (1867–1931), Illinois newspaper editor and state senator, was born in Plainview.
