= Princeton, Wisconsin =

- City
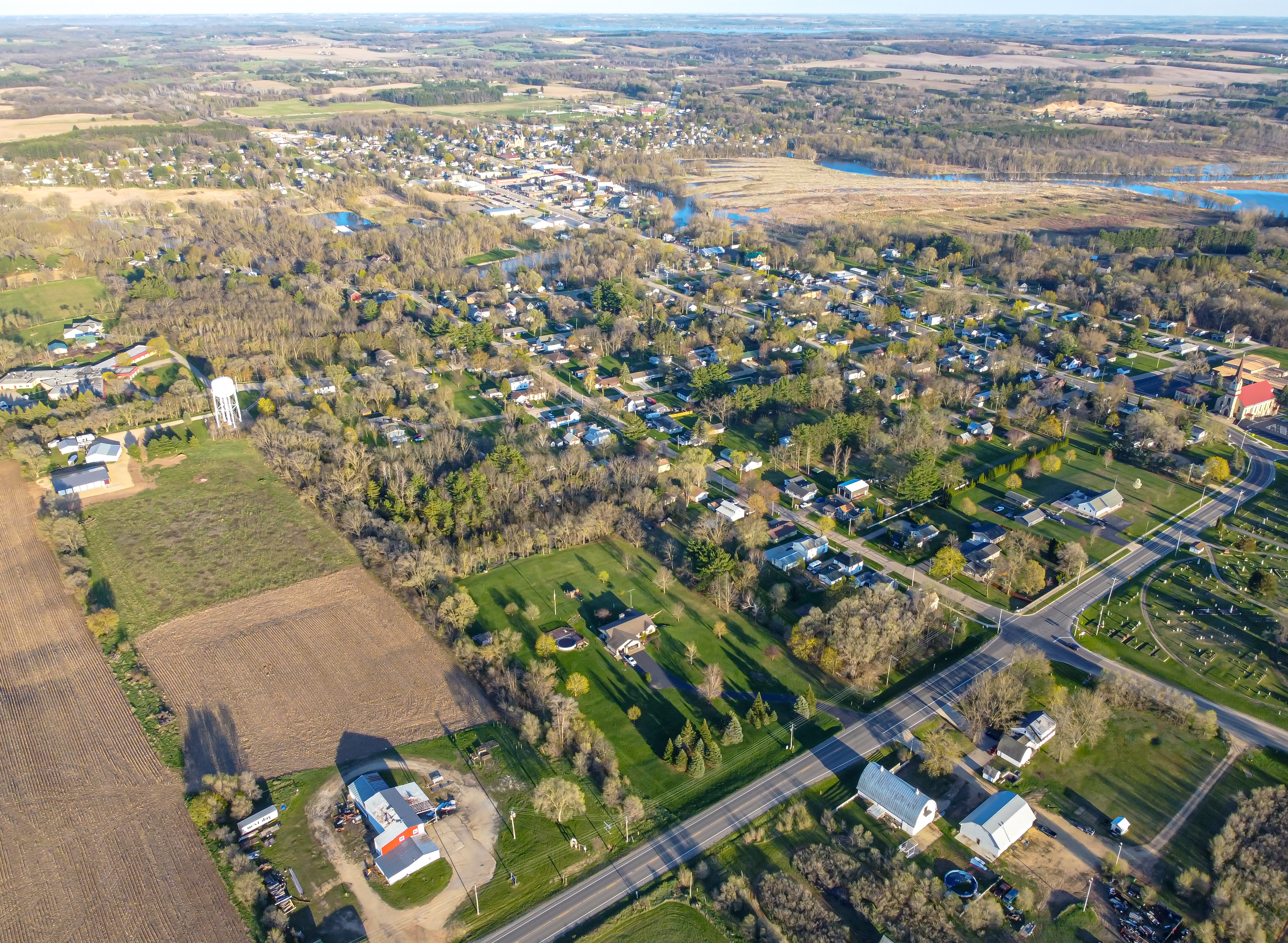
- Wis-23 and Wis-73 junction in town

- Location of Princeton in Green Lake County, Wisconsin.

- Location within Wisconsin Location within the United States
- Coordinates: 43°51′1″N 89°7′47″W
- Country: United States
- State: Wisconsin
- County: Green Lake

Area
  - Total: 1.64 sq mi (4.26 km^{2})
  - Land: 1.55 sq mi (4.02 km^{2})
  - Water: 0.093 sq mi (0.24 km^{2})
- Elevation: 770 ft (230 m)

Population (2020)
  - Total: 1,267
  - Density: 816/sq mi (315/km^{2})
- Time zone: UTC-6 (Central (CST))
  - Summer (DST): UTC-5 (CDT)
- Postal code: 54968
- Area code: 920
- FIPS code: 55-65600
- Website: cityofprincetonwi.com

Princeton is a city in western Green Lake County, Wisconsin, United States. The population was 1,267 at the 2020 census. The city is located within the Town of Princeton. The Fox River flows through the city, dividing the city into an eastern half and western half.

== History ==
A post office has been in operation in Princeton since 1849. The city was named after Princeton, Massachusetts. On March 4, 1920, "the village trustees passed a resolution to become a city of the fourth class." After that, "The resolution was approved by the state and Princeton became a city." Princeton was formerly named "Pleasant Valley" and was part of Marquette County.

== Geography ==
According to the United States Census Bureau, the city has a total area of 1.64 square miles (4.25 km^{2}), of which 1.54 square miles (3.99 km^{2}) is land and 0.10 square miles (0.26 km^{2}) is water.

== Demographics ==
Historical population
Census	Pop.	Note	%±
1870	705		—
1880	961		36.3%
1890	986		2.6%
1900	1,202		21.9%
1910	1,269		5.6%
1920	1,275		0.5%
1930	1,183		−7.2%
1940	1,247		5.4%
1950	1,371		9.9%
1960	1,509		10.1%
1970	1,446		−4.2%
1980	1,479		2.3%
1990	1,458		−1.4%
2000	1,504		3.2%
2010	1,214		−19.3%
2020	1,267		4.4%
U.S. Decennial Census

=== 2010 census ===
As of the census of 2010, there were 1,214 people, 551 households, and 312 families residing in the city. The population density was 788.3 inhabitants per square mile (304.4/km^{2}). There were 638 housing units at an average density of 414.3 per square mile (160.0/km^{2}). The racial makeup of the city was 97.3% White, 1.0% African American, 0.6% Native American, 0.4% Asian, 0.2% from other races, and 0.6% from two or more races. Hispanic or Latino of any race were 1.5% of the population.

There were 551 households, of which 26.0% had children under the age of 18 living with them, 41.9% were married couples living together, 9.8% had a female householder with no husband present, 4.9% had a male householder with no wife present, and 43.4% were non-families. 38.7% of all households were made up of individuals, and 20.5% had someone living alone who was 65 years of age or older. The average household size was 2.15 and the average family size was 2.83.

The median age in the city was 44.7 years. 22.9% of residents were under the age of 18; 5% were between the ages of 18 and 24; 22.6% were from 25 to 44; 28.5% were from 45 to 64; and 20.9% were 65 years of age or older. The gender makeup of the city was 46.6% male and 53.4% female.

=== 2000 census ===
As of the census of 2000, there were 1,504 people, 576 households, and 353 families residing in the city. The population density was 923.5 people per square mile (356.3/km^{2}). There were 636 housing units at an average density of 390.5 per square mile (150.7/km^{2}). The racial makeup of the city was 98.94% White, 0.47% Black or African American, 0.20% Native American, 0.20% Pacific Islander, and 0.20% from two or more races. 0.80% of the population were Hispanic or Latino of any race.

There were 576 households, out of which 26.9% had children under the age of 18 living with them, 48.6% were married couples living together, 8.7% had a female householder with no husband present, and 38.7% were non-families. 34.2% of all households were made up of individuals, and 21.7% had someone living alone who was 65 years of age or older. The average household size was 2.30 and the average family size was 2.97.

In the city, the population was spread out, with 21.1% under the age of 18, 6.5% from 18 to 24, 22.5% from 25 to 44, 20.1% from 45 to 64, and 29.7% who were 65 years of age or older. The median age was 45 years. For every 100 females, there were 79.0 males. For every 100 females age 18 and over, there were 76.1 males.

The median income for a household in the city was $32,679, and the median income for a family was $41,023. Males had a median income of $31,912 versus $21,719 for females. The per capita income for the city was $18,047. About 5.1% of families and 12.9% of the population were below the poverty line, including 12.0% of those under age 18 and 23.5% of those age 65 or over.

== Religion ==
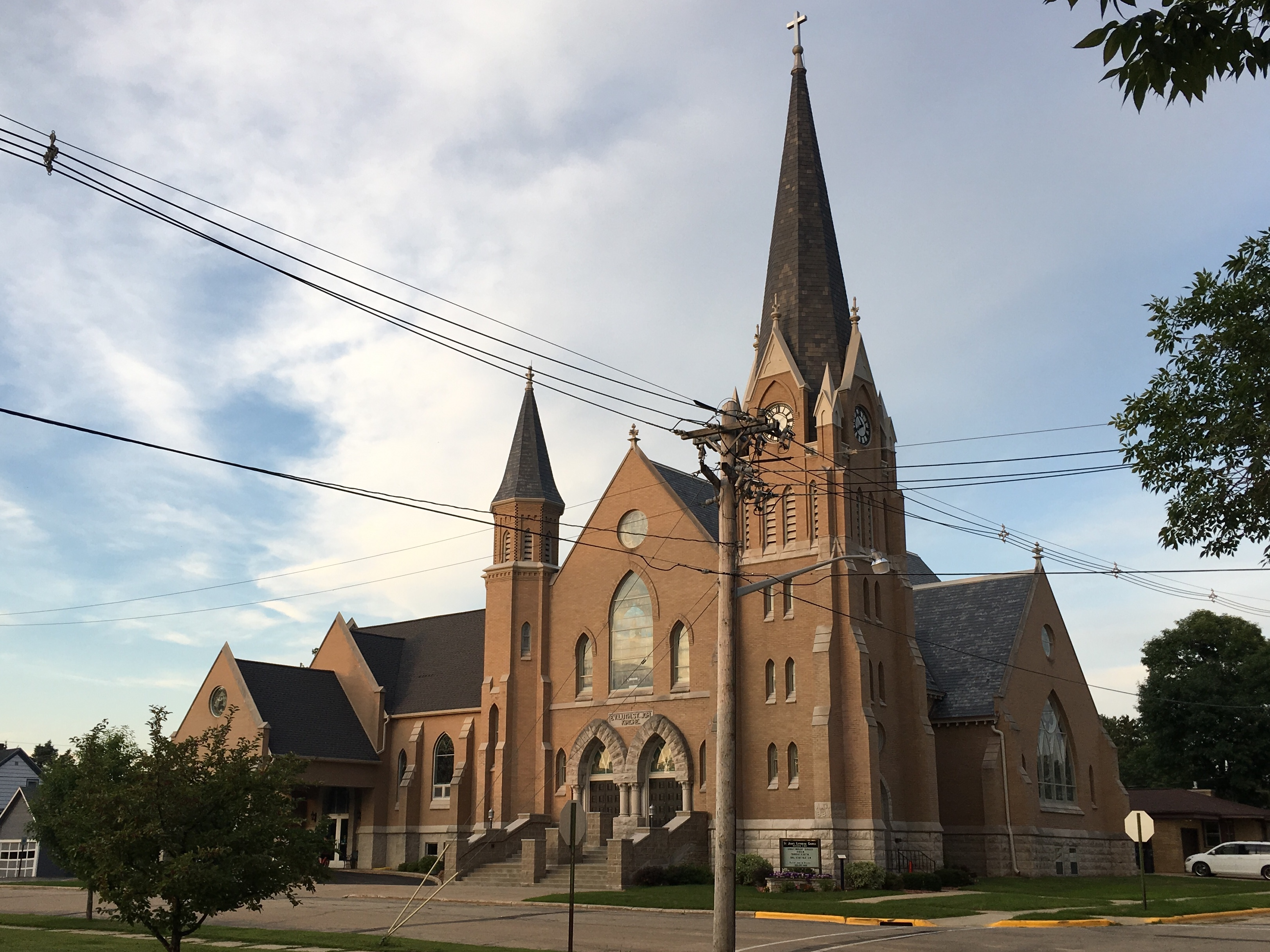
St. John's Lutheran Church in Princeton, WI

St. John's Lutheran Church, a member of the Wisconsin Evangelical Lutheran Synod, is located on the east side of Princeton. St. John the Baptist Catholic Church is located on the west side of town.

== Transportation ==
Princeton is served by WIS 23 and WIS 73 along Fulton St. and Main St. Wis 23 goes west to Montello and east to Green Lake. Wis 73 goes north to Neshkoro and Wautoma and south to Randolph.

Green Lake County Hwys. D (Fulton St., Main St. & River Rd.), J (Harris St., Main St. & Fulton St.) and T (Farmer St.) also enter into town.

Water St. is the main street in Downtown Princeton.

== Culture ==
Princeton Flea Market

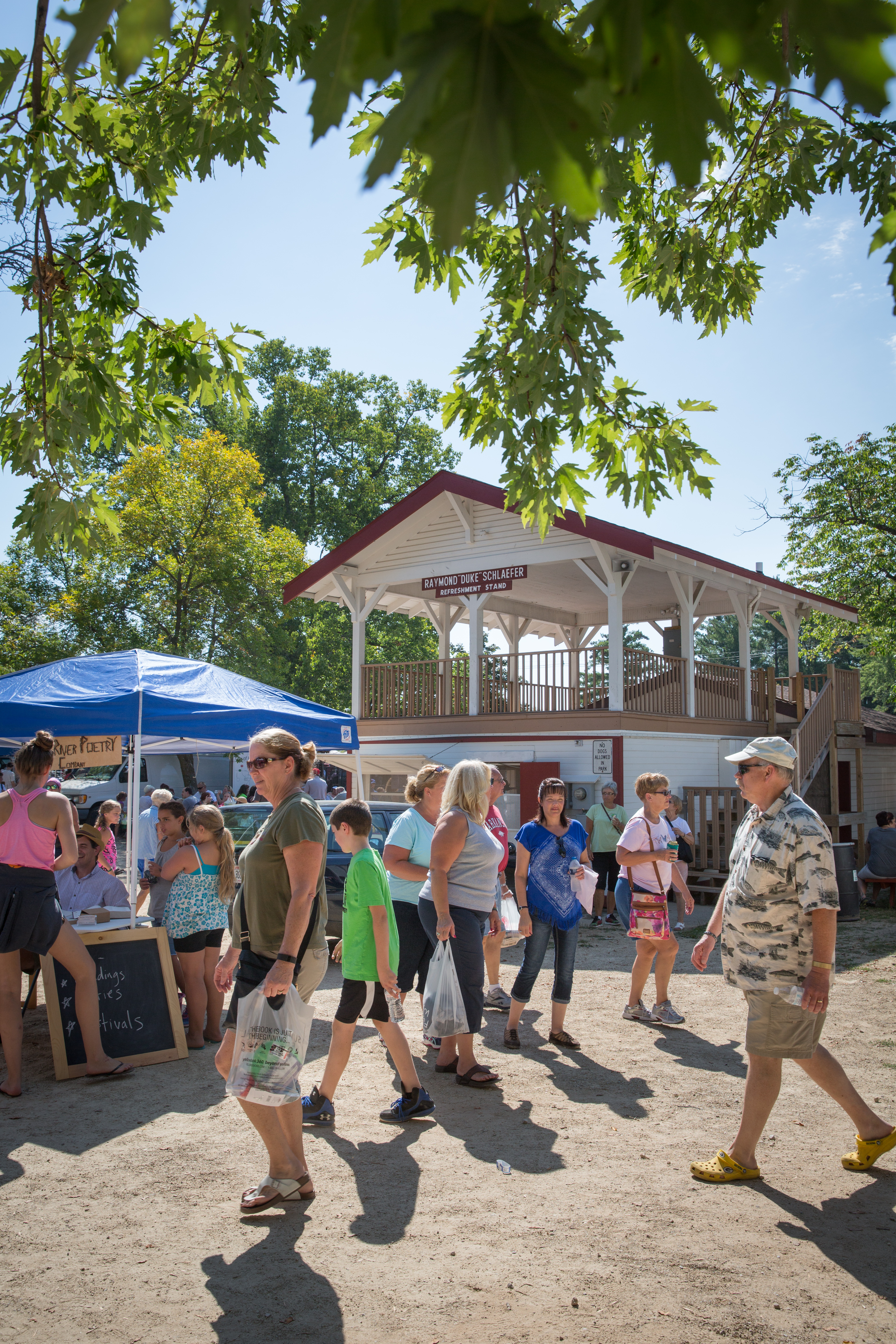
Princeton's flea market

Princeton has a flea market on Saturdays from mid-April through mid-October. Claimed as “Wisconsin’s Largest Weekly Outdoor Flea Market,” admission and parking is free and there is an abundance of shopping and food options. Local service groups and organizations serve concessions from the historic food stand in center of the Park. Other vendors serve a wide variety of food including egg rolls, and fresh-made donuts. The Information Center is also housed in the food stand.

Shopping Around 2000, Princeton's downtown experienced a "renaissance" where many of the historic buildings were revitalized and became home to artists and creative retailers. In 2008, the downtown core suffered closings and changes but since 2012, an upswing in new businesses and ownership has brought Princeton back to life. Princeton has been cited on some travel sites for its preserved downtown and its destination shopping.

Muk Luks Handcraft Co. produced a knitted slipper sock with a leather sole in Princeton starting in the late 1930s. The famed "Muk Luks" became fashionable in the 1940s - 1950s, gracing the cover of magazines and celebrities like Audrey Hepburn, President Eisenhower and others. The company at one time employed over 450 workers spread out in 3 factories located in Stevens Point, Markesan and Princeton. The Muk Luks brand and patents were sold to Reliable of Milwaukee in the 1970s. Handcraft Co. continued producing socks and hosiery into the late 1990s.

== Education ==
Public education is provided by the Princeton School District.

== Notable people ==
- George R. Currie (1900―1983), Chief Justice of the Wisconsin Supreme Court
- Waldo Flint (1820―1900), Wisconsin State Senator
- Denis Kitchen (1946― ), cartoonist
- Addison W. Merrill (1842―1920), Wisconsin State Representative
- William A. Schmidt (1902―1992), Wisconsin State Senator
- John Shaw (1783―1871), businessman and settler of the Midwestern United States; lived in Princeton for 26 years
- Jim Smith (1957― ), president of USA Hockey
- Ferdinand T. Yahr (1834―1910), Wisconsin State Senator

== Images ==
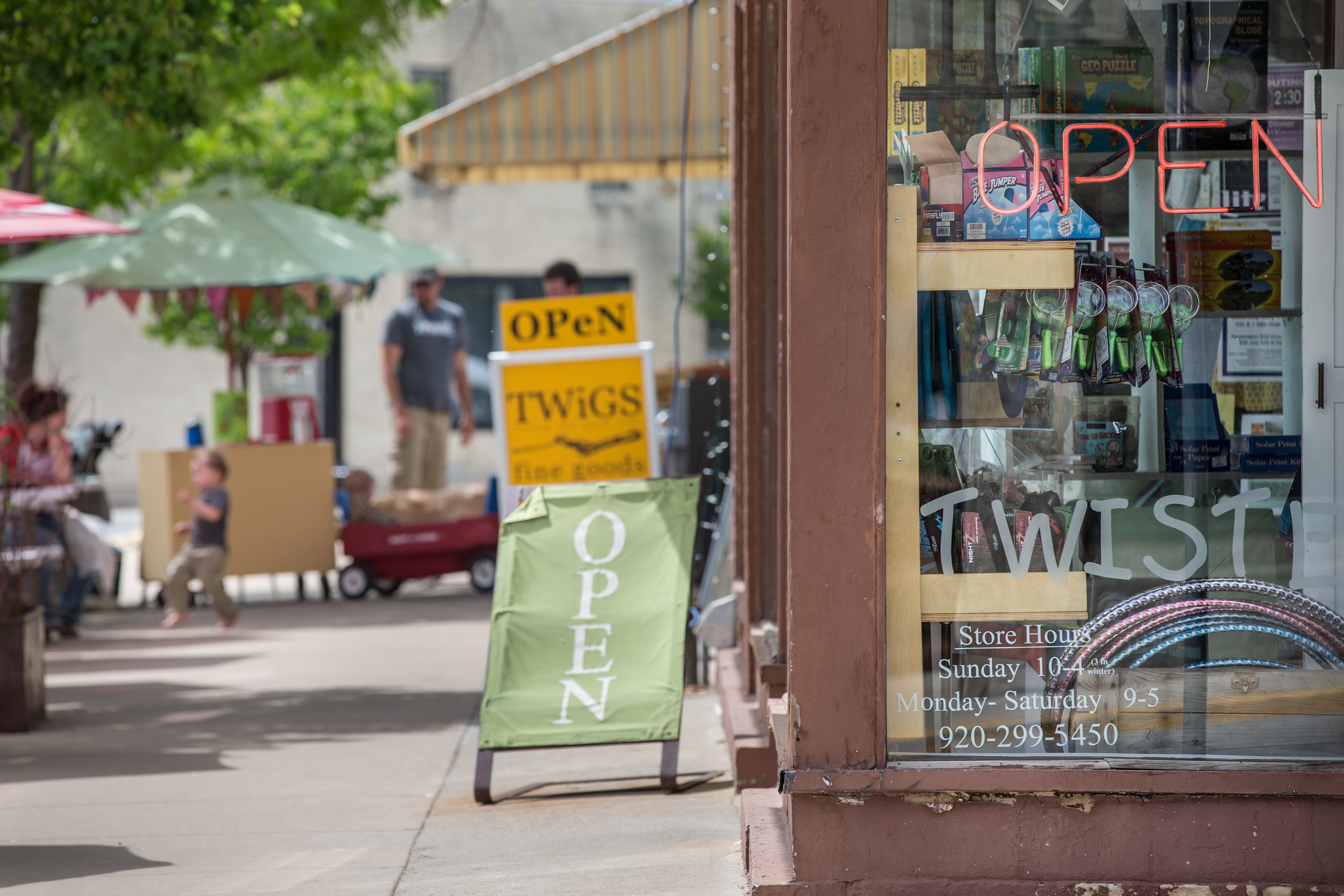
Shopping on Water Street Downtown

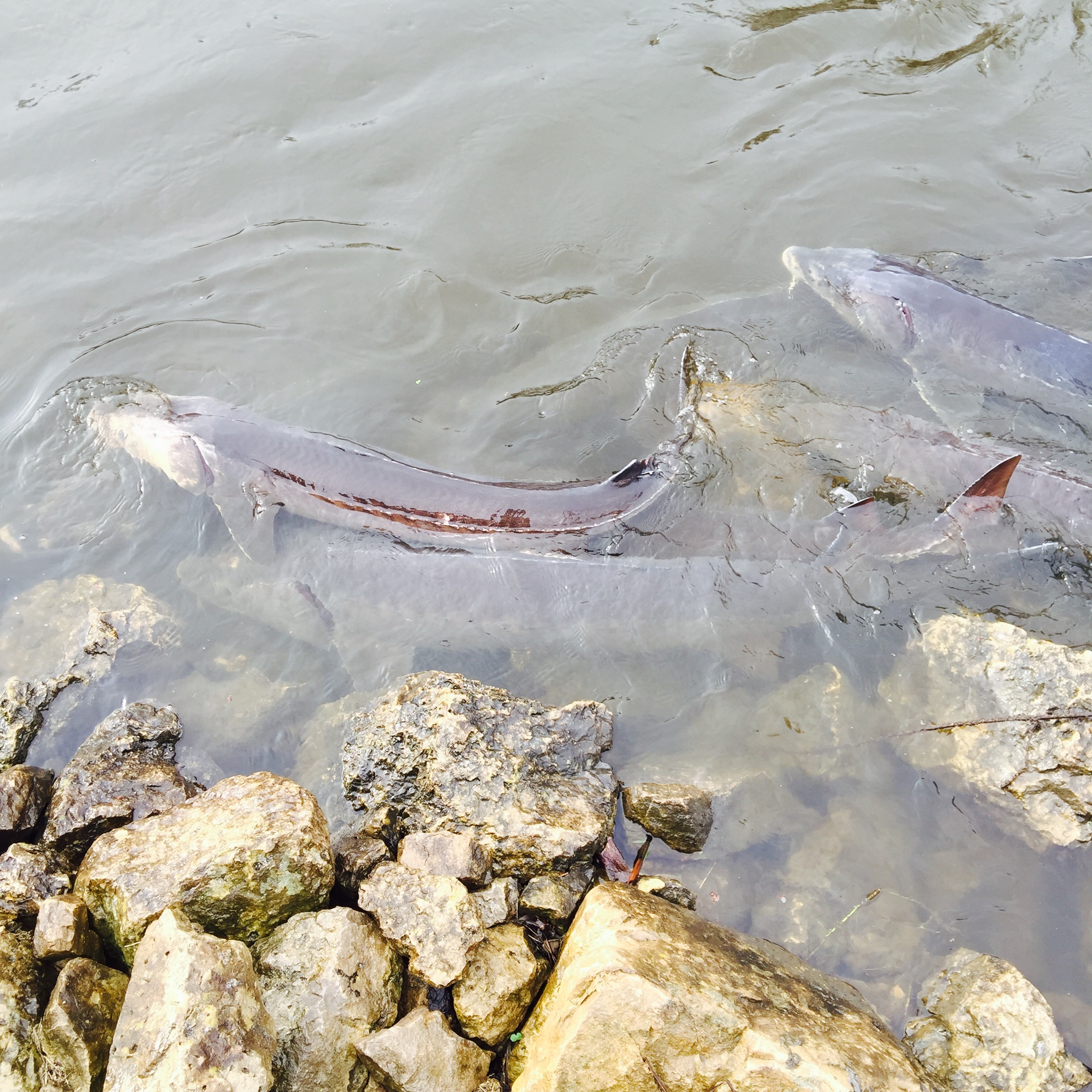
Sturgeon Spawning every Spring on the Fox River

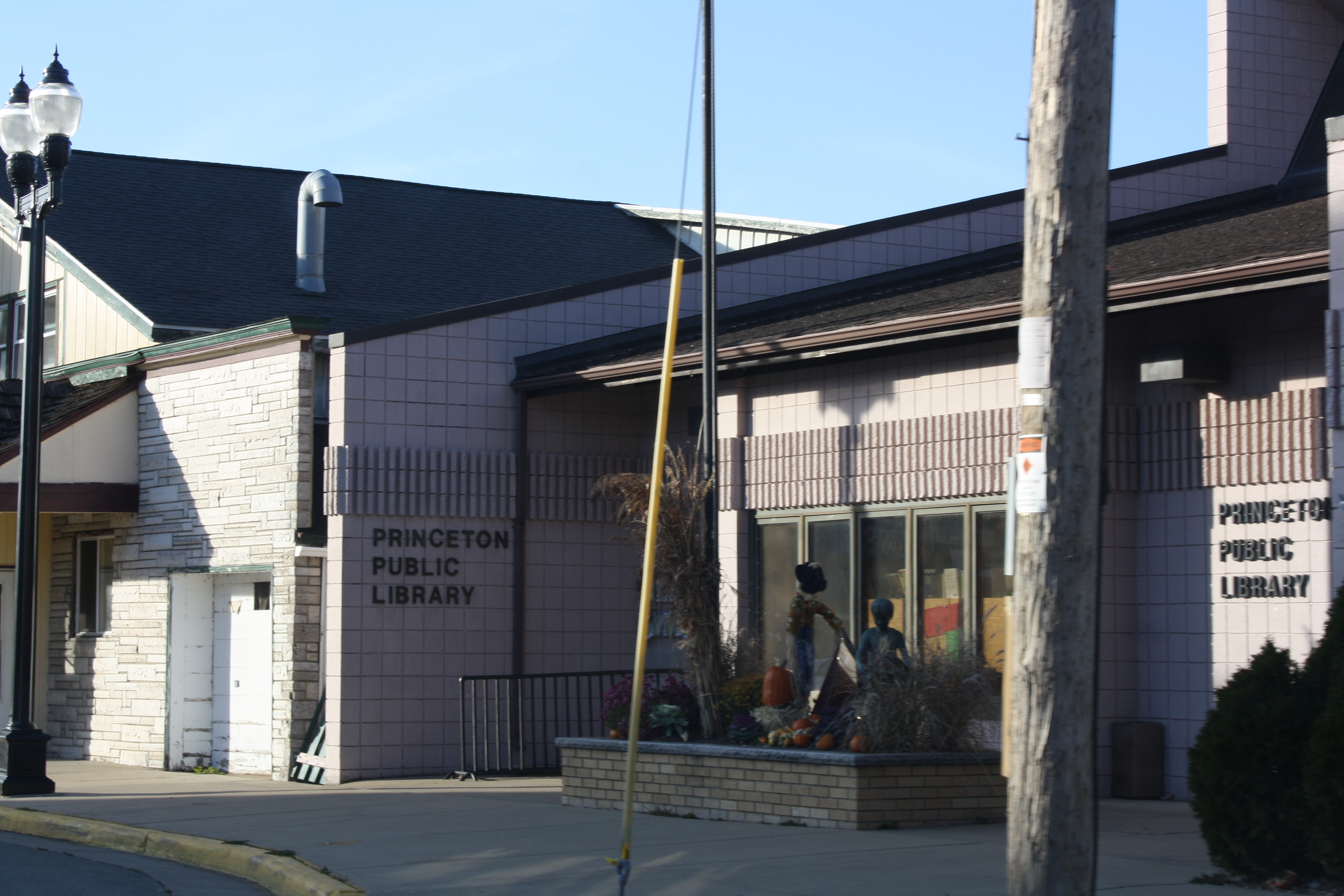
Princeton Public Library

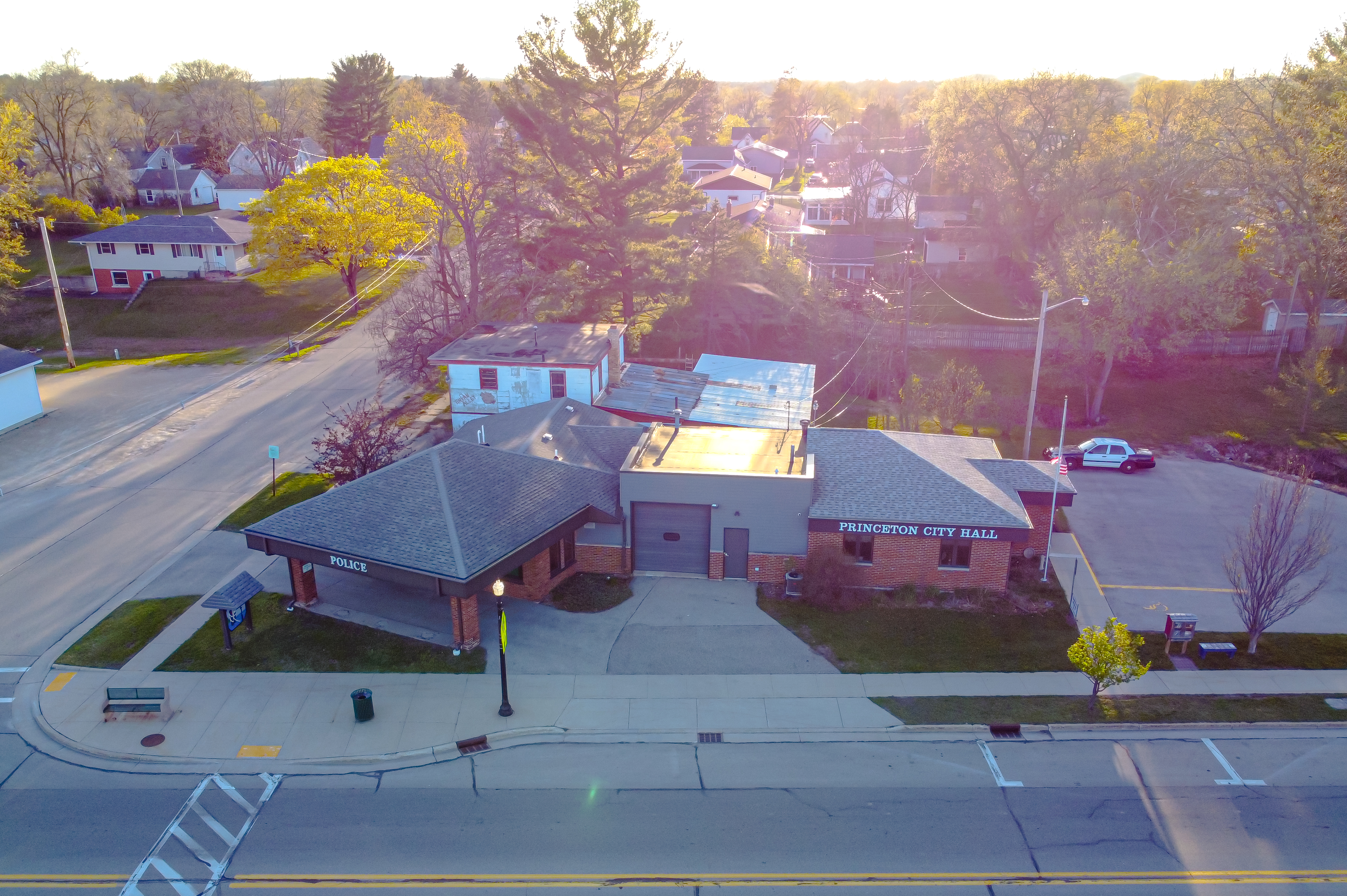
City hall / Police station

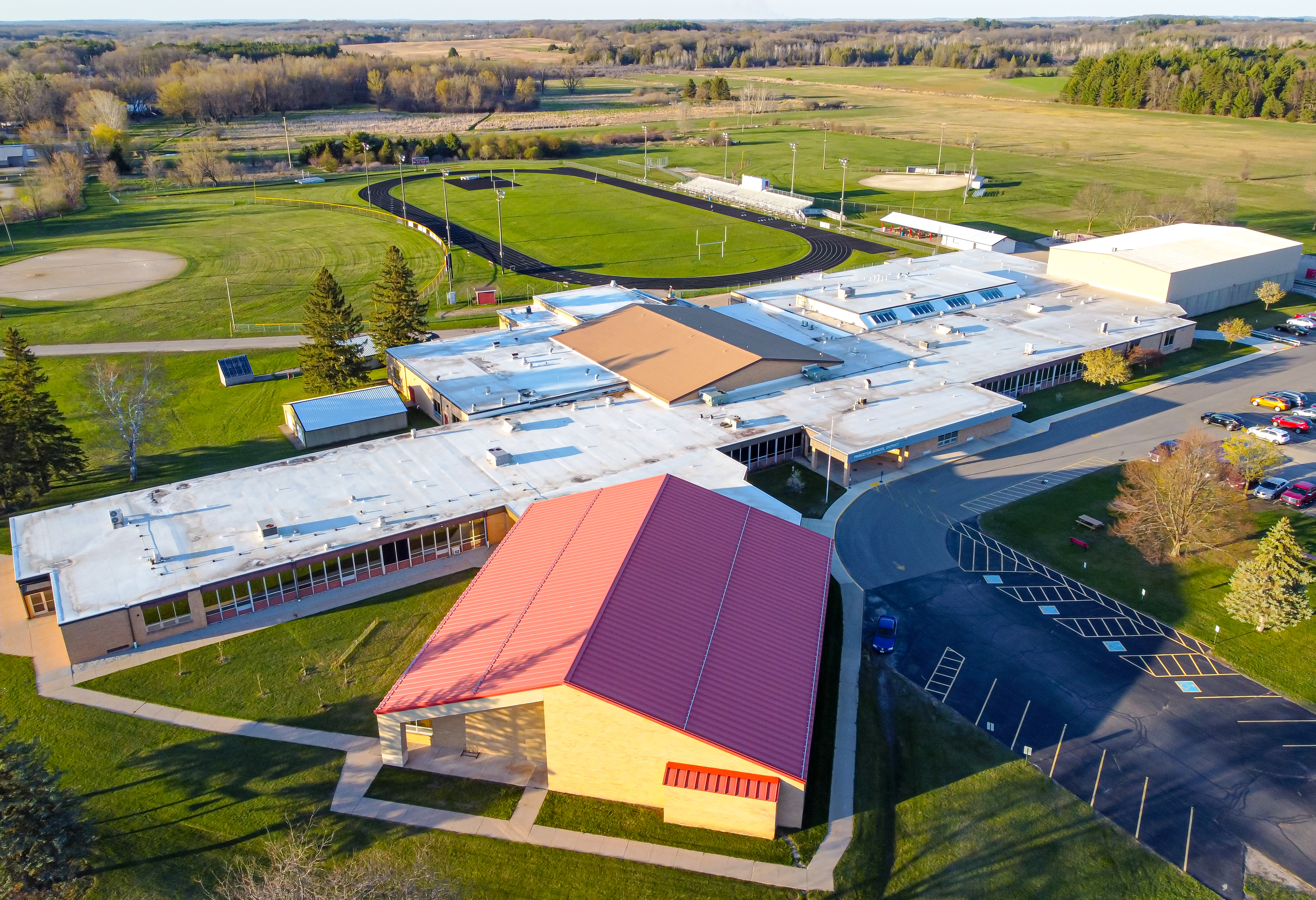
Princeton High School

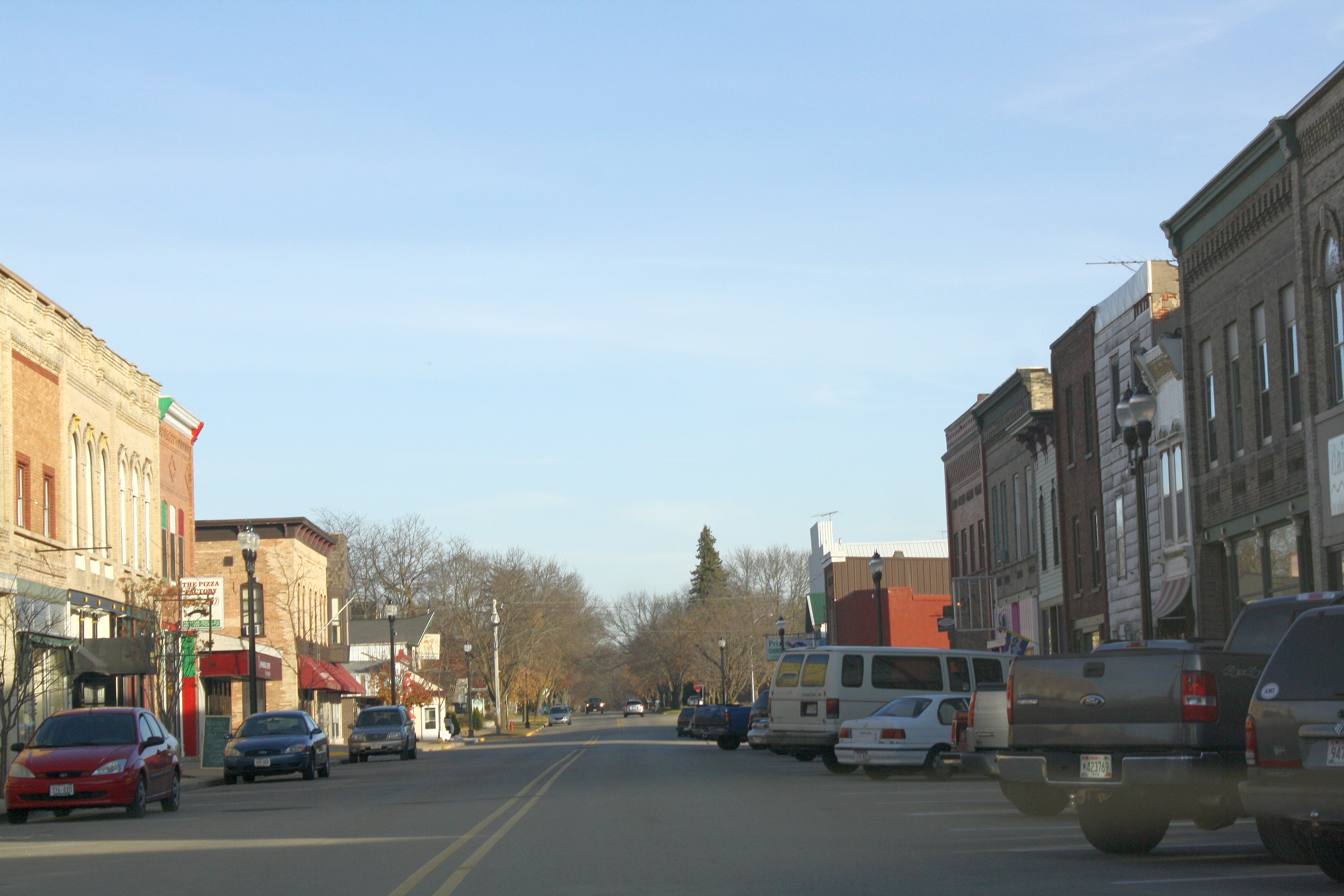
Princeton Downtown Historic District
