= Jerry Corbett =

American baseball player and politician

Jerome Garrett Corbett (January 19, 1917 – October 20, 1997) was an American businessman, baseball player, and politician.

Corbett was born in Hardin, Illinois. He went to Hardin High School and then graduated from Routt Catholic High School in Jacksonville, Illinois. He served in the United States Army during World War II. He went to Saint Louis University and the University of Illinois Urbana–Champaign. He played semi-pro baseball for the St. Louis Browns.

Corbett was an automobile dealer and lived in Hardin, Illinois. He was also a grain and livestock farmer. Corbett was also in the real estate business, Corbett served in the Illinois House of Representatives from 1969 to 1973 and was a Democrat. In 1973, he was acquitted for violating the Illinois Purchasing Act concerning automobile sales involving the family automobile dealership. He died at St. Mary's Health Center in Richmond Heights, Missouri.
