= St. Marie, Wisconsin =

- Town
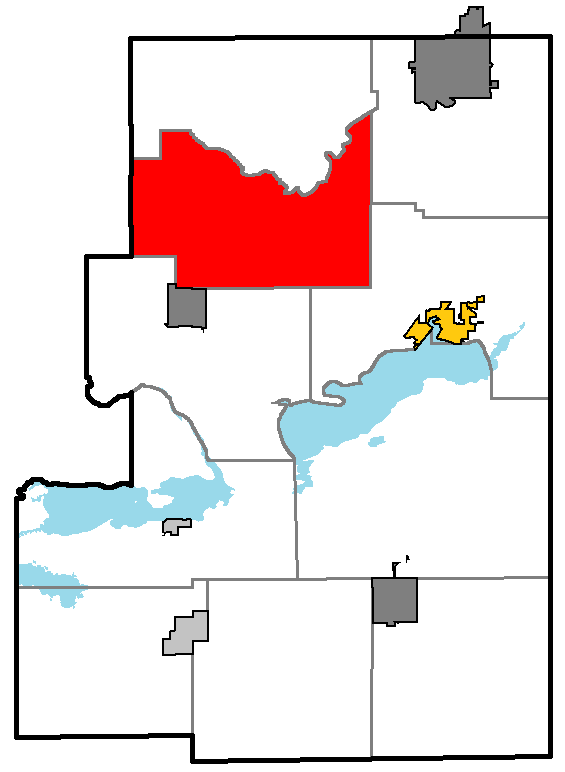
- Location of St. Marie, Wisconsin

- Location of Green Lake County, Wisconsin
- Coordinates: 43°53′56″N 89°5′38″W
- Country: United States
- State: Wisconsin
- County: Green Lake

Government
  - Mayor: Joseph Femali

Area
  - Total: 33.5 sq mi (86.8 km^{2})
  - Land: 33.5 sq mi (86.8 km^{2})
  - Water: 0.039 sq mi (0.1 km^{2})
- Elevation: 771 ft (235 m)

Population (2000)
  - Total: 341
  - Density: 10/sq mi (3.9/km^{2})
- Time zone: UTC-6 (Central (CST))
  - Summer (DST): UTC-5 (CDT)
- Area code: 920
- FIPS code: 55-70925
- GNIS feature ID: 1584091

St. Marie is a town in Green Lake County, Wisconsin, United States. The population was 352 at the 2020 census.

== History ==
First moving to neighboring Princeton in 1845, a man named John Shaw filed a plat for the town in 1851. The town took its name from a local Marian church.

== Geography ==
According to the United States Census Bureau, the town has a total area of 33.5 square miles (86.8 km^{2}), of which 33.5 square miles (86.8 km^{2}) is land and 0.04 square mile (0.1 km^{2}) (0.06%) is water.

== Demographics ==
As of the census of 2000, there were 341 people, 135 households, and 98 families residing in the town. The population density was 10.2 people per square mile (3.9/km^{2}). There were 170 housing units at an average density of 5.1 per square mile (2.0/km^{2}). The racial makeup of the town was 99.12% White, 0.29% African American, and 0.59% from two or more races.

There were 135 households, out of which 30.4% had children under the age of 18 living with them, 65.9% were married couples living together, 4.4% had a female householder with no husband present, and 27.4% were non-families. 26.7% of all households were made up of individuals, and 11.9% had someone living alone who was 65 years of age or older. The average household size was 2.53 and the average family size was 3.02.

In the town, the population was spread out, with 24.3% under the age of 18, 5.3% from 18 to 24, 24.0% from 25 to 44, 32.0% from 45 to 64, and 14.4% who were 65 years of age or older. The median age was 43 years. For every 100 females, there were 107.9 males. For every 100 females age 18 and over, there were 111.5 males.

The median income for a household in the town was $40,417, and the median income for a family was $46,250. Males had a median income of $30,179 versus $20,682 for females. The per capita income for the town was $17,998. About 2.0% of families and 2.0% of the population were below the poverty line, including none of those under age 18 and 9.3% of those age 65 or over.

== Education ==
The vast majority of St. Marie town is served by Princeton School District, while sections lie within Green Lake School District and Berlin Area School District.
