= Thomas D. Bare =

American politician and newspaper editor

THomas D. Bare (May 19, 1867 – December 16, 1931) was an American politician and newspaper editor.

Bare was born in Plainview, Illinois. He moved with his parents to Kampsville, Illinois. Bare eventually settled in Hardin, Illinois where he went to the public schools. Bare owned the Calhoun News and the Calhoun Leader newspapers. Bare was a Republican and served as postmaster of Hardin. Bare served in the Illinois Senate from 1905 to 1909. In 1913, Bare moved with his family to Los Angeles, California where he worked for the Hearst Paper. He died suddenly at his home in Los Angeles.
