= Ron DeGregorio =

Ron DeGregorio is an American ice hockey executive. He was the president of USA Hockey from 2003 to 2015, when he was elected the organization's fourth president since 1937 in 2003. He was awarded the Lester Patrick Trophy the same year.

== Career ==
DeGregorio has been involved with ice hockey for more than 40 years. DeGregorio was first appointed to a USA Hockey post in 1973, when he was named the registrar for the New England District. He was elected to the USA Hockey board of directors in 1975, and later became the vice president of youth hockey. He was the treasurer in the 1980s. In 1995, DeGregorio was elected vice president and chairman of the USA Hockey International Council. He held those positions until 2003, when he was elected president. He has also represented the U.S. at numerous international events, including the Winter Olympics. As president, DeGregorio has been responsible for numerous ceremonial functions; for example, DeGregorio honoured Mike Modano during an on-ice presentation as the top US-born scorer in the National Hockey League. For his efforts to build ice hockey in the United States, he was award the Lester Patrick Trophy in 2003.

DeGregorio is the originator of "Mini One-On-One", an ice hockey competition for youth. It has been broadcast on the Boston Bruins' television network. Outside of ice hockey, DeGregorio is the president of the PenFacs Group, a firm that specializes in investment and insurance.

DeGregorio is included as a featured person in the 2010 publication “American Ice Hockey Administrators” (ISBN 1158330243)

== Personal life ==
DeGregorio currently resides in Salem, New Hampshire with his wife Susan. He was once one of the three owners of the Kentucky Thoroughblades of the American Hockey League.
