= USA Hockey =

National organization, founded 1937

- Association name: USA Hockey
- Founded: October 29, 1937; 88 years ago
- IIHF membership: March 22, 1947
- President: Mike Trimboli
- IIHF men's ranking: 3
- IIHF women's ranking: 1

USA Hockey is a national ice hockey organization in the United States. It is recognized by the International Olympic Committee and the United States Olympic & Paralympic Committee as the governing body for organized ice hockey in the United States and is a member of the International Ice Hockey Federation. Before June 1991, the organization was known as the Amateur Hockey Association of the United States (AHAUS).

The organization is based in Colorado Springs, Colorado. Its mission is to promote the growth of ice hockey in the U.S. USA Hockey programs support and develop players, coaches, officials, and facilities. USA Hockey also has junior ice hockey and senior ice hockey programs, and supports a disabled ice hockey program. USA Hockey provides certification programs for coaches and officials. Members of the organization receive a subscription to USA Hockey Magazine.

== History ==
The Amateur Hockey Association of the United States (AHAUS) was founded on October 29, 1937, in New York City by Tommy Lockhart. When he first started operating AHAUS, the paperwork fit into a shoebox in his apartment. The need for a national governing body for hockey came from the desire to efficiently manage the growing game of ice hockey, rather than having several different groups which included the Amateur Athletic Union.

In September 1938, Lockhart reached signed an agreement with W. G. Hardy of the Canadian Amateur Hockey Association (CAHA) which regulated international games in North America, set out provisions for transfer of players between the organizations, and recognized of each other's authority. In 1940, he led AHAUS into a union with the CAHA by establishing the International Ice Hockey Association, and served as its vice-president. AHAUS was admitted as a member of the Ligue Internationale de Hockey sur Glace in 1947, being recognized as the international governing body of hockey in the United States instead of the Amateur Athletic Union which was previously recognized by the IIHF.

Lockhart established the first national ice hockey tournaments for pre-high school boys in 1949. He announced the establishment of the United States Hockey Hall of Fame on May 19, 1968, to be located in the town of Eveleth, Minnesota. Lockhart was succeeded as president by William Thayer Tutt in 1972.

=== Executive personnel ===
Presidents

- Tommy Lockhart (1937–1972)
- William Thayer Tutt (1972–1986)
- Walter Bush (1986–2003)
- Ron DeGregorio (2003–2015)
- Jim Smith (2015–2021)
- Mike Trimboli (2021–present)

Executive directors

- Hal Trumble (1972–1987)
- Bob Johnson (1987–1990)
- Baaron Pittenger (1990–1993)
- Dave Ogrean (1993–1999)
- Doug Palazzari (1999–2005)
- Dave Ogrean (2005–2017)
- Pat Kelleher (2017–present)

Director of hockey operations

- Jim Johannson (2000–2018)

Coaching directors

- Ken Johannson (1970–1978)
- Lou Vairo (1978–1984)
- Dave Peterson (c. 1980s–1997)

Chief medical officers

- George Nagobads (1984 to 1992)
- Michael Stuart (c. 2000s)

== Structure ==
=== Playing levels ===
Until 2016, USA Hockey used division names such as Mite, Squirt, and Peewee in their youth levels and to indicate the age level of the players. Starting with the 2016–17 season, USA Hockey started using divisions labeled with the oldest age in the group.

=== Districts ===
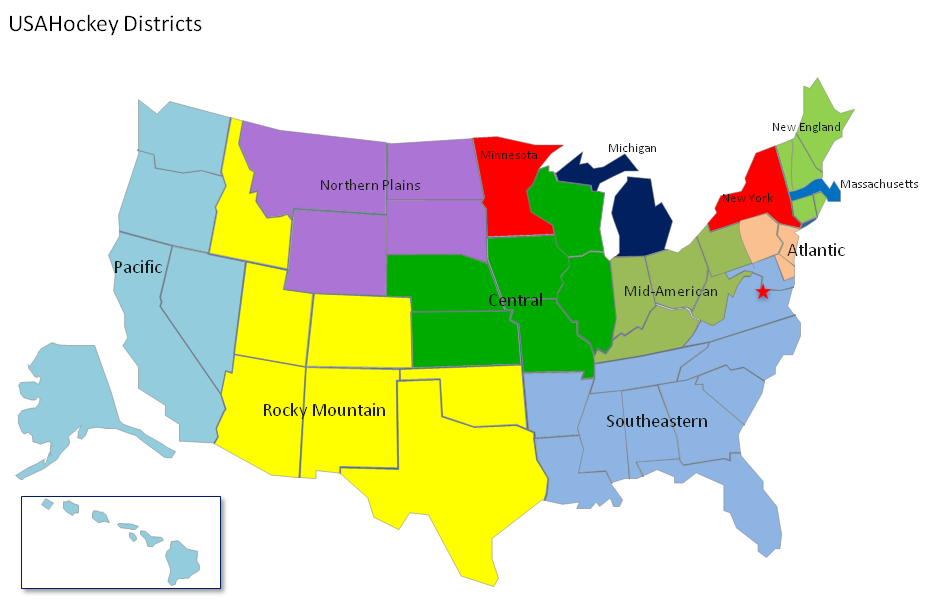
Map of USA Hockey districts

USA Hockey has divided its control into geographical youth districts as follows:

Atlantic

- Eastern Pennsylvania, New Jersey, Delaware

Central

- Illinois, Wisconsin, Missouri, Iowa, Kansas, Nebraska

Massachusetts
Michigan
Mid-American

- Ohio, Indiana, Western Pennsylvania, West Virginia, Kentucky

Minnesota
New England

- Connecticut, Vermont, Rhode Island, Maine, New Hampshire

New York
Northern Plains

- Montana, North Dakota, South Dakota, Wyoming

Pacific

- California, Hawaii, Nevada, Alaska, Oregon, Washington

Rocky Mountain

- Arizona, Colorado, Idaho, Texas, Oklahoma, Utah, New Mexico

Southeastern

- Florida, Alabama, Arkansas, Georgia, Louisiana, Mississippi, Tennessee, North Carolina, South Carolina, Virginia, Maryland

== National teams ==
- Men's national team
- Men's U20 national team
- Men's U18 national team
- Women's national team
- Women's U18 national team
- National inline hockey team
- National sledge hockey team

=== National Team Development Program ===
USA Hockey also operates the National Team Development Program (NTDP), based in Plymouth, Michigan. The program's goal is to prepare student-athletes under the age of 18 for participation on U.S. national teams and continued success throughout their future hockey careers. The NTDP consists of two teams; the U.S. National Under-18 Team, and the U.S. National Under-17 Team. The teams compete in the United States Hockey League in addition to playing NCAA colleges and in International competition. Until 2009, the NTDP competed in the North American Hockey League. Numerous NTDP alumni have gone on to play in the NHL. In the 2012–13 season, 60 former NTDP players suited up for NHL teams. In the 2006 NHL entry draft, six first-round selections (including no. 1 pick Erik Johnson) were former members of the NTDP. In 2007, four NTDP members were selected in the first round, with Patrick Kane and James van Riemsdyk going 1st and 2nd overall respectively. Through 2013, some 228 NTDP players had been selected in the NHL Entry Draft. The NTDP plays home games at USA Hockey Arena.

=== International participation by year ===
2017

Event	Division	Host nation	Date	Result
Men	Top	Germany / France	May 5–21, 2017	Lost quarterfinals (5th overall)
Men U20	Top	Canada	December 26, 2016 – January 5, 2017	Champions (1st overall)
Men U18	Top	Slovakia	April 13–23, 2017	Champions (1st overall)
Women	Top	United States	March 31 – April 7, 2017	Champions (1st overall)
Women U18	Top	Czech Republic	January 7–14, 2017	Champions (1st overall)
Inline	Top	Slovakia	June 24 – July 2, 2017	Champions (1st overall)

2018

Event	Division	Host nation	Date	Result
Men	Top	Denmark	May 4–20, 2018	Bronze medalists (3rd overall)
Men U20	Top	United States	December 26, 2017 – January 5, 2018	Bronze medalists (3rd overall)
Men U18	Top	Russia	April 19–29, 2018	Runners-up (2nd overall)
Women U18	Top	Russia	January 6–13, 2018	Champions (1st overall)
Winter Olympics and Paralympics
Men		South Korea	February 14–25, 2018	Lost quarterfinals (7th overall)
Women		South Korea	February 10–22, 2018	Gold medalists (1st overall)
Sled hockey		South Korea	March 10–18, 2018	Gold medalists (1st overall)

2019

Event	Division	Host nation	Date	Result
Men	Top	Slovakia	May 10–26, 2019	Lost quarterfinals (7th overall)
Men U20	Top	Canada	December 26, 2018 – January 5, 2019	Runners-up (2nd overall)
Men U18	Top	Sweden	April 18–28, 2019	Bronze medalists (3rd overall)
Women	Top	Finland	April 4–14, 2019	Champions (1st overall)
Women U18	Top	Japan	January 6–13, 2019	Runners-up (2nd overall)

2020

Event	Division	Host nation	Date	Result
Men	Top	Switzerland	May 8–24, 2020; Cancelled	–
Men U20	Top	Czech Republic	December 26, 2019 – January 5, 2020	Lost quarterfinals (6th overall)
Men U18	Top	United States	April 16–26, 2020; Cancelled	–
Women	Top	Canada	March 31 – April 10, 2020; Cancelled	–
Women U18	Top	Slovakia	December 26, 2019 – January 2, 2020	Champions (1st overall)

2021

Event	Division	Host nation	Date	Result
Men	Top	Latvia	May 21 – June 6, 2021	Bronze medalists (3rd overall)
Men U20	Top	Canada	December 25, 2020 – January 5, 2021	Champions (1st overall)
Men U18	Top	United States	April 26 – May 6, 2021	Lost quarterfinals (5th overall)
Women	Top	Canada	August 20–31, 2021	Runners-up (2nd overall)
Women U18	Top	Sweden	January 5–12, 2021; Cancelled	–

2022

Event	Division	Host nation	Date	Result
Men	Top	Finland	May 13–29, 2022	Lost bronze medal game (4th overall)
Men U20	Top	Canada	August 9–20, 2022	Lost quarterfinals (5th overall)
Men U18	Top	Germany	April 23 – May 1, 2022	Runners-up (2nd overall)
Women	Top	Denmark	August 25 – September 4, 2022	Runners-up (2nd overall)
Women U18	Top	United States	June 6–13, 2022	Runner-up (2nd overall)
Winter Olympics and Paralympics
Men		China	February 9–20, 2022	Lost quarterfinals (5th overall)
Women		China	February 3–17, 2022	Silver medalists (2nd overall)
Sled hockey		China	March 5–13, 2022	Gold medalists (1st overall)

2023

Event	Division	Host nation	Date	Result
Men	Top	Finland / Latvia	May 12–28, 2023	Lost bronze medal game (4th overall)
Men U20	Top	Canada	December 26, 2022 – January 5, 2023	Bronze medalists (3rd overall)
Men U18	Top	Switzerland	April 20–30, 2023	Champions (1st overall)
Women	Top	Canada	April 5–16, 2023	Champions (1st overall)
Women U18	Top	Sweden	January 8–15, 2023	Bronze medalists (3rd overall)

2024

Event	Division	Host nation	Date	Result
Men	Top	Czechia	May 10–26, 2024	Lost quarterfinals (5th overall)
Men U20	Top	Sweden	December 26, 2023 – January 5, 2024	Champions (1st overall)
Men U18	Top	Finland	April 25 – May 5, 2024	Runner-up (2nd overall)
Women	Top	United States	April 3–14, 2024	Runner-up (2nd overall)
Women U18	Top	Switzerland	January 6–14, 2024	Champions (1st overall)

2025

Event	Division	Host nation	Date	Result
Men	Top	Sweden / Denmark	May 9–25, 2025	Champions (1st overall)
Men U20	Top	Canada	December 26, 2024 – January 5, 2025	Champions (1st overall)
Men U18	Top	United States	April 23 – May 3, 2025	Bronze medalists (3rd overall)
Women	Top	Czechia	April 9–20, 2025	Champions (1st overall)
Women U18	Top	Finland	January 4–12, 2025	Runner-up (2nd overall)

== Chipotle-USA Hockey Nationals ==
USA Hockey has conducted the country’s ice hockey national championship tournaments since 1938, with teams from all across the United States crowned champions across various classifications. The 2022 Chipotle-USA Hockey National Championships crowned champions at 25 different classifications, across nine different host sites across the country. Champions represented 17 different states.
