= Plat =

Map showing divisions of a piece of land in the US

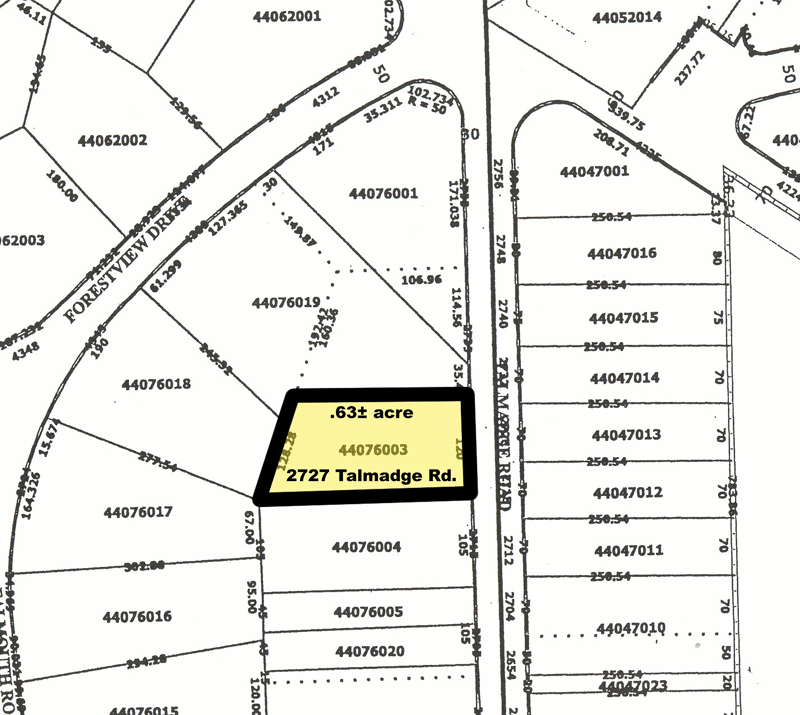
A plat map that shows the location of a lot for sale

In the United States, a plat (/plæt/ or /plɑːt/) is a cadastral map, drawn to scale, showing the divisions of a piece of land. United States General Land Office surveyors drafted township plats of Public Lands Surveys to show the distance and bearing between section corners, sometimes including topographic or vegetation information. City, town or village plats show subdivisions broken into blocks with streets and alleys. Further refinement often splits blocks into individual lots, usually for the purpose of selling the described lots; this has become known as subdivision.

After the filing of a plat, legal descriptions can refer to block and lot-numbers rather than portions of sections. In order for plats to become legally valid, a local governing body, such as a public works department, urban planning commission, zoning board, or another organ of the state must normally review and approve them.

== History ==
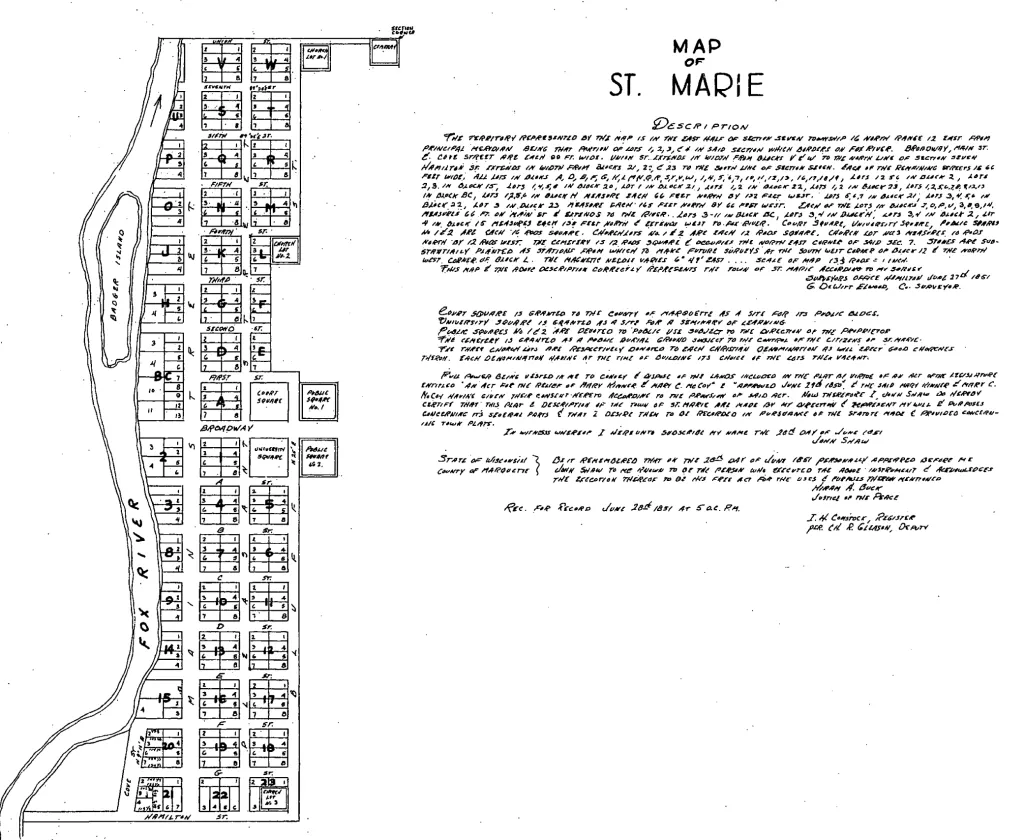
Plat of St. Marie, Wisconsin, filed by John Shaw on June 27, 1851

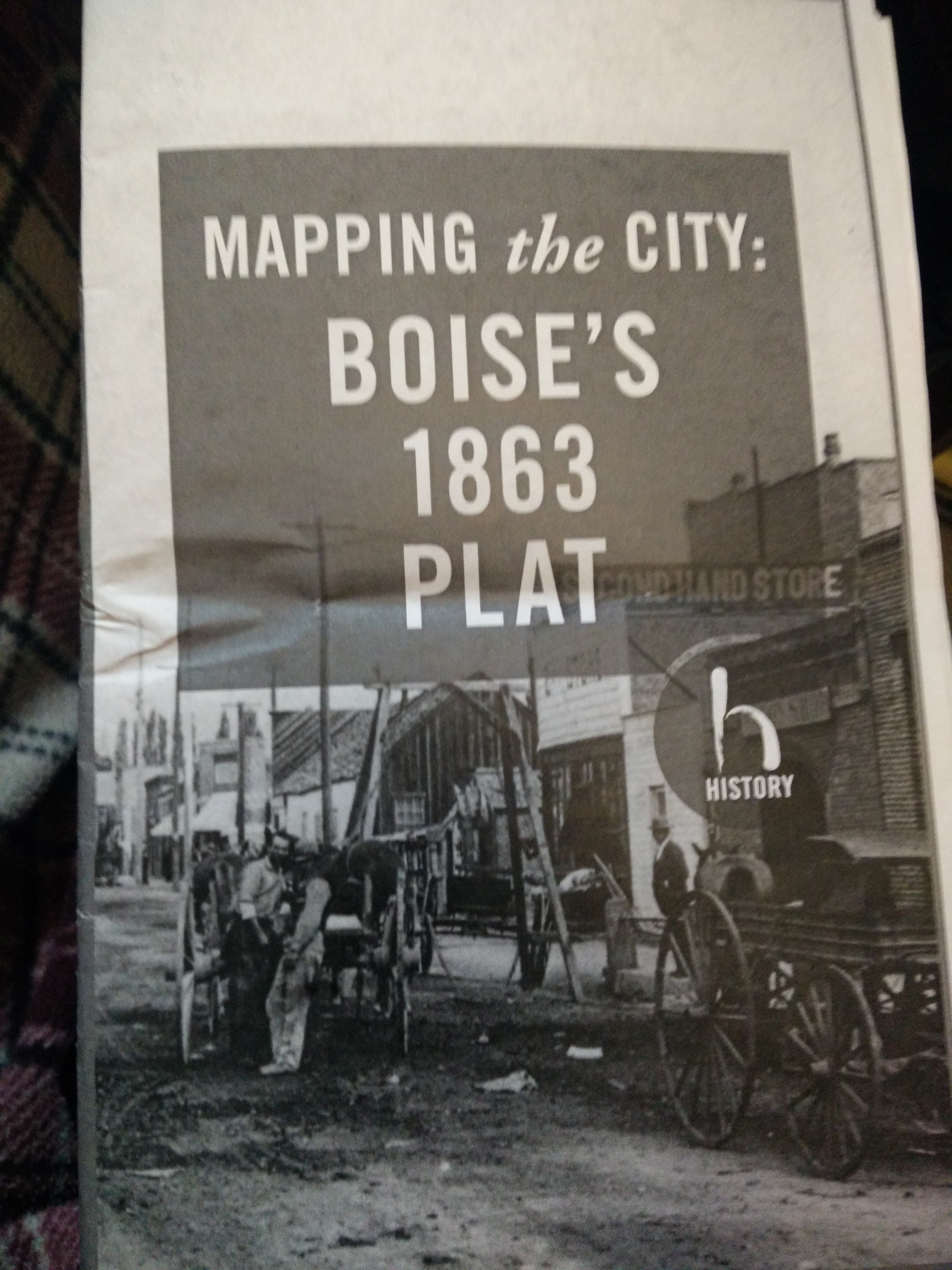
A pamphlet for a walking tour of Boise's original ten blocks

The creation of a plat map marks an important step in the process of incorporating a town or city according to United States law. Because the process of incorporation sometimes occurred at a courthouse, the incorporation papers for many American cities may be stored hundreds of miles away in another state. For example, to view the original United States General Land Office plat for the city of San Francisco, California, filed in 1849, one must visit the Museum of the Oregon Territory in Oregon City, Oregon, as at that time Oregon City was the site of the closest federal land office to San Francisco.

== Types ==
A plat of consolidation or plan of consolidation originates when a landowner takes over several adjacent parcels of land and consolidates them into a single parcel. In order to do this, the landowner will usually need to make a survey of the parcels and submit the survey to the governing body that would have to approve the consolidation.

A plat of subdivision or plan of subdivision appears when a landowner or municipality divides land into smaller parcels. If a landowner owns an acre of land, for instance, and wants to divide it into three pieces, a surveyor would have to take precise measurements of the land and submit the survey to the governing body, which would then have to approve it. A plat of subdivision also applies when a landowner/building owner divides a multi-family building into multiple units. This can apply for the intention of selling off the individual units as condominiums to individual owners.

A correction plat or amending plat records minor corrections to an existing plat, such as correcting a surveying mistake or a scrivener's error. Such plats can sometimes serve to relocate lot-lines or other features, but laws usually tightly restrict such use.

A vacating plat functions to legally void a prior plat or portion of a plat. The rules normally allow such plats only when all the platted lots remain unsold and no construction of buildings or public improvements has taken place.

Other names associated with parcel maps are: land maps, tax maps, real estate maps, landowner maps, lot and block survey system and land survey maps. Parcel maps, unlike any other public real estate record, have no federal, state or municipal oversight with their development.

== Reasons ==
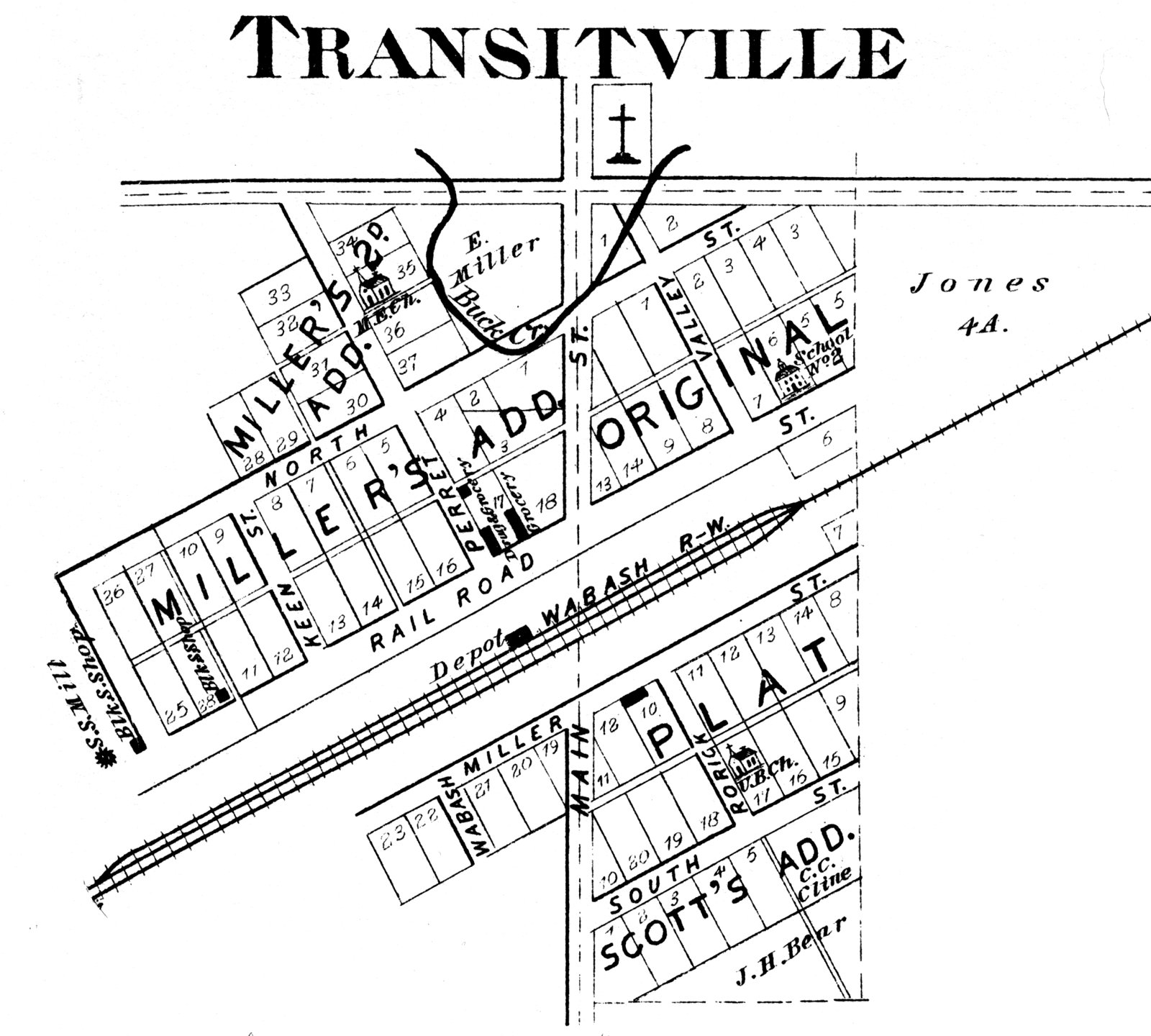
An 1878 plat map of Transitville (now Buck Creek, Indiana)

- Subdivision of a property into multiple smaller lots, as described above.
- Designation of roads or other rights of way.
- Ensuring that all property has access to a public right of way. Without such access, a property owner may be unable to use their property without having to trespass to reach it. The platting process restricts the fraudulent practice of knowingly selling lots with no access to public right of way without revealing that such access does not exist. (Property that does not have access to public right of way may be sold, provided that the buyer is aware of the lack of a public means of access by water or land.)
- Creation or vacation of easements.
- Dedication of land for other public uses, such as parks or areas needed for flood protection.
- Ensuring compliance with zoning. Zoning regulations frequently contain restrictions that govern lot sizes and lot geometry. The platting process allows the governing authorities to ensure that all lots comply with these regulations.
- Ensuring compliance with a land use plan established to control the development of a city.
- Ensuring that all property has access to public utilities.

== Reading ==
Plats contain a number of informational elements:

- The property boundaries are indicated by bearing and distance. The bearing is in the format of degrees, minutes, seconds with compass point letters before and afterward to indicate the compass quadrant. For example, N 38 00 00 E is 38 degrees into the northeast quadrant or 38 degrees east of north. Similarly, S 22 00 00 W is 22 degrees west of south. North here is true north, so magnetic orientation must be corrected for magnetic declination.
- The certification note provides information on the surveyor and is the location where recent US plats place the flood survey code in accordance with the National Flood Insurance Act of 1968.
- The north arrow is familiar to most map readers
- The title block and lot numbers provide information specific to a development or land use plan
- An easement is usually indicated by a dashed line, although it is also common to have to look them up in supplementary documents (such as a title report)
- Streets are usually indicated by a graphical outline of the right of way; the outline also sometimes depicts the paved area.

== See also ==
- Site plan
- Lot and block survey system
- Plat of Zion
