= Princeton Downtown Historic District =

Historic district in Wisconsin, United States

- U.S. National Register of Historic Places
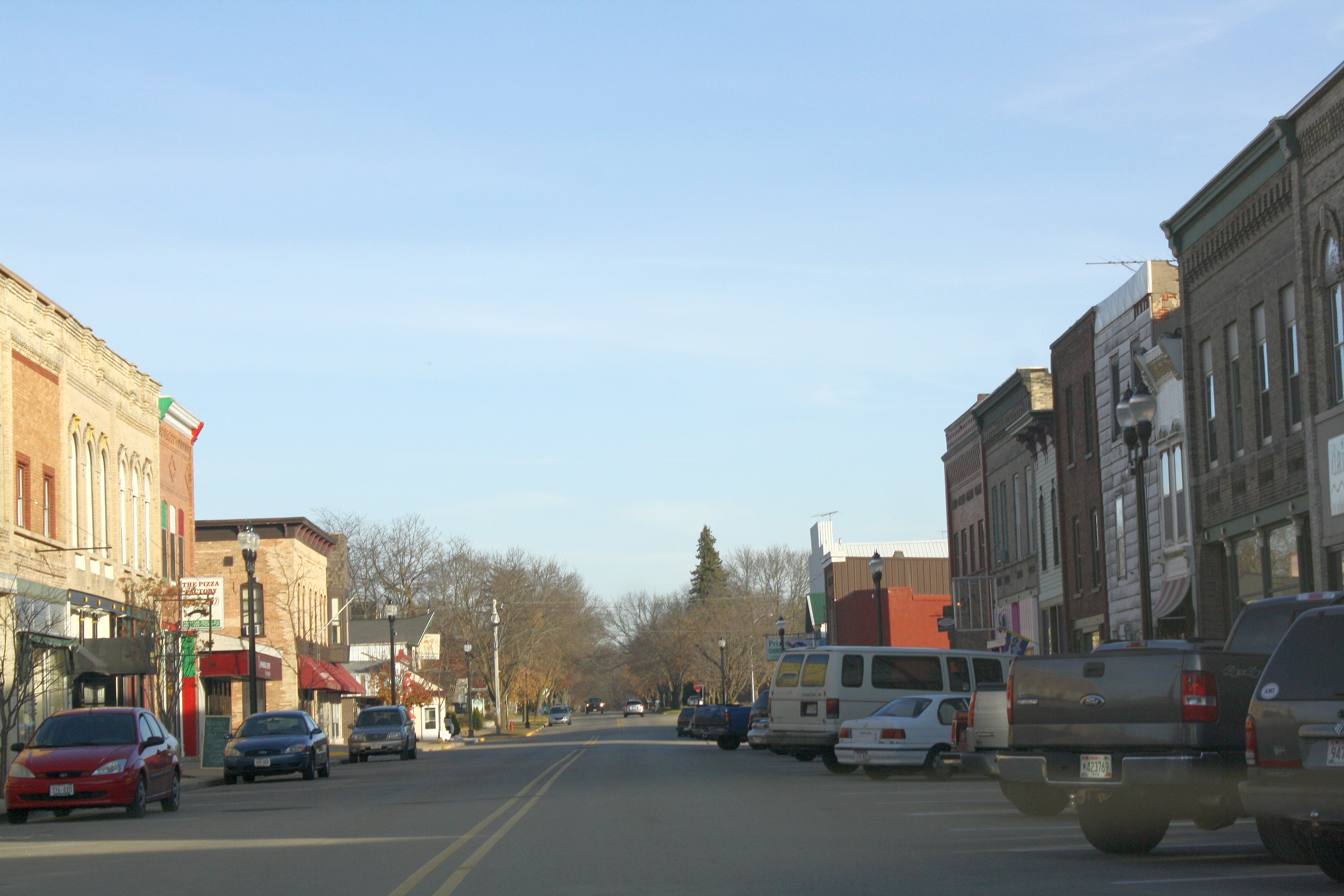
- A portion of the district.
- Location: Approximately .33 miles E from Jct. WI 23 and WI 73, Princeton, Wisconsin
- Coordinates: 43°51′00″N 89°07′52″W
- Area: 4.5 acres (1.8 ha)
- NRHP reference No.: 97000271
- Added to NRHP: March 21, 1997

The Princeton Downtown Historic District is located in Princeton, Wisconsin.

== Description ==
The district of made up of Princeton's old business district, including the 1859 Italianate Teske dry goods store, the 1860/1884 Worm saloon, the pre-1885 frame Italianate Henning meat market, the 1882 Italianate Schall building, the 1890 Italianate Luedtke store, the 1891 Rimpler dry goods store, the 1894 Richardsonian Romanesque Princeton State Bank, the 1901 Schade saloon and jewelry store, and the 1901 Commercial Vernacular Yahr building, which initially showcased furniture and caskets. It was added to the National Register of Historic Places in 1997 and to the State Register of Historic Places the following year.
