= Gilead, Illinois =

- Unincorporated community
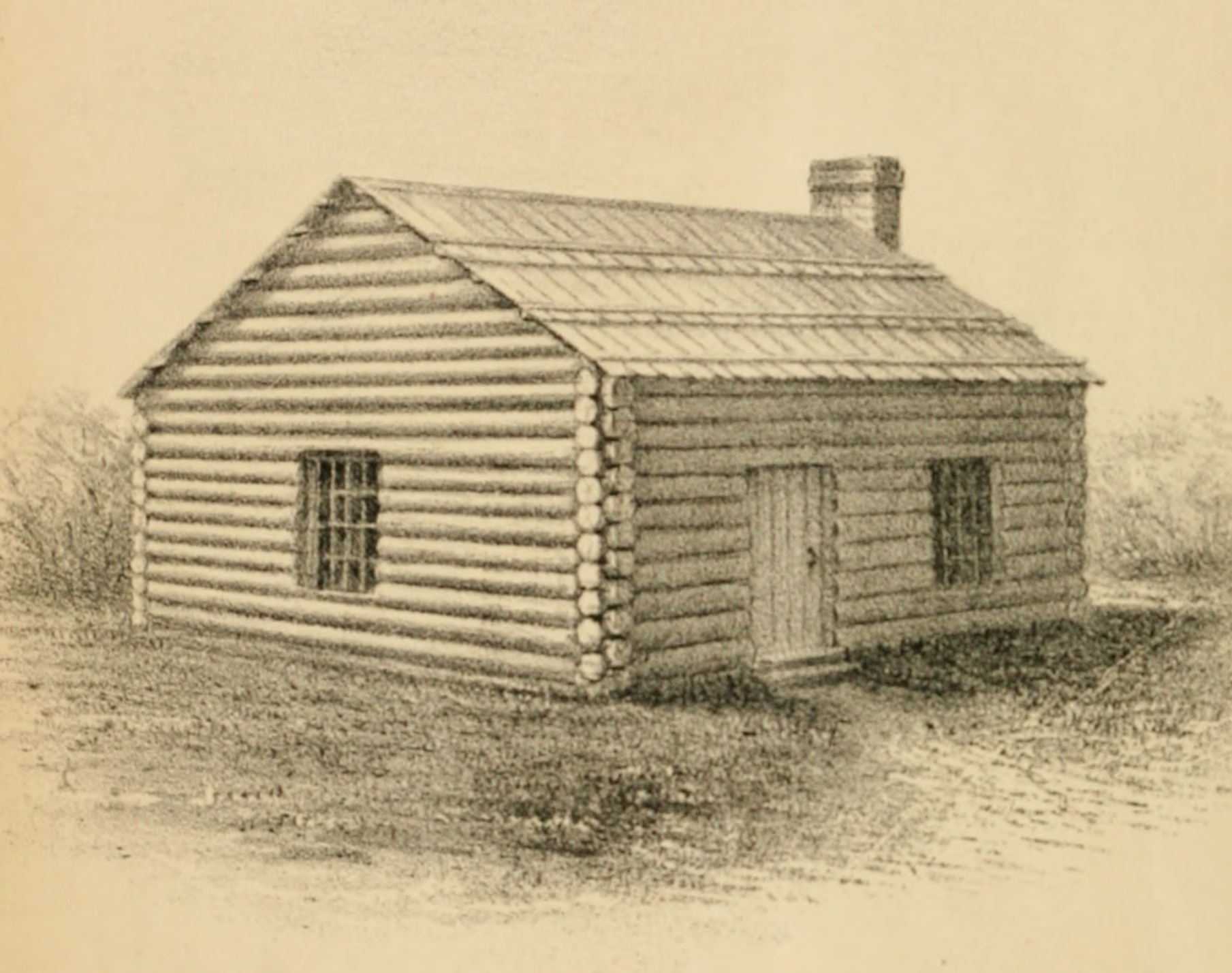
- Original Pike County Courthouse, built 1821

- Location within Illinois Location within the United States
- Coordinates: 39°07′27″N 90°40′02″W
- Country: United States
- State: Illinois
- County: Calhoun
- Elevation: 469 ft (143 m)
- Time zone: UTC-6 (Central (CST))
  - Summer (DST): UTC-5 (CDT)
- Area code: 618
- GNIS feature ID: 409003

Gilead is an unincorporated community in Calhoun County, Illinois, United States. Gilead is located near the Mississippi River 8 miles (13 km) south of Hamburg. It was the county seat of Pike County until the southern end of the county broke up into Calhoun County. Gilead was also Calhoun County's county seat until 1847 when the county court house burnt down.
