= Hamburg, Illinois =

- Village
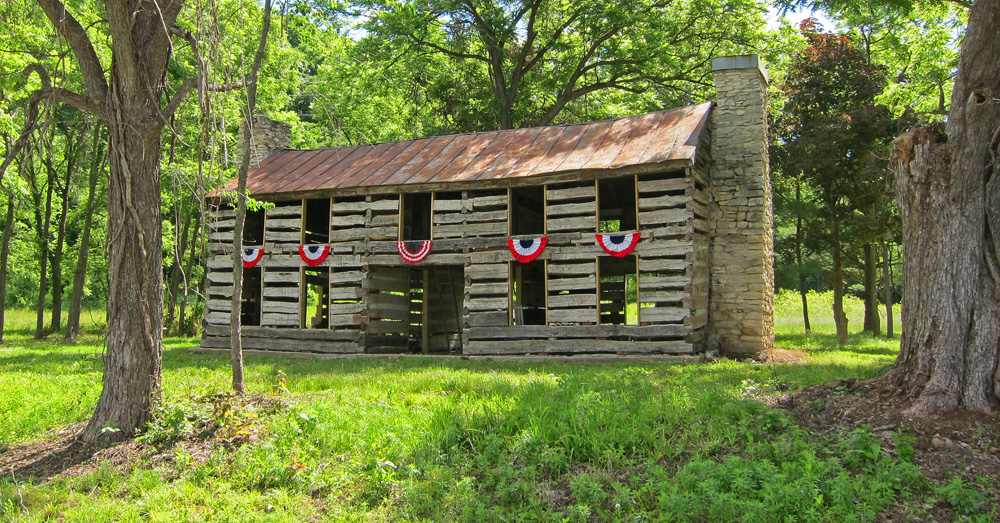
- John Shaw Cabin

- Seal

- Location of Hamburg in Calhoun County, Illinois.
- Coordinates: 39°13′58″N 90°42′55″W
- Country: United States
- State: Illinois
- County: Calhoun
- Precinct: Hamburg

Area
  - Total: 0.656 sq mi (1.70 km^{2})
  - Land: 0.522 sq mi (1.35 km^{2})
  - Water: 0.134 sq mi (0.35 km^{2})
- Elevation: 561 ft (171 m)

Population (2020)
  - Total: 99
  - Density: 190/sq mi (73/km^{2})
- Time zone: UTC-6 (CST)
  - Summer (DST): UTC-5 (CDT)
- ZIP code: 62045
- Area codes: 618/730
- FIPS code: 17-32395
- GNIS feature ID: 2398227
- Website: www.hamburgillinois.com

Hamburg is a village in Hamburg Precinct, Calhoun County, Illinois, United States. The population was 99 at the 2020 census, down from 128 at the 2010 census.

== History ==
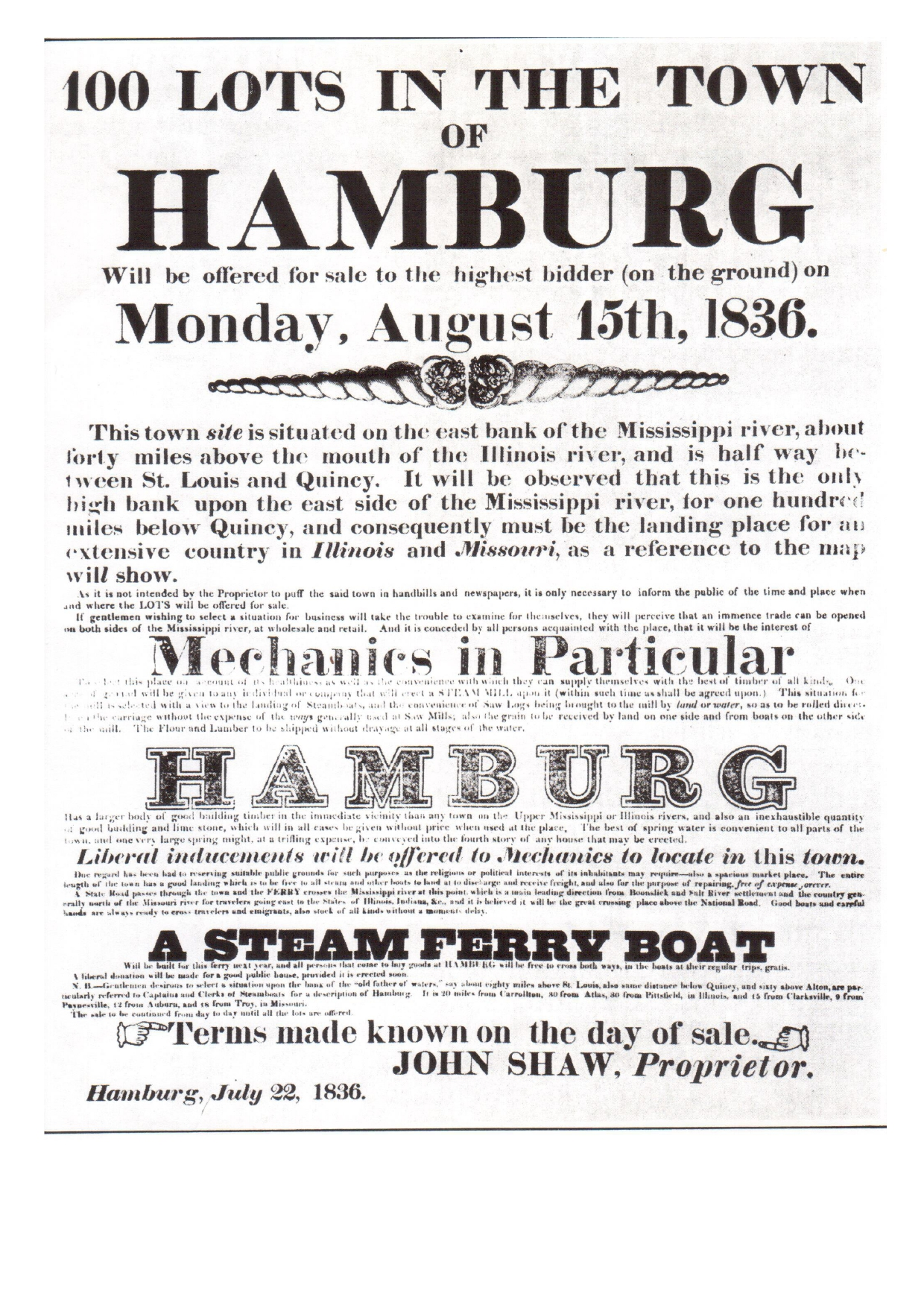
Original 1836 advertisement for 100 lots in Hamburg.

One hundred lots in the town of Hamburg were offered for sale by John Shaw in 1836. Once a thriving river community where apples were loaded and shipped, banks were busy and profitable, stores were laden with goods and shoppers, Hamburg now sits along and sometimes in the waters of the Mississippi. The only public facility is the Hamburg Post Office.

A bluff monument overlooks the village, indicating the burial of riverboat Captain Swarnes who wished to be buried upright to command a panoramic view of the river. National Geographic, September 1975; pages 308 and 309, published a picture of the Delta Queen heading up the Mississippi river past Hamburg, using Captain Swarnes' monument as the photographer's vantage point.

== Geography ==
According to the 2021 census gazetteer files, Hamburg has a total area of 0.66 square miles (1.71 km^{2}), of which 0.52 square miles (1.35 km^{2}) (or 79.57%) is land and 0.13 square miles (0.34 km^{2}) (or 20.43%) is water.

== Demographics ==
Historical population
Census	Pop.	Note	%±
1880	95		—
1900	308		—
1910	335		8.8%
1920	352		5.1%
1930	288		−18.2%
1940	300		4.2%
1950	225		−25.0%
1960	264		17.3%
1970	162		−38.6%
1980	166		2.5%
1990	150		−9.6%
2000	126		−16.0%
2010	128		1.6%
2020	99		−22.7%
U.S. Decennial Census

As of the 2020 census there were 99 people, 42 households, and 35 families residing in the village. The population density was 150.91 inhabitants per square mile (58.27/km^{2}). There were 74 housing units at an average density of 112.80 per square mile (43.55/km^{2}). The racial makeup of the village was 79.80% White, 2.02% African American, 0.00% Native American, 1.01% Asian, 2.02% from other races, and 15.15% from two or more races. Hispanic or Latino of any race were 5.05% of the population.

There were 42 households, out of which 35.7% had children under the age of 18 living with them, 71.43% were married couples living together, 11.90% had a female householder with no husband present, and 16.67% were non-families. 9.52% of all households were made up of individuals, and 9.52% had someone living alone who was 65 years of age or older. The average household size was 4.09 and the average family size was 3.64.

The village's age distribution consisted of 25.5% under the age of 18, 0.0% from 18 to 24, 15.1% from 25 to 44, 32.7% from 45 to 64, and 26.8% who were 65 years of age or older. The median age was 57.2 years. For every 100 females, there were 168.4 males. For every 100 females age 18 and over, there were 123.5 males.

The median income for a household in the village was $38,571, and the median income for a family was $38,036. Males had a median income of $20,625 versus $23,472 for females. The per capita income for the village was $13,999. About 8.6% of families and 15.0% of the population were below the poverty line, including 48.7% of those under age 18 and 0.0% of those age 65 or over.

== Education ==
The school district is Calhoun Community Unit School District 40.
